= Noël Coward on stage and screen =

This is a list of works and appearances by the English playwright, actor, singer and songwriter Noël Coward.

== Stage works ==
Title	Description	Written	Premiere
The Last Chapter	One-act comedy	1917 (Note: Co-written with Esmé Wynne under their joint pen name, Esnomel.)	1917 (Note: The title was changed to Ida Collaborates during the run.)
Woman and Whisky	One-act play	1918 (Note: Co-written with Wynne.)	1918
The Rat Trap	Play in four acts	1918 (Note: One of five plays written early in Coward's career but not produced until, after his successes beginning with The Vortex and Hay Fever, producers were willing to stage them.)	1926
I'll Leave It to You	Light comedy in three acts	1919	1920
The Young Idea	Comedy of youth in three acts	1921	1922
Sirocco	Play in three acts	1921	1927 (Note: Revised in 1927.)
The Better Half	Comedy in one act	1921	1922
The Queen Was in the Parlour (Note: Originally called Nadya, then Souvenir.)	Play in three acts	1922	1926
Mild Oats	Play in one act	1922	Unknown (Note: Mander and Mitchenson describe the play as unperformed, but newspaper archives record occasional performances from 1934 onwards. It is unclear if any of these were given by a professional company.)
London Calling!	Revue	1922–23 (Note: Co-written with Ronald Jeans.)	1923
Weatherwise	Comedy in two scenes	1923	1932
Fallen Angels	Comedy in three acts	1923	1925
The Vortex	Play in three acts	1923	1924
Hay Fever	Comedy in three acts	1924	1925
Easy Virtue	Play in three acts	1924	1925
On with the Dance	Revue (Note: Mainly by Coward, with some music by Philip Braham.)	1924–25	1925
Semi-Monde (Note: Originally titled Ritz Bar.)	Play in three acts	1926	1977
This Was a Man	Comedy in three acts	1926	1926
The Marquise	Comedy in three acts	1926	1927
Home Chat	Play in three acts	1927	1927
This Year of Grace (Note: Titled Charles B. Cochran's 1928 Revue at its try-out in Manchester.)	Revue	1927–28	1928
Bitter Sweet (Note: Originally titled Sari Linden.)	Operetta	1928–29	1929
Private Lives	Intimate comedy in three acts	1929	1930
Post-Mortem	Play in eight scenes	1930	1992 (Note: It was first presented in a prisoner of war camp in Germany in 1944 and was given other amateur productions, but its first professional production was in 1992.)
Cavalcade	Play in three parts	1930–31	1931
Words and Music	Revue	1932	1932
Design For Living	Comedy in three acts	1932	1933
Conversation Piece	Romantic comedy with music	1933	1934
Point Valaine	Play in three acts	1934	1934
Tonight at 8.30; Cycle of ten short plays, presented in groups of three:			
We Were Dancing	Comedy in two scenes	1935	1935
The Astonished Heart	Play in six scenes	1935	1935
Red Peppers	Interlude with music	1935	1935
Hands Across the Sea	Light comedy in one scene	1935	1935
Fumed Oak	Unpleasant comedy in two scenes	1935	1935
Shadow Play	Play with music	1935	1935
Family Album	Victorian comedy with music	1935	1935
Star Chamber	Light comedy in one act	1936	1936
Ways and Means	Comedy in three scenes	1936	1936
Still Life	Play in five scenes	1936	1936
Operette	Musical play	1937	1938
Set to Music (Note: A revised edition of Words and Music for Broadway.)	Revue	1938	1939
Present Laughter (Note: Originally titled Sweet Sorrow.)	Play in three acts	1939	1942
This Happy Breed	Play in three acts	1939 (Note: Because of the outbreak of the Second World War, the 1939 production was cancelled; when Coward returned to acting in 1942, the play was finally produced.)	1942
Blithe Spirit	Play in three acts	1941	1941
Sigh No More	Revue	1945	1945
Pacific 1860	Musical romance	1946	1946
Peace In Our Time	Play in two acts	1946	1947
Long Island Sound	Comedy of manners in two acts (Note: Based on Coward's 1939 short story What Mad Pursuit?)	1947	1989
Ace of Clubs	Musical play	1949	1950
South Sea Bubble (Note: Originally titled Island Fling for its world premiere in the US and later titled Home and Colonial.)	Comedy in three acts	1949	1951
Relative Values (Note: Originally titled Moxie.)	Light comedy in three acts	1951	1951
Quadrille	Romantic comedy in three acts	1951–52	1952
After the Ball (Note: Based on Lady Windermere's Fan.)	Musical play (Note: Originally described as an operetta.)	1953	1954
Nude with Violin	Comedy in three acts	1954	1956
Volcano	Play in two acts	1957	2002 (Note: A single "rehearsed reading" was given in June 1989 at The Mill, Sonning. Mark Shenton called a 2012 production in the West End the first "major" production of the play, and Michael Billington wrote that, until the 2012 production, it had been "unproduced".)
Look After Lulu!	Three-act farce adapted from Georges Feydeau	1958	1959
Waiting in the Wings	Play in three acts	1959–60	1960
Sail Away	Musical comedy	1959–60	1961
The Girl Who Came to Supper (Note: Based on The Sleeping Prince.)	Musical comedy	1963	1963
Suite in Three Keys; Trilogy comprising:			
A Song at Twilight	Play in two scenes	1965	1966
Shadows of the Evening	Play in two scenes	1965	1966
Come Into the Garden, Maud	Play in two scenes	1965	1966
Star Quality	Comedy in three acts (Note: Adapted by Coward from his 1951 short story of the same name.)	1967	1985
Cowardy Custard	Revue	Various (Note: This was an anthology of Coward's words and music from the 1920s to the 1960s.)	1972
Oh, Coward!	Revue	Various (Note: A second Coward anthology.)	1972

== Stage appearances ==
London, except where stated otherwise

Year	Role	Venue
1911	Prince Mussel in The Goldfish by Lila Field	Little, Royal Court Theatre, Crystal Palace
	Cannard in The Great Name by Charles Hawtrey	Prince of Wales
	William in Where the Rainbow Ends by Clifford Mills and John Ramsey	Savoy
1912	Mushroom in An Autumn Idyll by Ruby Ginner	Savoy
	The Boy in A Little Fowl Play, by Harold Owen	London Coliseum
	William in Where the Rainbow Ends	Garrick
1913	An Angel in Hannele by Gerhart Hauptmann	Liverpool Playhouse and Gaiety, Manchester
	Tommy in War in the Air by Frank Dupree	London Palladium
	Understudy for Reginald Sheffield as Buster in Never Say Die by W. H. Post	Apollo
	Charity matinee of A Little Fowl Play	London Opera House
	Slightly in Peter Pan, by J. M. Barrie	Duke of York's
1914	Toured as Slightly in Peter Pan	
1915	Slightly in Peter Pan	Duke of York's
	The Slacker in Where the Rainbow Ends	Garrick
1916	Charles Wykeham in Charley's Aunt by Brandon Thomas	tour
	Basil Pyecroft in The Light Blues, by Mark Ambient and Jack Hulbert (and understudy to Hulbert)	Shaftesbury
	Professional dancer with Eileen Denis at the Elysée restaurant	
	Jack Morrison in The Happy Family, by Cecil Aldin and Adrian Ross	Prince of Wales
1917	Leicester Boyd in Wild Heather, by Dorothy Brandon	Gaiety, Manchester
	Ripley Guildford in The Saving Grace, by Haddon Chambers	Garrick
1918	Courtney Bourner in Scandal by Cosmond Harrison	Strand
1919	Ralph in The Knight of the Burning Pestle, by Francis Beaumont (Note: In Coward's day the play was thought to be a collaboration between Beaumont and John Fletcher: Coward, who found the play boring, was uncomplimentary about both playwrights.)	Birmingham Repertory
1920	Bobbie Dermott in his own play, I'll Leave It to You	Gaiety, Manchester and New
	Ralph in The Knight of the Burning Pestle	Kingsway
1921	Clay Collins in Polly with a Past, by George Middleton and Guy Bolton	St James's
1922	Sholto Brent in his own play, The Young Idea	Prince's Theatre, Bristol, and tour
1923	Sholto Brent	Savoy
	Appeared in London Calling! (of which he was co-author)	Duke of York's
1924	Nicky Lancaster in his own play, The Vortex	Everyman Hampstead and Royalty
1925	Nicky Lancaster	Comedy, Little, Henry Miller's, New York
1926	Lewis Dodd in The Constant Nymph, by Margaret Kennedy and Basil Dean	New
1928	Clark Storey in The Second Man, by S. N. Behrman	Playhouse Theatre
	Appeared in his own revue, This Year of Grace	Baltimore, and Selwyn Theatre, New York
1930	Captain Stanhope in Journey's End, by R. C. Sherriff	Victoria. Singapore
	Elyot Chase in his own play Private Lives	Tour and Phoenix.
	Fred in his own sketch Some Other Private Lives (charity matinee)	Hippodrome
1931	Elyot Chase in Private Lives	Times Square Theatre, New York
1933	Leo in his own play, Design for Living	Hanna Cleveland and Ethel Barrymore, New York
1934	Paul, Duc de Chaucigny-Varennes, in his own operetta, Conversation Piece	His Majesty's
1935	Pre-London tour in his own one-act plays, Tonight at 8.30	
1936	Appeared in the ten plays of Tonight at 8.30	Phoenix
	Appeared in the same plays (with the exception of Star Chamber)	National, New York
1942	Charles Condomine in his own play, Blithe Spirit. (Note: For two weeks, to give the regular player of the part, Cecil Parker, a holiday during the long run.)	St James's
	Toured in "Noël Coward's Play Parade" as Charles Condomine and as Garry Essendine and Frank Gibbons in his own plays, Present Laughter and This Happy Breed	
1943	Garry Essendine in Present Laughter and Frank Gibbons in This Happy Breed	Haymarket
1945	Two performances in his own revue, Sigh No More. (Note: The regular player, Cyril Ritchard, was ill.)	Piccadilly
1947	Garry Essendine in revival of Present Laughter	Haymarket
1948	Three performances in Tonight at 8.30 (Hands Across the Sea, Shadow Play and Fumed Oak) during US tour. (Note: Covering while the regular player, Graham Payn, was ill. This was the last time Coward appeared onstage with Gertrude Lawrence.)	
	Appeared as Max Aramont in Joyeux Chagrins, the French translation of his Present Laughter	Théâtre Édouard VII, Paris
1951	Concert, performing his own songs as try-out for London season (below)	Theatre Royal, Brighton
	Solo cabaret season (October)	Café de Paris
1952	Two cabaret performances with Mary Martin in aid of the Actors' Orphanage (January and November)	Café de Paris
	Second solo cabaret season (June)	Café de Paris
1953	King Magnus in The Apple Cart, by Bernard Shaw	Haymarket
	Third London solo cabaret season	Café de Paris
	Appeared in Stars at Midnight, one-off performance in aid of the Actors' Orphanage	Palladium
1954	Introduced Marlene Dietrich's cabaret act	Café de Paris
	Appeared in Night of 100 Stars, in aid of the Actors' Orphanage	Palladium
	Fourth and final London solo cabaret season	Café de Paris
	Appeared at the Royal Variety Performance	Palladium
1955	Solo cabaret season at the Desert Inn, Las Vegas	
1956	Narrated Ogden Nash's verses for Carnival of the Animals	Carnegie Hall, New York
1957	Sebastien in his own Nude with Violin	Tour and Belasco Theatre New York and second tour
1958	Garry Essendine in Present Laughter	Belasco Theatre and tour
	Appeared in Night of 100 Stars, in aid of the Actors' Orphanage	Palladium
	Appeared in gala cabaret in Nice	
1966	Appeared in his own Suite in Three Keys as Sir Hugo Latymer (A Song at Twilight), George Hilgay (Shadows of the Evening) and Verner Conklin (Come Into the Garden, Maud)	Queen's

Source: Mander and Mitchenson.

== Songs ==
Coward wrote more than three hundred songs. The Noël Coward Society's website, drawing on performing statistics from the publishers and the Performing Rights Society, names "Mad About The Boy" (from Words and Music) as Coward's most popular song, followed, in order, by:

- "I'll See You Again" (Bitter Sweet)
- "Mad Dogs and Englishmen" (Words and Music)
- "If Love Were All" (Bitter Sweet)
- "Someday I'll Find You" (Private Lives)
- "I'll Follow My Secret Heart" (Conversation Piece)
- "London Pride" (1941)
- "A Room With a View" (This Year of Grace)
- "Mrs Worthington" (1934)
- "Poor Little Rich Girl" (On with the Dance)
- "The Stately Homes of England" (Operette)

In the society's second tier of favourites are:

- "The Party's Over Now" (Words and Music)
- "Dearest Love" (Operette)
- "Dear Little Café" (Bitter Sweet)
- "Parisian Pierrot" (London Calling!)
- "Men About Town" (Tonight at 8.30)
- "Twentieth Century Blues" (Cavalcade)
- "Uncle Harry" (Pacific 1860)
- "Don't Let's Be Beastly to the Germans" (1943)
- "There Are Bad Times Just Around the Corner" (Globe Review)
- "Dance, Little Lady" (This Year of Grace)
- "Has Anybody Seen Our Ship?" (Tonight at 8.30)
- "I Went to a Marvellous Party" (Set to Music)
- "Nina" (Sigh No More)
- "A Bar on the Piccola Marina" (1954)
- "Why Must the Show Go On?" (Together With Music)
- "Sail Away" (Ace of Clubs and Sail Away)
- "Zigeuner" (Bitter Sweet)

Source: Noël Coward Music Index and Lyrics of Noël Coward.

== Cinema ==
=== Adaptations and original films ===
- The Queen Was in the Parlour, directed by Graham Cutts (UK, 1927, based on the play of the same name)
- Easy Virtue, directed by Alfred Hitchcock (UK, 1928, based on the play of the same name)
- The Vortex, directed by Adrian Brunel (UK, 1928, based on the play of the same name)
- Private Lives, directed by Sidney Franklin, Metro-Goldwyn-Mayer (1931, based on the play of the same name)
- Tonight Is Ours, directed by Stuart Walker, Paramount (1933, based on the play The Queen Was in the Parlour)
- Cavalcade, directed by Frank Lloyd, 20th Century Fox (1933, based on the play of the same name)
- Bitter Sweet, directed by Herbert Wilcox (UK, 1933, based on the operetta of the same name)
- Design for Living, directed by Ernst Lubitsch, Paramount (1933, based on the play of the same name)
- Les amants terribles (The Terrible Lovers), directed by Marc Allégret (France, 1936, based on the play Private Lives)
- Bitter Sweet, directed by W. S. Van Dyke, Metro-Goldwyn-Mayer (1940, based on the operetta of the same name)
- In Which We Serve, original film, directed by Coward and David Lean, British Lion (1942). Screenplay by Coward.
- We Were Dancing, directed by Robert Z. Leonard, Metro-Goldwyn-Mayer (1942, based on the plays We Were Dancing, Ways and Means and Private Lives)
- This Happy Breed, directed by David Lean, Universal (UK, 1944, based on the play of the same name) (Coward was also a producer)
- Blithe Spirit, directed by David Lean (UK, 1945, based on the play of the same name) (Coward was also a producer)
- Brief Encounter, directed by David Lean (UK, 1945, based on the play Still Life) (Coward was also a screenwriter and producer)
- The Astonished Heart, directed by Terence Fisher (UK, 1950, based on the play of the same name) (Coward was also a screenwriter)
- Meet Me Tonight, directed by Anthony Pelissier (UK, 1952, based on the plays Ways and Means, Red Peppers, and Fumed Oak)
- Pretty Polly, directed by Guy Green (UK, 1967, based on the short story Pretty Polly Barlow)
- Brief Encounter, directed by Alan Bridges (UK, 1974, based on the play Still Life)
- Relative Values, directed by Eric Styles (UK, 2000, based on the play of the same name)
- Easy Virtue, directed by Stephan Elliott (UK, 2008, based on the play of the same name)
- Blithe Spirit, directed by Edward Hall (UK, 2020, based on the play of the same name)

Source: Mander and Mitchenson.

=== Actor ===
- Hearts of the World (1918) (uncredited)
- The Scoundrel (1935) as Anthony Mallare
- Men Are Not Gods (1936) (uncredited)
- In Which We Serve (1942) as Captain E.V. Kinross (also a screenwriter, producer and co-director)
- Blithe Spirit (1945) (uncredited narrator) (also producer)
- Brief Encounter (1945) (uncredited narrator) (also a screenwriter and co-producer)
- The Astonished Heart (1950) as Dr. Christian Faber
- Blithe Spirit (1956 TV film) as Charles Condomine
- Around the World in 80 Days (1956) as Roland Hesketh-Baggott
- Our Man in Havana (1959) as Hawthorne
- Surprise Package (1960) as King Pavel II
- Paris When It Sizzles (1964) as Alexander Meyerheim
- Ninety Years On (1964 TV film) as Narrator / Host
- Bunny Lake Is Missing (1965) as Horatio Wilson
- Androcles and the Lion (1967 TV film) as Caesar
- Boom! (1968) as The Witch of Capri
- The Italian Job (1969) as Mr. Bridger

Source: Mander and Mitchenson.

== Awards and nominations ==
Organisations	Year	Category	Nominated work	Result	Ref.
Academy Awards	1942	Honorary Award	In Which We Serve	Nominated	
Academy Awards	1943	Best Original Screenplay	In Which We Serve	Nominated	
New York Drama Critics' Circle	1942	Best Foreign Play	Blithe Spirit	Won	
Primetime Emmy Award	1956	Best Musical Contribution	"Camarata" (from Ford Star Jubilee)	Nominated	
Tony Awards	1964	Best Direction of a Musical	High Spirits	Nominated	
Tony Awards	1964	Best Book of a Musical	The Girl Who Came to Supper	Nominated	
Tony Awards	1970	Special Tony Award	Himself	Honoured	

== Notes, references and sources ==
=== Sources ===
- Castle, Charles (1972). Noël. London: W H Allen. ISBN 978-0-491-00534-0.
- Coward, Noël (1965). The Lyrics of Noël Coward. London: Heinemann. OCLC 1574850.
- Hoare, Philip (1995). Noël Coward, A Biography. London: Sinclair-Stevenson. ISBN 978-1-4081-0675-4.
- Lesley, Cole (1976). The Life of Noël Coward. London: Cape. ISBN 978-0-224-01288-1.
- Mander, Raymond; Joe Mitchenson (2000) [1957]. Barry Day; Sheridan Morley (eds.). Theatrical Companion to Coward (second ed.). London: Oberon. ISBN 978-1-84002-054-0.
- Morley, Sheridan (1974) [1969]. A Talent to Amuse. London: Penguin. ISBN 978-0-14-003863-7.
