= Family Album (play) =

Play by Noël Coward

Coward and Lawrence in Family Album

Family Album, described as "a Victorian comedy with music", is a short comic play in one scene by Noël Coward. It is one of ten short plays that make up Tonight at 8.30, a cycle written to be performed in groups of three plays across three evenings. The original production, starring Coward and Gertrude Lawrence played in a pre-London tour, and then the West End, and finally New York, in 1935–1937. Family Album has been revived periodically and has been adapted for television.

The play depicts a prosperous middle-class Victorian family gathered after the funeral of their father. It emerges that he was a man of bad character, who wanted to deprive his children of their inheritance, but they have the last laugh.

== Background ==
In the late 1920s and early 1930s, Coward wrote a succession of hits, ranging from the operetta Bitter Sweet (1929) and the epic Cavalcade (1931), requiring a large cast, gargantuan sets and a complex hydraulic stage, to the intimate comedies Private Lives (1930), in which Coward starred alongside Gertrude Lawrence, and Design for Living (1932). Coward said that after Private Lives, he felt that the public enjoyed seeing him and Lawrence together on stage, and so he wrote the play cycle Tonight at 8.30 as "acting, singing, and dancing vehicles for Gertrude Lawrence and myself".

In the programme for the London run Coward wrote:

[T]he idea of presenting three short plays in an evening instead of one long one is far from original. In fact, if one looks back over the years, one finds that the "triple bill" formula has been used, with varying degrees of success, since the earliest days of the theatre. Latterly, however – that is during the last quarter of a century – it has fallen from favour. Occasionally still a curtain-raiser appears in the provinces but wearing a sadly hang-dog expression, because it knows only too well, poor thing, that it would not be there at all were the main attraction of the evening long enough.[…]
A short play, having a great advantage over a long one in that it can sustain a mood without technical creaking or overpadding, deserves a better fate, and if by careful writing, acting, and producing I can do a little towards reinstating it in its rightful pride, I shall have achieved one of my more sentimental ambitions.

All the plays in the cycle starred Coward and Gertrude Lawrence. Coward directed the plays and wrote the words and music for songs in four of them. In this play, billed as "a Victorian comedy with music" there are four songs. They are "Drinking Song" ("Here's a toast to each of us"); "Princes and Princesses"; "Music Box", and "Hearts and Flowers".

== First performances ==
Six of the ten plays in Tonight at 8.30 were first presented at the Manchester Opera House beginning in October 1935. They did not include Family Album, which was added later in the pre-London tour and first performed at the Theatre Royal, Birmingham, on 9 December 1935.

Tonight at 8.30 opened in London on 9 January 1936 at the Phoenix Theatre, In the first programme of three plays, Family Album was the first item, followed by The Astonished Heart and Red Peppers. When King George V died eleven days after the opening of the run, a comedy about a funeral was thought inappropriate and Family Album was replaced in the triple bill by We Were Dancing during the following four weeks.

After a try-out in Boston, the Broadway opening took place on 24 November 1936 at the National Theatre, again starring Coward and Lawrence. Family Album was the final item in the third triple bill, which it shared with Ways and Means and Still Life.

== Original cast ==
- Jasper Featherways – Noël Coward
- Jane Featherways – Gertrude Lawrence
- Lavinia Featherways – Everley Gregg (Joyce Carey in New York)
- Richard Featherways – Edward Underdown
- Charles Winter – Anthony Pelissier
- Harriet Winter – Alison Leggatt (Joan Swinstead in New York)
- Edward Valance – Kenneth Carten
- Emily Valance – Moya Nugent
- Burrows, the butler – Alan Webb

== Plot ==
The play is set in autumn 1860 in the drawing room of the Featherways family's house in Kent. The family, all dressed in mourning, have returned from the funeral of the paterfamilias. The group comprises his five children, Jasper, Lavinia, Richard, Harriet and Emily with, except for the unmarried Lavinia and RIchard, their spouses. Warmed by glasses of madeira poured by their much-loved old butler, Burrows, they reminisce. An old toybox is produced, as is an old musical box; old songs are remembered and more glasses of wine are drunk. Suddenly Lavinia, her reticence overcome by wine, denounces the old man: "I hated Papa, so did you … He was cruel to Mama, he was unkind to us, he was profligate and pompous and worse still, he was mean". She then astonishes the others by telling them that the will read to them that morning, leaving the Featherways fortune to the family, was not the old man's final will: a week before he died he made a new one, leaving them nothing but giving large sums to his various mistresses and the rest to pay for a new church containing a grandiose memorial to himself. It was witnessed by Lavinia and Burrows. Minutes after the old man's death they burned it, leaving the old will to be acted upon. Questioned by Jasper, Burrows says his deafness is getting worse and he will never be able to hear questions about the will. They invite him to join them for a glass of madeira, and, to the tune of the musical box, they dance round him, hand in hand.

== Revivals and adaptations ==
Family Album has been revived in complete or part-complete cycles of Tonight at 8.30. In a 1948 American tour, directed by the author, Lawrence appeared again as Jane, with Graham Payn as Jasper. A West End revival in 1970 featured Millicent Martin and Gary Bond as Jane and Jasper. The play was included in productions of Tonight at 8.30, the Williamstown Theatre Festival in 2000, the Chichester Festival in 2006, the Antaeus Company in Los Angeles in 2007, the Shaw Festival in 2009, and the Jermyn Street Theatre, London in 2018.

In May 1991 Family Album was televised by the BBC in a cycle of eight of the Tonight at 8.30 plays, with Joan Collins as Lavinia and Denis Quilley as Jasper.

In January 1936, Coward and Lawrence, together with Everly Gregg, Alison Leggatt, Edward Underdown and Alan Webb from the original cast, recorded "Drinking Song" and "Hearts and Flowers" and excerpts from the dialogue from the play for His Master's Voice, with the Phoenix Theatre Orchestra conducted by Clifford Greenwood.

== Critical reception ==
The Observer said of the first production, "It is sometimes nearly vulgar, sometimes nearly mawkish, and sometimes modernly smart." The Times described the piece as "swerving, in Mr Coward's most uncomfortable manner, from sadness to fooling, from fooling to sentimentality, and from sentimentality to high jinks with the butler." Coward himself called it "a Victorian dainty" and "a sly satire on Victorian hypocrisy, adorned with an unobtrusive but agreeable musical score. It was stylised both in its décor and its performance, was a joy to play and provided the whole talented company with good parts."
