= We Were Dancing =

1935 play by Noël Coward

Gertrude Lawrence and Noël Coward in the original production, 1936

We Were Dancing is a short comic play in two scenes by Noël Coward. It is one of ten short plays that make up Tonight at 8.30, a cycle written to be performed in groups of three plays across three evenings. The original production, starring Coward and Gertrude Lawrence played in a pre-London tour, and then the West End, and finally New York, in 1935–1937. We Were Dancing has been revived periodically and was adapted for the cinema in 1942.

The play depicts a married woman who falls in love with a divorced man at a dance on a South Pacific island. They plan to go to Australia, but in the cold light of morning, they realise that they have nothing in common and go their separate ways,

== Background ==
In the late 1920s and early 1930s, Coward wrote a succession of hits, ranging from the operetta Bitter Sweet (1929) and the epic Cavalcade (1931), requiring a large cast, gargantuan sets and a complex hydraulic stage, to the intimate comedies Private Lives (1930), in which Coward starred alongside Gertrude Lawrence, and Design for Living (1932). Coward said that after Private Lives, he felt that the public enjoyed seeing him and Lawrence together on stage, and so he wrote the play cycle Tonight at 8.30 as "acting, singing, and dancing vehicles for Gertrude Lawrence and myself".

In the programme for the London run Coward wrote:

[T]he idea of presenting three short plays in an evening instead of one long one is far from original. In fact, if one looks back over the years, one finds that the "triple bill" formula has been used, with varying degrees of success, since the earliest days of the theatre. Latterly, however – that is during the last quarter of a century – it has fallen from favour. Occasionally still a curtain-raiser appears in the provinces but wearing a sadly hang-dog expression, because it knows only too well, poor thing, that it would not be there at all were the main attraction of the evening long enough.[…]
A short play, having a great advantage over a long one in that it can sustain a mood without technical creaking or overpadding, deserves a better fate, and if by careful writing, acting, and producing I can do a little towards reinstating it in its rightful pride, I shall have achieved one of my more sentimental ambitions.

We Were Dancing was the first of the Tonight at 8.30 cycle to be presented. All the plays in the cycle starred Coward and Gertrude Lawrence. Coward directed the plays and wrote the words and music for songs in four of them. In this play Lawrence's character sings the song "We Were Dancing" in the first scene.

== First performances ==
Tonight at 8.30 opened at the Opera House, Manchester, on 15 October 1935, the first play on the bill, followed by two others from Tonight at 8.30: The Astonished Heart and Red Peppers. It then opened in London on 9 January 1936 at the Phoenix Theatre, but for the first three weeks of the run only six of the plays were presented. We Were Dancing was added on 29 January, and the other three followed later in the run. As in Manchester, We Were Dancing was followed by The Astonished Heart and Red Peppers.

After a try-out in Boston, the Broadway opening took place on 24 November 1936 at the National Theatre, again starring Coward and Lawrence. We Were Dancing was included in the first of the three programmes in the cycle, along with Fumed Oak and Shadow Play.

== Roles and original cast ==
- Louise Charteris – Gertrude Lawrence
- Hubert Charteris, Louise's husband – Alan Webb
- Karl Sandys – Noël Coward
- Clara Bethel, Hubert's sister – Alison Leggatt (Joyce Carey in New York)
- George Davies – Edward Underdown
- Eva Blake – Moya Nugent
- Major Blake – Anthony Pelissier
- Ippaga – Kenneth Carten

== Plot ==
=== Scene 1: The veranda of the country club on Samolo. Evening ===
At a dance at the club on a British South Pacific island colony, a young man and woman, George Davies and Eva Blake, leave the dance floor and drive off in his car, heading for a deserted beach where they can be alone. As they leave, Louise Charteris and Karl Sandys waltz in, locked in mutual fascination. They kiss, and are discovered by Louise's husband, Hubert, and his sister Clare. Hubert listens civilly to Karl's protestations of love for Louise, and admits to Karl that he himself is no longer madly in love with Louise after 13 years of marriage, although he still cares for her greatly. The exchange is interrupted by the entrance of Major Blake, looking for his wife, Eva. Clara fobs him off by saying that Eva is with mutual friends, the Baileys and he goes out. Hubert remains concerned that Louise is so sure that she wants to be with a man she has only just met. She replies in song – "We were dancing … When the world caught on fire"; emotion overcomes her and she faints in Karl's arms.

=== Scene 2: The veranda. Early morning ===
The four have been talking all night and are exhausted. Karl proposes to take Louise with him on a business trip to Australia, and Hubert, resignedly bidding him make her happy, leaves with Clara. Left alone together Louise and Karl realise that their earlier emotions were transitory and that they are not in love with each other. They dance together, but the spark has died. They part on good terms and she leaves. Eva Blake and George Davies return furtively from their illicit excursion hoping not to have been missed. Karl remembers the Major's enquiries and asks, "Is your name Eva?" When she says yes, he replies sardonically, "I congratulate you."

== Revivals and adaptations ==
We Were Dancing was included in a triple bill of plays from Tonight at 8.30 at the Hampstead Theatre in 1970, together with Red Peppers and Family Album, starring Millicent Martin and Gary Bond. The production transferred to the West End in 1971. The play was given in 2018 at the Jermyn Street Theatre, London, as part of a three-evening cycle of Tonight at 8.30, directed by Tom Littler, with Sara Crowe and Ian Hallard as Louise and Karl.

The piece was presented at the Shaw Festival, Canada, in 1971 and at the Williamstown Theatre Festival in 2000. The Antaeus Company in Los Angeles revived all ten plays in October 2007, as did the Shaw Festival in 2009.

The play, together with ideas from Ways and Means, another play in the Tonight at 8.30 cycle, was loosely adapted as a film of the same name in 1942. It was directed by Robert Z. Leonard and starred Norma Shearer and Melvyn Douglas. The plot was modified to so that the couple were now expatriate impoverished European aristocrats, professional houseguests of, and looking for mates among, nouveau riche Americans who are impressed by their titles.

== Critical reception ==
Coward described the piece as "a light episode, little more than a curtain-raiser" and felt that it fulfilled that function adequately". His friend the actress Lynn Fontanne disagreed, and told him that the audience needed to believe that the two main characters were in love, but that the idea came across as very silly. At the time of the first production The Manchester Guardian described the play as "a witty little piece", but subsequent critical opinion has varied. In 1970 the critic Michael Billington considered it one of the most durable of the Tonight at 8.30 plays; in 2009 Coward's biographer Barry Day wrote that it was generally considered the weakest of the cycle.
