= Philip Tonge =

English actor (1897–1959)

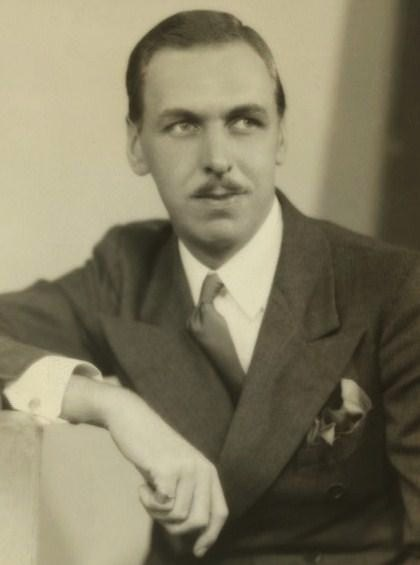
- Philip Tonge (ca. 1930)
- Born: Philip Asheton Tonge; 26 April 1897; Hampstead, London, England, United Kingdom
- Died: 28 January 1959 (aged 61); Hollywood, California, United States
- Occupation: Actor
- Years active: 1902–1959
- Spouse(s): Lyda (m. 19??; his death 1959)

Philip Asheton Tonge (26 April 1897 – 28 January 1959) was an English actor. Born into a theatrical family, he was a child actor, making his stage debut at the age of five. Among the stars with whom he performed while he was a boy were Henry Irving, Herbert Beerbohm Tree, Ellen Terry and Johnston Forbes-Robertson. His colleagues as child actors included Hermione Gingold, Mary Glynne, Esmé Wynne-Tyson and Noël Coward.

Tonge's adult acting career was in the U.S., where he and his parents settled after the First World War. He made numerous appearances in Broadway productions, including nine Coward plays. Among his films were Miracle on 34th Street (1947), Hans Christian Andersen (1952) and Witness for the Prosecution (1957).

== Life and career ==
=== Early years ===
Tonge was born in Hampstead, London, the son of the actor H. Asheton Tonge and his wife Lillian, née Brennard, an actress He made his first appearance on the stage at His Majesty's Theatre in October 1902, as Joseph in Hall Caine's The Eternal City. In December of that year he took the part of Donald in A Little Un-Fairy Princess by Frances Hodgson Burnett, in 1903 he played Ib in Ib and Little Christina at Terry's Theatre and Egil in Ibsen's The Vikings under Ellen Terry's management at the Imperial. Other child roles included Cupid in a revival of Ben Jonson's masque The Hue and Cry After Cupid (1903), Geoffrey in Tennyson's Becket, starring Henry Irving and Eilif in An Enemy of the People starring Herbert Beerbohm Tree (all 1905). In 1906 he had his first Shakespeare roles: Robin in The Merry Wives of Windsor and Mamillius in The Winter's Tale; later in the year he went to Manchester to play Michael in Peter Pan. On tour and in London he played Ptolemy in Shaw's Caesar and Cleopatra, starring Johnston Forbes-Robertson (1907).

Tonge and Noël Coward in Where the Rainbow Ends, 1911

In September 1908 Tonge was cast as Freddy in The Sway Boat at the Kingsway Theatre, London, and in December of the same year he had the important role of Tommy in Tree's Christmas family play, Pinkie and the Fairies. The cast was headed by Ellen Terry, and included Frederick Volpe, Marie Löhr, Viola Tree and the young Hermione Gingold. The following year he was in A Boy's Proposal, a curtain-raiser for Galsworthy's Strife at the Adelphi. The reviewer in The Times called Tonge "a remarkable boy" and commented, "Nothing more natural and more accompllshed than this youngster in an Eton jacket could be imagined, and the piece is well worth seeing for his amusing performance alone." In 1911 Tonge and Mary Glynne had the principal children's roles in a comic opera, The Love Mills at the Globe.

In December 1911 Tonge played Crispian Carey in Where the Rainbow Ends. The adult stars were Reginald Owen as St George of England and Lydia Bilbrook as Crispian's mother. Other children in the cast included Gingold, Esmé Wynne-Tyson and the twelve-year-old Noël Coward. Coward idolised Tonge, with whom he had his first sexual experience.

=== Adult career ===
Tonge made his film debut in 1913 in the short The Still Voice, and in the following year he made his first appearance on Broadway as Tommy Traddles in The Highway of Life, a dramatisation of David Copperfield at Wallack's Theatre. He and his parents moved permanently to the US, and he made his adult stage career in New York and on tour in a wide range of roles.

In 1915 Tonge played Paris in Romeo and Juliet. He gave further Broadway performances as Robert Langworthy in Gamblers All (1917), Murty in The Grasshopper (1917), Roger in The New Word (1917), Peter in Peter's Mother (1918), Willis Ainley in Smilin' Through (1919), Secretary in Bluebeard's Eighth Wife (1921) and Lord Kinlock in The Bunch and Judy (1922), His final Broadway appearances of the 1920s were as Al Lavery in a crime thriller, Interference (1927) and Frank Oakes in a comedy, In Love With Love (1928).

During the 1930s Tonge appeared with Edith Evans in The Lady with a Lamp (1931) after which he was in a comedy, Clear All Wires (1932) and in 1933 was cast by Coward, now an international star, in the small role of Matthew Birbeck in the premiere of Design for Living (1933), starring Coward, Alfred Lunt and Lynn Fontanne, which ran for five months at the Ethel Barrymore Theatre. After two dramas, Eight Bells (1933) and The Lake (1934), Tonge was in another Coward premiere, the melodramatic Point Valaine, which ran for three months in 1935.

Tonge's next three Broadway roles were in comedies, as Ludlow in Ivor Novello's Fresh Fields (1936), the pompous headmaster, the Rev Edmund Ovington, in Ian Hay's Bachelor Born (1938) and Herbert Soppitt in J. B. Priestley's When We Are Married (1939). After two short runs in unsuccessful new plays, he had a year and a half playing Dr Bradman in Coward's Blithe Spirit, with Clifton Webb, Mildred Natwick, Leonora Corbett and Peggy Wood.

In 1948 Coward once again cast Tonge in Broadway productions of his shows, this time in six of the short plays in the cycle Tonight at 8.30 with Gertrude Lawrence and Graham Payn in the principal roles. Tonge played Murdoch in Ways and Means, Mr Edwards in Red Peppers, Burrows in Family Album, George Cunningham in Shadow Play, Mr Wadhurst in Hands Across the Sea and Henry Gow – Coward's own role in the first production – in Fumed Oak. Tonge appeared in five more Broadway productions between 1948 and 1951, none of which ran for more than two months; they included a six-week run as Sir Andrew Aguecheek in Twelfth Night and a three-week run as Major Benjy in Make Way for Lucia, an adaptation of E. F. Benson's novels.

Among Tonge's cinema roles was Julian Shellhammer in the Christmas film Miracle on 34th Street (1947). He also appeared as Otto in Hans Christian Andersen (1952) and as Chief Inspector Hearne in Witness for the Prosecution (1957). On television, he played District Attorney Cortland in Perry Mason, Dr Robert Means in Dr. Hudson's Secret Journal (1955–57) and General Amherst in Northwest Passage (1958–59).

Tonge died in Hollywood, California. He was survived by his wife, Lyda (1902–1984).

== Partial filmography ==
- Still Waters (1915) as Jed Perkins
- His Double Life (1933) as Leek Twin, Henry
- Miracle on 34th Street (1947) as Julian Shellhammer
- Love from a Stranger (1947) as Dr. Horace Gribble
- O. Henry's Full House (1952) as Man with Umbrella (segment "The Cop and the Anthem") (uncredited)
- Hans Christian Andersen (1952) as Otto
- House of Wax (1953) as Bruce Allison (uncredited)
- Small Town Girl (1953) as Hemmingway
- Scandal at Scourie (1953) as Fred Gogarty
- Elephant Walk (1954) as Planter John Ralph
- Khyber Patrol (1954) as Col. A. Rivington
- Ricochet Romance (1954) as Mr. Webster
- Track of the Cat (1954) as Pa Bridges
- The Silver Chalice (1954) as Ohad
- The Prodigal (1955) as Barber/Surgeon
- Desert Sands (1955) as Cpl. Sandy McTosh
- Pardners (1956) as Mr. Baxter, Footman
- The Peacemaker (1956) as Elijah Maddox
- Les Girls (1957) as Associate Judge
- Witness for the Prosecution (1957) as Inspector Hearne
- Darby's Rangers (1958) as Prof. John Andrews
- Macabre (1958) as Jode Wetherby
- Invisible Invaders (1959) as Dr. Adam Penner (posthumous release)
- This Earth Is Mine (1959) as Dr. Albert Stone (uncredited, posthumous release, final film role)
