= Red Peppers =

Play by Noël Coward

"Men About Town": Noël Coward and Gertrude Lawrence in the original production of Red Peppers

Red Peppers, described as "an interlude with music", is a short comic play in two scenes by Noël Coward. It is one of ten short plays that make up Tonight at 8.30, a cycle written to be performed in groups of three plays across three evenings. The original production, starring Coward and Gertrude Lawrence played in a pre-London tour, and then the West End, and finally New York, in 1935–1937. Red Peppers has been revived periodically and has been adapted for the cinema and television.

The play depicts a second-rate music hall double act, a husband and wife team, who perform two musical numbers, in between which they bicker in their dressing room and quarrel with colleagues.

== Background ==
In the late 1920s and early 1930s, Coward wrote a succession of hits, ranging from the operetta Bitter Sweet (1929) and the epic Cavalcade (1931), requiring a large cast, gargantuan sets and a complex hydraulic stage, to the intimate comedies Private Lives (1930), in which Coward starred alongside Gertrude Lawrence, and Design for Living (1932). Coward said that after Private Lives, he felt that the public enjoyed seeing him and Lawrence together on stage, and so he wrote the play cycle Tonight at 8.30 as "acting, singing, and dancing vehicles for Gertrude Lawrence and myself".

In the programme for the London run Coward wrote:

[T]he idea of presenting three short plays in an evening instead of one long one is far from original. In fact, if one looks back over the years, one finds that the "triple bill" formula has been used, with varying degrees of success, since the earliest days of the theatre. Latterly, however – that is during the last quarter of a century – it has fallen from favour. Occasionally still a curtain-raiser appears in the provinces but wearing a sadly hang-dog expression, because it knows only too well, poor thing, that it would not be there at all were the main attraction of the evening long enough.[…]
A short play, having a great advantage over a long one in that it can sustain a mood without technical creaking or overpadding, deserves a better fate, and if by careful writing, acting, and producing I can do a little towards reinstating it in its rightful pride, I shall have achieved one of my more sentimental ambitions.

All the plays in the cycle starred Coward and Gertrude Lawrence. Coward directed the plays and wrote the words and music for songs in four of them. In this play, billed as "an interlude with music", Coward and Lawrence's characters, George and Lily Pepper, sing the comic duets, "Has Anybody Seen Our Ship?" and "Men About Town".

== First performances ==
Red Peppers was the third of the Tonight at 8.30 cycle to be presented. It opened at the Opera House, Manchester on 15 October 1935, preceded by two other plays from Tonight at 8.30: We Were Dancing and The Astonished Heart.

Tonight at 8.30 opened in London on 9 January 1936 at the Phoenix Theatre, In the first programme of three plays, Red Peppers concluded the evening, preceded by Family Album and The Astonished Heart.

After a try-out in Boston, the Broadway opening took place on 24 November 1936 at the National Theatre, again starring Coward and Lawrence. Red Peppers was included in the second of the three programmes in the cycle, along with The Astonished Heart and Hands Across the Sea.

== Original cast ==
- George Pepper – Noël Coward
- Lily Pepper – Gertrude Lawrence
- Alf – Kenneth Carten
- Bert Bentley – Anthony Pelissier
- Mr. Edwards – Alan Webb
- Mabel Grace – Alison Leggatt (Joyce Carey in New York)

== Plot ==
George and Lily Pepper are a husband-and-wife act touring in provincial music hall. They are seen first onstage, and then in their dressing room, and finally onstage again. They begin in a comedy number, dressed as naval ratings, singing "Has Anybody Seen our Ship?" – two sailors after a spree:

We've lost our way
And we've lost our pay,
And to make the thing complete,
We've been and gone and lost the bloomin' fleet!

Their exit dance is marred when Lily drops her telescope and stops to retrieve it before hurrying after George. In their dressing room they argue as they get ready for their second slot. While the next act is on stage – a non-musical number by a fading West End actress, Mabel Grace – the Peppers receive a visit from the theatre's musical director, Bert Bentley, who asks them to speed up their sailor number. Lily, who blames his over-brisk tempo for her mishap with the telescope, is incensed and a loud row ensues. It is broken off when the call-boy warns Bentley that he is due back in the orchestra pit. The scene ends with a blackout.

The lights come up again revealing the Peppers getting into their white ties and tails for their second number. The theatre manager enters, clearly briefed by Bentley, and a further row develops, interrupted by Mabel Grace complaining of the noise. The tumult is interrupted by the call boy who summons the Peppers for their second number. The curtain falls, and then rises on George and Lily's "dude" number. Their song goes well enough, but for the tap-dance with which the act ends, Bentley vengefully increases the tempo to an impossible speed, George slips and falls and Lily hurls her top hat at Bentley, shouting, "You great drunken fool!". The curtain falls "amid discord".

== Revivals and adaptations ==
Red Peppers has been revived as part of complete, or near-complete cycles of Tonight at 8.30 by the Antaeus Company in Los Angeles in 2007, the Shaw Festival, Canada, in 2009, and the Jermyn Street Theatre, London in 2018. Other revivals of Red Peppers, together with other plays from the cycle, have included a 1947–1948 American tour with Lawrence and Graham Payn, and London productions starring Millicent Martin and Gary Bond (1970) and John Standing and Estelle Kohler (1981).

For the cinema Anthony Pelissier, who had appeared in the original stage production of Tonight at 8.30, directed Meet Me Tonight, (released in the US as Tonight at 8:30) for which Coward wrote the screenplay adapting Red Peppers and two other plays from the cycle. Ted Ray and Kay Walsh played the Peppers.

There were television productions in 1937 (BBC, with Richard Murdoch and Marjorie Sandford); 1938 (BBC, with Richard Haydn and Patricia Hayes); 1948 (BBC, with Graham Payn and Patricia Burke); 1951 (CBS, with Rex Harrison and Beatrice Lillie); 1954 (NBC, with Martyn Green and Ginger Rogers); 1958 (BBC, with Charlie Chester and Eleanor Summerfield); 1960 (CBS, with Art Carney and Elaine Stritch); 1969 (BBC, with Bruce Forsyth and Dora Bryan) and 1991 (BBC, as part of a cycle of Tonight at 8.30, with Anthony Newley and Joan Collins).

In January 1936 Coward and Lawrence recorded a version of the play for His Master's Voice, including both the songs in full, and edited dialogue in between. The Phoenix Theatre Orchestra was conducted by Clifford Greenwood. The recording has been reissued on LP, CD and online. Coward and Lawrence also performed an audio version for American radio, minus the final song, on the 3 December 1936 edition of Rudy Vallee's Royal Gelatin Hour, a recording of which still survives.

== Critical reception ==
Coward wrote of the piece, "Red Peppers is a vaudeville sketch sandwiched in between two parodies of music hall songs. We always enjoyed playing it and the public always enjoyed watching us play it, which, of course, was highly satisfactory". Coward's friend and confidante Lynn Fontanne, who had commented adversely on We Were Dancing, was much more taken with Red Peppers, finding it "very fine and very funny. Their utter third-ratedness is so awfully pathetic. You know exactly why (aside from the pitiful business of their act) they have never been and never could be successful." At the time of the first production, The Times thought Red Peppers the most successful of the plays in the cycle. The critic Charles Morgan wrote, "The theatrical success of the evening belongs without question to Red Peppers … Here, with quarrels and back-chat, Mr Coward the dramatist is comfortably within his range, and Mr Coward the actor, and above all the dancer, knows how, with Miss Lawrence, to make the most of his own swift nonsense."
