= Meet Me Tonight =

- Directed by: Anthony Pelissier
- Written by: Noël Coward
- Based on: three plays from Tonight at 8.30 by Noël Coward
- Produced by: Anthony Havelock-Allan
- Starring: Valerie Hobson; Stanley Holloway; Nigel Patrick; Ted Ray; Kay Walsh; Jack Warner.
- Cinematography: Desmond Dickinson
- Edited by: Clive Donner
- Music by: Noël Coward; Eric Rogers (orchestrated and conducted)
- Production company: British Film-Makers
- Distributed by: General Film Distributors (U.K.)
- Release date: 9 September 1952 (London)
- Running time: 81 minutes
- Country: United Kingdom
- Language: English
- Box office: £97,000

Meet Me Tonight (U.S. title: Tonight at 8:30 in the U.S.) is a 1952 omnibus British comedy film directed by Anthony Pelissier and starring Valerie Hobson, Nigel Patrick, Stanley Holloway, Ted Ray and Jack Warner. It was written by Noël Coward, adapted from three of his one act plays: Red Peppers, Fumed Oak and Ways and Means, part of his Tonight at 8.30 play cycle.

== Plot ==
In "The Red Peppers", a husband and wife song and dance team bicker with each other, another performer, and the theatre manager.

In "Fumed Oak", a middle-aged man finally has enough of his wife, daughter, and mother-in-law. Having saved enough money secretly, he announces to his stunned family that he is leaving, never to see them again.

In the final segment, "Ways and Means", a husband and his wife wonder what they will do now that he has gambled away their money, leaving little to pay their debts, especially to Olive. They pawn their last few valuable possessions, hoping to win enough in the casino. However, Olive takes the seat the husband was waiting for and proceeds to win a great deal of money. When she gets up, he takes his rightful place and loses all he has. That night, the couple awake to find Olive's chauffeur, Murdoch, trying to steal from them. After laughing at him (since they have nothing worth the effort), the wife proposes he rob from his employer and split the money with them. Murdoch takes Olive's winnings, but double crosses the couple, only to end up caught by the police.

== Cast ==
- Kay Walsh as Lily Pepper
- Ted Ray as George Pepper
- Martita Hunt as Mabel Grace
- Frank Pettingell as Mr. Edwards
- Bill Fraser as Bert Bentley
- Toke Townley as stage manager
- Boy as Ian Wilson as Call
- Frank's Fox Terriers as performing dog act
- The Young China Troupe as Chinese jugglers
- Stanley Holloway as Henry Gow
- Betty Ann Davies as Doris Gow
- Mary Merrall as Mrs. Rocket (Grandma)
- Dorothy Gordon as Elsie
- Valerie Hobson as Stella Cartwright
- Nigel Patrick as Toby Cartwright
- Jack Warner as Murdoch
- Jessie Royce Landis as Olive
- Michael Trubshawe as Chaps
- Mary Jerrold as Nanny
- Yvonne Furneaux as Elena
- Jacques Cey as The Fence

== Production ==
A very successful film, Brief Encounter (1945), had been made from Still Life, one of the plays that made up Tonight at 8:30. In July 1948, Sydney Box, head of Gainsborough Studios bought the rights to film The Astonished Heart from Tonight at 8:30 which resulted in a 1950 film. In late 1948 Box discussed with Coward making a film called Tonight at 8:30 consisting of three plays from the series: Fumed Oak with Kathleen Harrison and Jack Warner, Family Album with Margaret Leighton and Graham Payn, and Red Peppers with Cicely Courtneidge and Jack Hulbert.

This film was not made. In June 1951 Coward discussed the project with Sydney Box again. Rights to the plays passed to the Rank Organisation which had made several successful anthology movies, notably Quartet, Encore and Trio. Producer Tony Havelock Allen later recalled the project as "just to have something to do, more or less."

The movie was financed through the British Film-Makers scheme where Rank provided 70% of the budget and the balance coming from the National Film Finance Corporation.

Filming took place in March 1952 at Pinewood Studios. Producer Anthony Havelock-Allen said director Anthony Pelissier "had many different talents but none of them big enough to make a real impact. Look at The Rocking Horse Winner — he certainly had talent but he never got enough chances. He was a difficult man but, then, so was the man who made Kind Hearts and Coronets, yet that didn’t stop him from being a great director.

Havelock-Allen said, "Noél was rather unkind about" the film "but he made what I think was a valid point: he said that the point of the ‘Red Peppers’ segment was to spend an evening seeing Noél Coward and Gertie Lawrence not playing Noél Coward and Gertie Lawrence, that is the fun; that the moment you do one of these little plays for real, they don’t exist."

== Reception ==
=== Box office ===
The film was not a success at the box office and earned billings of £97,000.

=== Critical ===
Variety called it "somewhat dated entertainment" in which "all three items have been skillfully directed."

The Guardian called it "a disappointment" although "passable popular entertainment."

The Daily Telegraph declared "nobody dazzles in the film, and the material, seen in a cold light, seemed thin, even dull."

Filmink called it "a disaster, poorly directed, adapted, cast and acted – we don’t think anyone liked it, then or now, and it was a flop."

The New York Times wrote, "Tonight at 8:30 is, in short, a varied entertainment, short on excitement but funny and trenchant enough for many tastes."

Coward saw the film in September 1952 and described it in his diary as "absolutely awful – vilely directed and, with one or two minor exceptions, abominably acted."

== Notes ==
- Coward, Noël (2000). The Noël Coward diaries.
