= Moya Nugent =

British actress and singer

1921 studio portrait by Bassano

Moya Nugent (27 March 1901 – 26 January 1954) was a British actress and singer. She made a few broadcasts and three silent films but was chiefly known as a stage performer, and was particularly associated with the works of Noël Coward, appearing in twelve of his plays and two of his revues. Before that, she appeared early in her career in Peter Pan, and was cast in other children's plays and pantomimes. She was in the West End casts of revues by Cole Porter and others, and in musical comedies such as Lilac Time.

Her last stage role was in 1950; she died suddenly in 1954, aged 52.

== Life and career ==
Nugent was born in Dublin. At the age of ten she made her first appearance on the stage, at the Playhouse Theatre, London on 21 September 1911, as Meenie in Rip Van Winkle. Later that year she played the Baby Mermaid and Liza in Peter Pan at the Duke of York's Theatre, repeating the roles in the three succeeding annual revivals of the play. Between then and 1920 she appeared as Maggie in The Ever-Open Door (Aldwych Theatre, 1913) and Isabella in Quality Street (Duke of York's, 1913), followed by two revues, More and Pell-Mell (Ambassadors Theatre, 1915), the part of Emily in Cyril Harcourt's Wanted, A Husband. In the Christmas seasons of 1918 and 1919 she played the Princess in Old King Cole at the Grand Opera House, Belfast and the Gaiety Theatre, Dublin.

=== Coward roles ===
Nugent first met Noël Coward when they were both child actors in Peter Pan. In 1920 she began her connexion with his plays, as Joyce Dermott in I'll Leave It to You in the pre-London run in Manchester and the West End run at the theatre then known as the New but now called the Noël Coward Theatre. She appeared in two Coward revues: This Year of Grace (London Pavilion, 1928), and Words and Music (Adelphi Theatre, 1932 and in its revised version Set to Music, at the Music Box, New York, 1939). Between the two revues she played Daisy Devon in Cavalcade at the Theatre Royal, Drury Lane.

The first of her later roles in Coward plays was Martha James in Conversation Piece (His Majesty's Theatre and 44th Street Theatre, New York, 1934–35). In 1935 and 1936 she played parts in seven of the ten Tonight at 8.30 cycle, in the pre-London tour, and then at the Phoenix Theatre, London, and finally the National Theatre, New York. Her parts were: Eva Blake in We Were Dancing; Walters in Hands Across the Sea; Elsie Gow, the adenoidal schoolgirl, in Fumed Oak; Emily Valance in Family Album; Princess Elena Krassiloff in Ways and Means; Beryl Waters in Still Life; and Hester More in the single performance given of Star Chamber.

In 1938 she played Blanche Wallace in Operette at His Majesty's. Her longest-running Coward role was Mrs Bradman in Blithe Spirit which she played throughout its run of 1,997 performances in 1941 to 1946. Her final Coward role was Miss Scobie in Pacific 1860 at Drury Lane in 1946.

=== Other stage roles ===
Nugent played in three more pantomimes and children's shows after her early appearances in them: the title role in Cinderella (Theatre Royal, Edinburgh 1920); Polly Perkins in Robinson Crusoe (Opera House, Manchester, 1926), and Zoe in The Three Musketeers (Drury Lane, 1930). She appeared in Lilac Time in 1922 in the role of Tilli, and in Cole Porter's revue Wake Up and Dream in 1929.

In the 1930s Nugent appeared as Sally Hamil in The New Gossoon (Apollo Theatre, 1931); Miss Pratt in Nymph Errant (Adelphi Theatre, 1933); Gladys in George and Margaret (Morosco Theatre New York, 1937); Essie in You Can't Take It With You (St. James's Theatre, 1937); and various roles in Harold French's revue All Clear (Queen's, 1939).

Her roles in the 1940s were Mrs Finch in Through the Door (Q Theatre, 1946); Countess Adelaise in The Bird Seller (Palace Theatre, 1947); May Carey in Castle Anna (Lyric Theatre, Hammersmith, 1948); Miss Dennington in Calypso (Playhouse, 1948); Miss Ranklin in The Schoolmistress (Saville Theatre, 1950); Mary Willoughby in Dear Miss Phoebe (Phoenix Theatre 1950).

=== Broadcasting, recording and film ===
For the BBC Nugent made occasional studio broadcasts, as a singer on variety programmes, and as an actress in both light and serious drama, including the popular Mrs Dale's Diary. She was also heard in relays of shows and plays in which she was appearing in the West End, including All Clear, Blithe Spirit and London to Brighton.

Nugent made few records, but for HMV in 1934 she recorded two numbers from Conversation Piece – "Dear Little Soldiers" (with Madie Andrews) and "There's Always Something Fishy About the French" (with Heather Thatcher).

In silent films, Nugent played the Marchioness in a 1913 adaptation of The Old Curiosity Shop, Sybil Garfield in The Lights of Home (1920); and was in The Auction Mart in 1920.

=== Death ===
Nugent collapsed and died on 26 January 1954, aged 52, while rehearsing for a new play, All Night Sitting, at the Cambridge Theatre.

== Sources ==
- Mander, Raymond; Joe Mitchenson (1957). Theatrical Companion to Coward. London: Rockliff. OCLC 470106222.
- Parker, John (1978). Who Was Who in the Theatre, 1912–1976. Detroit: Gale. ISBN 978-0-8103-0406-2.
