= Still Life (play) =

Play by Noël Coward

Dolly (Everley Gregg), Alec (Noël Coward) and Laura (Gertrude Lawrence) in the final scene

Still Life is a short play in five scenes by Noël Coward, one of ten plays that make up Tonight at 8.30, a cycle written to be performed across three evenings. (Note: One of the ten, Star Chamber, was given one performance and immediately dropped; it is seldom revived, and throughout Coward's lifetime the published texts of the cycle omitted it.) One-act plays were unfashionable in the 1920s and 30s, but Coward was fond of the genre and conceived the idea of a set of short pieces to be played across several evenings. The actress most closely associated with him was Gertrude Lawrence, and he wrote the plays as vehicles for them both.

The play portrays the chance meeting, subsequent love affair, and eventual parting of a married woman and a physician. The sadness of their serious and secretive affair is contrasted throughout the play with the boisterous, uncomplicated relationship of a second couple. Still Life differs from most of the plays in the cycle by having an unhappy ending.

The play was first produced in London in May 1936 and was staged in New York in October of that year. It has been revived frequently and has been adapted for television and radio and, as Brief Encounter, for the cinema.

== Background and first productions ==
Short plays had been popular in the previous century, often as curtain-raisers and afterpieces to longer plays. By the 1920s they had gone out of fashion, but Coward was fond of the genre and wrote several early in his career. He wrote, "A short play, having a great advantage over a long one in that it can sustain a mood without technical creaking or over padding, deserves a better fate, and if, by careful writing, acting and producing I can do a little towards reinstating it in its rightful pride, I shall have achieved one of my more sentimental ambitions." In 1935 he conceived the idea of a set of short plays, to run in varying permutations on three consecutive nights at the theatre. His biographer Philip Hoare describes it as "a bold idea, risky and innovative". Coward finished writing all ten of the plays by the end of August 1935.

The actress most closely associated with Coward was Gertrude Lawrence, his oldest friend, with whom he had first acted as a child in Hannele in 1913. They starred together in his revue London Calling! (1923) and his comedy Private Lives (1930–31), and he wrote the Tonight at 8.30 plays "as acting, singing and dancing vehicles for Gertrude Lawrence and myself". Coward directed the plays as well as acting in them. They were performed in various combinations of three. (Note: The programme of plays chosen for each performance was advertised in advance.)

Most of the plays in Tonight at 8.30 were tried out in a pre-London tour, but three, including Still Life, were first given after the cycle opened in London. (Note: The others were Star Chamber (played once and then dropped) and Ways and Means.) Still Life was first presented on 18 May 1936 at the Phoenix Theatre, the second play in a programme that also contained Ways and Means and Family Album. Coward had thought of using the title Still Life before – for the American production of his 1925 comedy Hay Fever, although in the event it was given under its original title.

The cycle played to full houses, and the limited season closed on 20 June, after 157 performances. (Note: Coward, who disliked long runs, and also needed to set aside time to write and compose, usually insisted on playing a part for no longer than six months: "preferably three months in New York and three months in London") The Broadway premiere was at the National Theatre on 24 November 1936, with mostly the same cast as in London. As in the London premiere, the programme also included Ways and Means and Family Album. The New York run of the cycle, a limited season, as in London, ended prematurely because Coward was taken ill. (Note: The play closed for a week at the beginning of March because Coward was unwell. It was announced that he was suffering from laryngitis, but in fact it was a nervous breakdown, brought on by overwork. The run resumed on 8 March, but after two performances Coward's doctor insisted that he withdraw completely, and the last Broadway performance was given on 9 March.)

Still Life is one of the two plays in the cycle that end unhappily; the other is The Astonished Heart. For their premieres Coward placed each in the middle of its triple-bill, with a comedy before and after.

== Roles and original cast ==
- Alec Harvey – Noël Coward
- Laura Jesson – Gertrude Lawrence
- Myrtle Bagot – Joyce Carey
- Beryl Waters – Moya Nugent
- Young Man – Charles Peters
- Stanley – Kenneth Carten
- Albert Godby, ticket collector – Alan Webb
- Bill, a soldier – Edward Underdown
- Johnnie, a soldier – Anthony Pelissier
- Mildred – Betty Hare
- Dolly Messiter – Everley Gregg (Joan Swinstead in New York)

== Plot ==
The play's five scenes are set across the span of a year, from April to March. It charts the love affair between Laura Jesson, a housewife, and Alec Harvey, a married physician. The location is the refreshment room of "Milford Junction" railway station.

In the first scene Myrtle, who runs the station buffet, rebuffs the attempts of Albert, the ticket-inspector, to flirt with her. Laura is waiting for her train home after shopping. She is in pain from a piece of grit that has been blown into her eye. Alec introduces himself as a doctor and quickly removes it for her. She thanks him and goes to catch her train.

Three months later Alec and Laura are once more in the refreshment room. It becomes clear that after their first meeting they encountered each other a second time by chance and have enjoyed each other's company to the extent of arranging to lunch together and go to the cinema. There have been several such meetings. Laura is beginning to wonder about the propriety of meeting him so often, but Alec reminds her that he too is married, with children and other responsibilities.

In the third scene, set in October, Albert and Myrtle continue their slightly combative flirtation. Alec and Laura come in, and over coffee they admit that they are in love with each other. They are both determined not to upset their happy marriages, but will meet secretly. They make arrangements to meet at the flat of a friend of Alec.

By December they are both agonised by guilt and agree that their affair must stop. Alec tells Laura that he has been offered an attractive medical post in South Africa and will accept it unless she asks him not to.

The fifth and final scene is set in March. Albert seems to be making progress with Myrtle. Alec and Laura enter. He is leaving to take up his new post in South Africa, and she has come to see him off. They are prevented from having the passionate farewell they both yearn for when Dolly, a talkative friend of hers intrudes into their last moments together, and their final goodbye is cruelly limited to a formal handshake. He leaves, and Laura remains, while Dolly talks on. Suddenly, as the sound of the approaching express train is heard, Laura suddenly rushes out to the platform. She returns "looking very white and shaky". Dolly persuades Myrtle to pour some brandy for Laura, who sips it. The sound of their train is heard, and Dolly gathers up her parcels as the curtain falls.

== Reception ==
Coward later said of the play, "Still Life was the most mature play of the whole series. ... It is well written, economical and well constructed: the characters, I think, are true, and I can say now, reading it with detachment after so many years, that I am proud to have written it." John Lahr, in his 1982 book on Coward's plays, disagreed: "when he wrote himself into the role of an ardent heterosexual lover ... the characterisation is wooden. The master of the comic throw-away becomes too loquacious when he gets serious, and his fine words ring false." At the first production, critical opinion agreed with Coward. The Times called it "a serious and sympathetic study of humdrum people suddenly trapped by love" and strongly praised Coward both for the play and his performance. In a 1989 study of Coward, Milton Levin wrote:

The theme that basic decency wins out is hardly a novel idea. Yet, both characters and their situation are endowed with a weight and substance that are rare for Coward. In large part the solidity of the refreshment room gives such reality to the lovers, but they are also very carefully observed individuals. Finally, and perhaps most significantly, the whole play is given life and its fullest pathos by the restrained dialogue, in which little is said but much implied.

Levin suggests that when Laura rushes onto the platform as the express train thunders by she has suicide in mind; this possibility is made explicit in the film adaptation of the play, Brief Encounter.

== Revivals and adaptations ==
=== Theatre ===
Fay Compton led an Australian tour in 1937–38 in three plays from Tonight at 8.30; in Still Life she played Laura to Bruno Barnabe's Alec. A Broadway revival in 1967 starred Priscilla Morrill and Denholm Elliott as Laura and Alec. In 2000, the Williamstown Theatre Festival revived Still Life and five other plays from the cycle. The Antaeus Company in Los Angeles revived all ten plays of the cycle in October 2007, and the Shaw Festival did so in 2009.

In the first professional revival of the cycle in Britain, (Note: Omitting Star Chamber.) given by English Touring Theatre in 2014 Shereen Martin played Laura and Gyuri Sarossy played Alec. In London, nine of the ten plays in the cycle were given at the Jermyn Street Theatre in 2018. (Note: The omitted play was Fumed Oak.) In Still Life Miranda Foster and Nick Waring played Laura and Alec.

=== Television and radio ===
An American television version of Still Life was broadcast in 1951 with Margaret Sullavan and Wendell Corey as Laura and Alec. In 1991 BBC television mounted productions of the individual plays of the Tonight at 8.30 cycle, starring Joan Collins. In most of the plays she took the Lawrence roles, but in Still Life she played Myrtle; Jane Asher played Laura and John Alderton was Alec.

A 1947 ABC radio adaptation of Still Life (with elements added from the 1945 film script – see below) starred Ingrid Bergman and Sam Wanamaker. The BBC broadcast a radio adaptation of the play in 1998, with Amanda Root and John Duttine as Laura and Alec.

=== Cinema ===
After the successful production of the play, Coward expanded and adapted it into a full-length film script, Brief Encounter (1945), which was directed by David Lean, with Celia Johnson and Trevor Howard in the roles originally played by Lawrence and Coward. A radio adaptation of the film was broadcast in 1955, and the following year Coward made a version for two voices which he recorded with Margaret Leighton for Caedmon Records. A French translation was given in Paris in 1968 under the title Brève Rencontre (presented in tandem with Nous Dansons), and in the same year, along with Fumed Oak, it formed the basis for a musical, not by Coward, called Mr and Mrs. (Note: Mr and Mrs was based on Fumed Oak in the first half and Still Life in the second. Book, music and lyrics were by John Taylor, co-author of Charlie Girl, which ran from 1965 to 1971 in the West End. Mr and Mrs ran there for 44 performances in 1967–68. John Neville played Alec, Honor Blackman Laura and Hylda Baker Myrtle.) The film was remade in 1974 starring Richard Burton and Sophia Loren. The 1945 film version was made into an opera, Brief Encounter, composed by André Previn to a libretto by John Caird, commissioned by the Houston Grand Opera and premiered in 2009. It starred Elizabeth Futral as Laura and Nathan Gunn as Alec. A recording was issued on the Deutsche Grammophon label.

== Sources ==
- Ashby, Justine; Higson, Andrew (2013). British Cinema, Past and Present. London: Routledge. ISBN 978-0-415-22061-3.
- Coward, Noël (1979). Plays: 3. London: Methuen. ISBN 978-0-413-46100-1.
- Hawes, William (2015). Live Television Drama, 1946-1951. Jefferson: McFarland. ISBN 978-1-4766-0849-5.
- Hoare, Philip (1995). Noël Coward, A Biography. London: Sinclair-Stevenson. ISBN 978-1-4081-0675-4.
- Lahr, John (1982). Coward the Playwright. London: Methuen. ISBN 978-0-413-48050-7.
- Levin, Milton (1989). Noël Coward. Boston: Twayne. ISBN 978-0-8057-6978-4.
- Morley, Sheridan (1974) [1969]. A Talent to Amuse. London: Penguin. ISBN 978-0-14-003863-7.
- Morley, Sheridan (1999). "Introduction". Coward: Plays 7. London: Bloomsbury. ISBN 978-0-4137-3400-6.
- Morley, Sheridan (2005). Noël Coward. London: Haus Publishing. ISBN 978-1-90-434188-8.
