= Ways and Means (Coward play) =

Play by Noël Coward

Coward and Lawrence at the end of Ways and Means

Ways and Means is a short comic play by Noël Coward, one of ten that make up Tonight at 8.30, a cycle written to be performed across three evenings. The story concerns an heiress and her gambling husband, who are plagued by debt and embarrassment as everything seems to always go wrong for them. Their honour is saved just in time when a disgraced chauffeur tries to rob them but amiably ends up pulling them out of a hole.

In the introduction to a published edition of the plays, Coward wrote, "A short play, having a great advantage over a long one in that it can sustain a mood without technical creaking or over padding, deserves a better fate, and if, by careful writing, acting and producing I can do a little towards reinstating it in its rightful pride, I shall have achieved one of my more sentimental ambitions."

The play was first produced in London (1936), and then in New York (1936–1937). It has enjoyed several major revivals and has been adapted for film.

== History ==
Six of the plays in Tonight at 8.30 were first presented at the Manchester Opera House beginning on 15 October 1935, and a seventh play, Family Album, was added on the subsequent provincial tour. Ways and Means was added for the London run, together with Still Life and Star Chamber, the last of which was performed only once. The first London performance in the cycle was on 9 January 1936 at the Phoenix Theatre, but Ways and Means did not premiere until 5 May 1936.

Coward directed all ten pieces, and each starred Coward and Gertrude Lawrence. Coward said that he wrote them as "acting, singing, and dancing vehicles for Gertrude Lawrence and myself". The plays were performed in various combinations of three at each performance during the original run. The plays chosen for each performance were announced in advance, although a myth evolved that the groupings were random. Matinées were sometimes billed as Today at 2:30.

The Broadway openings for the three parts took place on 24 November 1936, 27 November 1936 and 30 November 1936 (including Ways and Means) at the National Theatre, again starring Coward and Lawrence. Star Chamber was omitted. The London and New York runs were limited only by Coward's boredom at long engagements.

Major productions of parts of the cycle were revived on Broadway in 1948 and 1967, including Ways and Means in 1948 but not 1967. Revivals in 1981 at the Lyric Theatre in London and at the Chichester Festival in 2006 omitted Ways and Means. In 1971, the Shaw Festival revived three of the plays, and in 2000, the Williamstown Theatre Festival revived six of them, in both cases omitting Ways and Means. However, the Antaeus Company in Los Angeles revived all ten plays in October 2007, and the Shaw Festival is scheduled to revive the full cycle in 2009.

Ideas from the play were used in the 1942 film We Were Dancing. For a 1952 film Meet Me Tonight, directed by Anthony Pelissier, Coward adapted Ways and Means, Red Peppers and Fumed Oak (called Tonight at 8:30 in the US) In 1991, BBC television mounted productions of the individual plays with Joan Collins taking the Lawrence roles. The sheer expense involved in mounting what are effectively ten different productions has usually deterred revivals of the entire Tonight at 8.30 cycle, but the constituent plays can often be seen individually or in sets of three.

== Synopsis ==
Setting: In the bedroom of a French villa on the Côte d'Azur where heiress Stella Cartwright and her gambling husband Toby are staying.

Scene 1 – Half-past eleven o'clock on an April morning

Stella and Toby are eating breakfast and discussing how they plan to recover the 50 pounds lost last night at the casino. Stella remembers that Lord Chapworth ("Chaps" for short) owes her a lot of money and, to their delight, the butler leads him in. Stella tries to use sex appeal to collect the debt, but Chaps doesn't catch on and goes on to say that he lost all his money due to getting stuck at the same table with Pearl Brandt. Stella tries to recuperate, but then the landowner, Olive Lloyde Ransome, and a very dopey Elena Krassiloff enter the room. Elena begins to tinker with random objects while Olive informs Toby and Stella that more guests are arriving the next afternoon, and they have to leave. The butler returns to inform them that their train tickets had already been booked, and they realise that the whole thing was set up to oust them. In desperation, Toby gathers up all the jewellery and sends Nanny to Cannes to pawn it so that he can try to win at the casino. Stella warns him, "You'll lose it, I know you will. I wish I could play the damned game."

Scene 2 – Half-past one o'clock the next morning

Stella and Toby recount the events of the evening. Just as Tony was about to join a game of baccarat, Pearl Brandt steals his seat and wins 170,000 francs, while Toby loses all of his money. After debating minor details, Toby comes up with a plan whereby they might save themselves: they will rob and murder Pearl Brandt. Toby becomes overwhelmed, and Stella orders him to stop and get ready for bed. Another argument ensues, and Toby storms into the bathroom and bangs his head on the cupboard. Stella leads him to the bed and says that she plans to abandon their humility and borrow enough money to get them home.

Scene 3 – Two hours later

An armed robber enters the room and carelessly trips on a chair, waking Toby and Stella. He aims his gun at them and demands their jewellery, but they tell him that they have none. A scuffle ensues, and Toby ends up with the gun. They unmask the robber and discover that he is Stevens, a well known chauffeur. Stevens reveals to them that he lost his job (after having sex with his boss's wife) and is desperate for money. Stella starts to feel sympathetic, but Toby orders him out and threatens to call the police. All of a sudden, Stella realises that Stevens could be useful and pulls him back in. Her plan is to make Stevens rob the other guests, give them the money, and tie them up to make them look like victims. Toby doesn't catch on and is resistant until Stella mentions Pearl Brandt. Stevens runs off while Toby and Stella pull apart the bed sheets so that they can be used to bind them. Stevens returns with the money and jewellery and proceeds to bind and gag Stella and Toby. He leaves while they double over in laughter at their good fortune.

== Roles and original cast ==
- Stella Cartwright – Gertrude Lawrence
- Toby Cartwright – Noël Coward
- Gaston – Kenneth Carten
- Lord Chapworth – Alan Webb
- Olive Lloyd-Ransome – Joyce Carey (Joan Swinstead in New York)
- Princess Elena Krassiloff – Moya Nugent
- Murdoch – Anthony Pelissier
- Nannie – Everly Gregg (Joyce Carey in New York)
- Stevens – Edward Underdown
