= I'll Leave It to You =

Play by Noël Coward

Bobbie (Noël Coward) and Faith (Esmé Wynne), 1920

I'll Leave It to You is a play by Noël Coward. He wrote it in 1919, when he was aged 19, and it was produced in Manchester and then the West End of London in 1920.

Described as "a light comedy in three acts", the play portrays an uncle's successful stratagem to provoke his idle nieces and nephews into working hard and making careers for themselves.

== Background ==
Noël Coward had been a child actor and then a budding juvenile lead. In his spare time, encouraged by his close friend and colleague Esmé Wynne, he began to write stories, songs and plays. He was further encouraged by the producer Gilbert Miller, who suggested the idea for I'll Leave It to You. Miller presented the play at the Gaiety Theatre, Manchester, on 3 May 1920, directed by Stanley Bell; it ran for 24 performances there and then transferred to the New Theatre (now the Noël Coward Theatre) in London, where it ran from 21 July for 37 performances. It was the first of Coward's plays to be staged.

== Roles and original cast ==
- Mrs Dermott – Kate Cutler

Her children:
- Oliver – Douglas Jefferies
- Evangeline – Muriel Pope
- Sylvia – Stella Jesse
- Bobbie – Noël Coward
- Joyce – Moya Nugent

- Daniel Davis (her brother) – Farren Soutar (Manchester); E. Holman Clark (London)
- Mrs Crombie – Lois Stuart
- Faith Crombie – Esmé Wynne
- Griggs (butler) – David Clarkson

== Plot ==
The widowed Mrs Dermott is struggling to maintain her large country house. Her children are unenthusiastic about earning a living to help support the household. Her brother arrives from South America, where he owns a mine. He tells the family that he has three years to live and will leave his large fortune to whichever of his five nieces and nephews carves out the most successful career.

All five rise to the challenge, in a diverse range of employment – industry, painting, music, acting, and novel-writing. Within eighteen months they all make good, and once it is clear that they have done so, Uncle Daniel reveals that he is in excellent health but has no money – his mine is unproductive and worthless. They are at first indignant at his deception, but one by one they recognise that he has deceived them for their own good, and that without him they would not be the successes they have become. Finally a telegram arrives for Daniel, announcing the discovery of gold in his mine. There is jubilation all round, except from his favourite niece, Sylvia, who asks him quietly, "Uncle, did you send that telegram to yourself?". "Yes!!" he admits, as the curtain falls.

== Critical reception ==
Neville Cardus's praise in The Manchester Guardian was grudging: he called the play "an essay in facetiousness". Notices for the London production were mixed, but encouraging. The Observer commented, "Mr Coward... has a sense of comedy, and if he can overcome a tendency to smartness, he will probably produce a good play one of these days." The Daily Mail thought the piece "freshly written and brightly acted" despite "a certain striving after comic effect". The Times was enthusiastic: "It is a remarkable piece of work from so young a head – spontaneous, light, and always 'brainy'."

== References and sources ==
=== Sources ===
- Levin, Milton (1989). Noël Coward. Boston: Twayne. OCLC 1001990975.
- Mander, Raymond; Joe Mitchenson (1957). Theatrical Companion to Coward. London: Rockliff. OCLC 470106222.
