= We Were Dancing (film) =

1942 film by Robert Zigler Leonard

- Directed by: Robert Z. Leonard
- Screenplay by: Claudine West; Hans Rameau; George Froeschel
- Based on: We Were Dancing 1935 play by Noël Coward; Ways and Means 1935 play by Noël Coward; Private Lives 1930 play by Noël Coward; Tonight at 8.30 1936 play by Noël Coward
- Produced by: Robert Z. Leonard; Orville O. Dull
- Starring: Norma Shearer; Melvyn Douglas
- Cinematography: Robert Planck
- Edited by: George Boemler
- Music by: Noël Coward; Bronislau Kaper
- Production company: Metro-Goldwyn-Mayer
- Distributed by: Loew's Inc.
- Release date: April 30, 1942; (New York)
- Running time: 95 minutes
- Country: United States
- Language: English
- Budget: $1,085,000
- Box office: $1,079,000

We Were Dancing is a 1942 American romantic comedy film directed by Robert Z. Leonard, written by Claudine West, Hans Rameau and George Froeschel, and starring Norma Shearer and Melvyn Douglas. It is based loosely on Noël Coward's 1935 play of the same name, together with ideas from Ways and Means, another play in Coward's Tonight at 8.30 play cycle, and Coward's Private Lives.

== Plot ==
Vicki Wilomirska, an impoverished Polish princess, falls madly in love while dancing with the charming but penniless Austrian baron Nicki Prax. She ends her engagement to wealthy lawyer Hubert Tyler. Nicki and Vicki marry secretly, but are soon exposed by one of Nicki's ex-girlfriends, home decorator Linda Wayne. Nicki and Vicki support themselves by being professional house guests, in the homes of American nouveau riche, who are impressed by Old World aristocracy. Eventually, Nicki decides to do the unthinkable, and get a job. Linda still pursues Nicki, and Vicki, brokenhearted, sues Nicki for divorce. Attorney Hubert represents Vicki in the divorce case, and despite Nicki's tender declaration of his love, the teary judge grants the divorce.

When Nicki returns from South America, Linda asks him to see her. At her office, Nicki learns from Linda that Vicki and Hubert are now engaged. Nicki soon persuades Linda to help him get a decorating job with her competitor, who is decorating the new house that Hubert is building for Vicki. Nicki begins the work by behaving professionally, but eventually confesses that he still loves only Vicki. Vicki tells Nicki that he is now too late. At the fancy betrothal party for Hubert and Vicki, Nicki comes to say goodbye to Vicki. Then, they dance to the same waltz that had ignited their passion when they first met, and the magic returns. Nicki and Vicki elope once more.

== Cast ==
- Norma Shearer as Vicki Wilomirska
- Melvyn Douglas as Nicki Prax
- Gail Patrick as Linda Wayne
- Lee Bowman as Hubert Tyler
- Marjorie Main as Judge Sidney Hawkes
- Reginald Owen as Major Tyler-Blane
- Alan Mowbray as Grand Duke Basil
- Florence Bates as Mrs. Vanderlip
- Heather Thatcher as Mrs. Tyler-Blane
- Connie Gilchrist as Olive Ransome
- Nella Walker as Mrs. Janet Bentley
- Adriana Caselotti as Opera Singer
- Florence Shirley as Mrs. Charteris
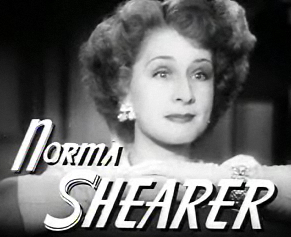
Norma Shearer

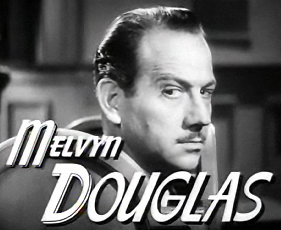
Melvyn Douglas

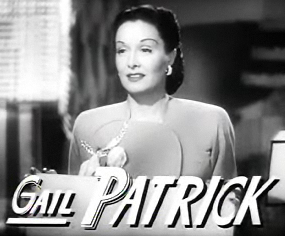
Gail Patrick

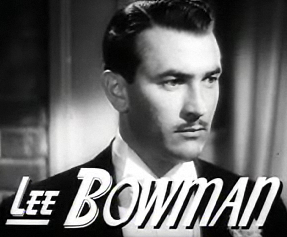
Lee Bowman

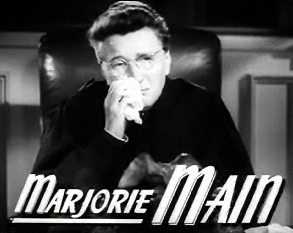
Marjorie Main

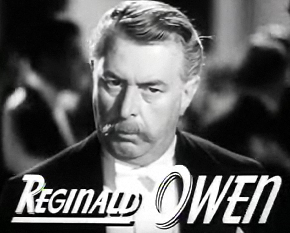
Reginald Owen

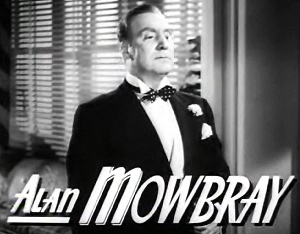
Alan Mowbray

== Reception ==
According to MGM records the film made $581,000 in the US and Canada and $498,000 elsewhere, making the studio a loss of $409,000.

== See also ==
- Private Lives - 1931 film starring Norma Shearer, based on play by Noël Coward
