= Brief Encounter (1974 film) =

British television film

- Original Movie Poster
- Genre: Drama
- Based on: Still Life; 1936 play by Noël Coward
- Written by: John Bowen
- Directed by: Alan Bridges
- Starring: Richard Burton; Sophia Loren; Jack Hedley; Rosemary Leach
- Composer: Cyril Ornadel
- Countries of origin: United Kingdom; Italy
- Original language: English

Production
- Executive producer: Duane Bogie
- Producers: Cecil Clarke; Carlo Ponti
- Production locations: Winchester, Hampshire, England; Shawford, Hampshire, England; Brockenhurst Station, Brockenhurst, Hampshire, England; New Forest, Hampshire, England; City Centre, Winchester, Hampshire, England
- Cinematography: Arthur Ibbetson
- Editor: Peter Weatherley
- Running time: 100 minutes (UK)
- Production company: ITC Films

Original release
- Network: NBC
- Release: 12 November 1974

Brief Encounter is a 1974 British-Italian television film starring Richard Burton and Sophia Loren. It was adapted from the play Still Life by Noël Coward.

== Plot ==
Two strangers, each married to another, meet at a railway station and find themselves in a brief but intense affair.

== Main cast ==
- Richard Burton as Alec Harvey
- Sophia Loren as Anna Jesson
- Jack Hedley as Graham Jesson
- Rosemary Leach as Mrs Gaines
- Ann Firbank as Melanie Harvey
- John Le Mesurier as Stephen
- Patricia Franklin as Beryl Walters

== Production ==
The screenplay was adapted from the play Still Life by Noël Coward. This was also the basis for the David Lean's famous earlier film, Brief Encounter (1945).

== Release ==
The film had its premiere on U.S. television on 12 November 1974 as part of the Hallmark Hall of Fame series on NBC.

== Reception ==
The two lead roles were cast with "wild disregard for suitability," according to Brian McFarlane, who has described the film as "a total disaster." Originally intended to have a television screening in the United States followed by a cinema release in the rest of the world, its poor reception in New York led to the international plans being abandoned. Rank, who owned the theatrical rights in the UK, sold them to television. According to David Shipman, reviewing Burton's career in The Great Movie Stars, this remake was "widely viewed as a ludicrous undertaking."

== Novel ==
A novelisation of the film, written by Alec Waugh, was published in 1975.
