= Operette (musical) =

Kenneth Carten, Ross Landon, John Gatrell and Hugh French sing "The Stately Homes of England"

Operette is a musical in two acts composed, written and produced by Noël Coward. The show is a period piece, set in the year 1906 at the fictional "Jubilee" theatre. The story concerns an ageing Viennese operetta star, who warns the young ingenue not to marry a nobleman.

The piece premiered in 1938. Coward's attempt to follow up the mittel-European nostalgia of his hit operetta Bitter Sweet (1929) was not a success and ran for only 132 performances. It nevertheless contained songs that endured, in Coward's cabaret act and elsewhere, such as "The Stately Homes of England".

== Production ==
Operette was first performed at the Manchester Opera House, from 17 February 1938 to 12 March 1938. It then transferred to His Majesty's Theatre in London on 16 March 1938, closing on 9 July 1938.

There are 35 speaking parts in the musical, and in the original production there was a company of 80. The show is a period piece, set in the year 1906 at the fictional "Jubilee" theatre. Coward directed the production. Wood and Massary were supported by Griffith Jones as the young peer who falls in love with the heroine, and Irene Vanbrugh as his mother.

== Synopsis ==
Cast in an Edwardian musical comedy, The Model Maid, Liesl Haren, a fading Viennese operetta star, has one more chance at stardom. Young Rozanne Grey, a member of the sextet of The Model Maid, falls in love with Nigel Vaynham, a nobleman serving in the army. Liesl counsels the younger woman not to marry him. Rozanne gains the leading role and stardom, but Nigel returns to the army, realising that a marriage to an actress would destroy his social reputation.

== Principal roles and original cast ==
- Maisie Welbey – Phyllis Monkman
- Eddie Gosling – Edward Cooper
- Grace Menteith – Pamela Randell
- Rozanne Gray – Peggy Wood
- Liesl Haren – Fritzi Massary
- Paul Trevor – Max Oldaker
- Elsie Jewell – Muriel Baron
- Nigel Vaynham – Griffith Jones
- David Messiter – Peter Vokes
- Lady Messiter – Irene Vanbrugh

== Musical numbers ==
- Prologue
- The Opening Chorus
- Pom-pom
- Countess Mitzi
- Dearest love
- Foolish virgins
- The stately homes of England
- Where are the songs we sung?
- The island of Bollamazoo
- Prologue, Act II
- Sing for joy
- My dear Miss Dale
- Operette

The Noël Coward Society's website, drawing on performing statistics from the publishers and the Performing Rights Society, ranks "The stately homes of England" as among Coward's ten most popular songs.
