= Tonight at 8.30 =

Series of plays by Noël Coward

Lawrence and Coward in the Broadway production

Tonight at 8.30 (Note: Following the customary punctuation of the day the cycle was originally advertised as To-night at 8.30. The hyphen was retained in the published texts issued during Coward's lifetime, but has been dropped in subsequent editions.) is a cycle of ten one-act plays by Noël Coward, presented in London in 1936 and in New York in 1936–1937, with the author and Gertrude Lawrence in the leading roles. The plays are mostly comedies, but three, The Astonished Heart, Shadow Play and Still Life, are serious. Four of the comedies include songs, with words and music by Coward.

One play, Star Chamber, was dropped after a single performance. The other nine plays were presented in three programmes of three plays each. There have been numerous revivals of many of the individual plays, but revivals of the complete cycle have been much less frequent. Several of the plays have been adapted for the cinema and television.

Tonight at 8.30 was first presented in 1935 in Manchester and then on tour in six other British cities, before opening in London and New York the following year. (Note: In the pre-London tour the title was changed at some theatres to To-night at 7.30, to reflect the local starting times; matinées were sometimes billed as To-day at 2.30.)

== Background ==
In the late 1920s and early 1930s, Coward wrote a succession of hits, ranging from the operetta Bitter Sweet (1929) and the epic Cavalcade (1931), requiring a large cast, gargantuan sets and a complex hydraulic stage, to the intimate comedies Private Lives (1930), in which Coward starred alongside Gertrude Lawrence, and Design for Living (1932). Coward said that after Private Lives, he felt that the public enjoyed seeing him and Lawrence together on stage, and so he wrote the play cycle Tonight at 8.30 as "acting, singing, and dancing vehicles for Gertrude Lawrence and myself".

In the programme for the London run Coward wrote:

[T]he idea of presenting three short plays in an evening instead of one long one is far from original. In fact, if one looks back over the years, one finds that the "triple bill" formula has been used, with varying degrees of success, since the earliest days of the theatre. Latterly, however – that is during the last quarter of a century – it has fallen from favour. Occasionally still a curtain-raiser appears in the provinces but wearing a sadly hang-dog expression, because it knows only too well, poor thing, that it would not be there at all were the main attraction of the evening long enough.[…]
A short play, having a great advantage over a long one in that it can sustain a mood without technical creaking or overpadding, deserves a better fate, and if by careful writing, acting, and producing I can do a little towards reinstating it in its rightful pride, I shall have achieved one of my more sentimental ambitions.

== Plays ==
The cycle consists of ten plays. In order of first production they are:

- We Were Dancing – "A comedy in two scenes"
- The Astonished Heart – "A play in six scenes"
- Red Peppers – "An interlude with music"
- Hands Across the Sea – "A light comedy in one scene"
- Fumed Oak – "An unpleasant comedy in two scenes"
- Shadow Play – "A play with music"
- Family Album – "A Victorian comedy with music"
- Star Chamber – "A light comedy in one act"
- Ways and Means – "A comedy in three scenes"
- Still Life – "A play in five scenes"

=== Songs ===
Four of the plays in the cycle are musical. According to The New York Times, they "break into spontaneous song ... in the most unexpected places". The songs from Tonight at 8.30 are:

- "We Were Dancing", from We Were Dancing
- "Has Anybody Seen our Ship?" and "Men About Town" from Red Peppers
- "Then", "Play, Orchestra, Play" and "You Were There" from Shadow Play
- "Drinking Song", "Princes and Princesses", "Music Box" and "Hearts and Flowers" from Family Album.

== Productions ==
=== Original provincial production and tour ===
Six of the plays (We Were Dancing, The Astonished Heart, Red Peppers, Hands Across the Sea, Fumed Oak and Shadow Play) were first presented at the Opera House, Manchester, beginning on 15 October 1935. A seventh play, Family Album, was added on the subsequent nine-week provincial tour. (Note: The other tour dates were Leeds, Glasgow, Edinburgh, Liverpool, Newcastle and Birmingham.) The final three were added for the London run: Ways and Means, Still Life and Star Chamber, which was performed only once.

=== London and New York premieres ===
The first London performance was on 9 January 1936 at the Phoenix Theatre. Matinées were billed as To-day at 2.30. The first set of three plays presented comprised Family Album, The Astonished Heart and Red Peppers. Four days later the second trio was presented: Hands Across the Sea, Fumed Oak and Shadow Play. We Were Dancing was introduced on 29 January, and Ways and Means and Still Life were added in May. Star Chamber's only performance was on 21 March.

Partly to allow himself time to write, and partly because he hated acting in long runs, Coward's practice was to play for no more than six months in any run. The London production closed on 20 June 1936, after 157 performances. The American production opened in New York, after a try-out in Boston, on 24 November and played for 118 performances. The Broadway openings for the three parts were on 24, 27 and 30 November 1936, again starring Coward and Lawrence. (Note: Star Chamber was not included in the New York cycle.) Reviewing the Boston performances, James Thurber wrote:

It seems to me that all these plays were written wisely and well. (Mr Coward ... bats them off in no time at all, which appalls me.) They have, at their best, a precision that moves towards the absolute. … More decorous and self-contained than Boston folks, I did not rise and shout but applauded loudly … I liked it; hell, I was crazy about it: I had a swell time.

The New York run finished a month earlier than planned, because Coward's health broke down from overwork and his doctor insisted on an immediate break.

=== Revivals ===
The cycle was given in Canada in 1938 by an American touring company, led by Bramwell Fletcher. Major productions of parts of the cycle included Broadway revivals in 1948 (Red Peppers, Hands Across the Sea, Fumed Oak, Family Album, Shadow Play, and Ways and Means, starring Lawrence and Graham Payn), (Note: Payn was too unwell to appear at one performance and Coward went on for him; it was the last time he and Lawrence appeared on stage together.) and 1967 (Fumed Oak, Still Life and Ways and Means), 1981 at the Lyric Theatre in London (Shadow Play, Hands Across the Sea and Red Peppers), starring John Standing and Estelle Kohler and at the Chichester Festival in 2006 (Shadow Play, Hands Across the Sea, Red Peppers, Family Album, Fumed Oak and The Astonished Heart). In 1971, the Shaw Festival revived We Were Dancing, Family Album and Shadow Play, and in 2000, the Williamstown Theatre Festival revived We Were Dancing, Family Album, Hands Across the Sea (all starring Blythe Danner), Red Peppers, Shadow Play and Star Chamber. The Antaeus Company in Los Angeles revived all ten plays in October 2007, as did the Shaw Festival in 2009.

The first professional revival of the cycle in Britain was in April 2014, when English Touring Theatre staged all the plays except for Star Chamber. The critic Michael Billington wrote, "We are used to all-day stagings of Shakespeare. A marathon viewing of three Noel Coward triple bills, however, sounds like a banquet of soufflés. In the event, the nine plays … not only prove unexpectedly nourishing, but also reveal a lot about the author himself." The production, co-produced by the Nuffield Theatre, Southampton, opened there before a three-month national tour. In 2018 a revival played at Jermyn Street Theatre in London, directed by Tom Littler, omitting Fumed Oak but including Star Chamber. The cast included Sara Crowe, Ian Hallard and Rosemary Ashe.

== Adaptations ==
=== Cinema ===
Several films have been based on the plays. We Were Dancing was loosely adapted as a film of the same name in 1942, starring Norma Shearer and Melvyn Douglas. Coward adapted Still Life for the screen as Brief Encounter in 1945. The film was remade in 1974 starring Richard Burton and Sophia Loren. For a 1952 film, Meet Me Tonight (called Tonight at 8:30 in the US), directed by Anthony Pelissier, Coward adapted Ways and Means, Red Peppers and Fumed Oak. Coward played Christian Faber in a 1950 film of The Astonished Heart (also starring Celia Johnson and Margaret Leighton).

=== Television ===
Eight of the plays in the cycle (omitting Star Chamber and We Were Dancing) were adapted for television in 1991, by the BBC, starring Joan Collins. Television adaptations of Red Peppers were released in 1937, 1938, 1958 and 1969, the last starring Bruce Forsyth and Dora Bryan as the Peppers and Edith Evans as Mabel Grace. Still Life was given a television production in 1951. The NBC-TV anthology series Producers' Showcase debuted on 18 October 1954 with Shadow Play, Still Life and Red Peppers, produced and directed by Otto Preminger, starring Ginger Rogers in all three; Martyn Green also starred in Red Peppers. Hands Across the Sea was adapted for television in 1938.

== Notes, references and sources ==
=== Sources ===
- Coward, Noël (1954). Play Parade: The Collected Plays of Noël Coward, Volume 4. London: Heinemann. OCLC 660193185.
- Coward, Noël (1965). The Lyrics of Noël Coward. London: Heinemann. OCLC 249341883.
- Coward, Noël (2007). Barry Day (ed.). The Letters of Noël Coward. London: Methuen. ISBN 978-1-4081-0675-4.
- Day, Barry (2009). "Introduction". Tonight at 8.30. London: Bloomsbury Methuen. ISBN 978-1-4081-1345-5.
- Goble, Alan (2011) [1999]. The Complete Index to Literary Sources in Film. Berlin, Boston: De Gruyter Saur. ISBN 978-3-11-095194-3.
- Hoare, Philip (1995). Noël Coward, A Biography. London: Sinclair-Stevenson. ISBN 978-1-85619-265-1.
- Mander, Raymond; Joe Mitchenson (2000) [1957]. Theatrical Companion to Coward. Barry Day and Sheridan Morley (2000 edition, ed.) (second ed.). London: Oberon Books. ISBN 978-1-84002-054-0.
- Parker, John, ed. (1939). Who's Who in the Theatre (ninth ed.). London: Sir Isaac Pitman and Sons. OCLC 465772389.
