= Alan Webb (actor) =

English actor (1906–1982)

- Webb in Lease of Life (1954)
- Born: Alan Norton Fletcher Webb; 2 July 1906; York, England
- Died: 22 June 1982 (aged 75); Chichester, Sussex, England
- Occupation: Actor
- Years active: 1924–1982

Alan Norton Fletcher Webb (2 July 1906 – 22 June 1982) was an English actor. He was principally known as a stage performer, but made several film and television appearances. He seldom played leading roles, but was frequently cast in important character parts. He created roles in plays by A. A. Milne, Noël Coward, T. S. Eliot and other contemporary playwrights.

== Life and career ==
=== Early years ===
Webb was born in York on 2 July 1906, the elder of the two sons of Major Thomas Francis Albertoni Webb (1862–1955) and his wife Lili, née Fletcher. He was educated at Bramcote School, Scarborough, North Riding of Yorkshire and Royal Naval Colleges Osborne and Dartmouth. He decided against a Royal Navy career in favour of the theatre.

Webb made his first professional appearance on the stage at the Century Theatre, Bayswater in April 1924, as Lawyer Hawkins in The Devil's Disciple with the Lena Ashwell Players, with whom he remained until 1926. After shorter spells with J.B. Fagan's Oxford Players (1926–28) and the Masque Theatre Company in Edinburgh and Glasgow (1928) he had small roles in three West End productions. He then joined the Liverpool Repertory Company under the direction of William Armstrong. There, between 1929 and 1931 he was cast in leading roles, including Mole in the world premiere of Toad of Toad Hall, and Astrov to Armstrong's Uncle Vanya.

=== 1930s and 1940s ===
Webb's last spells in provincial repertory were with the Croydon Rep in 1932 and 1933, interspersed with three engagements in London. From the mid-1930s for several years he was in a relationship with Noël Coward; John Gielgud called Webb "[Coward's] best critic, in my opinion . . . a very caustic and brilliant actor, much under-rated. He was one of the few who dared to oppose Noël. Short, masculine, a little rough but definitely camp". Webb appeared in several of the author's plays. He had supporting roles in nine of the ten short plays in the Tonight at 8.30 cycle (1936), played Ernest in the British premiere of Design for Living (1939) and took over from Nicholas Phipps as Charles Condomine in Blithe Spirit (1945). In 1947, under the author's supervision, he directed the first production of Coward's Peace in Our Time. Long after their affair had finished, Coward cast him in the important role of Punalo Alani in South Sea Bubble in 1956.

Webb made his Broadway début in Tonight at 8.30 in 1936, and appeared again there the following year as Roger in Coward's production of Gerald Savory's comedy George and Margaret. During the Second World War he served in the armed forces. In the late 1940s, resuming his stage career, he acted and in the West End, on Broadway, and on tour in the US, the latter in Terence Rattigan's The Winslow Boy. He also directed.

=== Later years ===
In 1951 Webb played Polonius to the Hamlet of Alec Guinness at the New Theatre. The Times praised "the Polonius of Mr Alan Webb, always picking up in the thickening of senility the threads of his former astuteness and retaining a fair measure of his dignity", and The Tatler called Webb's performance "an adroit and amusing study of failing powers which occasionally find their former strength". At the Edinburgh Festival and on tour in the same year he played Henry Higgins in Pygmalion with Margaret Lockwood as Eliza.

Webb's other stage roles during the 1950s included Sir Timothy Bellboys in John Whiting's A Penny for a Song (London, 1951), William Collyer in Rattigan's The Deep Blue Sea (New York, 1952), Eggerson in T. S. Eliot's The Confidential Clerk (Edinburgh and London, 1952), Sir Toby Belch in Twelfth Night, the King of France in All's Well That Ends Well and Marcus Andronicus in Titus Andronicus (Shakespeare Memorial Theatre Company, Stratford-on-Avon, 1955), and three Shaw roles, Lord Summerhayes in Misalliance (Lyric, Hammersmith, 1956), Andrew Undershaft in Major Barbara (Royal Court, London, 1958) and Mazzini Dunn in Heartbreak House (1959, New York).

In the 1960s Webb appeared as Dudard in Eugène Ionesco's Rhinoceros, starring Laurence Olivier (Royal Court, 1960). With the Royal Shakespeare Company he played Gloucester in King Lear and Ernst Heinrich Ernesti in The Physicists. Later work included The Three Sisters at the Royal Court and Willy in Happy Days at the National Theatre in 1974.

=== Cinema and television ===
Webb made his film debut in Challenge to Lassie (1949), and went on to appear in such films as The Pumpkin Eater (1964), King Rat (1965); Chimes at Midnight (1965), The Taming of the Shrew (1967), Women in Love (1969), Entertaining Mr. Sloane (1970), The Canterbury Tales (1972) and The Duellists (1977).

He appeared several times on the BBC Play of the Month, Hallmark Hall of Fame and Play for Today, as well as popular television series Z-Cars, The Protectors, and Public Eye. In 1963, he was offered the role of the First Doctor in the BBC's new science fiction series Doctor Who but declined. Webb was also cast as Emperor Palpatine in Return of the Jedi but bowed out owing to illness.

Webb died at his home in Haslemere, Surrey, on 22 June 1982, aged 75.

== Screen and radio ==
=== Films ===
- Challenge to Lassie (1949) - James Brown
- The Astonished Heart (1950) - Sir Reginald
- The Cruel Sea (1953) - Admiral Murray-Forbes (uncredited)
- West of Zanzibar (1954) - Alan, Bob's Boss (uncredited)
- Lease of Life (1954) - Dr. Pembury
- The Night My Number Came Up (1955) - Governor (uncredited)
- The Silent Enemy (1958) - British Consul
- The Scapegoat (1959) - Inspector
- The Third Secret (1964) - Alden Hoving
- The Pumpkin Eater (1964) - Mr. Armitage - Jake's father
- King Rat (1965) - Brant
- Chimes at Midnight (1965) - Shallow
- The Taming of the Shrew (1967) - Gremio
- Interlude (1968) - Andrew
- Women in Love (1969) - Thomas Crich
- Entertaining Mr Sloane (1970) - Kemp ('Dadda')
- King Lear (1971) - Gloucester
- The Horsemen (1971) - Gardi Gay (uncredited)
- Nicholas and Alexandra (1971) - Yurovsky
- The Protectors (1972) - Blind Man
- The Canterbury Tales (1972) - Old Man
- The Duellists (1977) - Chevalier
- The First Great Train Robbery (1979) - Trent
- Rough Cut (1980) - Sir Samuel Sacks
- Deadly Game (1982) - Joseph Pillet (final film role)

=== Radio ===
Year	Programme	Episode/source
1952	Theatre Guild on the Air	The Pickwick Papers
1952	Theatre Guild on the Air	The Winslow Boy

== Sources ==
- Herbert, Ian, ed. (1977). Who's Who in the Theatre (sixteenth ed.). London and Detroit: Pitman Publishing and Gale Research. ISBN 978-0-273-00163-8.
- Hoare, Philip (1995). Noël Coward, A Biography. London: Sinclair-Stevenson. ISBN 978-1-4081-0675-4.
- Mander, Raymond; Joe Mitchenson (2000) [1957]. Theatrical Companion to Coward. Barry Day and Sheridan Morley (2000 edition, ed.) (second ed.). London: Oberon Books. ISBN 978-1-84002-054-0.
