= Joyce Carey =

English actress (1898–1993)

Joyce Carey OBE
- Carey as Myrtle in Brief Encounter, 1945
- Born: Joyce Lilian Lawrence; 30 March 1898; Kensington, London, England
- Died: 28 February 1993 (aged 94); Westminster, London, England
- Occupation: Actress
- Years active: 1916–1988
- Parent(s): Gerald Lawrence; Lilian Braithwaite

Joyce Carey (30 March 1898 – 28 February 1993) was an English actress, best known for her long professional and personal relationship with Noël Coward. Her stage career lasted from 1916 until 1987, and she was performing on television in her 90s. Although never a star, she was a familiar face both on stage and screen. In addition to light comedy, she had a large repertory of Shakespearean roles.

== Career ==
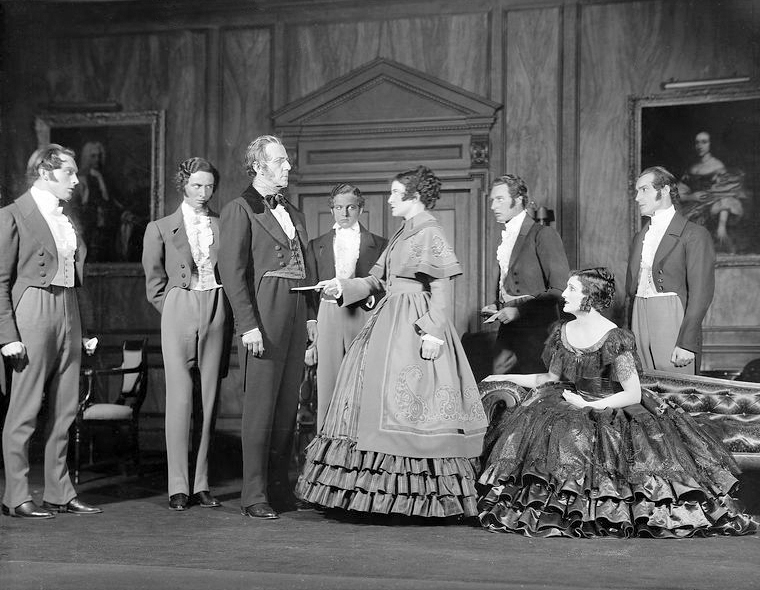
Joyce Carey (seated right) as Arabella Barrett in the original Broadway production of The Barretts of Wimpole Street (1931)

Joyce Carey was born Joyce Lilian Lawrence, the daughter of actor Gerald Lawrence, a matinée idol who had been a juvenile in Henry Irving's Shakespeare company, and his wife, actress Lilian Braithwaite, a major West End star. Carey was educated at the Florence Etlinger Dramatic School.

Carey made her stage debut in 1916, aged 18, as Princess Katherine in an all-female production of Henry V. She joined Sir George Alexander's company at the St James's Theatre playing Jacqueline, a French countess, in The Aristocrat. After a succession of West End roles in light comedy, Carey took on further Shakespearean parts, appearing at Stratford-upon-Avon as Anne Page, Perdita, Titania, Miranda and Juliet. Over the next few years she added Hermia, Celia and Olivia to her Shakespearean repertoire, in between regular appearances in West End comedies.

Her first appearance in a Noël Coward play was as Sarah Hurst in Easy Virtue in New York in 1926. For most of the following seven years, her career was chiefly in New York, following a great success in The Road to Rome in 1927. In 1932 she portrayed Emilia in the Broadway production of Lucrece. In 1934 she wrote (pseudonymously), and acted a supporting role in, a comedy, Sweet Aloes, which ran in London for more than a year. In 1936 she resumed her connection with Coward, playing a series of character roles in his cycle of short plays, Tonight at 8.30 in London and New York. In 1938 she starred in the comedy play Spring Meeting in the West End.

During the Second World War, Carey toured with John Gielgud for the Entertainments National Service Association (ENSA), recreating some of her roles from Tonight at 8.30. In 1942 she rejoined Coward to tour in his three newest plays, This Happy Breed as Sylvia, Blithe Spirit as Ruth, and Present Laughter as Liz – a character based partly on the actress herself. She later played all three roles in London. After the war she played in new Coward plays, Quadrille (with Alfred Lunt and Lynn Fontanne) and Nude with Violin (with Gielgud in London and Coward in New York).

The Times stated of her film work: "One role in a film written by Coward will remain always in the memory: with haughty disdain and an accent of fearful gentility Carey was the manageress of the station buffet in Brief Encounter, who froze her customers and slapped down attempts at familiarity from Stanley Holloway's ticket collector." Carey's other Coward film roles were the petty officer's wife in In Which We Serve and Mrs Bradman in Blithe Spirit. Her other films included The Way to the Stars and Cry the Beloved Country.

Between 1976 and 1979, Carey starred in the popular series The Cedar Tree. Her last stage performance was in 1984, as Mrs Higgins in Pygmalion, opposite Peter O'Toole; the critic Michael Coveney described her performance as plaintive and touching. She continued working on screen into her nineties, attracting enthusiastic notices for her portrayal of a frail old lady faced with eviction in Michael Palin's BBC play No 27.

== Critical opinion and personal life ==
The Times commented in its obituary of Carey:

Without ever becoming a big star, Joyce Carey was a graceful and distinctive actress whose performances consistently added lustre to the productions in which she appeared. Slight in build, with a wide-eyed and wistful face, she looked vulnerable and had a social poise that secured her many aristocratic roles among them Wilde's Lady Markby and the Hon. Gwendolen Fairfax. In private life her quiet, amusing personality endeared her to many people, notably Noel Coward and she became part of "the Master's" private world.

Carey was awarded the OBE in 1982. She never married: she enjoyed the enduring friendship of Coward's adopted "family". When Coward received his knighthood in 1970, Carey, along with the costume designer Gladys Calthrop, accompanied him to the ceremony at Buckingham Palace. She died in London, aged 94.

== Selected filmography ==
=== Film ===
- God and the Man (1918) as Priscilla Sefton
- Because (1918)
- Colonel Newcombe, the Perfect Gentleman (1920) as Rose
- In Which We Serve (1942) as Mrs. Hardy / Kath
- Blithe Spirit (1945) as Violet Bradman
- The Way to the Stars (1945) as Miss Winterton
- Brief Encounter (1945) as Myrtle Bagot
- The October Man (1947) as Mrs. Vinton
- London Belongs to Me (1948) as Mrs. Vizzard
- It's Hard to Be Good (1948) as Alice Beckett
- The Chiltern Hundreds (1949) as Lady Caroline
- The Astonished Heart (1950) as Susan Birch
- Happy Go Lovely (1951) as Bruno's Secretary
- Cry, the Beloved Country (1951) as Margaret Jarvis
- Street Corner (1953) as Miss Hopkins
- The End of the Affair (1955) as Miss Palmer
- Stolen Assignment (1955) as Ida Garnett
- Loser Takes All (1956) as Bird's Nest
- Alive and Kicking (1959) as Matron
- The Rough and the Smooth (1959) as Mrs. Thompson
- Libel (1959) as Miss Sykes
- Let's Get Married (1960) as Miss Finch
- Nearly a Nasty Accident (1961) as Lady Trowborough
- The Naked Edge (1961) as Victoria Hicks
- Greyfriars Bobby (1961) as First Lady
- The V.I.P.s (1963) as Mrs. Damer (uncredited)
- The Eyes of Annie Jones (1964) as Aunt Helen
- A Jolly Bad Fellow (1965) as Hotel Manageress
- A Nice Girl Like Me (1969) as Aunt Celia
- Lady Caroline Lamb (1972) as Marquise (uncredited)
- Father, Dear Father (1973) as Mother
- The Black Windmill (1974) as Miss Monley

=== Television ===
- Danger Man (1965) Season 2: Episode 15 as Lord Ammonford's wife
- Father, Dear Father (1968-1973, ITV) as Patrick's Mother
- The Secret Agent (1975, TV movie, BBC) as Lady Dorothy
- The New Avengers (1976, ITV) as Lady with Dog
- The Cedar Tree (1976–1979, ATV TV series) as Alice, Lady Bourne
- My Son, My Son (1979, BBC) as Mrs. Bendall
- Miss Marple - A Murder is Announced (1985, BBC) as Belle Goedler
- Number 27 (1988, TV movie, BBC) as Miss Barwick

== Sources ==
- Hoare, Philip. Noël Coward, A Biography. Sinclair-Stevenson 1995. ISBN 1-85619-265-2.
- Gaye, Freda (ed). Who's Who in the Theatre, Fourteenth edition. Pitman Publishing, London, 1967
- Lesley, Cole. The Life of Noël Coward. Cape 1976. ISBN 0-224-01288-6.
