= Design for Living =

1932 comedy play written by Noël Coward

Lunt, Coward and Fontanne in Design for Living

Design for Living is a comedy play written by Noël Coward in 1932. It concerns a trio of artistic characters, Gilda, Otto and Leo, and their complicated three-way relationship. Originally written to star Lynn Fontanne, Alfred Lunt and Coward, it was premiered on Broadway, partly because its risqué subject matter was thought unacceptable to the official censor in London. It was not until 1939 that a London production was presented.

Design for Living was a success on Broadway in 1933, but it has been revived less often than Coward's other major comedies. Coward said, "it was liked and disliked, and hated and admired, but never, I think, sufficiently loved by any but its three leading actors." The play was adapted into a film in 1933, directed by Ernst Lubitsch, with a screenplay by Ben Hecht, and starring Fredric March, Gary Cooper, and Miriam Hopkins. The play was first seen in London in 1939 and has enjoyed a number of stage revivals.

== Background and first production ==
Coward had known Alfred Lunt and Lynn Fontanne since his first trip to New York in 1921, when he was penniless and they were scarcely better off. Dreaming of future stardom, they resolved that when all three were famous Coward would write a play for them all to star in. In the following decade, Coward became one of the world's most famous playwrights, with a succession of popular hits. These ranged from the operetta Bitter Sweet (1929) and the extravaganza Cavalcade (1931), to the intimate comedies Hay Fever (1924) and Private Lives (1930). Lunt and Fontanne too had achieved fame, and by the early 1930s the time was right for Coward to write their star vehicle.

The Lunts' marriage was devoted and long-lived, but there were triangular relationships in their private lives which Coward could draw on for his plot. Coward recorded that while he was refining his original ideas for the play, "Alfred had suggested a few stage directions which if followed faithfully, would undoubtedly have landed all three of us in gaol". Of the three principal characters, Coward later commented,

These glib, over-articulate and amoral creatures force their lives into fantastic shapes and problems because they cannot help themselves. Impelled chiefly by the impact of their personalities each upon the other, they are like moths in a pool of light, unable to tolerate the lonely outer darkness but equally unable to share the light without colliding constantly and bruising each other's wings.... The ending of the play is equivocal. The three of them... are left together as the curtain falls, laughing.... Some saw it as the lascivious anticipation of a sort of a carnal frolic. Others with less ribald imaginations regarded it as a meaningless and slightly inept excuse to bring the curtain down. I as author, however, prefer to think that Gilda and Otto and Leo were laughing at themselves.

Design for Living previewed in Cleveland, Ohio on 2 January 1933 and opened in New York on 24 January, at the Ethel Barrymore Theatre on Broadway to popular and critical acclaim. In The New York Times, Brooks Atkinson described it as a play of "skill, art and clairvoyance, performed by an incomparable trio of comedians. ... Miss Fontanne with her slow, languorous deliberation, Mr Lunt with his boyish enthusiasm, Mr Coward with his biting, nervous clarity. ... Skill, art, even erudition of a sort have gone into this gay bit of drollery." The New York Sun called it "as happy a spectacle of surface skating as one might see," adding that the skaters were "sometimes on very thin ice." For the opening night, the price of tickets more than quintupled, and the three stars were reported to be receiving record salaries for a Broadway production.

Design for Living was such a success that Coward was prevailed upon to relax his usual rule against appearing in any production for more than three months, and he allowed the play to run for a total of five months. So great were the crowds of fans in the street that special police had to be called in during the last week of the run. The notoriety of the play inspired a Broadway parody, "Life Begins at 8:40", sung by Luella Gear, Ray Bolger and Bert Lahr:

Night and day, ma chérie,
Me for you, and you and you for me.
We're living in the smart upper sets.
Let other lovers sing their duets.
Duets are made for the bourgeoisie – oh
But only God can make a trio.

== Roles and original cast ==
- Gilda – Lynn Fontanne
- Ernest Friedman – Campbell Gullan
- Otto Sylvus – Alfred Lunt
- Leo Mercuré – Noël Coward
- Miss Hodge – Gladys Henson
- Photographer – Ward Bishop
- Mr Birbeck – Philip Tonge
- Grace Torrence – Ethel Borden
- Helen Carver – Phyllis Connard
- Henry Carver – Alan Campbell
- Matthew – Macleary Stinnett

== Plot ==
=== Act I ===
Otto's "rather shabby" studio in Paris, 1932

Gilda is an interior designer who lives with the painter Otto, who was previously attached to Leo, an author. She is visited by Ernest Friedman, an art dealer and friend of all three. He is excited about his newly acquired Matisse and wants to show it to Otto. Gilda says that Otto is in bed, ill, and cannot be disturbed. Ernest tells her that Leo is back in Paris after making a success in New York. Otto enters from the street, carrying luggage, and very clearly not bedridden as Gilda has told Ernest. Ernest prudently takes his leave. After he and Otto have gone out to find Leo, supposedly at the George V Hotel, Leo enters from Gilda's bedroom where he has spent the night with her. They discuss what they should say to Otto, whom they both love. On his return they tell him that they have slept together in his absence, and after a furious row he renounces both of them and storms out of the room.

=== Act II ===
Leo's flat in London eighteen months later

Scene 1

Leo and Gilda are now living together. His plays are now immensely successful. A journalist and press photographer call to do a feature on him. During the interview Leo makes several remarks that show how shallow he finds success.

Scene 2

A few days later, Leo is away, and Otto turns up. He too has now become successful. Otto and Gilda dine together and their old love is rekindled. They embrace passionately.

Scene 3

The next morning, Otto is still asleep when Ernest calls on Gilda. She tells him she is leaving Leo, and they exit together. Leo returns to discover Otto, who at once acknowledges that he has spent the night with Gilda. Before the ensuing row develops too far they spot the notes Gilda has left for them both. They are both horrified that she has gone, and they drown their sorrows in brandy and then sherry. They embrace, sobbing helplessly.

=== Act III ===
Ernest's penthouse in New York, two years later.

Scene 1

Gilda has married Ernest and become a commercially successful designer. Ernest is away, and Gilda is giving a reception for some important clients. It is gatecrashed by Otto and Leo, in impeccable evening dress, determined to reclaim her. They frighten her guests into leaving, and Gilda pretends to bid them goodnight along with her other guests, but secretly gives them a key and tells them to return later.

Scene 2

Ernest returns the next morning to find Otto and Leo in his apartment, wearing his pyjamas. Gilda, however, has not been there. She has been to a hotel overnight to allow herself time to think. When she returns, Otto and Leo explain to an incredulous and incandescent Ernest that Gilda's formal status as his wife is irrelevant. She slowly realises that the attraction the two exert for her is irresistible. As Ernest rushes out denouncing their "disgusting three-sided erotic hotch-potch," Gilda, Otto and Leo fall together on a sofa in gales of laughter.

== Revivals and adaptations ==
=== Theatre ===
The first London production of Design for Living opened at the Haymarket Theatre on 25 January 1939, later transferring to the Savoy Theatre, and running for 233 performances. The run was cut short by the outbreak of World War II. Gilda was played by Diana Wynyard, Otto by Anton Walbrook and Leo by Rex Harrison. By the time the play made its delayed debut in London Ivor Brown thought it "very much of its time and already seems a trifle faded. It will not be long before they revive it in costume as a specimen comedy of 'early thirties' manners."

The first major revival was at the Phoenix Theatre, London, shortly after Coward's death in 1973. Vanessa Redgrave played Gilda, with John Stride and Jeremy Brett as Otto and Leo. In 1982, at the Greenwich Theatre and then the Globe Theatre, Maria Aitken, Gary Bond and Ian Ogilvy played the lead roles.

The first Broadway revival was in 1984 at Circle in the Square Theater, directed by George C. Scott, starring Jill Clayburgh as Gilda, Raul Julia as Leo and Frank Langella as Otto.

A 1994 revival of the play directed by Sean Mathias at the Donmar Warehouse theatre emphasised the sexual overtones of the play. Though the Coward estate had been wary of radical reinterpretations of the plays, the author's partner, Graham Payn, attended at least one performance. The production featured Rachel Weisz, Paul Rhys and Clive Owen. It transferred to the West End with Weisz, Rupert Graves and Marcus D'Amico.

A 2001 Broadway revival, directed by Joe Mantello, starred Alan Cumming as Otto, Jennifer Ehle as Gilda and Dominic West as Leo. This version brought the gay subtext to the fore, and included a kiss between Otto and Leo.

In July 2002 Marianne Elliott directed a production for the Royal Exchange, Manchester with Victoria Scarborough as Gilda, Clarence Smith as Leo and Oliver Milburn as Otto. The Old Vic Theatre, London, staged a revival in 2010, with Tom Burke as Otto, Lisa Dillon as Gilda, and Andrew Scott as Leo.

=== Radio and television ===
As part of the ITV Play of the Week series in August 1964 four Coward plays directed and produced by Joan Kemp-Welch were transmitted, including Design for Living with Jill Bennett as Gilda, Daniel Massey as Leo, and John Wood as Otto.

A second television adaptation was broadcast by the BBC in its Play of the Month series in May 1979. Rula Lenska played Gilda with Clive Arrindell as Otto and John Steiner as Leo. The director was Philip Saville.

On BBC radio on 27 December 1976, Anna Massey played Gilda, with John Rye as Otto and Martin Jarvis as Leo.

=== Cinema ===
The play was adapted into a pre-Hays code comedy film in 1933, directed by Ernst Lubitsch, with a screenplay by Ben Hecht, starring Fredric March, Gary Cooper, Miriam Hopkins and Edward Everett Horton. Coward said of the film adaptation, "I'm told that there are three of my original lines left in the film – such original ones as 'Pass the mustard'." The film's plot was as follows:

In Paris, Americans, playwright Tom Chambers and artist George Curtis, both fall in love with Gilda, an American commercial artist. She cannot make up her mind which man she loves, so the three decide to live together platonically. At first, the three are friends, but as time goes by, the two men become more competitive. Gilda decides to end the dispute by marrying her employer, Max Plunkett, but finds the marriage dull and stifling. After Tom and George crash a party at the Plunkett mansion, Gilda returns to the two men, and Max agrees to a divorce.
