= Anthony Pelissier =

British actor, screenwriter, producer and director (1912–1988)

- Born: Harry Anthony Compton Pelissier; 27 July 1912; Chipping Barnet, Middlesex, England
- Died: 2 April 1988 (aged 75); Eastbourne, East Sussex, England
- Occupations: Actor; director; producer; screenwriter
- Spouses: Penelope Dudley-Ward (m. 1939; div. 1944): Margaret A Hyde (m. 1945; div. 19??); Monica Grey (m. 19??; div. 19??); Ursula Howells (m. 1968)
- Children: 4

Harry Anthony Compton Pelissier (27 July 1912 – 2 April 1988) was an English actor, screenwriter, producer and director.

== Biography ==
Pelissier was born in Barnet, north London, and came from a theatrical family. His parents were the theatre producer H. G. Pelissier (who presented Pelissier's Follies) and the actress Fay Compton. His uncle was Compton MacKenzie, who wrote Whisky Galore. He was barely a year old when his father died, and with his nineteen year-old widowed mother in pursuit of her acting career, was mostly raised by his grandmother Virginia Compton and a series of nannies. This background would inform one of his most successful films, The Rocking-Horse Winner with its plot of a neglected young boy desperate to please his worldly mother.

Pelissier began acting in the 1930s. In 1935 and 1936, he was featured in Noël Coward's play cycle, Tonight at 8.30, both in Britain and on Broadway. He also played in Coward's Set to Music (1939).That same year, in collaboration with his close friend, the actor John Mills he staged a West End revival of The Follies, the Edwardian musical revue company founded by his father H. G. Pélissier. He began writing in 1937 and directing in 1949. He was the screenwriter and director of four popular films: The History of Mr Polly (1949), The Rocking Horse Winner (1950), Night Without Stars (1951), and Personal Affair, starring Gene Tierney and written by Lesley Storm. He also directed Encore (1951).

He also directed Ealing's satire on television Meet Mr Lucifer (1953). He later headed the experimental production unit at the BBC.

== Personal life ==
Pelissier was married four times

- Penelope Dudley-Ward (m. 29 December 1939 – divorced 1944); the couple had one daughter, actress Tracy Reed (1942–2012)
- Margaret A Hyde (m. 1945), with whom he produced two daughters, Harriet (b. 1945) and Marie-Louise (b. 1949)
- Actress Monica Grey (m. in France) with whom he had one son, Joe Pelissier (b. 1963)
- Actress Ursula Howells (m. 1968 – 2 April 1988)

== Death ==
Pelissier died in Eastbourne, England, on 2 April 1988, aged 75. He was survived by his wife, Ursula Howells, and his four children.

== Selected filmography ==
- Perfect Strangers (1945, writer)
- The History of Mr Polly (1949, writer and director)
- The Rocking Horse Winner (1950, writer and director)
- Night Without Stars (1951, director)
- Encore (1951, director of "Winter Cruise" segment)
- Personal Affair (1953, director, credited as Anthony Pélissier)
- The Man Who Stroked Cats (1955, BBC TV film, director and co-writer)
