= Pomp and Circumstance (novel) =

1960 novel by Noel Coward

Pomp and Circumstance is Noël Coward's only novel. It was published in 1960, and in a lighthearted manner depicts events in a British island colony in the Pacific. Reviews were mixed: some critics, particularly in Britain (American reviews were generally more enthusiastic) thought Coward's narrative technique inferior to his stagecraft, but the novel has been reissued in paperback, braille and German translation as well as numerous hardback reprints.

The crux of the story is a forthcoming visit to the island by Queen Elizabeth II and Prince Philip and the resulting social wrangling that takes place among the British expatriates once the news of the imminent royal visit is known.

== Background ==
From the end of the Second World War in 1945 to the late 1950s Coward's critical reputation was at a low ebb. It later recovered in what he called "Dad's Renaissance" in the 1960s, but after Blithe Spirit (1941) – which played for a record-breaking 1,997 performances – his ten subsequent stage works – comedies, drama, musicals and revue – had markedly less successful runs. The longest, Nude with Violin (1956), was 511 performances and Relative Values (1951) ran for nearly as long, Quadrille managed 329 performances but the others averaged less than 200 performances each.

For his 1946 musical Pacific 1860 Coward had invented a Pacific island called Samolo, a British colony. He set a later play, South Sea Bubble, there and when he started work on a novel in 1958 he set it in the same location (although the action is set there a century later than in the musical).

== Plot ==
The narrator, Grizel Cragie, is the wife of an expatriate British banana planter on the island of Samolo, a British colony. She is practical and down-to-earth and manages her family of three children, her friends, and her domestic staff. She is a close friend and former wartime comrade of Lady Alexandra (Sandra) Shotter, wife of the governor of the colony. Their friend Bunny Colville is awaiting a visit from his lover, Eloise, the young and beautiful Duchess of Fowey, and for propriety's sake she cannot officially stay at his house. He asks Grizel to accommodate Eloise, and she agrees, not without misgivings.

A secret soon known to practically everybody on the island is that the Queen and Prince Philip are due to sail to Samolo within weeks for a three-day visit. Apart from the governor and his wife, Grizel is the first to hear the news:

"Can you imagine", cried Sandra tragically, "what's going to happen to all of us between now and June? Can you visualise the heart-burnings, the squabbles, the planning committees, the entertainment committees, the awful, degrading jockeyings for position that will go on? It will be a nightmare".

Sandra comments that there are on the island "one hundred and forty-three living breathing human egos each one of which is completely convinced that it is their right to be presented to Her Majesty the Queen". As the governor has been instructed that no more than fifty people are to be presented, this will leave ninety-three eminent inhabitants disgruntled.

In between the flag-waving and the round of cocktail parties, the island's residents cope with a variety of personal scandals, complicated by an outbreak of chicken-pox which thwarts Bunny's romance with Eloise – "He's got it very badly. He's running a high temperature and his chest looks like a bad Matisse".

Grizel is also involved in the island’s amateur dramatic association as it plans an elaborate aquatic pageant to be staged for the Queen and the Duke despite forecasts of squally weather soon to come (it is the middle of the island's rainy season). The other characters include native Samolans of high to low social position – the prime minister to the gardener – and expatriate characters from all walks of life. There is, as Grizel puts it, "a great deal of sex which goes on all the time with a winsome disregard of gender".

The novel ends as the Royal Navy ship carrying the Queen and the Duke is due to dock at the island's harbour, where the inhabitants:

waited with mounting excitement for the moment when two young and handsome people, crowned with the symbolic majesty of many centuries, would set foot for the first time upon their gay, gentle and enchanting island.

== Reception ==
The reviews of the novel in the British press were mixed. The Tatler thought the book "a mild and totally harmless joke" though conceding that it had "some daring moments with comic Lesbians and adultery foiled by chicken-pox". The reviewer concluded, "Better re-read Hay Fever, still one of the funniest comedies around and far less old-fashioned". The Liverpool Daily Post found the novel, "A slight, rather disappointing South Pacific romp … Wodehouse-and-water".

The Sphere thought the novel "wholly unpretentious and very, very funny". The Illustrated London News found the book:

a bright and witty piece … with just those touches of satire, serious comment on a social scene, and romance that have coloured his work (if such a Peter Pan will forgive the phrase!) for decades. … There is the Governor and his wife, with attendant officials; the planters who make up the bulk of the British colony; and the inevitable eccentrics – drunkards, queers, and the like – who find life on easy-going Samola happier than it would have been at home … And so the light-hearted comedy weaves its entrancing pattern. If you want to be soothed, intrigued, interested and amused all at the same time, do not fail to get this book.

American reviews were in general more enthusiastic. In The Chicago Tribune, Fanny Butcher wrote, "Among novels it belongs in the lighter than air class, and it has the zing and the bounce of a gay balloon in a high wind. It is Noel Coward at his jauntiest, his most deliciously satirical, and if you read it aloud you could fool any audience Into thinking they were at one of Coward's best comedies".

Another American reviewer, Helena L. Caperton, wrote, "When reading this first and delicious novel by Noel Coward and being shaken with laughter on every page, one constantly thinks to one's self, why, O why, didn't he write books like this long ago! We know he is a brilliant playwright and composer, now we know that he is a superlative novelist as well".

In The Boston Globe, Elizabeth Bernkopf wrote:

Nobody can do everything well. Nobody but Noel Coward, that is. After a lifetime in the theater as author, actor, producer, song writer, he now comes along with his first novel. And, as usual, he lands immediately at the top with those incredibly nimble feet. […] The book is a suave, sophisticated delight from beginning to end. This behind-the-scenes peek at British pageantry is Noel Coward at his best in the genre in which he is supreme.

== Editions ==
The novel was published in Britain by Heinemann and in the US by Doubleday both in 1960. Pan Books issued a paperback edition in the same year. Also in 1960, a German translation was published as Palmen, Pomp und Paukenschlag by Wunderlich in Tübingen. A braille edition was published in 1964. More recent reissues have come from Dutton in New York and Methuen in London.

== Sources ==
- Coward, Noël (1960). Pomp and Circumstance. London: Heinemann. OCLC 916796785.
- Gaye, Freda, ed. (1967). Who's Who in the Theatre (fourteenth ed.). London: Sir Isaac Pitman and Sons. OCLC 5997224.
- Lesley, Cole (1976). The Life of Noël Coward. London: Cape. ISBN 978-0-224-01288-1.
- Mander, Raymond; Joe Mitchenson (1957). Theatrical Companion to Coward (first ed.). London: Rockliffe. OCLC 1336174067.
