= Gladys Calthrop =

Calthrop's set and costumes for Conversation Piece (1934)

Gladys Edith Mabel Calthrop (née Treeby; 29 March 1894 – 7 March 1980) was an artist and leading British stage designer. She is best known as the set and costume designer for many of Noël Coward's plays and musicals.

== Early life ==
Gladys Edith Mabel Treeby was born in Ashton, Devon, the daughter of Mabel and Frederick Theophilus Treeby. She was educated at Grassendale School, Bournemouth. Her parents sent her to a finishing school in Paris, and she returned married to Army captain Everard E. Calthrop, from Norfolk. The couple had a son, Hugo, whose care Calthrop entrusted mostly to her mother. He was later killed in the Burma Campaign. She was soon separated from her husband (she had lesbian relationships thereafter) and studied art at Slade School of Fine Art.

== Career ==
Calthrop was introduced to Noël Coward by Mrs. Astley Cooper while on holiday in Italy in 1921. She soon became a close friend of Coward's, and she commenced her theatre career in November 1924 with her design for his The Vortex, staged at the Everyman Theatre in Hampstead. As she later recalled: "It was the first play I had ever designed so I was terribly excited, though there was nowhere to paint the sets except outside the theatre in Hampstead High Street, and the costumes all had to be made in a kind of basement there."

She stayed in New York after travelling there for the Broadway production of The Vortex, becoming Artistic Director for Eva la Galliene's Civic Repertory Theatre, for whom she directed John Gabriel Borkman on Broadway in 1926. Her designs for Broadway included The Cradle Song (1927), This Year of Grace (1928), Bitter Sweet (1929), Autumn Crocus (1932), Private Lives (1931), Design for Living (1933), Conversation Piece (1934), Point Valaine (1935), Tonight at 8.30 (1936), Excursion (1937), Dear Octopus (1939) and Set to Music (1939).

In 1929, Calthrop had an affair with Mercedes de Acosta, who wrote an unpublished book of 20 poems for her, possibly after they broke up, with a dedication: “To Gladys, take these frail poems, for the sake of many things. Your eyes – these years – a dream, and some golden moments fleet with wings.” The book was rediscovered in 2024.

Calthrop continued to work as a designer in Britain until 1964. She also designed some films, including four Coward adaptations, in the 1940s. In 1940 she published her first and only novel, Paper Pattern.

During World War II, she served in the Mechanised Transport Corps. She also illustrated the Noël Coward Song Book (1953). She died at the age of 85.

== Archives ==
Calthrop's papers, including her letters, are held at the Cadbury Research Library, University of Birmingham. The V&A holds 195 of her designs.

The National Portrait Gallery in London holds 16 photographs of Calthrop in its collections, and the University of Bristol Theatre Collection holds a portrait of her by Clemence Dane and a bust by Fiore de Henriquez.

== Stage works ==
The dates given are for the West End productions unless otherwise specified:

- The Vortex (Everyman, Hampstead); Dick Whittington (1924)
- Spring Cleaning; On With the Dance; Easy Virtue; Hay Fever (1925)
- The Queen Was in the Parlour (1926)
- Home Chat; Sirocco; The Cradle Song (Broadway) (1927)
- This Year of Grace (revue); Come With Me (1928)
- The Cradle Song; The Master Builder; Bitter Sweet (Broadway); The Black Ace (1929)
- Private Lives; Autumn Crocus; Bitter Sweet, Cavalcade (1931)
- Words and Music (1932)
- Three Sisters; Design for Living (Broadway) (1933)
- Conversation Piece (1934)
- Point Valaine (Broadway) (1935)
- Mademoiselle; Tonight at 8.30 (Broadway) (1936)
- Excursion (Broadway); You Can't Take it With You (1937)
- Operette; Jack and the Beanstalk (1938)
- All Clear; Dear Octopus (Broadway); Set to Music (Broadway) (1939)
- Cousin Muriel (1940)
- No Time for Comedy; Blithe Spirit (1941)
- Present Laughter; This Happy Breed (1943)
- The Gay Pavilion (1945)
- Pacific 1860 (1946)
- Present Laughter; Peace In Our Time (1947)
- Ace of Clubs (1950)
- The Vortex (1952)
- The Edwardians (1959)
- The Bröntes (recital, 1964)

== Filmography ==
- In Which We Serve (1942)
- This Happy Breed (1944)
- Brief Encounter; Blithe Spirit (1945)
- The Fighting O'Flynn (1949)
- The Astonished Heart (1950)
