= Relative Values =

Relative Values may refer to:

- Relative Values (film), a 2000 British comedy film adaptation of the 1950s play of the same name by Noël Coward
- Relative Values (play), a three-act comedy by Noël Coward
- "Relative Values" (Doctors), a 2004 television episode
- "Relative Values" (The Good Guys), a 1992 television episode
