= Una Venning =

English actress (1893–1985)

Venning with James Carew in The Queen's Champion, 1914

Una Venning (12 November 1893 – 9 March 1985), née Una Vane Baumgartner, was an English actress who had a long career on stage and in broadcasting.

She made her stage début before the First World War and continued to appear in productions into the 1960s. She was little engaged in cinema, making only a handful of films, but was a familiar voice on BBC Radio and appeared on television in plays by authors ranging from Shakespeare to Wilde, Shaw, Barrie and Maugham. One of her last stage parts was in Noël Coward's late play Waiting in the Wings (1960), in which she created the role of a retired actress.

== Life and career ==
=== Early years ===
Una Venning was born in Bedford on 12 November 1893, the fourth child and only daughter of Harry Percy Baumgartner and his wife, Ethel, née Vane. She was educated at Bedford and then at Kensington High School. She studied for the stage at the Royal Academy of Dramatic Art and made her first professional appearance at the Theatre Royal, Ipswich, in 1911 as Viola Hood in the comedy-drama The Flag Lieutenant. She subsequently toured in Milestones as the Hon Muriel Pym, a role created in the West End by Gladys Cooper. Venning sailed to the US in 1912 to play the same part. Also in the US cast was Malcolm Cherry, whom Venning married five years later.

On returning to England, Venning toured with Rutland Barrington in the comedy The Gilded Pill in the role of Kitty Tyson, created in London by Laura Cowie. One reviewer wrote, "Miss Una Venning is extremely sympathetic as Kitty Tyson, and is obviously an actress of good training, and, moreover, of much personal charm". She made her first appearance in London in January 1914 at the Aldwych Theatre, playing the Queen of Dalitza in The Queen's Champion, winning favourable notices in papers including The Morning Post, The Pall Mall Gazette, The Academy and The Observer.

At Wyndham's Theatre in September 1914 she played Nally in Outcast. The following year she played one of her few cinema roles, appearing with Cherry in a cast that also included Edith Evans, in A Welsh Singer. At the Court in March 1916 she took the role of Erica Krauss in Kultur at Home, a satire of life in a small Prussian town. She then left the stage for four years. In 1917 Cherry divorced his first wife for adultery, and he and Venning married in the same year. They had a daughter, Deborah Joan, born in August 1918.

=== 1920s and 1930s ===
In 1920 Venning toured the camp theatres for the Navy and Army Canteen Board. She returned to the West End stage in January 1921, playing the Neighbour in Maurice Maeterlinck's The Betrothal at the Gaiety Theatre. Her other roles of the first half of the decade began in three successive productions with Gerald du Maurier at Wyndham's: Miss Pringle in The Dancers (February 1923), Lady Symster in Not in Our Stars (February 1924) and Ethel Holt in To Have the Honour (April 1924). After these she played Emma in The Swallow (Everyman, May 1925), and Lady Evelyn Lynwood in The Price of Silence (Gaiety, Dublin, August 1925). Cherry died in 1926; Venning subsequently married the director Gordon Hamilton Gay, who died in 1973.

At the St James's Theatre, London, in September 1926, Venning succeeded Mabel Sealby as the Hon Mrs Wynton in The Last of Mrs Cheyney and later in the run she took over from Cooper as Mrs Cheyney. At the Everyman in April 1927 she played Sylvia Dugmore in Common People, before touring with Cooper, Robert Newton and Tristan Rawson the following year in Somerset Maugham's The Letter. Her last role of the 1920s was Mrs Harris in Fame, directed by and starring du Maurier at the St James's in February 1929.

Still at the St James's, in June 1930 Venning played Countess Erdelyi in The Swan after which she went to New York, and at the Shubert Theatre in September 1930 she played Porter in Ivor Novello's comedy Symphony in Two Flats, in a cast that included Novello, Benita Hume, Lilian Braithwaite and Ann Trevor. During 1932 and into 1933 she was engaged at the Playhouse, London, as understudy to Cooper; in September 1933, she succeeded Martita Hunt as Lady Strawholme in Novello's farce Fresh Fields at the Criterion. After this she did two further spells understudying leading roles: at the Queen's in December 1933 she understudied Marie Tempest in The Old Folks at Home, and in October 1934 she was understudy to both Tempest and Madge Titheradge in Theatre Royal, at the Lyric.

Venning's roles during the remainder of the 1930s were Miss Kent in Hervey House at His Majesty's in May, 1935; Peacock in Short Story at the Queen's in November 1935; and Edna Randolph in Dodie Smith's Dear Octopus at the Queen's in September 1938 in a cast that included Tempest, John Gielgud, Kate Cutler and Angela Baddeley.

=== Later years ===
In July 1940 H. M. Tennent revived Dear Octopus, presented this time at the Adelphi. Tempest and Venning from the original 1938 production were joined by Joyce Carey, Hugh Sinclair and the young Leslie Phillips in one of his first West End appearances. Venning's only other stage role during the Second World War years was Esme Bellingham in The Nutmeg Tree at the Lyric in October 1941. After that she was engaged in war work until 1945.

Venning reappeared on the stage at the New in July 1945 as Cornelia Knight in The First Gentleman, which starred Robert Morley as the Prince Regent and Wendy Hiller as Princess Charlotte. Her other roles of the later 1940s were Mrs Beauclerc in Corinth House (New Lindsey, May 1948), Hera and Queen Elizabeth in These Mortals (People's Palace, November 1948), and Emily Raynor in Night Was Our Friend (Intimate Theatre, October 1949).

In 1950 Venning made one of her few film appearances, as Miss Pigeon in Portrait of Clare. Who's Who in the Theatre records eleven stage roles she played during the 1950s: Jasmine in Tyrone Guthrie's Top of the Ladder (St James's,1950); Lady Sophia Spratte in Maugham's Loaves and Fishes (New Bolton 1951); Lady McGuffie in Lords of Creation (Vaudeville 1952); Mrs Maitland in Pagan In the Parlour (on tour, 1952); the Duchess of Hampshire in Gossip Column (Q Theatre 1953); Lady Meggleton in All Night Sitting (on tour, 1954); Mme Fosco in The Lovers (Q, 1954); Grace Smith in A Question of Fact (Theatre Royal, Windsor, 1954); Mrs Chillingworth in Love Affair {Alexandra, Birmingham, 1955); and Mrs Cross in The Silver Whistle (Duchess), 1956. From November 1957 to April 1959 she was a member of the BBC Drama Repertory Company.

Venning's penultimate stage role was Cora Clarke in Noël Coward's Waiting in the Wings (Duke of York's, September 1960). Her character, like those of Sybil Thorndyke, Marie Lohr, Nora Nicholson and others, was a former actress living in a theatrical retirement home. (Note: Because of the machinations of Binkie Beaumont, head of Coward's producers, H. M. Tennent, Venning was deprived of a final opportunity to appear with Gladys Cooper in this play. Cooper asked Coward why he had written a play about retired actresses without a part for her and he explained that he had written it for her but Beaumont had – falsely – told him that she had turned it down.) During the pre-London tour a Manchester critic praised the first three and then Venning, "who has some of the funniest lines in the play and makes full use of them". Her final stage role was in Ira Levin's comedy Critic's Choice given at the Vaudeville in December 1961. Her characterisation of her part, Charlotte Orr, was "nicely acid as a mother-in-law", according to The Stage. Her last cinema role was Mrs Cromer in Hide and Seek, filmed in 1962 and released in 1964.

Venning died at the age of 91 on 9 March 1985. The obituarist in The Times praised "her poise and gift of evoking sympathy … Tall, deep-voiced, and utterly reliable". The paper described her as a pioneer of television drama – she appeared in plays by authors ranging from Shakespeare to Oscar Wilde, Bernard Shaw, J. M. Barrie and Somerset Maugham – and a frequent radio broadcaster.

== Notes, references and sources ==
=== Sources ===
- Gaye, Freda, ed. (1967). Who's Who in the Theatre (fourteenth ed.). London: Sir Isaac Pitman and Sons. OCLC 5997224.
- Hoare, Philip (1995). Noël Coward, A Biography. London: Sinclair-Stevenson. ISBN 978-1-4081-0675-4.
- Low, Rachael (1950). The History of the British Film 1914–1918. London: George Allen & Unwin. OCLC 1454980836.
- Parker, John, ed. (1922). Who's Who in the Theatre (fourth ed.). London: Sir Isaac Pitman and Sons. OCLC 10013276.
- Speed, F. Maurice (1950). Film Review 1950. London: Macdonald. OCLC 911948497.
