= Nude with Violin =

Play by Noël Coward

John Gielgud as Sebastien and Joyce Carey as Isobel, 1956

Nude with Violin is a play in three acts (later revised into two acts) by Noël Coward. A light comedy of manners, the play is a satire on "Modern Art", criticism, artistic pretension and the value placed on art. It is set in Paris in 1956 and portrays the effect on the family and associates of a famous artist when it is revealed after his death that he painted none of the pictures signed by him and sold for large sums. The action is mostly under the discreet control of the artist's valet, Sebastien, who manipulates events to bring about a happy ending for all the characters.

Its original London production, opening on 7 November 1956, was successful, running for more than a year, starring, successively, John Gielgud, Michael Wilding and Robert Helpmann. Coward played the lead role in the Broadway production in 1957. The play has rarely been professionally revived.

== Background ==
After the Second World War Coward strove with mixed success to regain his pre-war popularity. His 1945 revue Sigh No More had run for only 213 performances in the West End, and the failure of his musical Pacific 1860 in 1946–47 was in contrast to the success of the show that followed it at Drury Lane, Rodgers and Hammerstein's Oklahoma!, which ran for more than ten times as long. (Note: Pacific 1860 ran for 129 performances; Oklahoma! ran for 1,543 performances, the second-longest West End run for a musical to that date, second only to Chu Chin Chow.) Of Coward's subsequent London productions, only Relative Values had been a firm success at the box office (477 performances in 1951–1953). Quadrille (1952–53) ran for just under a year, and three other shows had shorter runs. (Note: Ace of Clubs (1950) ran for 211 performances, After the Ball (1954) for 188, and South Sea Bubble (1956), which was still running when Nude with Violin opened, ran for a total of 276.)

Coward had become a tax exile earlier in 1956, and was not allowed by the British authorities to re-enter the country before April 1957. So that he could see his new play the pre-London tour began outside the UK – in Dublin. When Coward arrived there from the US in time for the second performance, he cut and revised parts of the script. He was credited as co-director with John Gielgud, who also played the lead role, Sebastian.

== West End and Broadway premieres ==
After a tour beginning at the Olympia Theatre, Dublin, on 24 September 1956, where it played for two weeks, (Note: The pre-London tour then took in Liverpool, Manchester, Newcastle upon Tyne and Edinburgh.) Nude with Violin opened in London on 8 November 1956 at the Globe Theatre (now called the Gielgud Theatre). It ran until 1 February 1958, a total of 511 performances. During the London run Gielgud was succeeded, as Sebastien, first by Michael Wilding and then by Robert Helpmann.

After a pre-Broadway tour, (Note: The tour dates were Wilmington, Delaware (one week), and Philadelphia (two weeks).) a production opened at the Belasco Theatre on Broadway in November 1957, starring the author as Sebastien. It ran there for a limited season of 86 performances. Coward then presented and starred in the play in San Francisco and Los Angeles, in repertory with his 1939 comedy Present Laughter.

== Characters and original casts ==
Role	London	New York
Sebastien	John Gielgud (Note: Michael Wilding (24 June to 21 November 1957); Robert Helpmann (23 November 1957 to 1 February 1958).)	Noël Coward
Marie-Celeste	Gillian Webb	Thérèse Quadri
Clinton Preminger Jr	John Sterland (Note: Peter Sallis played the role in Dublin.)	William Traylor
Isobel Sorodin	Joyce Carey (Note: Succeeded by Zena Dare from September 1957.)	Joyce Carey
Jane (her daughter)	Ann Castle	Angela Thornton
Colin (her son)	Basil Henson	John Ainsworth
Pamela (Colin's wife)	Patricia Rayne	Iola Lynn
Jacob Friedland	David Horne (Note: Succeeded by Geoffrey Dunn from September 1957.)	Morris Carnovsky
Anya Pavlikov	Patience Collier	Luba Malina
Cherry-May Waterton	Kathleen Harrison	Mona Washbourne
Fabrice	Douglas Robinson	Robert Thurston
Obadiah Lewellyn	Thomas Baptiste	Cory Devlin
George (a press photographer)	Keith Green (Note: John Sterland played the role in Dublin.)	Robert Wark
Lauderdale (a schoolboy)	Nicky Edmett	Bobby Alford

Source: Theatrical Companion to Coward.

== Synopsis ==
The play was originally in three acts, with one scene in the first and two in the second and third. By the time of the London opening Coward had regrouped it into two acts, of two and three scenes. The play is set throughout in the studio of the late Paul Sorodin, in Paris in 1954. The studio is large and luxuriously furnished, but shows no evidence of Sorodin's own work.

=== Act 1 ===
The famous artist Paul Sorodin has died. In the studio his valet, Sebastien Lacréole, and maid, Marie-Celeste, are awaiting the family's return from the funeral. A young American reporter, Clinton Preminger Jr, talks his way in, hoping for an interview with the artist's widow, Isobel. She returns, accompanied by her son Colin, daughter-in-law Pamela and daughter Jane. Isobel and Sorodin had been estranged, and Jane hardly knew her father but has inherited his sense of humour and kindness. The family is joined by Jacob Friedland, an art dealer who has for many years handled Sorodin's pictures and looked after his financial affairs. They eject Clinton.

Sebastien pours champagne and proposes a toast to his former employer – "a man who ... contrived to enjoy life to the full, and at the same time remain a hero to his own valet". Jane asks Jacob about her father's work. He explains that it was concentrated into three great periods: the "Farouche", dating from 1927 into the early 1930s; the "Circular", from 1933 to 1939; and the post-war or "Jamaican" period.

Jane insists to her family that, since Sorodin died intestate and Isobel will inherit his large fortune, it is only right to make provision for the faithful Sebastien. Isobel is persuaded to offer Sebastien the choice of a small pension or a cash lump sum. He politely declines both and tells the family and Jacob that he has been entrusted by his late master with a letter, now safely lodged in a bank. He reads them a copy of the letter in which Sorodin states that, with the exception of a watercolour of a dog painted when he was a child, he never painted a picture of any kind throughout his life.

=== Act 2, Scene 1 ===
A few hours later.
The Sorodins and Jacob discuss the position as they dejectedly sit at the dining table. They decide that they must find the "ghost" artist who painted the pictures. Isobel wants to buy his silence, but Jane and Jacob argue that whoever painted the pictures should be given credit for them. Sebastien tells them that in the bank, along with the original of the letter, there is the key to a studio in a Parisian suburb in which there is one final "Sorodin" masterpiece, "Nude with Violin".

The doorbell rings and Clinton rushes in. He has learnt about the picture from a telegram from America: Elmore P. Riskin, director of the Manhattan Museum of Modern Art, is flying over to buy it. Clinton asks to see it, but Sebastien pretends that it is being varnished. They promise to telephone Clinton when it is ready, and he leaves. After his departure Anya Pavlikov is announced. She is, it emerges, a Russian princess, a former lover of Sorodin's, who painted all the pictures from the "Farouche" period. Although she has promised, and been handsomely paid, not to reveal the secret, she attempts to blackmail the family by threatening to publish Sorodin's letter to her in which he acknowledges the fraud and offers her hush-money. Sebastien happens to have sufficiently embarrassing information about Anya to counter her attempt at blackmail, and she departs in a fury.

=== Act 2, Scene 2 ===
Five in the afternoon, the following day.
Sebastien is pestered by Clinton for information about Sorodin but finally gets rid of him. He telephones Jacob Friedland to tell him that Anya is returning with Sorodin's incriminating letter, which she will hand over for a price.

Jane is distressed to learn that her father was a fake, but Sebastien assures her that Sorodin was an idealist with "a fanatical, burning hatred of dishonesty", a crusader who loved good art and loathed "the cant, intellectual snobbism and commercialising of creative talent". He perpetrated his deceptions to defy other art critics and dealers, including Jacob.

Cherry-May Waterton, a blowsy, cheerful, middle-aged blonde, enters accompanied by her boyfriend, Fabrice. Cherry-May, another of Sorodin's former lovers, was, it emerges, the painter of his "Circular" style pictures. She too has brought a copy of a document incriminating Sorodin and hints that her claims may be settled by the purchase of a chicken farm for Fabrice. Colin Sorodin becomes truculent and Fabrice knocks him down. The brawl is abruptly halted by Marie-Celeste's announcement of Obadiah Llewellyn, an impeccable West Indian, holding a document in his hand. "My God!" exclaims Sebastien, "The Jamaican period!"

=== Act 3, Scene 1 ===
A few hours later.
Jacob is in an adjoining room talking to Obadiah, and the family are awaiting the outcome of that discussion. When Jacob returns he reports that Obadiah is not bribable: he is a Seventh Day Adventist and has religious scruples about his deception, feeling that, to save Sorodin's soul, he must publish the truth. Sebastien suggests that, if all else fails, he has a shady friend who would be willing and able to abstract the relevant document from Obadiah's pocket.

Cherry-May returns; Jacob agrees to provide the funds for her boyfriend's chicken farm and dispatches her to Biarritz to retrieve the original document. When all the visitors have left, Sebastien sends the frantic Jacob home to bed, telephones his underworld friend and asks him to come round: "No knives or firearms necessary, but you might slip a cosh in your pocket in case of unforeseen developments".

=== Act 3, Scene 2 ===
Next morning
Clinton has called with a press photographer to take a picture of "Nude with Violin". He is ecstatic, but the photographer, George, is obviously unimpressed, and the family, when they appear, are reduced to helpless laughter by what they see as a dreadful painting. Jacob is shocked by their philistinism, but Sebastien cheers him up by reporting that Obadiah is on his way back to Jamaica. No theft has been necessary: Sebastien and his underworld friends staged a revivalist meeting and persuaded Obadiah to destroy the document as an act of faith. As compensation, Obadiah has been satisfied with £50 for a stained-glass window in his church.

The appalling quality of "Nude with Violin" makes Jane suspect that Sebastien painted it – initiating a fourth period in Sorodin's fictitious output, "Neo-infantilism". He firmly denies it. It emerges that the painter was Sebastien's son, the young Lauderdale, and that there are more of his paintings in storage, all signed by Sorodin, which he can sell to collectors at a vast profit. Jacob is appalled at the deception and threatens to expose it. Sebastien points out that Jacob's own finances and professional reputation would be destroyed by such a revelation. The family agree, and the curtain falls as Sebastien is about to usher in Elmore P. Riskin and his English counterpart, Sir Alaric Craigie. (Note: In the original version, played in Dublin, the curtain rose again to show Lauderdale at work in the empty studio, industriously adding the final touches to "Nude with Violin ", but the effect was anticlimactic, and the tableau was cut after a few performances.)

== Revivals ==
Helpmann led the cast in a tour of Australia after the play closed in London in 1958, and also in a televised version broadcast in the UK in 1959. The televised version featured Hermione Baddeley as Cherry-May and Patience Collier reprising her stage role as Anya. A later television version aired in 1964 in Melbourne, starring Terry Norris.

In Coward's centenary year, 1999, the play was mounted at the Royal Exchange, Manchester, starring Derek Griffiths as Sebastien, Marcia Warren as Isobel, Tamzin Malleson as Jane, and Nick Caldecott as Clinton; Marianne Elliott directed.

In 2017 Lesya Ukrainka National Academic Theater in Kyiv staged the play in Ukrainian, in a translation by O. Atlas and A. Vasilieva, directed by Leonid Ostropolsky.

== Critical reaction ==
Coward later recalled the reviews as hostile, saying the play "received almost unanimous abuse from the critics and ran to capacity for 18 months". The reviews were in fact polite though not laudatory. The Manchester Guardian called the play "good entertainment" but felt that Coward's subject, hypocrisy about modern art, was stale. The Observer's reviewer, Kenneth Tynan, said that the play "recalls those triumphant Letters to the Editor which end: 'What has this so-called "Picasso" got that my six-year-old daughter hasn't?'" He continued:

When Sir John Gielgud appears in modern dress on the London stage for only the second time since the late nineteen-forties, selecting as his vehicle Noël Coward's Nude with Violin, one's expectations are naturally low. Sir John never acts seriously in modern dress; it is the lounging attire in which he relaxes between classical bookings, and his present performance as a simpering valet is an act of boyish mischief, carried out with extreme elegance and the general aspect of a tight, smart, walking umbrella."

The Times liked the idea of a celebrated painter who turns out never to have painted anything, but found it "apparently incapable of developments ... Mr Coward can only proceed to play variations on it. Some of them are cosily amusing but ... the author is left in the end trying rather desperately to lure us into the belief that the perpetrator of the monstrous 'Nude with Violin' is the artful valet himself." In The Daily Telegraph, W. A. Darlington said that the play followed two earlier comedies about artistic fraud, Arnold Bennett's The Great Adventure and A. A. Milne's The Truth About Blayds, and, like them, had "a brilliant opening, followed by a gradual tailing off to an unsatisfactory finish". Darlington concluded that the climax, at the end of the first act, when the imposture is revealed, leaves the playwright with nothing to portray but other people's reactions to it, "And, somehow, that doesn't make an exciting story". Coward said he came to recognise that there was some truth in this criticism when he played the lead on Broadway.

Reviewing the 1999 revival, Jeffrey Wainwright wrote in The Independent, "As a satire on modern art the play is laboured and unoriginal, but its real subject is the relationship between the valet and his absent hero." Like the critics in The Times and Telegraph he found that the narrative flagged in later scenes: "Having created his situation, Coward appears to have been content with the repetitious sport provided by the sequential arrival of the true 'artists'".

== Notes, references and sources ==
=== Sources ===
- Coward, Noël (1958). Nude with Violin. New York: Doubleday. OCLC 2232216.
- Hoare, Philip (1995). Noël Coward, A Biography. London: Sinclair-Stevenson. ISBN 978-1-4081-0675-4.
- Lahr, John (1982). Coward the Playwright. London: Methuen. ISBN 978-0-413-48050-7.
- Lesley, Cole (1976). The Life of Noël Coward. London: Cape. ISBN 978-0-224-01288-1.
- Mander, Raymond; Mitchenson, Joe; Day, Barry Day; Morley, Sheridan (2000) [1957]. Theatrical Companion to Coward (second ed.). London: Oberon. ISBN 978-1-84002-054-0.
