= Waiting in the Wings (play) =

1960 play by Noël Coward

Graham Payn, Sybil Thorndike, Mary Clare in Act I

Waiting in the Wings is a play by Noël Coward. Set in a retirement home for actresses, it focuses on a feud between two residents, Lotta Bainbridge and May Davenport, who once both loved the same man.

== Background ==
Waiting in the Wings was Coward's fiftieth play. It premiered in Dublin on 8 August 1960 at the Olympia Theatre, and in the West End at the Duke of York's Theatre on 7 September 1960. It was directed by Margaret Webster and starred Sybil Thorndike, Lewis Casson, Marie Lohr and Graham Payn.

Binkie Beaumont, who usually presented Coward's plays in London, turned it down as "old fashioned". Michael Redgrave put together "a starry cast led by... an amazing gathering of old actresses, many of whom had been stars when Noel was just starting out." Coward later wrote that in the pre-London tour to Dublin, Liverpool and Manchester the play was received "with heart-warming enthusiasm by both the public and the critics." The play was enthusiastically received by the public at its London opening. The London critics, however, disliked the play, and – which was in Coward's eyes much worse – the mass-circulation papers "had neither the wit nor the generosity to pay sufficient tribute to the acting... they gave to their wide circulation of readers the wholly inaccurate impression that the play had been a failure from every point of view." Ultimately, Waiting in the Wings was not a financial success. Coward said of the play:

I wrote Waiting in the Wings with loving care and absolute belief in its characters. I consider that the reconciliation between "Lotta" and "May" in Act Two Scene Three, and the meeting of Lotta and her son in Act Three Scene Two, are two of the best scenes I have ever written. I consider that the play as a whole contains, beneath the froth of some of its lighter moments, the basic truth that old age needn't be nearly so dreary and sad as it is supposed to be, provided you greet it with humour and live it with courage.

Four decades later, the play opened on Broadway at the Walter Kerr Theatre on 16 December 1999, transferred to the Eugene O'Neill Theatre on 17 February 2000, and closed on 28 May 2000 after 186 performances and 16 previews. The production was directed by Michael Langham and revised by Jeremy Sams.

== Roles and original cast ==
- May Davenport – Marie Lohr
- Cora Clarke – Una Venning
- Bonita Belgrave – Maidie Andrews
- Maudie Melrose – Norah Blaney
- Deirdre O’Malley – Maureen Delany
- Almina Clare – Mary Clare
- Estelle Craven – Edith Day
- Perry Lascoe – Graham Payn
- Miss Archie – Margot Boyd
- Osgood Meeker – Lewis Casson
- Lotta Bainbridge – Sybil Thorndike
- Dora – Betty Hare
- Doreen – Jean Conroy
- Sarita Myrtle – Nora Nicholson
- Zelda Fenwick – Jessica Dunning
- Doctor Jevons – Eric Hillyard
- Alan Bennet – William Hutt
- Topsy Baskerville – Molly Lumley

== Synopsis ==
The action of the play takes place in "The Wings" charity home for retired actresses. The Time is the Present.

=== Act I ===
- Scene I. A Sunday afternoon in June

The residents of the home discuss a forthcoming charity event for the home, at which a younger generation of stars will perform to raise funds. They are hoping that the funds will allow the home to build a solarium. The other residents break it to May Davenport that her old adversary Lotta Bainbridge will shortly come to live at The Wings. May, furious, vows never to speak to Lotta and retreats to her room. Lotta arrives with her maid Dora. Dora is about to be married and will no longer be able to look after Lotta. They part, sadly, and Lotta is left alone.

- Scene II. Three a.m. on a Monday morning. A month later

A group of the residents returns from watching the dress rehearsal for the fund-raising show. They do not think the new generation of performers are up to the standards of their own heyday. Lotta attempts to overcome May's hostility but is rebuffed.

=== Act II ===
- Scene I. A Sunday afternoon in September

Perry, the secretary to the charity that runs The Wings, has invited Zelda, a journalist friend, to visit the home. Miss Archie, the superintendent of The Wings, warns him that this will lead to trouble, but he is prepared to risk it for the valuable publicity he expects to attract for the home. The first resident that Zelda encounters is Sarita, whose wits are wandering and who thinks she is still a leading actress. Other residents, unaware that Zelda is from the press, make indiscreetly rude remarks about the charity committee that runs the home. Lotta recognises Zelda and tries to get her to promise not to write about The Wings.

- Scene II. Several hours later

Sarita accidentally sets fire to her room. Disaster is averted by prompt action by the other residents. In the crisis, May gives a slight hint of rapprochement with Lotta. They slowly become friendly and drink a toast to each other.

- Scene III. A week later

Zelda has written about the home in her newspaper. Lotta is amused, and May is annoyed, by the story, "Old foes still feuding in the twilight of their lives." Perry comes in. He was sacked for introducing a journalist to The Wings, but he has been reinstated because May has privately prevailed on the committee to excuse him. Sarita, still in a state of serene oblivion to reality, is taken away to be cared for in a mental hospital.

=== Act III ===
- Scene I. The evening of Christmas Day

Zelda turns up with a large cheque from the proprietor of her paper, to be donated to The Wings. She also presents a case of vintage champagne for the residents. During the ensuing celebrations, Deirdre, one of the residents, drops dead.

- Scene II. A Sunday afternoon in June

May and Lotta engage in friendly banter. A visitor, Lotta's son, arrives. His father was Lotta's first husband before her falling out with May. He tries to persuade Lotta to leave The Wings and come to live with him and his wife and children in Canada, but she refuses. The latest new resident is introduced; she was once a music-hall star and the other residents all welcome her by singing her most famous song.

== Critical reaction ==
The Broadway version of the play fared a little better with the critics than the original production had, earning mixed reviews. Curtain Up commented: "Good as they are the Wings residents can't transform Waiting in the Wings into the first-rate play it never was (the English production was a flop which persuaded Coward's long-time companion and biographer Graham Payn to retire from the stage)." However, the critic John Simon wrote: "A seemingly inconsequential piece... the play is a wise and compassionate address of the problems of aging and death that confront us all." Sheridan Morley wrote, "the play has moments of near-Chekhovian dignity and melancholy, and insights into the process of ageing for people who have made careers out of youth".

Sybil Thorndike, who played Lotta, later said, "I loved that play. It's the most lovely modern play I've played.... Mind you, it had that same cruelty that The Vortex had. My scene with my son was a very cruel scene really, but awfully funny".

== Awards and nominations ==
=== Original Broadway production ===
Year	Award	Category	Nominee	Result
2000	Tony Award	Best Actress in a Play	Rosemary Harris	Nominated
2000	Tony Award	Best Featured Actress in a Play	Helen Stenborg	Nominated
