= Maidie Andrews =

English actress and singer (1893–1986)

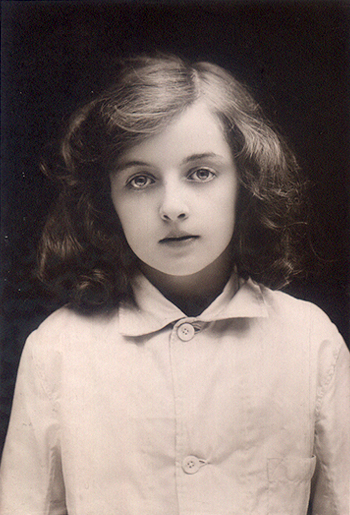
- Andrews aged 10 in The Climbers (1903) - photograph by Lizzie Caswall Smith
- Born: Maidie Andrews; 27 September 1893; Camden Town, London, England
- Died: 13 October 1986 (aged 93); Kensington, London, England
- Occupations: Actress, singer
- Years active: 1903–1966
- Relatives: Robert Andrews (brother)

Maidie Andrews (27 September 1893 – 13 October 1986) was an English actress and singer who, with a career that spanned six decades, was a child actress and later a stage beauty who appeared in musical comedy including the original London productions of No, No, Nanette (1925) and Cavalcade (1931). The latter years of her career saw her taking roles in television and film.

== Early life ==
Maidie Andrews was born in Camden Town in London in 1893, the only daughter and second eldest of four children of Ada Harriet née Judd (1873–1946) and Walter Andrews (1861–1935), variously a furniture remover, a horse-drawn omnibus inspector and a refreshment attendant. Her younger brother Robert Andrews, born as Reginald Frank Andrews (1895–1976), was also a British child actor and later a stage and film actor. He is perhaps best known as the long-term partner of Ivor Novello.

== Child star ==
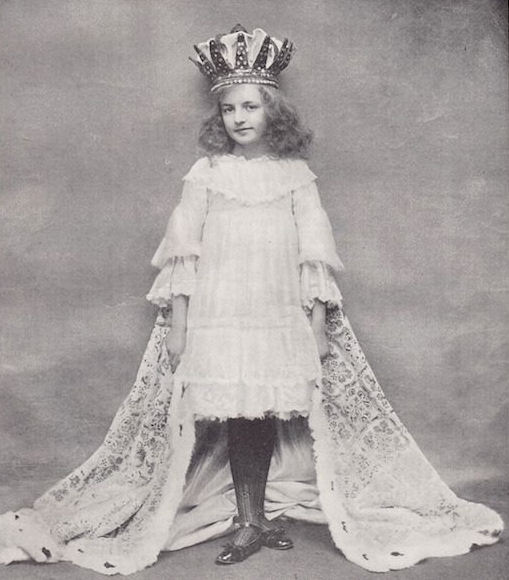
Andrews as Alice in Alice in Wonderland - The Tatler (January 1904)

A theatrical child star, she made her professional stage debut shortly before her 10th birthday as Master Sterling in The Climbers at the Comedy Theatre in September 1903, playing Alice in Alice in Wonderland at the same theatre during the Christmas period 1903–04. Of her performance as Alice the critic of Lloyd's Weekly Newspaper wrote, 'Mr. John Donald, the manager, is fortunate in having secured for the artless Alice such a winsome little actress as Miss Maidie Andrews, who evokes interest for all she says and does.'

She was Cissie, one of the Babes in the pantomime Babes in the Wood opposite Phyllis Dare as Charley at the Theatre Royal, Birmingham (1904–05), while in July 1905 she was Little Joan in Where the Crows Gathered at the Criterion Theatre. Early 1907, saw her touring as the Second Twin in Peter Pan; or, the Boy Who Wouldn't Grow Up opposite Zena Dare. She reprised the role of Alice in the children's musical Alice in Wonderland (1907–08) opposite Alice Barth as the Duchess and the Red Queen at the Apollo Theatre in London. She toured as the First Twin in the 1909-10 tour of Peter Pan opposite Pauline Chase as Peter. In February 1910, she appeared as Mrs Darling and First Twin in Peter Pan at the Duke of York's Theatre opposite Herbert Hollom, the first male Peter Pan.

== Stage career ==
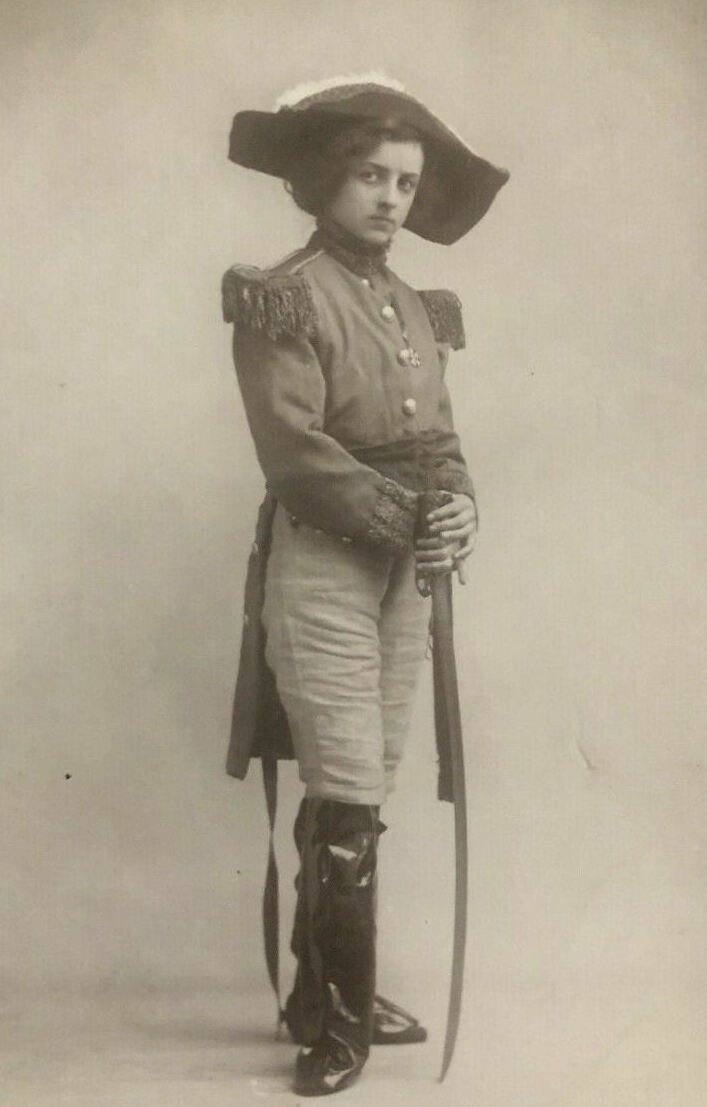
As the Second Twin in Peter Pan; or, the Boy Who Wouldn't Grow Up (1907)

She was in the national tour of the operetta The Count of Luxembourg (1911–1912) including at the Prince's Theatre, Bristol; was in the national tour of Arnold Bennett's play Milestones (1912–1913); was Joan in Yes, Uncle! (1919) at the Shaftesbury Theatre, and was in the national tour of the musical comedy The Cousin From Nowhere (1922–1923).

She was Sue Smith in the original London production of No, No, Nanette (1925) opposite Binnie Hale and George Grossmith Jr. at the Palace Theatre in London and reprised her role as Sue Smith in the 1936 revival opposite Shaun Glenville at the London Hippodrome. In 1925 she was Charlotte in The Three Graces, an English-language adaptation of Lehár's Der Libellentanz, while 1928 saw Andrews in the musical comedy That's A Good Girl starring Jack Buchanan and Elsie Randolph, and was Rose darling in the original production of Noël Coward's Cavalcade (1931) at the Theatre Royal, Drury Lane. Andrews played the maid Rose in the original West End production of Coward's musical play Conversation Piece (1934) opposite Coward and Yvonne Printemps at His Majesty's Theatre and afterwards at the 44th Street Theatre on Broadway, and was the La Marquise De Sauriole in the original Broadway production of Coward's musical revue Set to Music (1939) at the Music Box Theatre. She was Nancy Collister in Cole Porter's musical Let's Face It! (1943) opposite Noele Gordon and Bobby Howes at the London Hippodrome, and was in Arc de Triomphe (1943–1944) at the Phoenix Theatre in London.

Maidie Andrews (left), Marie Lohr, Sybil Thorndike and Maureen Delany (right) rehearsing for Waiting in the Wings at the Duke of York's Theatre, 6 September 1960

She was Mrs Stirling in Noël Coward's musical Pacific 1860 (1946) opposite Mary Martin and Graham Payn. It was the first show to play at the Theatre Royal, Drury Lane after World War II. She played the drama teacher Monica Stevens in Ivor Novello's last musical Gay's the Word (1950–51) opposite Cicely Courtneidge and Thorley Walters at the Saville Theatre in London.

Andrews was La Toulouse in the musical Wedding in Paris (1954) opposite Anton Walbrook and Evelyn Laye at the London Hippodrome. In 1959 she played Brigette Blair in a national tour of the farcical comedy Fool's Paradise, again opposite Courtneidge. She was Bonita Belgrave in the original production of Noël Coward's Waiting in the Wings opposite Sybil Thorndike and Marie Lohr and a cast of elderly actresses which premiered in Dublin on 8 August 1960 at the Olympia Theatre, and in the West End at the Duke of York's Theatre on 7 September 1960 before going on a national tour.

== Television and film ==
As the Christening Lady in A Night to Remember (1958)

Her television appearances included ITV Play of the Week (1956); Ivor Novello (1956), a BBC docudrama about the life of Ivor Novello; in the series Sunday's Child (1959); Gilbert and Sullivan: The Immortal Jesters (1961), and Florrie Martin in the episode Sing Me the Old Song of the police series No Hiding Place (1966). She was Miss Trebelly in the film Symphony in Two Flats (1930) opposite Ivor Novello.

== Later life ==
In 1939, she was living with her widowed mother Ada Harriet Andrews at Littlewick Green at Cookham in Berkshire. In 1950, she was living there with her youngest brother Cyril Walter Andrews.

Maidie Andrews spent her last years living in the family home of 37 St Mary's Mansions, St Mary's Terrace in Kensington. She died in 1986 at age 93. In her will, her estate was valued at £158,260. She never married.
