= Virginia Mathews =

American literacy advocate and author (1925–2011)

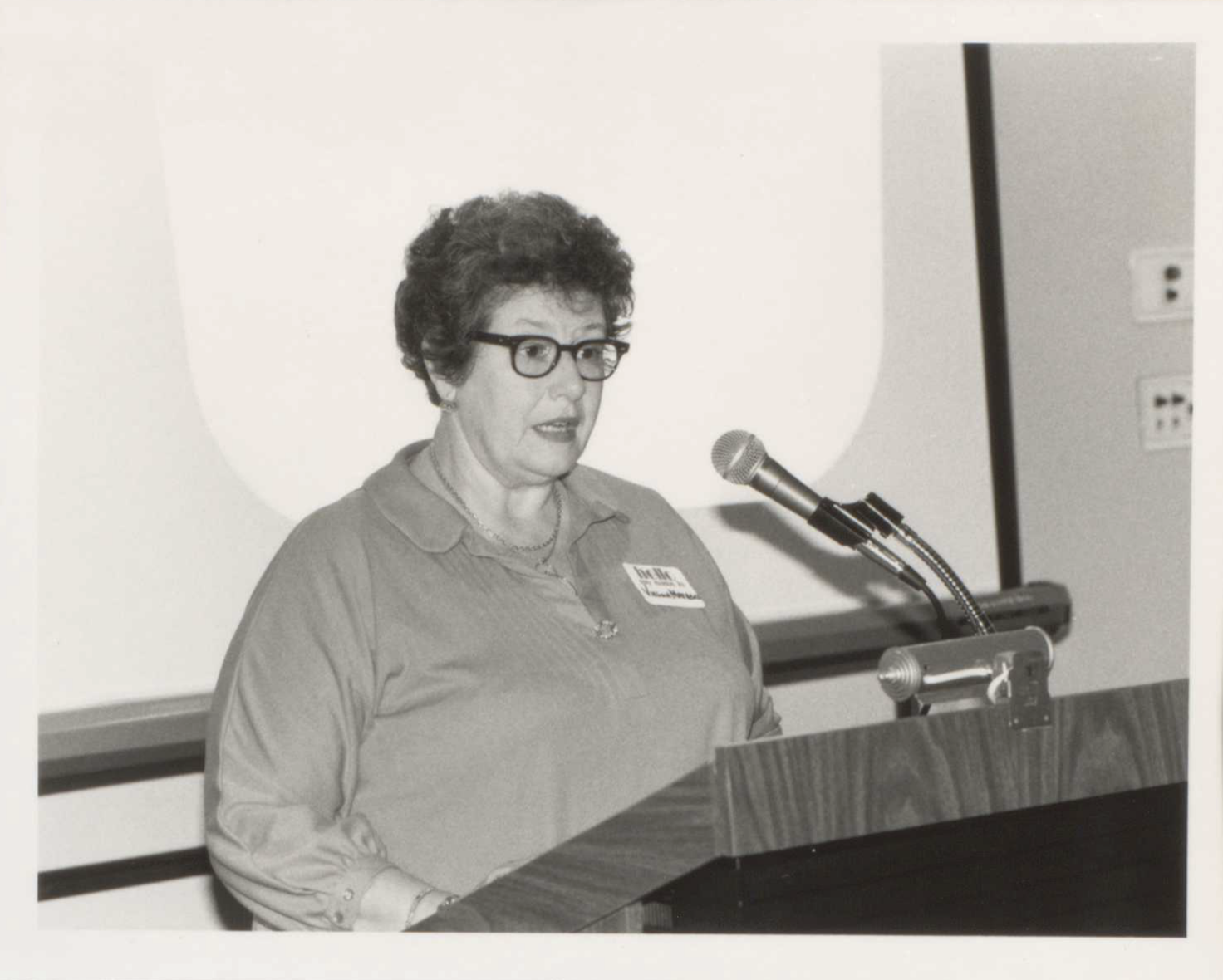
- Mathews in 1978
- Born: Virginia Hopper Mathews; March 9, 1925; New York City, New York, U.S.
- Died: May 7, 2011 (aged 86); Central Pennsylvania, U.S.
- Resting place: Machpelah Presbyterian Cemetery
- Citizenship: Osage Nation; American
- Occupations: Writer; librarian
- Father: John Joseph Mathews
- Relatives: John Hopper Mathews (brother)

Virginia Winslow Hopper Mathews (March 9, 1925 – May 7, 2011) was a literacy advocate and author. Mathews, the daughter of American Indian author John Joseph Mathews, co-founded the American Indian Library Association (AILA). She also helped develop Sesame Street while serving as a consultant to Children's Television Workshop, and she promoted activities to support literacy through libraries

== Early life and education ==
Virginian H. Mathews was born on March 9, 1925, the first child of John Joseph Mathews and Virginia Winslow Hopper, in Manhattan. Her younger brother John Hopper Mathews was born in August the next year. John Joseph left the family in 1928. Virginia did not see her father again until February 1939. In the 1950s, they reconnected and grew closer.

Matthews was a member of the Osage Nation. Mathews graduated from the Beard School (now Morristown-Beard School) in Orange, NJ in 1942. After high school, she took college courses at Goucher College, the University of Geneva, and Columbia University. In 2004, Morristown-Beard School awarded Mathews their Distinguished Alumni Award.

== Career ==
Mathews wrote reviews of children's books for The New York Herald Tribune and The New York Times. She also served as Deputy Director and then Director of the National Book Committee. The committee selected the National Book Awards and promoted public literacy during a 14-year period (1957 to 1974). Mathews's work with the National Book Committee to promote reading also helped created National Library Week. The Library of Congress now houses Mathews papers from her time working at the National Book Committee.

After leaving the National Book Committee, Mathews worked for the Center for the Book at the Library of Congress.

She then worked with the National Commission on Libraries and Information Science to organize the 1979 and 1991 White House Conferences on Library and Information Services as well as the Preconference on Indian Library & Information Services.She was responsible for the inclusion of Title IV for Indian libraries into the LSCA Reauthorization, 1984. She also assessed the impact of the conferences in 2004.

Mathews also helped develop the American Library Association's collaborations with Head Start. She was a founder of the American Indian Library Association.

During the 1960s, Mathews created the children's TV series Reading Out Loud with Westinghouse Broadcasting executive Mike Santangelo. Produced by Westinghouse for syndication, the show featured notable figures reading aloud their favorite books to children. It debuted in February 1960 on the five TV stations owned by Westinghouse in Baltimore, Boston, Cleveland, Pittsburgh, and San Francisco. Reading Out Loud also opened on WNTA-TV (now WNET-TV) in New York City and 46 educational TV stations around the U.S. It ran as a half-hour show for 15 episodes. Reading Out Loud featured guest appearances by:

- First Lady Eleanor Roosevelt (reading Just So Stories by Rudyard Kipling)
- Actress Julie Harris (reading The Wind in the Willows)
- Actor José Ferrer (reading Huckleberry Finn)
- Baseball player Jackie Robinson (reading The Red Badge of Courage)
- Entertainer Gary Moore (reading The Legend of Sleepy Hollow)
- Novelist Pearl S. Buck (reading Chinese fables)
- Actor Cyril Ritchard (reading Alice in Wonderland)
- Singer Harry Belafonte (reading a folk tale about the spider Anansi)
- Senator John F. Kennedy (reading The Emergence of Lincoln)

== Personal life and death ==
Mathews was a lesbian and lived with her longtime partner, Virginia "Ginny" B. Huie (1920–2008). Her mother's sister, Phyllis Hopper, was also a lesbian and had dated Ginny before Mathews. Mathews died on May 7, 2011, in Central Pennsylvania and was buried in the Machpelah Presbyterian Cemetery next to Ginny.

== Honors and legacy ==
In 1965, the Women's National Book Association awarded Mathews the WNBA Book Award. The American Indian Library Association awarded Mathews their Distinguished Service to Indian Libraries Award in 1993.

In 1994 Mathews was awarded American Library Association Honorary Membership.

The Association for Library Service to Children awarded Mathews a Distinguished Service Award in 1995.

In 2012, the American Indian Library Association named its library school scholarship after her.

Mathews' papers relating to her work as director, National Book Committee, Deputy Director, National Library Week, and consultant, Library of Congress Center for the Book are at the Library of Congress.

== Selected publications ==
- Lacy, Dan Mabry; Mathews, Virginia H. (1969). Social change and the library, 1945-1980. Washington, D.C.: United States Department of Health, Education, and Welfare, Office of Education.
- Mathews, Virginia H.; Lacy, Dan (1970). Response to change: American libraries in the seventies, Issues 1-7. Indiana State Library.
- Mathews, Virginia H. (1975). Continuing Adult Education and Indian Libraries. National Indian Education Association.
- Mathews, Virginia H. (1978). Libraries for Today and Tomorrow: How Do We Pay for Them? Who Uses Them? Who Staffs Them? What are Their Services?. Doubleday. ISBN 0385055641.
- Libraries, Aids to Life Satisfaction for Older Women: A 1981 White House Conference on the Aging Background Paper (1981)
- The Parent and Child Services Program: a 1995 sourcebook on parent and child projects (1995)
- Mathews, Virginia H. (1996). Kids Can't Wait -- Library Advocacy Now!: A President's Paper. Chicago: American Library Association.
- Mathews, Virginia H. (2004). Libraries, Citizens & Advocacy: The Lasting Effects of Two White House Conferences on Library and Information Services. Center for the Book, Library of Congress / White House Conference on Library and Information Services Taskforce.

== Works cited ==
- Snyder, Michael (2017). John Joseph Mathews: Life of an Osage Writer. Norman: University of Oklahoma Press. ISBN 978-0-8061-5609-5.
