= John Hopper Mathews =

- Born: August 3, 1926; Los Angeles, California, U.S.
- Died: February 2, 2015 (aged 88)
- Citizenship: Osage Nation; American
- Occupations: actor, research scientist, professor
- Father: John Joseph Mathews
- Relatives: Virginia Mathews (sister); Sidney Painter (father-in-law)

John Hopper Mathews (August 3, 1926 – February 2, 2015) was an American and Osage Nation actor, professor, and research scientist.

Mathews was born in Los Angeles and shortly after his father, John Joseph Mathews, left the family. He moved with his mother, Virginia Hopper, and older sister, Virginia Mathews, to New York City where he worked as a radio actor, broadway actor, and church choir singer to help support the family.

Mathews later attended the U.S. Naval Academy, ETH Zurich, and the University of Michigan before starting a career as a military research scientist. After retiring from civil service he taught at Bowie State College.

== Early life and acting ==
John Hopper Mathews was born on August 3, 1926, to John Joseph Mathews and his first wife Virginia Winslow Hopper in Los Angeles, California. He's the younger brother of Virginia Mathews and a member of the Osage Nation. In September 1928, John left his wife and children. The family later moved to New York. During the 1930s he worked as a professional radio and broadway actor and as a choir boy to help support the family since John provided little financial support. He sang at the Church of the Heavenly Rest, played a bit part in Set to Music (1939) on Broadway, and appeared in multiple episodes of The March of Time. He also acted in radio, voicing characters on Raising Your Parents (1936-1937) and The Rich Kid (1937-1938). While John and his father would speak later in his life, they were never close.

== Education and research ==
Mathews attended the United States Naval Academy Preparatory School and later studied engineering at the U.S. Naval Academy, graduating in 1950. He continued to act while in college in school productions. He attended the ETH Zurich. He then attended the University of Michigan in 1959 and earned a master's degree in physics. In 1962, he moved to Bowie, Maryland to work as a research scientist for the United States. He worked for the Naval Research Laboratory, the Pentagon, the United States Army, and United States Air Force. Some of his research was published in Nature.

After retiring from civil service, he taught at Bowie State College and worked for Travelling Tutors.

== Personal life and death ==
Mathews met his wife, Mary Abigail "Gail" Painter, in 1949 and they married on July 27, 1951. She was the daughter of Sidney Painter. They had three children. He died on February 2, 2015.

== Works cited ==
- Snyder, Michael (2017). John Joseph Mathews: Life of an Osage Writer. Norman: University of Oklahoma Press. ISBN 978-0-8061-5609-5.
