= Sylvia Cecil =

English singer and actress (c.1898–1983)

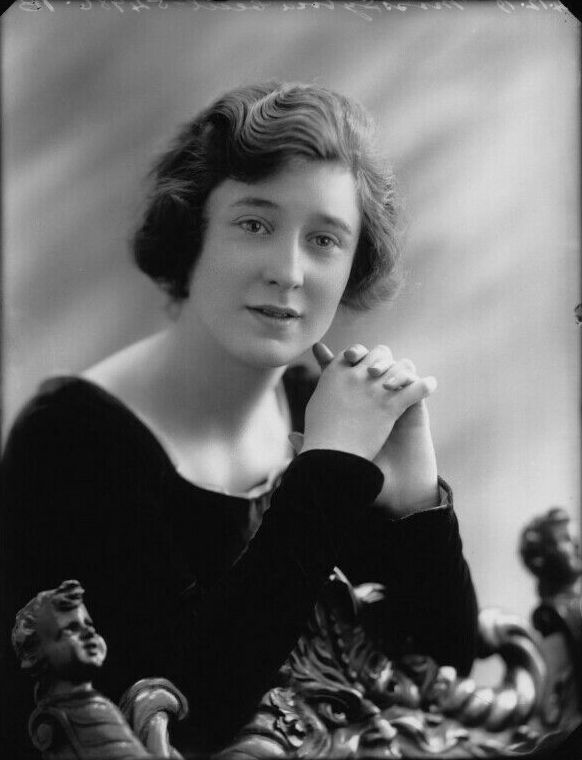
Cecil circa 1920

Sylvia Cecil (c. 1898 (Note: No birth record is found under this name. A "Lilian Sylvia Cecil" was born in the Holborn Registration District, Middlesex, Greater London, in the first Quarter of 1898: see GRO 1b/660. In the 1911 census, a Sylvia Cecil of Holborn, aged 13, is indexed as LIYHCIA. Parents are shown as William (a fishmonger) and Emma. In her entry in Who's Who in the Theatre Cecil gave her date of birth as 27 December 1906.) – c. 1983) was an English singer and actress. She began her career in the Gilbert and Sullivan operas with the D'Oyly Carte Opera Company, with whom she performed, off and on, from 1918 until 1937. She also performed in musical theatre, concerts, music hall and variety from 1921, and broadcast on radio. In the 1940s and 1950s she starred in several musicals by Ivor Novello and Noël Coward.

== Biography ==
Cecil was born in London. She was educated at St Clement Danes Grammar School, Holborn, and then studied for the stage with Clive Currie and at the Guildhall School of Music. She made her stage debut in 1914 playing Titania in a youth production of A Midsummer Night's Dream. During the following year she played Silvius in As You Like It and Helena in A Midsummer Night's Dream.

=== Early career ===
Cecil with Henry Lytton in The Yeomen of the Guard

In 1918, Cecil was engaged by the D'Oyly Carte Opera Company to play the leading role of the Plaintiff in Trial by Jury, as well as the smaller roles of the Lady Ella in Patience, Peep-Bo in The Mikado and Fiametta in The Gondoliers. In 1919 she added the principal soprano roles of Patience in Patience, the title role in Princess Ida (recreating that role for the company's first London revival of the opera in 1919), Yum-Yum in The Mikado, Elsie Maynard in The Yeomen of the Guard and Casilda in The Gondoliers. In 1920, she added to her repertory the role of Rose Maybud in Ruddigore, recreating the role when the opera was revived for the first time in Glasgow and then in London. Critics from The Observer praised Cecil for her performances as Patience, Princess Ida and Elsie, but Neville Cardus in The Manchester Guardian thought her Yum-Yum, "not quite in the right key.... She sang rather finely but her song at the beginning of Act II does not ask for a full-blown concert method." Another critic of the same paper thought her voice "a little light" for Patience, but added that "she has gaiety and charm, and that is much."

Cecil left the D'Oyly Carte Opera Company in 1921 and began to perform in musical comedy. In 1922 she played Paula in Angel Face by Victor Herbert. Cardus said of her performance in Katja the Dancer, that the piece "will not lose friends in Manchester with Miss Sylvia Cecil in the cast; it will be considered a virtue in her manner that at times it is not unlike the manner of Miss José Collins." In 1928, she played Flora Campbell in Blue Eyes at the then-new Piccadilly Theatre. She rejoined the D'Oyly Carte Opera Company for the first half of 1930, playing the roles of Josephine in H.M.S. Pinafore, Mabel in The Pirates of Penzance, Yum-Yum in The Mikado, Rose Maybud in Ruddigore and Gianetta in The Gondoliers.

Cecil performed with The Co-Optimists troupe in 1931. She also performed in music hall and variety in the early 1930s. In 1935, she starred in Shout for Joy at the Blackpool Opera House. She also began singing on the radio in the 1930s.

Cecil rejoined the D'Oyly Carte Opera Company again in 1936. During D'Oyly Carte's 36-week American tour, she played Josephine, Patience, Ida, Yum-Yum, Elsie and Gianetta. During that tour she and Derek Oldham were released by the company for one night to sing a programme of classical and popular favourites, including "Prithee, pretty maiden" from Patience, the evening before President Roosevelt's 2nd inauguration, at a party at the White House. She continued with the company until mid-1937, playing the same roles as she had played on the American tour.

=== Later years ===
Cecil continued to act both in London and on provincial tours for many years and appeared regularly in concerts. She performed in Les Folies des Paris et Londres at the Prince of Wales's Theatre in 1937. In 1941, she appeared in the film Inspector Hornleigh Goes To It (released in the US as Mail Train). In the same year she played Phyllis in a BBC broadcast of Iolanthe, with Bobbie Comber as the Lord Chancellor and Derek Oldham as Tolloller. In 1942, she starred in the title role of a revival of The Maid of the Mountains at the London Coliseum. Together with Martyn Green, she toured Variety Halls during the early years of World War II. They called their act Words with Music, featuring songs from Gilbert and Sullivan.

In the 1940s, Cecil continued to singing regularly on the radio with a variety of orchestras. On the BBC Light Programme she starred in a series called Songs by Sylvia, featuring ballads and songs from musical comedy and opera. On the Home Service she took part in a six-part series on Gilbert and Sullivan written by Leslie Baily, and a series featuring Ivor Novello's music, appearing alongside Olive Gilbert and Novello. In 1945 she appeared in Novello's Perchance to Dream. She next starred as Rosa Cariatanza in Pacific 1860 by Noël Coward opposite Mary Martin in 1946. Theatre World wrote of her performance, "it stirs the audience to a semblance of life". In 1948–49 she toured in a long-running revival of Novello's Glamorous Night.

Cecil starred as Rita in Coward's Ace of Clubs with Pat Kirkwood and Graham Payn in 1950. Theatre.com said of the cast album, "All three stars shine in this smart, sophisticated and amusing score." In 1953 she appeared in Novello's King's Rhapsody. The Manchester Guardian said, "The production ... is worth seeing for the performance of Sylvia Cecil. While all the rest of the cast are straining every sinew to put their parts over (and showing it), Miss Cecil gives the impression of playing with no effort at all. She makes no attempt to take the limelight, but succeeds in being more convincing than all the rest put together. It is a brilliant performance." In 1955, Cecil sang in a revival of Novello's The Dancing Years staged on ice with a cast of 80 skaters.

Cecil appeared at the Savoy Theatre in 1975 with other former members of the D'Oyly Carte Opera Company in the chorus of Trial by Jury at the last night Centenary production of that opera. After the performance, she spoke before the curtain thanking the audience on behalf of the "old favourites" for their warm reception.

== Notes, references and sources ==
=== Sources ===
- Ayre, Leslie (1972). The Gilbert & Sullivan Companion. London: W H Allen. ISBN 0-39-606634-8.
- Green, Stanley (1976). Encyclopedia of the Musical Theatre. New York: Da Capo. ISBN 0-306-80113-2.
- Parker, John, ed. (1925). Who's Who in the Theatre (fifth ed.). London: Sir Isaac Pitman and Sons. OCLC 10013159.
- Rollins, Cyril; R. John Witts (1962). The D'Oyly Carte Opera Company in Gilbert and Sullivan Operas: A Record of Productions, 1875–1961. London: Michael Joseph. OCLC 504581419.
