= Star Chamber (play) =

Play by Noël Coward

Star Chamber is a one-act play by Noël Coward, one of ten that make up Tonight at 8.30, a cycle written to be performed in alternating groups of three plays, across three evenings. In the introduction to a published edition of the plays, Coward wrote, "A short play, having a great advantage over a long one in that it can sustain a mood without technical creaking or over padding, deserves a better fate, and if, by careful writing, acting and producing I can do a little towards reinstating it in its rightful pride, I shall have achieved one of my more sentimental ambitions."

Star Chamber concerns a charity committee meeting among various actors around a table. The play was first performed in London on 21 March 1936. It received only one performance in the original run. However, it has been included in some revivals of the cycle.

== Background and first production ==
Six of the plays in the cycle were first presented at the Manchester Opera House beginning in October 1935. A seventh was added on the subsequent provincial tour, and the final three, including Star Chamber, were added during the London run. Coward directed all ten pieces, and each starred Coward and Gertrude Lawrence. Coward said that he wrote them as "acting, singing, and dancing vehicles for Gertrude Lawrence and myself".

The story in Star Chamber draws on Coward's own experiences as president of the Actors' Orphanage, a post he held from 1934 to 1956. Coward makes fun of egocentric actors and the pedantry of committees. In the play, the president's lapdog is "the most sympathetic character" in the piece. The Coward specialist Barry Day observes that Lawrence was playing a caricature of her real self, while Coward's role was "a second-rate comedian who is always 'on' and always ignored since everyone has heard his stories endless times – Archie Rice anticipated by twenty years." Some have detected a touch of Max Miller in the character, but according to Day it is probably more based on Leslie Henson, a comedian whom Coward did not admire. Day speculates that one reason why Coward withdrew the piece was that his experience as president of the Actors' Orphanage made him uneasy about satirising those who gave their services to such charities, whatever their personal eccentricities.

The play's only performance in the original run was on 21 March 1936 at the Phoenix Theatre.

== Original cast ==
- Jimmie Horlick, stage manager – Kenneth Carten
- J. M. Farmer, secretary of the Garrick Haven Fund – Anthony Pelissier
- Hester More, a very vague actress – Moya Nugent
- Johnny Bolton, a star comedian, of middle age – Noël Coward
- Julian Breed, a leading young actor – Alan Webb
- Violet Vibart, an elderly actress of considerable reputation – Betty Hare
- Maurice Searle – Edward Underdown
- Dame Rose Maitland, an actress – Everley Gregg
- Elise Brodie, an actress – Lumen Edwardes
- Xenia James, an actress, president of the Garrick Haven Fund – Gertrude Lawrence
- Press photographer – Charles Peters

== Plot ==
On the dim, bare stage of a West End theatre the stage manager, Jimmie Horlick, is arranging chairs round a large table in preparation for a meeting of the committee of the Garrick Haven Fund. The committee members gradually appear. First, Mr Farmer, Secretary of the Fund, methodical and harassed, followed by Hester More, a dizzy young actress; Johnny Bolton, "a star comedian of middle age but perennial youthfulness"; Violet Vibart, an elderly actress of great distinction; Julian Breed, a popular juvenile lead; Maurice Searle, a character actor who has grown his hair to shoulder length for an historical role and feels self-conscious about it; the majestic Dame Rose Maitland; the preoccupied Elise Brodie; and finally, and very late, Xenia James, chairman of the committee, with her dog, Atherton.

She opens the meeting and Farmer gives details of the Garrick Haven, established in 1902 to provide a home for destitute actresses. The Fund is well in credit, thanks to the annual fund-raising Fun Fayre. This sets all the others discussing last year's Fayre. Each of them proposes a reorganisation that will raise the profile of his or her own individual side-show. With difficulty, Farmer explains to the committee that its formal consent is required for much-needed structural alterations to the house. At this point Atherton emits unignorable odours and is banished to the property room. Farmer reads a letter from the residents asking for an extra bathroom and lavatory. His detailed costings are unanimously approved. Xenia goes to check on Atherton and reports that he is sound asleep. Farmer attempts to raise further detailed financial points, but the committee members are too busy chatting among themselves to pay attention to what he has to say. Xenia and Julian both have lunch dates and are keen to be away. A press photographer arrives and the committee poses for a group shot while Farmer continues to attempt to get his estimates understood and approved.

Julian and Maurice leave with the photographer. Xenia makes a speech appealing for donations, and promising to give £100 to set the ball rolling. Without formally closing the meeting, she too dashes off, forgetting her dog. The others disperse, Jimmie switches off the lights and leaves, while the howls of the abandoned Atherton are heard from the property room.

== Revivals and adaptations ==
After the maiden performance, Coward withdrew it from the cycle. The Broadway production in 1936 omitted Star Chamber as did the Canadian productions in 1938, the Broadway revivals in 1948 and 1967 and the 1981 Lyric Theatre production in London. In 2000 the Williamstown Theatre Festival revived six of the plays, including Star Chamber. The sheer expense involved in mounting what are effectively ten different productions has usually deterred revivals of the entire Tonight at 8.30 cycle. However, the Antaeus Classical Theater Ensemble in Los Angeles revived all ten plays in October 2007, and the Shaw Festival did so in 2009.

The BBC broadcast the play on the Home Service in May 1940 starring Margaretta Scott, and again in June 1941. In 1991, BBC television mounted productions of the Tonight at 8.30 plays with Joan Collins taking the Lawrence roles, but Star Chamber was omitted. The play was not included in the Heinemann edition of the Tonight at 8.30 plays published in 1936, and was first published in 1939 in Rose Window, a tribute to St Bartholomew's Hospital by twenty-five authors, including Vera Brittain, J.B. Priestley, Hugh Walpole, Emlyn Williams and Radclyffe Hall as well as Coward. The book was illustrated by Anna Zinkeisen, who contributed a drawing of Xenia James (Lawrence's role) to accompany Star Chamber. In connection with Coward's centenary in 1999, the play was printed in the 7th volume of the Methuen series of Coward's Collected Plays.

In 2018, as part of an almost complete cycle of the Tonight at 8.30 plays (omitting Fumed Oak) Star Chamber was revived in London at the Jermyn Street Theatre, with a slightly modified text, directed by Tom Littler. the cast included Ian Hallard as Johnny and Sara Crowe as Xenia. Rosemary Ashe played Violet.
