= Dear Octopus =

Play

First edition

Dear Octopus is a comedy by the playwright and novelist Dodie Smith. It opened at the Queen's Theatre, London on 14 September 1938. On the outbreak of the Second World War in September 1939, the run was halted after 373 performances; after a spell in the provinces in early 1940, the play was brought back to London, and played two further runs there until 31 August 1940.

The play depicts the relationships between three generations of a large family. The "dear octopus" of the title refers to the family itself, whose tentacles its members can never escape.

== Background ==
Smith had been a successful playwright throughout the 1930s. Her 1935 play Call It a Day had the longest run of any play by a woman dramatist up to that time, with 509 performances. The impresario Binkie Beaumont of H. M. Tennent secured the performing rights of Dear Octopus, and offered his friend John Gielgud the romantic lead. Gielgud was happy to accept, having recently finished a season under his own management, which had not been particularly profitable. Gielgud's co-star was Marie Tempest. The role of the retiring young employee who is in love with the hero was originally planned for Celia Johnson or Diana Wynyard, but was played by Angela Baddeley to great critical approval.

The play opened in London after a provincial tour.

The real first night, at the Queen’s Theatre on 14 September 1938, began gloomily. The crisis in Czechoslovakia was on everyone's mind. During the first half, the house was subdued, faces grave and laughs few. It seemed to have become dull. Then, in the first interval, a dramatic deus ex machina, Charles Morgan, arrived from The Times with news, which spread like wildfire through the theatre, that Neville Chamberlain was flying to meet Hitler at Berchtesgaden. "It was as if the whole audience breathed a sigh of relief. And from then on the play went superbly, and built to a magnificent reception."

== Original cast ==
- Charles Randolph – Leon Quartermaine
- Dora Randolph – Marie Tempest
- Hilda Randolph – Nan Munro
- Margery Harvey – Madge Compton
- Cynthia Randolph – Valerie Taylor
- Nicholas Randolph – John Gielgud (later replaced by Hugh Sinclair)
- Hugh Randolph – John Justin
- Gwen (Flouncy) Harvey – Sylvia Hammond
- William Harvey – Pat Sylvester
- Kathleen (Scrap) Kenton – Muriel Pavlow
- Edna Randolph – Una Venning
- Kenneth Harvey – Felix Irwin
- Laurel Randolph – Jean Ormonde
- Belle Schlessinger – Kate Cutler
- Grace Fenning (Fenny) – Angela Baddeley
- Nanny – Annie Esmond
- Gertrude – Margaret Murray

Source: The Times

== Plot ==
As the critics pointed out, there is little plot in the play. The Times summarised the piece thus:

The fourth generation – or can we have lost count and this is the fifth? – remains unseen and unheard in the night nursery, but the other three are all present and correct. They are assembled to do honour to Charles and Dora's golden wedding, and all the honours are done. In the first act the Randolphs explain themselves in the hall; in the second, laid in the nursery, they explain themselves in greater detail, recalling the past … and in the third act they drink the family toast, proposed by Mr Gielgud, and the lady companion is sought in marriage by the eldest son – Mr Gielgud again.

== Critical reception ==
In The Observer, Ivor Brown agreed with his anonymous Times colleague about the lack of plot. He commented that the romance of Fenny and Nicholas provided the play "with what plot it possesses; for the most part it is a family parade offering familiar pleasures. There seems to be a little of everything that playgoers like, from Cinderella in her corner to fun in the nursery, from little talks on God to sentimental speeches on Granny's Golden Wedding." The reviewer in The Manchester Guardian noted that at a poignant scene between the matriarch, the prodigal daughter and an innocent grandchild "handkerchiefs are discreetly a-flutter among the audience in numbers that must delight any dramatist."

== Revivals and adaptations ==
The play was revived in the West End in 1967 at the Haymarket Theatre, with Cicely Courtneidge and Jack Hulbert heading a cast that included Lally Bowers, Ursula Howells, Richard Todd and Joyce Carey. A 1988 production was staged at the Theatre Royal, Windsor.

In 1943, the play was turned into a film of the same title directed by Harold French, starring Margaret Lockwood and Michael Wilding.

A 2024 stage revival at the National Theatre starred Lindsay Duncan, Bessie Carter, Kate Fahy, Malcolm Sinclair and Billy Howle.
