= Relative Values (play) =

Comedy written by Noël Coward

Relative Values is a three-act comedy by Noël Coward. A satire of snobbery in all its guises, it deals with the clash of cultures between Hollywood stars and the English aristocracy, and with "the ancient and inaccurate assumption that, as we are equal in the eyes of God, we should be equal in the eyes of our fellow creatures."

It was first produced in London in 1951 with success, enjoyed several revivals and was made into a film in 2000.

== Background ==
Coward had been entertaining the troops and the home front during World War II, and since Blithe Spirit in 1941 he had not written any comedies (other than musicals). It seemed, after the war, that his idiom of "gay insouciance" was out of fashion. Relative Values marked his return to comic playwriting. It also came as Coward was just beginning a new career, for it opened just a few days after his personal triumph in his first "cabaret" show at the Café de Paris. Relative Values was the first of several plays that achieved at least modest success, including South Sea Bubble (1951), Quadrille (1952) and Nude with Violin (1956), although they failed to match the popularity of his pre-war hits.

== Productions ==
Relative Values opened at the Savoy Theatre on 28 November 1951, after a short provincial tour, and ran until 17 January 1953. The play, directed by the author, starred Gladys Cooper as Felicity, Judy Campbell as Miranda, and Angela Baddeley as Moxie. Later in the run, Cooper was succeeded by Irene Browne.

Relative Values did not have a New York production until 1986, when it was staged by the small Equity Library Theater. Sarah Brightman played Miranda and Susan Hampshire played Felicity in a 1993 revival at the Savoy. A Coward centenary production was given at the Bournemouth Little Theatre in 1999 and one at the Theatre Royal Bath and Theatre Royal, Brighton in 2013 featured Patricia Hodge, Rory Bremner and Caroline Quentin. This production moved to the Harold Pinter Theatre, London, in April 2014.

A film, based on the play, was made in 2000, starring Julie Andrews as Felicity, Colin Firth as Peter, Jeanne Tripplehorn as Miranda and William Baldwin as Don.

== Roles and original cast ==
- Crestwell – Richard Leech
- Alice – Renée Hill
- Mrs Moxton (Moxie) – Angela Baddeley
- Felicity, Countess of Marshwood – Gladys Cooper
- Lady Hayling – Dorothy Batley
- Admiral Sir John Hayling – Charles Cullum
- The Hon Peter Ingleton – Simon Lack
- The Earl of Marshwood (Nigel) – Ralph Michael
- Miranda Frayle – Judy Campbell
- Don Lucas – Hugh McDermott

== Synopsis ==
The action of the play takes place in Marshwood House, East Kent. Time: the present.

=== Act I ===
- Scene I: Saturday afternoon, after lunch

Crestwell, butler to Nigel Marshwood, and Dora Moxton ("Moxie"), maid to Nigel's mother, Felicity, discuss the forthcoming marriage of Nigel to the actress Miranda Frayle. Crestwell is unenthusiastic but philosophical; Moxie is deeply unhappy about it and says she will resign. Felicity and a group of her friends enter. They too discuss the forthcoming marriage, with no enthusiasm. Nigel has been married before and they regard him as a poor judge of women. The friends exit, and Felicity tries to find out why Moxie is so determined to leave if Nigel marries Miranda. Eventually Moxie reveals the reason: Miranda is her younger sister.

- Scene II: A few hours later

Felicity and her nephew Peter Ingleton discuss the situation. Felicity is determined not to be parted from the indispensable Moxie. As it is out of the question that Moxie can continue as a maid in the household of her own sister, Peter suggests that Moxie should be promoted to companion to Felicity. They consult Crestwell, telling him what they propose and why. He brings Moxie from her room and the four discuss what is to be done. Crestwell suggests taking Moxie's transformation a step further, giving it out that she has inherited money and has resigned, and is staying at Marshwood House as a personal friend of Felicity's. Moxie is reluctant, but agrees that if this is only way in which she and Felicity can remain together she will make the attempt.

=== Act II ===
- Scene I: Before dinner

Nigel and Miranda have arrived from London. He and Felicity discuss Moxie's sudden rise in the world. He tries not to be snobbish, but is nonplussed by the thought of a former servant being on equal terms with the family. Miranda enters and makes polite conversation. Moxie enters, impeccably dressed and coifed. Miranda does not recognise her. To Moxie's suppressed fury, Miranda spins yarns about her upbringing and family, pretending she was a slum child with an abusive, alcoholic elder sister, whom, she says, she still supports financially. Felicity's dinner guests arrive and are confused by Moxie's new eminence. Crestwell encourages her to keep up the pretence.

- Scene II: After dinner

Miranda's previous lover, the Hollywood actor Don Lucas arrives, uninvited and slightly drunk, hoping to regain Miranda's affections. Crestwell gives him a drink and urges him on. Don encounters Miranda and tries to woo her. Miranda asks him to leave. They are interrupted by the entrance of Felicity who invites Don to stay the night. Nigel is not pleased at having his former rival under his roof, but Felicity insists. Nigel announces that he and Miranda will be married by special licence the next morning. Moxie, still upset at Miranda's earlier lies, and determined that Nigel and Miranda will not marry, reveals that she is Miranda's elder sister and that Miranda's reminiscences are all lies: "Poverty and squalor, indeed! A London Cockney born within the sound of Bow Bells! You were born in No 3 Station Road, Sidcup, and if you can hear the sound of Bow Bells from Sidcup you must have the ears of an elk-hound!"

=== Act III ===
- The next morning

Moxie has announced her intention to leave at once. Peter and Crestwell, and then Felicity, continue to encourage Don in his pursuit of Miranda. Nigel is confused and distressed at the turn of events. His desire to marry Miranda has faded with the revelation that Moxie is her sister, but having given his word he sees it as his duty to go ahead with the marriage. Miranda is frustrated by her conversations first with Felicity and then with Nigel, and decides that she is better off with Don than as Nigel's wife (and Felicity's daughter-in-law). Miranda and Don leave together. Moxie and Crestwell celebrate the happy outcome with a glass of sherry. Crestwell proposes a toast to the status quo.

== Reception ==
The press reviews were consistently enthusiastic about the cast but more guarded about the play itself. The Observer said, "The dramatist has left the players an empty third act, which vacuum they easily conceal. It all goes most pleasantly – with this team and with the author's guidance. But less perfectly played, Relative Values might be far less easy on the ear and on the eye than it now is." The Times agreed, though judging the play as a whole "undoubtedly successful". The Daily Express critic wrote, "Its success is certain" but added, "I tried hard to convince myself that his impudent talent glinted here at its brightest. I am sorry I failed. The Daily Mirror commented, "The play, despite flashes of wit (with Coward coming the old acid as only he can) was oddly unattractive.... Gladys Cooper nobly carried the whole on her talented shoulders. She almost presented it as vintage champagne instead of just – well, vintage. The Manchester Guardian noted that several things fell flat, including the toast at the end, and judged the play old-fashioned but done well: "The skill gives pleasure... never less than professionally neat, and often something much more – genuinely witty."
