= South Sea Bubble (play) =

Play by Noël Coward

Ronald Lewis and Vivien Leigh in Act 2

South Sea Bubble is a play by Noël Coward, described in the published text as a light comedy. It was written in 1949 but not performed until 1951, and not in its final form until 1956. Under the title Island Fling it was given in the US at the Westport Country Playhouse and the Cape Playhouse in Massachusetts in July and August 1951 with Claudette Colbert in the starring role. After a pre-London tour the British production opened at the Lyric Theatre in the West End in April 1956, starring Vivien Leigh. It ran for 276 performances.

The play depicts the consequences when romance and politics overlap in a British colonial territory in the Pacific.

== Background and first productions ==
Since the end of the Second World War, Coward's new stage works had failed to match the success of his earlier productions. His Blithe Spirit (1941) had run for nearly 2,000 performances in London, but his revue Sigh No More (1945), his musical Pacific 1860 (1946), drama Peace in Our Time (1946) and musical play Ace of Clubs had run for, respectively, 213, 129, 167 and 211 performances. The setting of the play, the Pacific island Samolo, had been invented by Coward for Pacific 1860 and was reused as the setting for his drama Volcano (1957) and his only novel, Pomp and Circumstance (1960). The author's original title for the piece was Home and Colonial, changed before the American production to Island Fling.

The play was originally written as a vehicle for Coward's close friend Gertrude Lawrence, the central character being partly based on two of his other friends, Diana Cooper and Edwina Mountbatten. Lawrence liked the play, but for tax reasons could not go to Britain and play it there. She wished to open it in the US, which the author thought a disastrous idea: "It is typically English ... Gertie might get away with it in America, but half the point would be lost". To Lawrence's chagrin Coward sounded out other star actresses about appearing in the piece. His American producer and agent, Jack Wilson, recruited Claudette Colbert to play the leading role for a short summer stock season in 1951. The following year Coward discussed with Lawrence the possibility of rewriting the play for her, but this came to nothing and Lawrence died suddenly later in the year.

For the British production Coward offered the part to Vivien Leigh, who at first disliked it and asked for substantial revisions, after which he found her "madly enthusiastic" about it. He wrote in his diary:

I have been pressing on with Home and Colonial and have rewritten the whole play except for the hut scene and a few good bits here and there. It has been a salutary experience. It really wasn't good enough and was curiously overwritten. I seem, in later years, to have lost my gift for economy. This has been, and in the future must continue to be, remedied. It is now very good, I think, light and undated.

After Coward finished rewriting the play in 1955, it opened at the Opera House, Manchester on 19 March 1956 for a five-week pre-London tour, taking in Liverpool, Edinburgh, Glasgow and Newcastle before opening at the Lyric Theatre, London, where it ran for 276 performances.

=== Original casts ===
Role	US, 1951	UK, 1956
Lord Sharpenhoe (US)/John Blair Kennedy (UK) (known as Boffin in both versions)	Chester Stratton (Note: Mander and Mitchenson (1957) correctly identify Stratton as the player of this role, but in the second edition (2000) it is erroneously ascribed to Arthur Macrae.)	Arthur Macrae
The Hon Maud Witterby (US only)	Edith Meiser	—
Captain Christopher Mortlock (aide-de-camp to the Governor)	Gordon Mills	Clifford Elkin (Manchester); Peter Barkworth (London)
Sir George Shotter (Governor of the Samolan Islands)	Berry Kroeger	Ian Hunter
Lady Alexandra "Sandy" Shotter	Claudette Colbert	Vivien Leigh
Punalo Alani	Reginald Mason	Alan Webb
Sanyamo (a butler)	Don Glenn	William Peacock
Naeena (US only)	Judy Fineman	—
Edward Honey	Peter Boyne	John Moore
Cuckoo Honey (his wife)	Cherry Hardy	Joyce Carey
Admiral Turling (Commander Turling in US)	A. J. Herbert	Nicholas Grimshaw
Mrs Turling (his wife)	Esther Mitchell	Daphne Newton
Robert Frome (chief of police)	Roy Johnson	Eric Phillips
Hali Alani	Leon Janney	Ronald Lewis

In the British production, Peter Finch was due to co-star with Vivien Leigh, but his film commitments obliged him to pull out the month before the premiere, and his role of Hali Alani went to Ronald Lewis. During the run, Leigh was succeeded as Sandra by Elizabeth Sellars (from 13 August); Daphne Newton took over from Joyce Carey as Cuckoo in September, and was succeeded as Mrs Turling by Betty Woolfe.

== Synopsis ==
The summary refers to the final, 1955, version of the play, published in 1956. The play is set on the island of Samolo, a British possession in the Pacific Ocean.

=== Act 1 ===
Samolo has two main political factions: one favours continued British rule; the other calls for independence. The Governor, Sir George Shotter, is of a liberal inclination and sympathises with the latter. The old-Etonian grandee, Pulano Alani, heads the anti-independence party. Lady Shotter (Sandra) agrees to use her well-known charm to try to bring Pulano's son Hali round to a more progressive position.

Sandra's friend John Blair Kennedy, known as Boffin, arrives at Government House. He is an eminent novelist, and the Governor wants him to give public lectures and open a new wing of the University library, which he is reluctant to do. Sandra persuades him to at least open the library. She has planned a dinner-party for him, to which she has invited some leading British residents and the Alanis.

The guests begin to arrive. Edward Honey is earnest and conscientious, but his wife, Cuckoo, is a trouble-making gossip, who hints that there was something between Boffin and Sandra before her marriage. The last guest to arrive is the chief of police, Robert Frome, who apologises for being delayed while investigating the theft of a car, of which there have lately been several.

=== Act 2 ===
The dinner-party is over and the guests are ready to leave. Hali is out in the garden with Sandra, and Cuckoo Honey is talking to Boffin, disparaging his novels – which amuses him:

Cuckoo: I should have thought a man in your position would be big enough to be able to take a little honest criticism.
Boffin: Why?
Cuckoo: But I see I was wrong.
Boffin: Then you're making giant strides ...

When she criticises Sandra for her preoccupation with Hali, Boffin is considerably less amused. His sarcastic response causes her to flounce out, immediately before Sandra and Hali come in from the garden. At Sandra's instigation Boffin goes into the next room and plays the piano. When he begins to play dance music, Hali persuades Sandra to dance with him. Cuckoo, coming back for her handbag, sees the two dancing together and is scandalised. Returning, Shotter declines Hali's offer of a lift to a late-night party being given by one of the expatriate community, but Sandra accepts.

After the party, Hali drives Sandra to his beach house. He has had too much to drink, and after a skirmish with Sandra he seizes her and kisses her passionately. She grasps a bottle from the drinks cabinet and knocks him out with it, after which she snatches up her cloak and bag and makes her escape.

=== Act 3 ===
At Government House next morning, Sandra enters, cheerfully unrepentant. She is shocked out of this mood when Frome reports that Hali is in hospital with concussion, having seemingly been attacked in his beach house. Both Boffin and Shotter correctly suspect who Hali's attacker was. Sandra is evasive, but when her husband asks her outright, "Once and for all, Sandra, did you or did you not go with Hali Alani to his beach house last night and bash him over the head with a bottle?" she retorts, "Certainly I did. And if you don't stop bellowing at me I'll do the same to you. Come, Boffin!" She sweeps out of the room, followed by Boffin.

Punalo Alani comes to see the Governor. He too has worked out what happened at the beach hut and attempts to pressure Shotter into backing his anti-independence party in exchange for Punalo's promise not to give the press the story of the previous night's "attempted murder" by Sandra. Shotter is indignant, and their conversation becomes heated. The situation is resolved by the arrival of Hali, his head bandaged. He is sober and repentant, and protects Sandra by announcing that his assailant was a man well known as a political extremist. Punalo, forced thereby to drop his attempt to blackmail Shotter, does so with a good grace, Hali and Sandra apologise to each other, and the Shotters and the Alanis go in to luncheon together in good spirits and on the friendliest of terms.

== Critical reception ==
The American notices were mixed. In The New York Telegraph, George Freedley called the play funnier and better than Coward's Present Laughter. He regretted that Colbert's film commitments would prevent her from playing the piece on Broadway. Cyrus Durgin, in The Boston Globe, thought it "a sort of Somerset Maugham story with Coward treatment … mostly warmed-over Coward in the old manner of Private Lives and Design for Living".

The notices for the London production were also mixed. The Daily Express judged the play Coward's best for ten years. The Observer found the conservative politics of the piece and its dialogue ("an anthology of Coward cliché") equally unpleasing. The Times thought the scene where Sandy knocks Hali out "not very much of a comedy". The Manchester Guardian found the same scene "one of the crispest and most eloquent moments that the English comedy stage has provided for years," but thought the author's touch uncertain elsewhere. In The Sunday Times, Harold Hobson called the piece "the best play Mr Coward has written for a long time".

== Adaptations ==
The London cast appeared in a BBC television adaptation, abbreviated to 45 minutes, given before an invited audience at the Lyric, broadcast on 17 September 1956. Joyce Carey and Elizabeth Sellars reprised their stage roles. A BBC radio adaptation in 1980 starred Moira Lister as Sandra, with Michael Denison (Shotter), Hugh Burden (Boffin), Margaretta Scott (Honey), and Bryan Pringle and Tony Osoba (the Alanis).

== Notes, references and sources ==
=== Sources ===
- Coward, Noël (1982). Payn, Graham; Morley, Sheridan (eds.). The Noël Coward Diaries (1941–1969). London: Methuen. ISBN 978-0-297-78142-4.
- Hoare, Philip (1995). Noël Coward, A Biography. London: Sinclair-Stevenson. ISBN 978-1-4081-0675-4.
- Lahr, John (1982). Coward the Playwright. London: Methuen. ISBN 978-0-413-48050-7.
- Lesley, Cole (1976). The Life of Noël Coward. London: Jonathan Cape. ISBN 978-0-224-01288-1.
- Mander, Raymond; Mitchenson, Joe (1957). Theatrical Companion to Coward. London: Rockliffe. OCLC 903874732.
- Mander, Raymond; Mitchenson, Joe (2000) [1957]. Day, Barry; Morley, Sheridan (eds.). Theatrical Companion to Coward (second ed.). London: Oberon. ISBN 978-1-84002-054-0.
