= Betty Hare =

British actress and singer (1898–1981)

Betty Hare (31 March 1898 – 9 May 1981) was a British actress and singer. She appeared in revues, musicals, spoken comedies and dramas in a career that spanned more than fifty years. Her first and last West End appearances were in works by Noël Coward – his musicals Cavalcade (1931) and Sail Away (1962). She also appeared in four other Coward shows. She toured extensively in Britain and also in Africa, Asia and Australia.

== Life and career ==
=== Early years ===
Hare was born Bessie Maud Hare. In her entry in Who's Who in the Theatre she claimed to have been "born in a caravan, on tour, March 1900"; (Note: In the introduction to the 1925 edition of Who's Who in the Theatre the editor comments on the propensity of performers of both sexes to deduct a few years from their real ages.) in fact she is listed in official records as being born on 31 March 1898 at Treharris, Glamorgan, Wales. She was the daughter of Herbert Edwin Hare and his wife, Kate, née Tansley, who were both actors. Bessie, their eldest child, described herself as having "been on the stage since early childhood in 'fit-ups', music-halls, choruses etc, having made her first appearance at the age of two, when she was carried on by her mother in Uncle Tom's Cabin".

Hare, billed as Betty rather than Bessie, appeared in a wide range of productions in provincial theatres before, during and after the First World War. She was seen in 1913 as "The Searchlight Girl" in variety in resorts on the south coast and in the Channel Islands; in melodrama (as comic relief) in 1914; in pantomime in 1917; in a cabaret entertainment, High Tide, in 1924; and in revues – Bon Voyage, in 1927, and Oh, Countess! in 1928. A reviewer in a local paper described her as "a very able artiste, who sings, acts and dances equally well". From 1929 to 1931 she toured in India, the Far East, Australia and South Africa.

=== West End ===
Hare made her West End début in October 1931, playing Marion Christie in Noël Coward's Cavalcade at the Theatre Royal, Drury Lane. It was the first of six Coward productions in which she created roles. In September 1932 she was in the cast of his Words and Music, as was her younger sister, Doris Hare. In Manchester and then in the West End in 1933 she played Winnie (and three other roles) in Cole Porter's Nymph Errant, after which came two revues at the Palace Theatre: Why Not To-Night? and Streamline. At the Adelphi in April 1935 she appeared in another revue, Stop Press!

At the Phoenix Theatre in 1936 she created roles in two of the ten plays in Coward's cycle of short pieces, Tonight at 8.30, playing Violet Vibart in Star Chamber and Mildred in Still Life. When Coward took the cycle to New York later in the year she again played Mildred (Star Chamber was not played in New York). Her other stage appearances of the 1930s were in Destination Unknown (as the Hospital Nurse and Betty at the Q Theatre, 1937) and in Dodsworth (Palace, 1938). During the Second World War she appeared in the West End and on tour in six productions: the Cochran revue Lights Up, (Savoy Theatre, February 1940); another revue, Sky High (Phoenix, June 1942); a comic American play, My Sister Eileen (Savoy, September 1943); a dramatisation of Little Women (as Mrs March, on tour, 1944); another American comedy, Three's a Family (Saville Theatre, September 1944); and a British comedy, The Great Day (as Mrs Mumford, on tour 1945).

=== Post-war ===
At Drury Lane in December 1946 Hare played Teresa Scobie in Coward's musical Pacific 1860, the show was not a great success, closing in April 1947 after 129 performances, but Hare was quickly cast as Sylvia Potter-Porter in Irving Berlin's Annie Get Your Gun, which ran for 1,300 performances at the Coliseum from June 1947 to May 1950.

During the 1950s Hare appeared as Mrs Rignold in Arnold Ridley's comedy Beggar My Neighbour (King's, Hammersmith, April 1952); Lady Lindley in The Merry Month (Q Theatre, November 1953); Mrs Maynard in a controversial drama, Vice In the Street (Wimbledon Theatre, March 1954); and Letty in First Night, a comedy-drama about a theatrical family (on tour, 1955).

Hare's final stage roles were in the first half of the 1960s. At the Duke of York's Theatre in September 1960, she played Dora, the dresser to Sybil Thorndike's Lotta Bainbridge, in Coward's Waiting in the Wings; at the Comedy in February 1962 she played the Elderly Actress in Elaine Dundy's My Place; her last West End role was Eileen Leopard in Coward's musical Sail Away at the Savoy in June 1962. In 1965 she toured as Mrs Pearce in My Fair Lady.

Hare died in Chichester, West Sussex, on 9 May 1981, aged 83.

== Notes, references and sources ==
=== Sources ===
- Coward, Noël (1960). Waiting in the Wings. London: Samuel French. OCLC 1336194042.
- Eells, George (1967). The Life That Late He Led: A Biography of Cole Porter. New York. OCLC 3991744.
- Gaye, Freda, ed. (1967). Who's Who in the Theatre (fourteenth ed.). London: Sir Isaac Pitman and Sons. OCLC 5997224.
- Mander, Raymond; Joe Mitchenson (1955). Theatrical Companion to Coward. London: Rockliffe. OCLC 1336174067.
- Parker, John, ed. (1925). Who's Who in the Theatre (fifth ed.). London: Sir Isaac Pitman and Sons. OCLC 10013159.
- Parker, John; Freda Gaye; Ian Herbert, eds. (1978). Who Was Who in the Theatre. Detroit: Gale Research. OCLC 310466458.
