= Relative Values (film) =

2000 British comedy film

- Film logo
- Directed by: Eric Styles
- Produced by: Christopher Milburn
- Starring: Julie Andrews; Edward Atterton; William Baldwin; Colin Firth; Stephen Fry; Sophie Thompson; Jeanne Tripplehorn
- Cinematography: Jimmy Dibling
- Edited by: Caroline Limmer
- Music by: John Debney
- Production companies: Alliance Atlantis; Isle of Man Film Commission; Overseas Filmgroup; Midsummer Films
- Distributed by: Alliance Releasing
- Release date: 23 June 2000
- Running time: 87 minutes
- Country: United Kingdom
- Language: English

Relative Values is a 2000 British comedy film adaptation of the 1950s play of the same name by Noël Coward. It stars Julie Andrews, Edward Atterton, William Baldwin, Colin Firth, Stephen Fry, Sophie Thompson and Jeanne Tripplehorn and was directed by Eric Styles. It was filmed on location in the Isle of Man, mainly at The Nunnery, with scenes at Kirk Braddan.

== Plot ==
There is unrest brewing in the upper class Marshwood household, following the announcement of Nigel, The Earl of Marshwood's engagement to glamorous 'American' film actress, Miss Miranda Frayle - having proposed after just two months. Many members of his family and society friends disapprove of the match, fearing Nigel would be marrying below his class. Meanwhile the Hollywood studio gossip magazines are full of her former on and off-screen love affair with fellow film star - Don Lucas, and other members of the household are overwhelmed with the excitement of having a famous film star marrying into the family.

Lord Marshwood brings Miranda home to his country estate to meet his mother - Felicity, Lady Marshwood. The visit prompts Lady Marshwood's personal maid - 'Moxie', to reveal that Miranda is in fact her estranged sister and after twenty years of faithful service, she must leave to avoid the 'social timebomb' should it become known. Unable to do without her, Lady Marshwood and her nephew Peter devise a charade (with the help of the butler) so that Moxie may meet her sister as an equal. Moxie is subsequently moved from 'below stairs' (with the servants) to 'upstairs' (with the family) and is transformed with make-up, wearing some of Lady Marshwood's clothes and jewellery for dinner with the family - pretending to be an independent lady of means (keeping her real identity secret). However, during dinner Miranda lies about her past (stating she was born a cockney, had a difficult childhood living in a slum and that her only sister ill-treated her when she was drunk and was in fact dead). Moxie finds it harder and harder to hide her identity and during dinner (not used to alcohol) she gets more and more drunk, to the amusement of Peter (who has a crush on Lucas) and the horror of Lady Marshwood. Meanwhile, Miranda's ex-boyfriend - the handsome and dashing film star Don Lucas arrives at Marshwood House, wanting Miranda back.

Lucas contrives a secret meeting with Miranda in the garden, but Lady Marshwood surprises them and catches them kissing. Realising that he is still in love with Miranda and his presence may break up her son's relationship with Miranda - she invites Lucas to stay the night. In a fit of jealousy, Lord Marshwood announces that he and Miranda are to be married within days, prompting Moxie to announce (during an argument under the influence of alcohol) her true identity: that Miranda was in fact called 'Freda Birch' and was born in Sidcup, Kent and she broke their late mother's heart by running off to America with her then lover - to the horror of Miranda and Lord Marshwood.

The next morning (Sunday), Lady Marshwood tells Lucas that Miranda is still in love with him, and that his cause is not a hopeless one. She then tells her son that he should ask Lucas to be his best man, but he tells his mother that he now has doubts about marrying Miranda. Lady Marshwood subsequently admits to Miranda that she doesn't want her to marry her son and sows the seed that Lord Marshwood may no longer be entirely in love with her. Moxie apologises to Miranda, telling her that she went too far and has decided to leave Marshwood House. Once again in the garden, Lady Marshwood catches Miranda kissing Lucas as she finally agrees to leave with him, and she says farewell to Lord Marshwood, ending their engagement. With Miranda finally gone, Moxie is told she can now stay and the family head off to church (as if nothing had happened) - where Lord Marshwood meets a well-dressed, attractive local lady at the door, who Lady Marshwood gracefully smiles approvingly at, as he goes into church with her instead of Miranda, as originally planned.

== Cast ==
- Julie Andrews as Felicity, Countess of Marshwood
- Edward Atterton as Nigel, The Earl of Marshwood
- William Baldwin as Don Lucas
- Colin Firth as Peter
- Stephen Fry as Crestwell
- Sophie Thompson as Moxie
- Jeanne Tripplehorn as Miranda Frayle

== Critical reception ==
Relative Values received mixed reviews from critics upon its release.

Peter Bradshaw of The Guardian noted the film's attempt to dissolve theatrical boundaries from Noël Coward's original play, describing the result as "muddling the clarity and unity" of the setting. He felt the production resembled an "ersatz" 1950s Britain and found Julie Andrews’s performance "regal" but somewhat strained. Despite this, he praised Stephen Fry's supporting turn as the butler for being "outstandingly funny".

Michael Thomson of the BBC gave the film a favorable review, highlighting Julie Andrews's "grand old time" performance and praising the film's humor and polished cast. He found the adaptation entertaining, noting its "fun in every frame".

Derek Elley of Variety considered the film only a partial success, criticizing its direction as "awkward" and its structure as "too much action and reverse film structure". However, he acknowledged that Andrews "doesn't look to make much effort and doesn't need to", suggesting her screen presence carried the film to an extent.

Patrick Peters from Empire praised the adaptation's opening segment and noted the film's "precision and polish", remarking that the cast performed as though they truly belonged to the period setting. He also commended the farcical tone maintained throughout most of the film, calling it "a film that recalls the montage sequences that no self-respecting 1930s movie was without".

In contrast, Allan Hunter of Screen Daily offered a more critical take, describing the film as a "merciless British market write-off". He pointed out that the material felt dated and the direction overly workmanlike. Although he praised Julie Andrews's "crisp comic talent", he felt most of the cast failed to elevate the material, calling it a "plodding theatricality".

== Soundtrack ==
Relative Values

Soundtrack album by John Debney and various artists
- Genre: Soundtrack, easy listening, light music, jazz
- Length: 39:30
- Label: Silva Screen Records Label

Julie Andrews chronology
My Favourite Broadway: The Leading Ladies (1999)	Relative Values (2000)	My Favourite Broadway: The Love Songs (2001)

Relative Values is the soundtrack album for the film, featuring 20 tracks composed primarily by John Debney and performances by artists such as Rick Riso, Gaye Brown, Julie Andrews, and Colin Firth. Blending baroque music, light orchestral arrangements, and jazz/swing influences, the album includes original compositions like "The Kiss", "Rumba and Romance", and "Goodbyes", alongside dialogue pieces from the cast. The opening track, "Almost Like Being in Love", performed by Rick Riso, evokes the style of Frank Sinatra with orchestration reminiscent of Billy May and Nelson Riddle. Debney's work incorporates pastiche techniques inspired by composers like Robert Farnon, Leroy Anderson, and Henry Mancini, creating a soundtrack that reflects the film's atmosphere with both cheerful and romantic tones.

Critic Ian Lace awarded the Relative Values soundtrack four out of five stars. In his review, he highlighted Debney's skill in the easy listening and light music genres, emphasizing the charm and wit present in the compositions. Lace noted that the musical references range from baroque influences to mid-20th-century light and swing music traditions. He described Rick Riso's vocal performance on "Almost Like Being in Love" as notably similar to Frank Sinatra's style, supported by a backing that recalls the work of May and Riddle. Lace also praised Debney's original music as tuneful and emotionally resonant, suggesting that fans of John Williams' score for Sabrina would find much to appreciate in this album.

=== Track listing ===
Songs from the film Relative Values
No.	Title	Writer(s)	Artist/Performer	Length
1.	"Almost Like Being In Love"	John Debney	Rick Riso	3:38
2.	"Relative Values"	John Debney	John Debney	1:48
3.	"Class Distinction"	John Debney	Gaye Brown, Julie Andrews	0:33
4.	"Miranda’s Theme"	John Debney	John Debney	1:40
5.	"The Fleet's In Town"	John Debney	Colin Firth, Katy Stephens	0:28
6.	"Manor Preparations"	John Debney	John Debney	3:31
7.	"Crestwell, how much do you know?"	John Debney	Julie Andrews, Stephen Fry	0:28
8.	"Romance in 7/8"	John Debney	John Debney	1:51
9.	"Miranda and Nigel Arrive"	John Debney	John Debney	3:08
10.	"B Movies"	John Debney	John Debney	1:28
11.	"So Lovely To Meet You"	John Debney	Colin Firth, Edward Atterton, Sophie Thompson	0:38
12.	"Moxie Intoxicated"	John Debney	John Debney	2:41
13.	"Sir Frederick Crestwell"	John Debney	William Baldwin, Stephen Fry	1:13
14.	"Rumba and Romance"	John Debney	John Debney	3:16
15.	"The Kiss"	John Debney	John Debney	2:59
16.	"It's The Oldest Story In The World"	John Debney	Julie Andrews, Sophie Thompson, William Baldwin, Colin Firth	0:52
17.	"Goodbyes"	John Debney	John Debney	1:47
18.	"The 11-15"	John Debney	Edward Atterton, Jeanne Tripplehorn	0:15
19.	"Theme from Relative Values"	John Debney	John Debney	3:38
20.	"Almost Like Being In Love (Instrumental)"	John Debney		3:38
