= Conversation Piece (musical) =

1934 musical written by English playwright Noël Coward

- Noël Coward, Louis Hayward and Yvonne Printemps
- Music: Noël Coward
- Lyrics: Noël Coward
- Productions: 1934 West End and Broadway

Conversation Piece, billed as "A Romantic Comedy with Music", is a musical written by Noël Coward. It premiered at His Majesty's Theatre, London, on 16 February 1934, and ran for 177 performances over five months. A Broadway production opened at the 44th Street Theatre later that year but ran for only 55 performances.

== Background ==
Conversation Piece was inspired by the book The Regent and his Daughter by Dormer Creston (1881–1973). Coward wrote the libretto in 1933 while on a sea voyage from Trinidad to England and composed the score on his return home. From the outset, Coward had the French star Yvonne Printemps in mind for the leading role of Mélanie, despite the fact that she spoke no English. Printemps agreed to play the part, and with the aid of her partner, Pierre Fresnay, learned the words by rote. The male lead, Paul, Duc de Chaucigny-Varennes, was given to Romney Brent, but during rehearsals Coward came to think Brent was not up to the part, and asked him to relinquish it. On learning that Coward himself proposed to take the role, Brent gladly resigned, "providing you let me still come to rehearsals and watch you find out what a bloody awful part it is." Whether or not Coward came to share Brent's view, he handed the part over to Pierre Fresnay after three months. Other members of the large cast included Louis Hayward, Maidie Andrews and George Sanders, with Valerie Hobson in the chorus.

The big tune from the show, "I'll Follow My Secret Heart", caused Coward much difficulty while he was composing the score, and he was on the verge of giving up the whole show:

I poured myself a large whisky and soda... and sat gloomily envisaging everyone's disappointment and facing the fact that my talent had withered and that I should never write any more music until the day I died. ... I switched off the light at the door and noticed that there was one lamp left on by the piano. I walked automatically to turn it off, sat down, and played "I'll Follow My Secret Heart" straight through in G flat, a key I had never played in before.

== Premiere ==
The piece opened at His Majesty's Theatre, London on 16 February 1934, presented by Charles B. Cochran. The cast was:

- Sophie Otford – Heather Thatcher
- Martha James – Moya Nugent
- Mrs Dragon – Betty Shale
- Paul, Duc de Chaucigny-Varennes – Noël Coward
- Melanie – Yvonne Printemps
- Rose (Her Maid) – Maidie Andrews
- The Marquis of Sheere – Louis Hayward
- The Earl of Harringford – George Sanders
- Lord Braceworth – Pat Worsley
- Lord Donning – Antony Brian
- Mr Hailsham – Sydney Grammer
- The Duchess of Beneden – Winifred Davis
- The Duke of Beneden – Athole Stewart
- Lady Julia Charters – Irene Browne
- Hannah (Her Maid) – Elizabeth Corcoran
- A Tiger – Tommy Hayes
- Miss Goslett – Everley Gregg
- Miss Mention – Molly Lumley
- Lord Kenyon – Penryn Bannerman
- Lord St Marys – Kim Peacock
- Fishermen – Reginald Thurgood, William McGuigan, Evan Jones, Roy Hall
- Countess of Harringford – Sheila Pattrick
- Lady Braceworth – Betty Elbum
- Mrs Hailsham – Winifred Campbell
- Hon Julian Kane – St John Lauri
- Mr Amos – Alex Robertson
- Butler – Claude Farrow
- Mr Jones – Leonard Michel
- Courtesan – Jean Barnes

Source:Theatrical Companion to Coward.

The show had a truncated run of 177 performances, by contrast with Coward's earlier romantic musical Bitter Sweet (697 performances), because Printemps had to leave the cast to fulfil a film commitment in France, and no suitable replacement could be found. Later that year, the Broadway run, despite starring Printemps, managed only 55 performances. With the onset of the Depression, times had changed since the success of Bitter Sweet, and Conversation Piece was unable to find an audience. In New York, Fresnay played Paul, Irene Browne was Lady Julia, and Carl Harbord was Lord Sheere.

The London cast released a cast album in 1934. Beginning in the late 1940s, Columbia Records recorded a series of musicals produced by Goddard Lieberson and musical director Lehman Engel, including Conversation Piece in 1951. Coward sang the role of Paul, and the recording featured opera singer Lily Pons, the young Richard Burton, Cathleen Nesbitt and Ethel Griffies.

== Plot ==
The story is set in Regency Brighton in 1811. Paul, the Duc de Chaucigny-Varennes, an émigré from the terrors of the French Revolution, is passing off Melanie, a beautiful young girl, as his ward – the daughter of an executed friend, the Marquis de Tramont. In fact, Melanie is a dance hall singer. Paul's plan is to marry Melanie to a rich husband such as Edward, Marquis of Sheere, who seeks her hand. The rich Lady Julia Charteris, who is much taken with Paul, encourages Edward's marital plans and tries to woo Paul for herself. But Melanie has long loved Paul, and in a last gamble to turn him away from Lady Julia, she pretends to return to France. Her trick works: Paul realises the depth of his feelings for her and there is a romantic happy ending.

== Musical numbers ==
- Ladies and Gentlemen
- Overture
- A cloud has passed across the sun
- I'll follow my secret heart
- Regency rakes
- Charming! Charming! Charming!
- There's always something fishy about the French
- Prologue – Act II
- Soldiers!
- English lesson – The tree is in the garden
- There was once a little village
- Melanie's aria – Dear friends
- Mothers and wives
- Nevermore

The Noël Coward Society's website, drawing on performing statistics from the publishers and the Performing Rights Society, ranks "I'll follow my secret heart" among Coward's ten most popular songs.

== Critical reception ==
The show was well received. In The Daily Telegraph, W. A. Darlington wrote, "If you cannot afford a ticket for this show any other way, sell your wife's jewellery or your children's school books. You will never regret the sacrifice". He said of Printemps:

She is, indeed, an exquisite actress, with a bewitching personality. She sings, too, with the unfettered ease of a bird. It was from the moment when she first sang the romantic theme-song, "I'll Follow My Secret Heart" (of which we shall hear more anon from all the gramophones in the world), that she had her audience in thrall last night.

Darlington added that Coward shared Printemps's triumph: "Or, rather, since he is author, composer, producer, and chief male actor in this brilliant show, he enjoys a separate triumph all to himself".

The Stage praised the piece and said "Small wonder that the curtain finally falls amid 'a halo of enthusiastic cheering'". (Note: Quoting The Pickwick Papers, Chapter VII) The Sunday Dispatch commented, "This new Coward, who fulfils in Conversation Piece the promise which he gave us in Cavalcade must be acclaimed a master of the theatre. When the New York production opened, the press were less laudatory about Coward's piece – Burns Mantle wrote, "Conversation Piece will never go down in the biographies as one of his masterpieces" – but praised the performers highly. Another critic felt that good as Pierre Fresnay was as the leading man, Printemps would have been better supported by Coward or by her former husband and frequent co-star Sacha Guitry.

Coward's own view of the piece was summed up in a letter he wrote to Alexander Woolcott during the London run: "The play is a great success, the music and lyrics are good and the production excellent [but] the play itself is I think dull and garbled and I am faintly ashamed of it.

== Notes, references and sources ==
=== Sources ===
- Castle, Charles (1974) Noël, Sphere Books, London, ISBN 0-349-10482-4
- Day, Barry (ed.) (2007) The Letters of Noël Coward, Methuen, London, ISBN 978-0-7136-8578-7
- Lesley, Cole (1976) The Life of Noël Coward, Jonathan Cape, London, ISBN 0-224-01288-6
- Mander, Raymond; Joe Mitchenson (2000) [1957]. Theatrical Companion to Coward. Barry Day and Sheridan Morley (2000 edition, ed.) (second ed.). London: Oberon Books. ISBN 978-1-84002-054-0.
- Morley, Sheridan (1974) A Talent to Amuse, Penguin, London, ISBN 0-14-003863-9
