= Ace of Clubs (musical) =

Musical by Noël Coward

Ace of Clubs is a musical written, composed and directed by Noël Coward. The show is set in a 1949 London nightclub called "The Ace of Clubs". A nightclub singer, Pinkie Leroy, falls in love with a sailor. Pinkie and her lover get mixed up with gangsters, a lost package and a missing diamond necklace. In the end, the police arrest the perpetrators, and Pinkie gets her man.

The musical premiered at the Palace Theatre, Manchester, in May 1950 and played in Liverpool and Birmingham before opening in the West End at the Cambridge Theatre in July. It ran there for 211 performances, receiving mixed to positive reviews. The cast included Pat Kirkwood, Sylvia Cecil, Graham Payn, Jean Carson and Myles Eason. Despite its modest run, Ace of Clubs contained several songs that survived independently, in Coward's later cabaret acts and elsewhere, including "Sail Away" and "I Like America". A CD of the original London cast recording was released in 2004.

A revival played in 1999 at the New Wimbledon Theatre.

== Background ==
After the Second World War Coward strove for a time to regain his pre-war popularity. His 1945 revue Sigh No More ran for only 213 performances in the West End, and the failure of his musical Pacific 1860 in 1946–47 was in contrast to the success of the show that followed it at Drury Lane, Rodgers and Hammerstein's Oklahoma!, which ran for more than ten times as long. (Note: Pacific 1860 ran for 129 performances; Oklahoma! ran for 1,543 performances, the second-longest West End run for a musical to that date, second only to Chu Chin Chow.) Ace of Clubs was one of several other less successful Coward works of the period.

== Premieres ==
The musical premiered at the Palace Theatre, Manchester, on 16 May 1950, followed by more tryouts at the Liverpool Empire Theatre and the Birmingham Alhambra Theatre. It transferred to the Cambridge Theatre, London, on 7 July 1950, where it ran for 211 performances until 6 January 1951. The cast included Pat Kirkwood, Sylvia Cecil, Graham Payn, Jean Carson and Myles Eason. Mantovani was the musical director and, together with Ronald Binge, orchestrated the score. Settings and costume designs were by Gladys Calthrop; it was the twenty-second and last Coward show she designed.

Despite the modesty of its run Ace of Clubs contained several songs that survived independently, in Coward's later cabaret acts and elsewhere. They include "Sail Away" and "I Like America". A CD drawn from the original London cast recording was released in 2004. (Note: The original cast album (HMV C7796–7797) comprised: "Nothing Can Last Forever" (Cecil); "I'd Never, Never Know" (Kirkwood); "There's Something About a Sailor" (Payn); "My Kind of Man" (Kirkwood); "This Could be True" (Kirkwood and Payn); "Josephine" (Kirkwood); "Sail Away" (Payn); "Why Does Love Get in the Way?" (Kirkwood); "In a Boat on the Lake" (Kirkwood and Payn); "Chase Me, Charlie" (Kirkwood); "Evening in Summer" (Cecil) and "I Like America" (Payn). "Three Juvenile Delinquents" (Tuddenham, Kemble and Warwick) was also recorded and issued coupled with Coward's own performance of "Josephine". The CD reissue added recordings by Coward of "Josephine", "Why Does Love Get in the Way?", "I Like America" and "Sail Away") "Three Juvenile Delinquents" was given at charity fundraising shows in 1953, performed by Laurence Olivier, John Gielgud and John Mills and in 1956 by Olivier, Mills and Danny Kaye. Four numbers from Ace of Clubs were used in the 1972 Coward compilation revue Cowardy Custard, with a fifth added for a 2011 revival.

== Cast ==
- Elaine – Bubbly Rogers
- Rita Marbury – Sylvia Cecil
- Benny Lucas – Raymond Young
- Sammy Blake – Robb Stewart
- Felix Fulton – Myles Eason
- Ace of Clubs Girls:

- Dawn O'Hara – Sylvia Verney
- Doreen Harvey – Margaret Miles
- Sunny Claire – June Whitfield
- Ruby Fowler – Erica Yorke
- Greta Hughes – Pamela Devis
- Betty Clements – Lorna Drewes
- Mimi Joshua – Vivien Merchant
- June April – Lisbeth Kearns
- Baby Belgrave – Jean Carson

- Hercules Brothers – Victor Harman, Ronald Francis, Stanley Howlett
- Joseph Snyder – Elwyn Brook-Jones
- Gus – Patrick Westwood
- Pinkie Leroy – Pat Kirkwood
- Harry Hornby – Graham Payn
- Clarice – Eileen Tatler
- Eva – Renee Hill
- Yvonne Hall – Jean Inglis
- Mavis Dean – Gail Kendall
- Detective-Inspector Warrilove – Jack Lambert
- Policeman – Michael Darbyshire
- Mr Price – Philip Rose
- Mrs Price – Stella White
- Juvenile delinquents – Peter Tuddenham, Colin Kemball, Norman Warwick
- First plain-clothes Man – Manfred Priestley
- Second plain-clothes Man – Christopher Calthrop
- Drummer – Don Fitz Stanford
- Waiters – George Selfe, Richard Gill, Jacques Gautier

Night club habitués and visitors

Source: Theatrical Companion to Coward.

== Synopsis ==
Benny runs the Soho nightclub "The Ace of Clubs" for the owner, Rita. Felix, the compère, introduces the club's girls, who perform their opening number. Benny plans the pickup of a parcel with a gangster, Smiling Snyder. The parcel is in the cloakroom wrapped in a raincoat. When Snyder forcibly steals a kiss from Pinkie Leroy, the club's star, in the middle of her act, a sailor named Harry punches Snyder, who draws his gun and fires. Pinkie takes the raincoat to cover her skimpy costume and escapes with Harry.

Harry and Pinkie discover the parcel in the raincoat, but it falls out and Harry finds it after Pinkie goes back to the club. Benny is already looking for the missing parcel, and Rita, who is in love with him, realises that Benny is involved with the gangsters. At rehearsal the next afternoon, Harry comes by to see Pinkie. Detective-lnspector Warrilove arrives to investigate a jewel robbery and shooting. He suspects Snyder. Benny discourages Pinkie from becoming involved with Harry. That evening Snyder and his associate, Gus, kidnap Harry during the show, but he escapes. Pinkie, afraid for Harry's safety, promises Benny that she will get the parcel. Harry is hidden, and after Benny leaves, he and Pinkie meet.

The next day, Harry return with the parcel, suggesting that they give it to the police. Pinkie disagrees, and they argue. That evening, one of the girls mistakes the parcel for her birthday present and opens it, finding the purloined necklace. Snyder and Gus pick up the parcel in exchange for cash. Rita hears that the stolen necklace has been traced to the club. She asks the gangsters to leave. In the club, Warrilove notices the necklace, which the birthday girl is wearing, and he follows her. Snyder and Gus open the parcel to find the birthday present, a pair of falsies. They return to the club, and Warrilove catches them. All ends happily for Benny and Rita as well as Pinkie and Harry.

== Musical numbers ==
Act 1

- "Top of the Morning" – Baby and Ace of Clubs Girls
- "My Kind of Man" – Pinkie
- "This Could be True" – Pinkie and Harry
- "Nothing Can Last For Ever" – Rita
- "Something About a Sailor" – Harry
- "I'd Never, Never Know" – Pinkie
- "Three Juvenile Delinquents" – Juvenile Delinquents
- "Sail Away" – Harry
- "Josephine" – Pinkie
- Reprise: "My Kind of Man" – Pinkie
- "Would You Like to Stick a Pin in my Balloon?" – Ace of Clubs Girls

Act 2

- "In a Boat on a Lake with My Darling" – Sextet
- "I Like America" – Harry and Ace of Clubs Girls
- "Why Does Love Get in the Way?" – Pinkie
- "Three Juvenile Delinquents" Juvenile Delinquents
- "Evening in Summer" – Rita
- Reprise: "Sail Away" – Harry
- *Time for Baby's Bottle" – Baby, Yvonne, Mavis
- "Chase Me, Charlie" – Pinkie
- Reprise: "Nothing Can Last For Ever" – Rita
- Reprise: "My Kind of Man" – Pinkie

Source: Theatrical Companion to Coward.

The original draft of the piece included "Three Theatrical Dames", a comic trio for three men in drag as grandes dames of the stage. It was dropped from Ace of Clubs before the opening but was used at charity fundraising performances such as The Night of 100 Stars, sung in 1956 by Peter Ustinov, Laurence Harvey and Paul Scofield.

== Critical reaction ==
When the piece opened in Manchester the reviewer in The Manchester Evening News wrote:

Let it be said at once of Noël Coward's Ace of Clubs that the difference between this and all the other musical plays is that only one man in the theatre could have fashioned it. Once again he has given us a book and lyrics that are always clever and often witty; a sufficient number of songs either sentimentally haunting or funny; and one or two ribald little impertinences – just to prove that you can laugh at anything if only you are Noël Coward.

The Times thought that Coward had striven too hard for popular success with his score: "In spite of the mixed reception it is possible that Ace of Clubs, for all its crudity and its slightly old-fashioned air, will give a great many people what they consider lively entertainment. But Mr Coward’s usual public will feel that he has temporarily deserted them." The Manchester Guardian was more favourable, calling the show "essentially a good-tempered frolic ... unlikely to knock spots off Oklahoma but it is in essence not only more genial, but more intelligent." It praised Coward's protégé Graham Payn, who "dances with consummate grace ... singularly fresh and boyish", adding, whether innocently or not, "Benevolent Uncle Noel has found a first-class nephew".

== Revival ==
The show was revived in 1999 at the New Wimbledon Theatre. The Stage found it a "dazzling revival" and commented that it was hard to understand why the original run had not been longer.

== Notes, references and sources ==
=== Sources ===
- Mander, Raymond; Joe Mitchenson (1957). Theatrical Companion to Coward (first ed.). London: Rockliffe. OCLC 1336174067.
- Mander, Raymond; Joe Mitchenson (2000). Theatrical Companion to Coward. Barry Day and Sheridan Morley (second ed.). London: Oberon Books. ISBN 978-1-84002-054-0.
