= Set to Music =

Musical revue with sketches and songs by Noël Coward

- Page from sheet music (cropped)
- Music: Noël Coward
- Lyrics: Noël Coward
- Productions: 1939 Broadway

Set to Music is a musical revue with sketches, music and lyrics by Noël Coward.

Produced by John C. Wilson, the Broadway production opened on January 15, 1939 at the Music Box Theatre, where it ran for 129 performances. Directed by Coward, the revue starred Beatrice Lillie.

This show originated in 1932 under the title of Words and Music, with a London production at the Adelphi Theatre. It consisted of a series of sketches, some with songs. Seven years later, it was revised for Broadway as Set to Music. The song "Mad Dogs and Englishmen", one of Coward's best-known songs, was dropped, and four new songs were added. The sketches included "A Fragonard Impression", and "Midnight Matinée".

== Sketches ==
Beatrice Lillie sang a parody about being a successful singer in "Rug of Persia" while "weaving an oriental arras." The song ends with a reference to the popular Cole Porter song "My Heart Belongs to Daddy". Playing an actress who becomes progressively more drunk, Lillie sang "I Went to a Marvellous Party". Lillie played Mrs. John Illsworth-Poindexter in the sketch "Madame Dines Alone", leading into the song "Never Again". She was also The Countess in a railway station with Sarah Burton, Kenneth Carton, Victor Cutrar, Ray Dennis, Sanders Draper, Hugh French, Gladys Henson, Robert Shackelton, and Gilbert Wilson in "Secret Service."

Maidie Andrews was La Marquise De Sauriole while Richard Haydn appeared as Edwin Carp, a fish mimic in a mad vaudeville act ("Fish Mimicry"). John Hopper Mathews played the minor role of Lady Patricia Gainton.

== Songs ==
- The Stately Homes of England (from Operette) - Kenneth Carton, Hugh French, Angus Menzies, Anthony Pelissier
- Never Again
- The Party's Over Now
- Three Little Débutantes
- Mad About the Boy - Beatrice Lillie (as a schoolgirl), Laura Duncan (A Girl of the Town), Gladys Henson (A Housemaid), Moya Nugent (School Girl's Younger Sister), Rosemary Lomax (Society Woman's Friend)
- I Went to a Marvellous Party‡ - Beatrice Lillie
- Children of the Ritz
- (I'm So) Weary of It All ‡ - Beatrice Lillie (as Marion Day), Ray Dennis
- Rug of Persia ‡ - Beatrice Lillie
- Three White Feathers ‡ - Beatrice Lillie

‡ this number was not included in Words and Music

The Noël Coward Society's website, drawing on performing statistics from the publishers and the Performing Rights Society, names "Mad About the Boy" as Coward's most popular song. "The Stately Homes of England" (originally from Coward's Operette) was also among the top ten most performed Coward songs. "The Party's Over Now" and "...Marvellous Party" rank in the top thirty Coward songs.
