= Binkie Beaumont =

British theatre manager (1908-1973)

- Beaumont, 1933
- Born: Hughes Griffiths Morgan; 27 March 1908; Hampstead, London, England
- Died: 22 March 1973 (aged 64); Lord North Street, Westminster, London
- Education: Penarth Grammar School, Penarth, Vale of Glamorgan, Wales
- Occupations: Theatre manager and producer
- Parents: Morgan Morgan (father); Mary Frances Brewer (mother)

Hugh "Binkie" Beaumont (27 March 1908 – 22 March 1973) was a British theatre manager and producer, sometimes referred to as the "éminence grise" of the West End theatre. Though he shunned the spotlight so that his name was not known widely among the general public, he was one of the most successful and influential manager-producers in the West End during the middle of the 20th century.

Beaumont was brought up in Cardiff, where he joined the staff of a local theatre at the age of fifteen. From there he built a career in theatrical management. His company, H. M. Tennent, which he co-founded in 1936, was based at the old Globe Theatre (now the Gielgud Theatre) in Shaftesbury Avenue, London. His success was based on lavish productions, starry casts and plays calculated to appeal to a West End audience. Among those with whom he was closely associated were Noël Coward and John Gielgud. His successes included new plays, revivals of classics, and musicals.

With the rise of state-subsidised theatre and avant-garde plays from the mid-1950s onwards, Beaumont's genre of opulent productions of safe repertoire started to seem conventional. He recognised this by serving on the board of the new National Theatre during the last decade of his life.

== Life and career ==
=== Early years ===
Throughout his life Beaumont was evasive about his background, given, as one biographer wrote, "to disseminating fanciful accounts of his origins". It was not until a 1989 biography by Richard Huggett that the facts became widely known. He was born Hughes Griffiths Morgan, in Hampstead, London, the son of Morgan Morgan, a barrister, and his wife Mary Frances, née Brewer. Morgan divorced his wife for adultery when the boy was two. Mary Morgan then married the co-respondent, William Sugden Beaumont, a Cardiff timber merchant, whom the young Beaumont was brought up believing to be his real father. The boy was formally known as Hugh, but was generally called "Binkie". The origin of his nickname is uncertain; John Elsom in a 1991 book Cold War Theatre suggests that "Binkie" was Cardiff slang for a black child or a ragamuffin. William Beaumont died while Binkie was still a boy. Mary Beaumont then let rooms to a lodger, Major Harry Woodcock, a former Army Entertainments Officer and latterly general manager of the Cardiff Playhouse.

At the age of fifteen Beaumont left Penarth Grammar School and became a box-office assistant at the Playhouse; he was appointed assistant manager of the Prince of Wales Theatre in Cardiff a year later. He was subsequently business manager for Aubrey Smith's touring company and then of the Barnes Theatre in London for the producer Philip Ridgeway. The Barnes Theatre was famous for its productions of Chekhov and the other Russian classics, often directed by Theodore Komisarjevsky. During Beaumont's time with the company five of its productions transferred to the West End, giving him valuable managerial experience in five West End theatres. During his time with Ridgeway, Beaumont met John Gielgud for the first time.

=== Tennent's ===
Beaumont was appointed assistant to Harry Tennent, a senior executive in the Moss Empires theatre chain. In 1933 Tennent engineered the creation of a joint-booking company – which lasted three years – for Moss Empires and Howard & Wyndham and became general manager. Tennent and Beaumont were unimpressed by the quality of many shows offered by producers for staging in the two groups' theatres. At Beaumont's instigation, he and Tennent went into production and management on their own account in 1936, setting up H M Tennent Limited. Tennent concentrated on the business side of the enterprise, with Beaumont as the producer, choosing plays and engaging directors, actors and designers.

Their first production, The Ante Room, by Kate O'Brien at the Queen's Theatre in 1936, was a failure. The firm suffered a series of further flops, running short of capital before finding success with the 1937 production of Gerald Savory's George and Margaret, which ran for 799 performances. This was followed by Dodie Smith's Dear Octopus (373 performances) and other long-running shows that established Tennent as a highly profitable concern. When the Chamberlain government closed all the theatres in Britain on the outbreak of the Second World War in 1939, Beaumont had enough clout to persuade the prime minister to cancel the closures less than a week later.

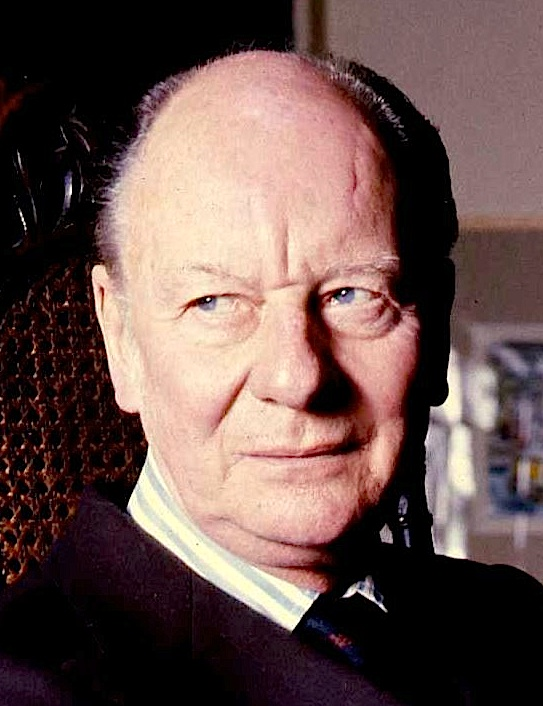
John Gielgud

Tennent died in 1941, leaving Beaumont in sole control, and for the next twenty years he was one of the most powerful men in British theatre. He maintained a low profile, shunning the limelight partly from natural reticence (saying, "I haven't the temperament to be a Cochran or a Diaghilev") and partly from his belief that he could operate more effectively behind the scenes. The first full-length biography of Beaumont, published in 1989, is subtitled "éminence grise of the West End theatre, 1933–1973".

Beaumont gained a strong commercial advantage over his rivals by setting up a subsidiary company to present classic plays: he successfully maintained that this operation qualified as "educational", and was thus exempt from tax. With productions such as The Importance of Being Earnest, with Gielgud and Edith Evans, and Hamlet, with Gielgud and Peggy Ashcroft, Beaumont made large profits from this ostensibly charitable enterprise. Gielgud was a strong influence on Beaumont's aesthetic development, and they maintained a mutually beneficial association which survived despite a personal crisis when Gielgud's then partner John Perry fell for and moved in with Beaumont. Perry remained personally and professionally involved with Beaumont for the rest of the latter's life, and all three remained on close terms. Another close associate was Noël Coward. In his play Present Laughter, he caricatured himself and his friends, including Beaumont, portrayed as "Henry Lyppiatt", the shrewd man of business. Despite the heavy entertainment tax paid on productions by the main Tennent organisation, Beaumont made substantial profits from such new plays as Coward's Blithe Spirit, which ran for 1,997 performances.

=== Postwar ===
Beaumont was always careful to balance innovation and box-office appeal. He combined both in the London premiere of Oklahoma! in 1947, which ran at Drury Lane for 1,543 performances. He promoted the works of new dramatists, including Christopher Fry, Tennessee Williams, and later Robert Bolt and Peter Shaffer, and engaged promising young directors and performers including Peter Brook and Richard Burton.

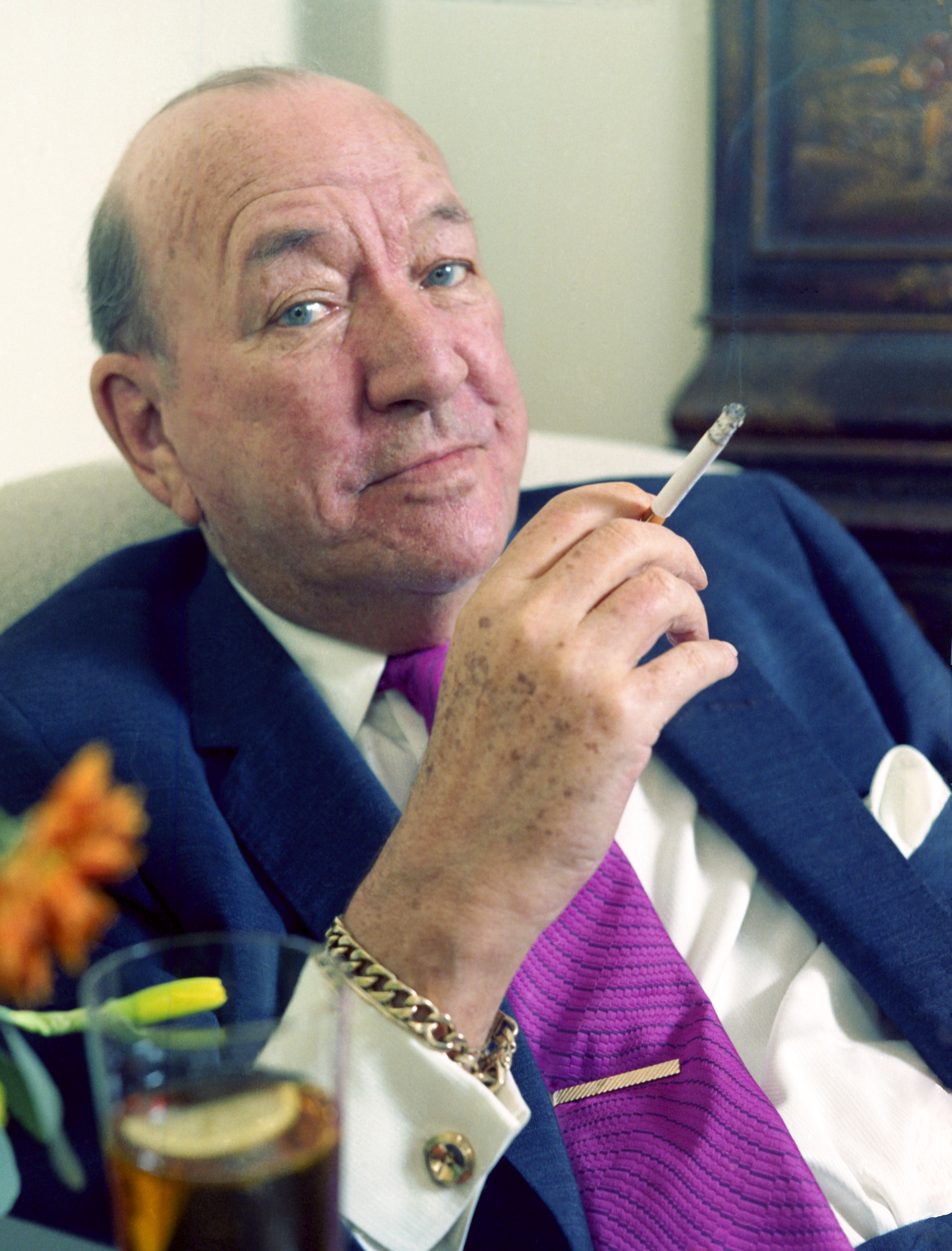
Noël Coward

The rise of state-subsidised theatre, and the emergence of kitchen sink drama undermined Beaumont's pre-eminence beginning in the 1950s. He disapproved of both, and stuck to his style of lavish, starry West End productions, even when they began to go out of fashion. He alienated both Coward and Terence Rattigan with his arrogant and sometimes duplicitous behaviour. Beaumont attempted to sabotage the former's new play Waiting in the Wings by telling him that the actresses Coward wanted to cast refused to play in it, whereas in reality Beaumont had not consulted them. He continued to have enormous successes: in 1958, he presented the first British productions of both West Side Story (1040 performances) and My Fair Lady (2281 performances). The latter cost an unprecedented sum to stage, but, thanks to a sustained publicity campaign by Tennent's, advance bookings meant that the show was in net profit two months before it opened.

Beaumont sufficiently overcame his suspicion of the subsidised theatre to be a founder member of the board of the National Theatre, on which he served with energy and commitment during the last ten years of his life. He also continued to run H M Tennent until his death. His last production for Tennent's was a 1973 revival of Maugham's The Constant Wife, starring Ingrid Bergman, directed by Gielgud, which opened after Beaumont's death.

Beaumont died at his house in Lord North Street, Westminster, at the age of 64.
