= H. M. Tennent =

British songwriter (1879–1941)

H.M. Tennent
- Born: Henry Moncrieff Tennent; 18 February 1879; England
- Died: 10 June 1941 (aged 62)
- Occupations: Theatre producer; theatre owner/manager; impresario; songwriter

Henry Moncrieff Tennent (18 February 1879 – 10 June 1941), was a British theatrical producer, impresario and songwriter. From 1929 to 1933, he mentored Binkie Beaumont, having previously worked with him in Cardiff. When Tennent, already the general manager at the Theatre Royal, Drury Lane, and a senior executive with Moss Empires, persuaded the boards of Moss Empires and of Howard & Wyndham to co-operate, in order the better to produce theatre drama, it was Tennent and Beaumont who became the chief executives of a new shared company H. M. Tennent Ltd. The largest and controlling shareholders were the Cruikshank family of Howard & Wyndham founded in Glasgow in 1895 and headquartered in Edinburgh.

Their first production at the Queen's Theatre in 1936 was a failure, but later that year they formalised their partnership as the production company 'H. M. Tennent Ltd', with offices on the top floor of the Globe Theatre (now the Gielgud), and went on to great success. On Tennent's death of a heart attack in 1941, Beaumont found he was unmentioned in Tennent's will, but nevertheless took over as managing director of the company.
