= Pacific 1860 =

Musical

Pacific 1860 is a musical written by Noël Coward. The story is set in a fictional Pacific British colony during the reign of Queen Victoria. It involves a romantic and sentimental story about a visiting prima donna and her conflict between love and career. There is also the theme of snobbishness from the island's establishment.

The original London production opened in 1946, starring Mary Martin, opposite Graham Payn and played for four months. It was the first show to play at the Theatre Royal, Drury Lane after World War II. A cast recording, originally on 78 rpm discs was transferred to CD and has been called pleasant but old fashioned. The piece was not played in the U.S. until 2003, when it was given a concert staging Off-Broadway by York Theatre Company, directed by Simon Jones, who also played the Governor/narrator of the piece.

== History ==
The musical premiered at the Theatre Royal, Drury Lane in London on 19 December 1946 and was the first post-war production by Coward. The show was not a success and ran for only four months, closing on 12 April 1947 The lead role of Elena Salvador was taken by Mary Martin, and the other principal actors included Coward's lover Graham Payn as Kerry Stirling, Sylvia Cecil as Rosa Cariatanza, and Winifred Ingram as Trudi. Sets and costumes were designed by Coward's friend and regular designer, Gladys Calthrop.

The Times said of the piece that the island on which it was set was equable in temperature, adding "This mild romance with its abundance of easy theatrical sentiment so gracefully expressed has precisely the same climate, and there are moments, as one pretty song succeeds another, when we rather hanker after a tropical storm." Of the cast, the paper said, "Miss Mary Martin sings the heroine with much assurance and charm, and Mr Graham Payn is fully equal to the demands made on her 'opposite number'." The Manchester Guardian thought the first act fell "entirely flat" and judged the whole show old-fashioned, but praised the cast and the production. The Observer was still less favourable: "This operetta is an orgy of good taste, and people who are nervous of that quality may be comforted by knowing that there is plenty of honest dullness in the very conventional plot."

== Plot summary ==
Act 1

A large family of British plantation owners on the Pacific island of Samolo, the Stirlings, are hosting a party. The father refuses to extend an invitation to a visitor to the island, the young opera singer Elena Salvador, but one of the sons, romantic-minded Kerry, finds this unreasonable, believing that she has been the target of malicious gossip. A carriage accident happens near the Stirlings' home, and Elena is the victim. She and Kerry become acquainted, and he invites her to the party, as they express affection for each other.

Act 2

At the party, the six Stirling daughters and their boyfriends who work at Government House are poking fun at the Governor. The Stirlings withdraw their objections to Elena's presence when they learn that she is a friend of the Governor's wife. Elena and Kerry entertain the guests with a native song, but when she kisses Kerry, in front of the guests, they are scandalised. A week later, at Elena's house her chaperone warns Elena not to fall seriously in love. Sadly, financial considerations force Elena to leave Samolo to resume her career, and both Kerry and Elena are heartbroken.

Act 3

Elena returns a year later to find that it is the wedding day of young Mr. Stirling; she is despondent. But it turns out that it is not Kerry who is getting married, but his practical brother, Rollo; Kerry is the best man. When Kerry finally sees Elena, they fall into each other's arms at once.

== Songs ==
(In the order listed in The Lyrics of Noël Coward, pp. 232–63):

- Family Grace
- If I were a Man
- Dear Madame Salvador
- Hy Horse Has Cast a Shoe
- I Wish I Wasn't Quite Such a Big Girl
- Samolan Song (Ka Tahua)
- Bright was the Day
- Invitation to the Waltz
- His Excellency Regrets
- The Party's Going with a Swing
- Birthday Toast
- Make Way for Their Excellencies
- Fumfumbolo
- One Two Three
- This is a Night for Lovers
- I Never Knew
- This is a Changing World
- Come Back to the Island
- Gipsy Melody
- This is the Night
- Mother's Lament
- Pretty Little Bridesmaids
- I Saw No Shadow
- Wedding Toast
- Uncle Harry

== Roles and cast ==
- Elena Salvador - Mary Martin
- Rosa Cariatanza - Sylvia Cecil
- Trudi - Winefride Ingham
- Mrs Stirling - Maidie Andrews
- Solange - Maria Perilli
- Louise - Ann Martin
- Caroline - Irlin Hall
- Henrietta - Peggy Thompson, (Mrs Peggy Fraser)
- Agnes - Joy O'Neill
- Sarah - Daphne Peretz
- Georgina - Ann Sullivan
- Mrs Cawthorne - Rose Hignell
- Penelope - Daphne Anderson
- Mrs Pelham - Gwen Bateman
- Lady Grayshott - Helen Horsey
- Miss Scobie - Moya Nugent
- Miss Teresa Scobie - Betty Hare
- Primrose Larch - Jacqueline Jones
- Kerry Stirling - Graham Payn
- Rollo - Pat McGrath
- Mr Stirling - Tudor Evans
- Felix Kammer - Carl Jaffe
- His Excellency Sir Lewis Grayshott - Cyril Butcher
- Aden Grayshott - Denis Martin
- D'Arcy Grayshott - John Warwick
