= Olive Gilbert =

British singer and actress (1898–1981)

Olive Sarah Gilbert (22 November 1898 – 19 February 1981) was a British singer and actress, who, in a career spanning seven decades, performed first in opera and then in many of Ivor Novello's musicals in London's West End.

After the First World War, Gilbert sang contralto and mezzo-soprano roles with the Carl Rosa Opera Company for more than a decade. She moved into musical theatre in 1935, appearing in Novello's Glamorous Night. She also had roles in his Careless Rapture (1936), Crest of the Wave (1937), The Dancing Years (1939), Arc de Triomphe (1943), Perchance to Dream (1945) and King's Rhapsody (1949).

From 1961 to 1966, she played Sister Margaretta in The Sound of Music, and she appeared as the housekeeper in Man of La Mancha in 1968. She continued to perform into the 1970s.

== Biography ==
Gilbert was born in Carmarthen, Wales. By 1919, she began her professional career in contralto and mezzo-soprano roles with the Carl Rosa Opera Company, such as Carmen, Delilah, Mignon, Nicklaus and Suzuki. She performed for many years with that company, receiving warm reviews. Of her Fricka in Wagner's The Valkyrie in 1929, The Times wrote, "The greatest individual performance last night was that of Miss Olive Gilbert, who conveyed the cold fury of Fricka in spirited singing which always remained full-toned".

Gilbert debuted in musical theatre in May 1935, in Ivor Novello's Glamorous Night at London's Theatre Royal, Drury Lane. She remained with Novello, taking featured or starring roles in all of his musicals thereafter until his death in 1951. She also acted as his personal assistant and housekeeper, living in the flat below his. At Drury Lane, she starred in Novello's Careless Rapture (1936), Crest of the Wave (1937) and The Dancing Years (1939). She was the contralto voice in the unusual female duet from The Dancing Years, "The Wings of Sleep". Mary Ellis sang the soprano part. She later repeated the role of Frau Kurt in the 1950 film adaptation of The Dancing Years.

Next, Gilbert appeared in his musical Arc de Triomphe (1943) at the Phoenix Theatre, Perchance to Dream (1945) at the London Hippodrome, and King's Rhapsody (1949) at the Palace Theatre. One of her most famous performances was in the long-running Perchance to Dream, in which she sang "We'll Gather Lilacs in the Spring". She sang the song at Novello's cremation.

In 1961 at the Palace Theatre, she first played Sister Margaretta in The Sound of Music, remaining in that show for its entire five-year London run. She played the housekeeper in Man of La Mancha in 1968 at the Piccadilly Theatre. In the early 1970s, she toured in Bless the Bride, as Ernestine in Perchance to Dream, and as Countess Vera in King's Rhapsody.

Gilbert died in 1981, in Hove, Sussex, at the age of 82.
