= Ivy Tresmand =

English soubrette

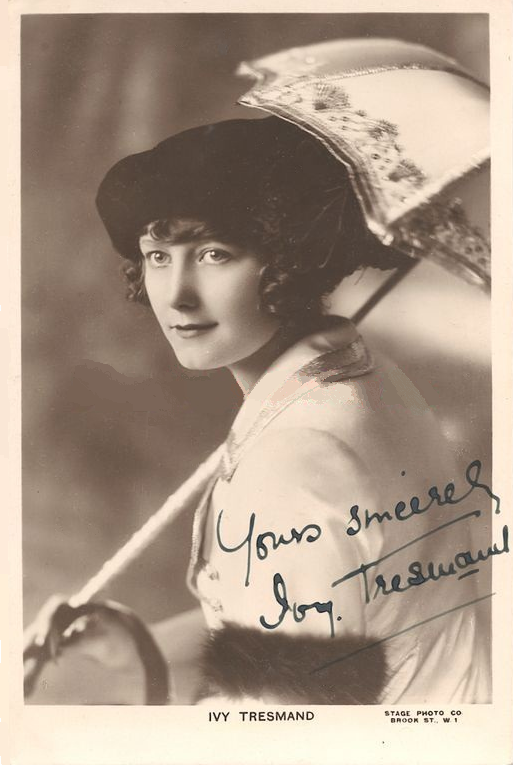
Ivy Tresmand, portrait by Stage Photo Co. ca. 1919

Ivy Tresmand (15 December 1898 – 2 November 1980) was an English soubrette who appeared mostly in musical theatre.

== Career ==
Tresmand was born in London. Her earliest appearances were in the chorus of the revue Shell Out (1915), in the musicals Houp La! (1916–1917) and Betty, and in the revue Bubbly.

In 1922 Tresmand won the leading role of Tina in a West End revival of the Broadway show The Red Mill. She was in the revue Just Fancy and followed May Beatty as Margot in Sybil. In 1923 she was in The Merry Widow at Daly's Theatre. She continued to play in musicals through the 1920s and early 1930s. In 1936 she took the leading role of Penelope Lee in Ivor Novello's Careless Rapture (1936), remaining with the show while it was on tour and at the Prince's Theatre, Bristol, in 1937–38. She had a part on screen in the film The Dark Stairway (1938).

After appearing with Leslie Henson in Going Greek and Swing Along in South Africa, she settled there, continuing to take part in concerts and plays. She died in South Africa in 1980.

== Artistic recognition ==
Tresmand's portrait was painted in oils by the Australian artist William Longstaff (1879–1953). She eventually presented the picture to the City of Johannesburg Africana Museum.
