= Perchance to Dream (musical) =

Musical by Ivor Novello

- Music: Ivor Novello
- Lyrics: Ivor Novello
- Book: Ivor Novello
- Productions: 1945 West End, 2011 Finborough Theatre, London

Perchance to Dream is a musical romance with book, lyrics and music by Ivor Novello. It was the only musical for which Novello wrote lyrics. The title is a quotation from William Shakespeare's play Hamlet. The plot, like many of Novello's plots, is a romantic adventure tale, telling the parallel stories of the fates of several inhabitants of the same house through differing time periods. The stories interconnect and have unforeseen repercussions, one upon the other.

It opened on the London stage at the Hippodrome Theatre on 21 April 1945. The show starred Novello as Sir Graham, Valentine Fayre and Bay Fayre; Margaret Rutherford as Lady Charlotte Fayre; Olive Gilbert as Ernestine Flavelle, later called Mrs. Bridport; Roma Beaumont as Melinda Fayre, Melanie and Melody; Muriel Barron as Lydia Lyddington, Veronica Lyddington and Iris; and Bobbie Andrews as William Fayre. Zena Dare was a replacement as Lady Charlotte. Sylvia Cecil replaced Muriel Barron during the run. It was directed by Jack Minster, with choreography by Frank Staff and Keith Lester. The musical is one of Novello's most successful works and enjoyed an original run of 1,022 performances (the longest of any of Novello's runs) and finally closed on 11 October 1948. It enjoyed many subsequent tours and revivals. A 2011 revival at the Finborough Theatre, London, was the first professional production since the 1980s. The hit song of the show was "We'll Gather Lilacs".

== Synopsis ==
Act I

During the Regency period, Sir Graham Rodney, an impoverished womaniser, is living off the largess of Lady Charlotte, his rich aunt. He is the owner of a magnificent old Georgian country house, called "Huntersmoon". Lydia Lyddington, a Drury Lane actress, is Sir Graham's lover and lives with him, as does her friend, also an actress. Sir Graham's hated cousin William Fayre covets Huntersmoon and dogs Sir Graham's steps. Sir Graham disguises himself to become the notorious highwayman, "Frenchy", to pay his debts and add excitement to his life of leisure. He robs a coach and takes a necklace but finds that the coach contains Lady Fayre and her ward Melinda. They soon meet at Huntersmoon, and he falls in love with Melinda. He dies in Melinda's arms after being shot in another highway robbery gone wrong, telling Melinda that they will find each other again in another life, and leaving Lydia pregnant. Huntersmoon devolves to William and some unhappy ghosts.

Act II

More than three decades later, in the early Victorian era, William's son, Valentine Fayre, owns Huntersmoon. He is a composer to Queen Victoria. He marries Veronica Lyddington, the illegitimate daughter of the late Sir Graham and Lydia. They live amidst the ghosts of their predecessors. Valentine meets Melanie, Sir Graham's niece; they fall in love and plan to run away together, but Veronica reveals that she is pregnant. Valentine is in despair when Melanie commits suicide.

Act III

In 1945, Valentine's grandson, Bay Fayre, wins the hand of Melody, the girl who represents the love that he had lost in earlier generations. The romance finally lays the ghosts to rest and all ends happily.

== Songs ==
- "When the Gentlemen Get Together" –
- "Love is My Reason" –
- "The Meeting" –
- "The Path My Lady Walks" –
- "A Lady Went to Market Fair" –
- "When I Curtsied to the King" –
- "Highwayman Love" –
- "The Triumph of Spring" (Ballet) –
- "Autumn Lullaby" –
- "A Woman's Heart" –
- "We'll Gather Lilacs" –
- "The Victorian Wedding" –
- "The Glo-Glo" –
- "The Elopement" –
- "Ghost Finale" –
