= Leontine Sagan =

Austrian-Hungarian theatre director and actress (1889–1974)

- Born: Leontine Schlesinger; 13 February 1889; Budapest, Austria-Hungary
- Died: 20 May 1974 (aged 85); Pretoria, South Africa
- Occupations: Theatre director; actress
- Spouse: Victor Fleischer

Leontine Sagan (born Leontine Schlesinger; 13 February 1889 – 20 May 1974) was a theatre director and actress of Jewish descent, whose life and career took her from the Austro-Hungarian Empire to South Africa, Britain and the United States. She is best known for directing a film, Mädchen in Uniform (1931), which has been celebrated for its scathing indictment of Prussian military-style schooling, as well as its sensitive portrayal of same-sex intimacy between a teacher and a student at a girls' school, in the waning years of Germany's Weimar Republic.

Sagan was born in Budapest but grew up in South Africa. After returning to Vienna to attend Max Reinhardt's Theatre School in Vienna, she acted on Austrian provincial stages, and moved on to major roles in Dresden, Frankfurt and Berlin, where she also directed theatre, first in Germany and, after she had to flee Hitler, in Britain, South Africa, and Australia. She co-founded the National Theatre Organisation of South Africa in 1947, and died in Pretoria, South Africa in 1974, at the age of 85.

== Personal life ==
Born in Budapest in 1889, Sagan spent her early childhood in Vienna at a time when these cities were the twin centers of the Austro-Hungarian Empire. Her father Isidore Schlesinger was largely absent, as he travelled to seek fortune in the South African diamond fields. Leontine and her siblings were raised by a mother who worked, a rarity among educated Europeans at that time, and she credits her mother with inspiring her likewise to seek a career. In 1899, as a child, she and her family moved to South Africa to join her father, just before the Second Boer War, when they settled in Doornfontein, at the time a fashionable district in Johannesburg. She was educated in the German School and later worked for the Austrian consulate in Johannesburg.

After returning to Vienna to study with the famous director Max Reinhardt, Leontine adopted the stage name Sagan and acted on stage first in Austrian provincial theatres and then in the 1910s and 1920s in Vienna, Frankfurt and Berlin. In 1916, she married Austrian art publisher and writer Dr. Victor Fleischer. Fleeing Germany after Hitler came to power in 1933, the pair moved to Britain, and later, in 1939, to South Africa, where they spent the years of World War II (1939–1945). After the war, Sagan directed theatre abroad in Britain and Australia, but remained domiciled in South Africa, where she founded the National Theatre Organisation and also taught theatre practice to black as well as white students.

Despite her long marriage to Fleischer, who died in South Africa in 1950, Sagan expressed interest in lesbian themes and characters throughout her career as an actor and director, before and after making Mädchen in Uniform. This film and Sagan's choice to play the role of the teacher in English versions of the original stage play, variously titled Girls in Uniform and Children in Uniform, in Britain and South Africa in the 1930s, as well as her taste for masculine dress as seen in the photographs illustrating her autobiography Lights and Shadows, suggests at least a commitment to representing lesbian lives and loves, if not also personal attachments to women.

== Career ==
Supported by her mother and savings from working in the Austrian consulate in Johannesburg, Leontine moved to Vienna in 1911 to train with Max Reinhardt, who was already known for elaborate and imaginative sets and direction of intimate drama and mass spectacles, as well as his theatre school. After acting in small roles in provincial Austrian theatres, Sagan moved to Germany, where she played Abel in Comrades by August Strindberg in the Munich Kammerspiele. This role in a play by a controversial modern playwright led to an engagement at the Albert Theatre in Dresden, where Sagan played Nasya in Maxim Gorky's The Lower Depths in 1913, and at the avant-garde Neues Theater in Frankfurt am Main, during World War I, where Sagan originated roles in expressionist plays by Walter Hasenclever and Georg Kaiser. After the war, she played major parts at the Frankfurter Schauspielhaus, in classical German plays by Goethe and Schiller, as well as the lead in a historical drama on Catherine the Great. She appeared in films such as The Holy Mountain (1926), The Great Leap (1927), and The White Ecstasy (1930). At the Schauspielhaus she also turned to directing, including Strindberg's Ghost Sonata, and G.B. Shaw's Caeser and Cleopatra. as well as plays on topical Jewish themes such as anti-Jewish pogroms in Die Jagd Gottes (Hunted by God), by the Rabbi Emil Bernhardt Cohn, which proved controversial. Sagan's decision to play the lesbian Countess Geschwitz in Frank Wedekind's play Pandora's Box in 1919 (but not in the later film version of Pandora's Box [1929]), early in her career at the Schauspielhaus, reflected not only her interest in lesbian subjects, but also the relative tolerance in the Weimar Republic of lives and institutions which today would be identified as LGBTQ+, including the Institute for Sexology (1919–1933) as well as informal groups.

Although best known for her film Mädchen in Uniform, Sagan came to film directing indirectly. In 1931, she directed Gestern und Heute [Yesterday and Today], a play about an intimate relationship between a teacher and a student at a girls school, by the avowed lesbian Christa Winsloe. On Winsloe's recommendation, the feminist Hertha Thiele played the role of the student and caught the attention of Carl Fröhlich, head of the German Film Chamber. Although Fröhlich maintained overall control as artistic supervisor and changed the title to Mädchen in Uniform, allegedly to attract more male viewers, Sagan cast and directed the actors, including Thiele and, in the role of the teacher, Dorothea Wieck. Sagan's direction of the all-female cast was ground-breaking not only for its portrayal of lesbian and pedagogical eros and for its critique of Prussian militarism, but also for the production's co-operative and profit-sharing financial arrangements. The film was a national and international hit, despite some censorious responses in the U.S. and Britain. After the war, a more sentimental remake, also titled Mädchen in Uniform, starring Romy Schneider, appeared in 1958, but from the 1970s, renewed interest in lesbian lives and culture at women's film festivals brought viewers back to the 1931 original.

After Hitler's rise to power, Sagan moved to England. While her husband Victor Fleischer continued until 1938 to manage his publishing house in Vienna, Sagan directed stage plays, in 1933 first a stage version of Mädchen in Uniform called Girls in Uniform in London, and then in South Africa with the perhaps less controversial title Children in Uniform. Her reputation as a director of young people led to work with the Oxford University Dramatic Society, with whom she directed male students and professional actresses in plays by Shakespeare. Her observations of student rivalries at Oxford inspired the script for her second film Men of Tomorrow (1934), which Sagan directed for London Film Productions, but this film has since vanished. It was on the strength of Mädchen in Uniform that Sagan was invited to Hollywood by MGM studios, where she stayed for six months in 1936, describing the period as a "joyride". While writing treatments, she renewed contact with former colleagues who had found work in Hollywood such as screenwriter Salka Viertel, whom Sagan had known as Salome Sara Steuermann when they were both acting in Austria. Although Sagan wrote several treatments, among them one for a fictional film on the South African imperialist Cecil John Rhodes, she had no success in persuading MGM, possibly because Salka's husband, the director Berthold Viertel, had already directed a Rhodes biopic for Gaumont in Britain. Sagan's treatments based on historical women, such as Florence Nightingale, were likewise unsuccessful.

Instead, Sagan returned to acclaim in the London theatre; she was the first woman to produce plays at London's Drury Lane in the West End, where she directed Ivor Novello's hit musicals Glamorous Night (1935), Careless Rapture (1936), Crest of the Wave (1937), The Dancing Years (1939) and Arc de Triomphe (1943). Novello's popularity and Sagan's directing flair have been credited with saving Drury Lane from potential closure in the 1930s. In 1939 with the outbreak of World War II, Sagan and Fleischer moved to South Africa, where she directed mostly amateur actors but also taught black students at the Hofmeyr School fo Social Work, including later famous people such as the creator of the township musical Gibson Kente. After the war, she returned to directing Novello in London and to take his and other musicals on tour to Australia. Between tours, she was also able to develop theatre in South Africa by co-founding with Andre Huguenet the National Theatre Organisation which toured the country from its base in Pretoria. In February 1948 she directed the NTO's first English production Dear Brutus by J.M. Barrie, followed by J.B Priestley's An Inspector Calls.

== Filmography ==
Mädchen in Uniform (1931) featured an all-female cast and was the first film in Germany to be produced cooperatively (both the crew and cast obtained shares rather than a salary). It is based on the play originally titled Ritter Nerestan by Christa Winsloe. The film, like the play which Sagan directed as Gestern und Heute in 1931, centers on a girls' boarding school, which was realistically depicted and shot on location at a school, albeit at one for boys. In the film, the school is ruled by a strict Prussian headmistress but, where Winsloe's play has the student who has fallen in love with her teacher commit suicide by throwing herself down the stairwell, Sagan revised the plot. In Mädchen in Uniform, the solidarity and intervention from fellow students saves Manuela's life; this revised story critique the Prussian education system, in favor of the more liberal systems of the Weimar Republic. But it is as a lesbian classic and more broadly as a feminist film, that Mädchen in Uniform has been praised since the 1970s.

The elements that make Mädchen in Uniform a lesbian classic are not the titillating images that might be implied by the title, which was in any case chosen by producer Fröhlich—girls holding hands, dressing and undressing, and so on—but rather Sagan's sensitive and sophisticated direction of talented actors, the avowedly feminist Hertha Thiele as the student Manuela, and the more subtle contribution of Dorothea Wieck as the teacher Fräulein von Bernberg. Manuela develops a crush on Fräulein von Bernberg, and the film shows the budding attraction between them in shots and reverse shots of the central characters without any explicit declarations. Manuela confesses her love publicly only after she plays the eponymous hero of Friedrich Schiller's classic play Don Carlos, a historical tragedy in which the young prince falls in love with his stepmother while also struggling to prepare for his future role as monarch. While Winsloe originally chose the Hungarian romance Der Ritter Nérestan as the play within her play, Sagan's substitution of Don Carlos gave Thiele a script that allowed Manuela's declaration to criticize authoritarian rule and by extension the repressive school regime, as well as to express her love to her teacher. The headmistress forbids Fräulein von Bernburg to see or speak to Manuela again but, when Manuela attempts suicide, the other girls rally around her and save her life, while the headmistress is marginalized out of the frame..

While Mädchen in Uniform may have been one of the first films to portray lesbian intimacy with seriousness and sensitivity, it played to German audiences who would have seen other films with women in androgynous garb, in German Hosenrollen, from Elisabeth Bergner to Marlene Dietrich. Mädchen in Uniform's success in 1931 was due in large part to its celebration by avowed lesbian magazines such as Die Freundin and Der Skorpion and their readers but also to broad support for feminist and independent women in Weimar Germany. The Nazis suppressed these magazines and the clubs and other institutions that supported them but did not, contrary to claims, ban the film after they took over in 1933. Even after the Nazified German Film Chamber, still run by Fröhlich, stripped the film of credits to Jewish contributors, including Sagan and many of the young women playing students, Mädchen in Uniform circulated in Nazi Germany with advertising favoring Wieck, who disavowed any lesbian content and continued to work in Germany, after Sagan, Thiele, and others had to flee the country. Although threatened with censorship in the U.S. and in Britain, the film had enough impact on British audiences to allow Sagan to produce a stage version based on her film plot, first in London and later in South Africa in 1933, in which revival Sagan not only directed but also played the role of Fräulein von Bernberg. In Germany, having been recut by the Nazi Film Chamber to erase any lesbian elements, Sagan's original film was eclipsed after World War II by the sentimental remake Mädchen in Uniform by Géza von Radványi, starring Romy Schneider. Sagan's original was rediscovered and shown at women's film festivals only from the 1970s but its rediscovery sparked renewed interest in Sagan and her contribution to German and world cinema. The restored version with full credits and English subtitles was released in videotape and later DVD format in the US in 1994 and in the UK in 2000.

Men of Tomorrow (1934), which Sagan directed for London Film Productions and British-Hungarian producer Alexander Korda, was inspired by her observation of student rivalries between athletes and aesthetes among Oxford University men; as the title suggests, Sagan hoped to shift the emphasis from the earlier drama between women of Yesterday and Today to young men in Men of Tomorrow. Made under more prudish British conditions than Weimar Germany, the treatment of same-sex attachments among Oxford "aesthetes" was more subdued and, according to Sagan's account of the plot, the central leader of the aesthetes, ends up marrying a young woman from one of the few women's colleges at the university. Korda likely had some influence on this conventional heterosexual ending, and his distributors treated the film as a "quota quickie". Quota quickies were a low-budget films made in Britain with British cast and crew to enable international producers and distributors such as Korda to fulfill a quota of local films so as to reap far greater profits from British releases of U.S. films. Although Sagan's may be confused with a later film called Men of Tomorrow (1945), a quite different story about the Boy Scouts, Sagan's film, like many quota quickies, has since vanished, as noted in the List of lost films. The Library of Congress once included a flyer from The Film Daily advertising the film in 1934 but that too has disappeared.

== Autobiographies ==
Sagan kept notes on her aspirations and career from her adolescence in Johannesburg through her theatrical training in Vienna, and her theatre and film direction in Germany, Britain, South Africa, and Australia. After her death, her niece Helga Kaye gave the manuscripts, newspaper clippings, and photographs to the Historical Papers archive at the University of the Witwatersrand (Wits) in Johannesburg. Sagan wrote two versions of her autobiography: the German-language manuscript appears to have been written earlier, and covers her work in Austria and Germany in greater detail, while the English-language one is much longer and includes Sagan's "joyride" to Hollywood and her post-war work in Britain and across the British Commonwealth as well as in South Africa.

Both published versions of this autobiographical material blend the English and the German texts to cover Sagan's life and work across four continents over more than six decades:

- Loren Kruger (ed.). Lights and Shadows: The Autobiography of Leontine Sagan, Wits University Press, Johannesburg 1996; ISBN 978-1868-142880
- Michael Eckardt (ed.). Leontine Sagan. Licht und Schatten. Schauspielerin und Regisseurin auf vier Kontinenten. Hentrich & Hentrich, Berlin 2010, ISBN 978-3-941450-12-7.

== See also ==
- List of female film and television directors
- List of LGBT-related films directed by women
