= Crest of the Wave (musical) =

Sheet music cover

Crest of the Wave is a musical with book and music by Ivor Novello and lyrics by Christopher Hassall.

It premiered at the Theatre Royal, Drury Lane in London, on 1 September 1937, starring Novello as both hero and villain, Dorothy Dickson, Olive Gilbert, Walter Crisham and Edgar Elmes. Directed by Novello's frequent collaborator Leontine Sagan, it ran for 203 performances.

The best-known songs from the musical are "Rose of England", "Why isn't it you?", "Haven of your heart" and "If you only knew". The story concerns an impoverished nobleman, The Duke of Cheviot, who is shot by a lover and pursued by the villainous Otto Fresch. The staging featured a spectacular train crash, one of several Novello musicals featuring a spectacular disaster: Glamorous Night has a shipwreck and Careless Rapture depicts an earthquake.

== Original cast ==
- The Duke of Cheviot ("Don") / Otto French (a Film Star) - Ivor Novello
- The Knight of Gantry - Edgar Elmes
- Stone - Kenneth Howell
- Lord William Gantry - Peter Graves
- Virginia, Duchess of Cheviot - Marie Lohr
- 1st Woman - Judith Wren
- 2nd Woman - Dorothy Batley
- Leonora Hayden - Ena Burrill
- Josef von Palasti - Oscar Alexander
- Assistant / 3rd English Type - John Palmer
- Honey Wortle - Dorothy Dickson
- Mrs. Wortle - Minnie Rayner
- The Queen (in Fair Maid of France) / Manuelita - Olive Gilbert
- Freddie Layton - Walter Crisham
- Frampton / 1st English Type - Reginald Smith
- A Steward / Nightclub Manager/ a Porter - Fred Hearne
- Passport Official - Jack Glyn
- Telegraph Boy - Sandy Williamson
- Chair Steward - Aubrey Rouse
- Entertainments Organiser - Harry Fergusson
- Filomena/Phyllis - Renee Stocker
- Glutz - Finlay Currie
- 2nd English Type - Basil Neale
- Footman - Eric Davy
- A Stranger - Charles Tully
- The Vicar - Selwyn Morgan

The production was designed by Alick Johnstone.

== Critical reception ==
Alan Bott wrote in the Tatler of the production and of Novello: "Once a year he delivers the formula, the story, the tunes, the ideas for spectacle, the personality, the profile, the archness, the attitudes, and the variegated goods; and that once a year is enough to fill London's Largest Theatre until half-way through the next year. He draws to the Lane thousands who enter a theatre hardly ever. As to his formula, it has given pleasure to a million or two."
