= Denis Martin =

Northern Irish singer, actor, producer (1920–1988)

- Also known as: Denis Martin
- Born: Lorenzo Denis Martin; 1920; Belfast, Northern Ireland
- Died: October 1988 (aged 67–68) London, England
- Genres: Musical theatre; Light opera
- Occupations: Singer; musical arranger; director; producer
- Years active: 1940s–1980s
- Label: Parlophone

Denis Martin (1920 – October 1988) was a Northern Irish singer, actor and theatre producer active in the 1940s to 1980s.

Martin won the All-Ireland tenor competition at Feis Ceoil in 1944, He then moved to England where he performed as a singer in musical shows and in radio and TV broadcasts. Soon after arriving in England Denis joined the Players' Theatre, a permanent music-hall company in London. In 1949 he played the juvenile lead in King's Rhapsody with Ivor Novello. He went on to become the Director of Production at the Players' Theatre, developing and adapting plays for musical theatre.

Denis's brother Brendan joined him in London as a professional singer at the Windmill Theatre.

== Discography ==
=== Albums ===
- Songs of the Emerald Isle (1969)

=== Singles ===
- Galway Bay / Terence's Farewell (1948)
- Eileen Oge / Sing Sweet Nightingale (1948)
- Come Back Paddy Reilly / The Last Mile Home (1949)

== Stage and screen ==
=== Film and television roles ===
- These Wonderful Shows
- Music for You
- Tonight's the Night (1954)
- Here and Now (TV) (1955)
- The Bamboo Prison (film) (1954)
- Happy Ever After (1954)
- The Good Old Days (TV) (1969–1971)

=== Radio ===
- Yuletide in the Music-Hall A Christmas Box at the Players' Theatre; BBC Radio 4, 25 December 1969

=== Theatre roles ===
- The Duenna
- Pacific 1860 (1946)
- Tuppence Coloured (1947)
- Oranges and Lemons (1947)
- King's Rhapsody (1949)
- The Punch Revue (1955)

=== As producer ===
- A Little of What you Fancy (1968)
