= Crest of the Wave =

Crest of the Wave may refer to:

- Crest of the Wave (musical), a 1937 musical.
- Crest of the Wave (film), the American title of the 1954 British film Seagulls Over Sorrento.
- "Crest of the Wave", song recorded by Foals in the album Life Is Yours
