= The Dancing Years (film) =

- Argentine poster
- Directed by: Harold French
- Written by: Warwick Ward; Jack Whittingham
- Based on: the play by Ivor Novello
- Produced by: Warwick Ward
- Starring: Dennis Price; Gisèle Préville; Patricia Dainton
- Cinematography: Stephen Dade
- Edited by: Richard Best
- Music by: Ivor Novello; Robert Farnon (orch); Louis Levy (MD)
- Production company: ABPC
- Distributed by: Associated British-Pathé
- Release date: 1950
- Running time: 98 minutes
- Country: United Kingdom
- Language: English
- Box office: £205,868 (UK)

The Dancing Years is a 1950 British musical film directed by Harold French and starring Dennis Price, Gisèle Préville and Patricia Dainton. It was written by Warwick Ward and Jack Whittingham based on the musical by Ivor Novello.

== Plot ==
A pre-First World War love affair between a young composer and a star of the musical stage falters through a misunderstanding which causes her to leave him and marry a prince.

== Cast ==
- Dennis Price as Rudi Kleber
- Gisèle Préville as Maria Zeitler
- Patricia Dainton as Grete
- Anthony Nicholls as Prince Reinaldt
- Grey Blake as Franzel
- Muriel George as Hatti
- Olive Gilbert as Frau Kurt
- Martin Ross as tenor
- Gerald Case as Rudi's secretary
- Carl Jaffe as head waiter
- Jeremy Spenser as Maria's son

== Production ==
Dennis Price was loaned by the Rank Organisation to ABPC to play the lead role.

== Reception ==
=== Critical ===
The Monthly Film Bulletin wrote: "All the familiar sage ingredients literally transferred to the screen, plus highly coloured location backgrounds (The White Horse Inn, St. Wolfgang), with heavy sentiment as the keynote."

Kine Weekly wrote: "The picture is not strong in humour, but its pulse is steady and the carefully cultivated heart interest, underlined by lilting songs and colourful dance routines, presented against a wide variety of superb Austrian exteriors and tasteful interiors, admirably fits its mood and period. Tuneful music, gay and stately ensembles and rich settings, plus a great title, put it right in the big money. Unadulterated Ivor Novello, it's definitely a proposition no alert showman can afford to miss."

In The New York Times, Bosley Crowther wrote, "the British obviously spared no expense in bringing Ivor Novello's The Dancing Years to the screen. For, in the operetta, which came to the Little Carnegie on Saturday, Vienna, before and after the first World War, was never lovelier than it is in the panchromatic shades of Technicolor; the singers, ballet corps, sets and staging are as handsome as any conjured up in a fairy tale; and the scenarists have not missed a cliché in recounting the bittersweet saga of lovelorn artists' lives ... Mr. Novello's music is pleasing but his plot is painfully transparent ... Dennis Price, as the minor-league Johann Strauss of the piece, ages gracefully and is appropriately glum throughout the proceedings. As the operetta star and his opposite number, Giselle Preville is attractive, wears the clothes of the period (1910–1926) with distinction and does well vocally by a lilting number titled, "Waltz of My Heart." One of Miss Preville's lines, however, is not quite pointed. "Vienna", she says at the beginning of this yarn, "needs a new composer." Judging by The Dancing Years, Vienna could use a new story."

In The Radio Times Guide to Films Robyn Karney gave the film 2/5 stars, writing: "Directed by Harold French, this screen transfer of a musical by Ivor Novello is outmoded, sickly sweet and devoid of what charm the original stage show offered. The debonair Price is hardly a natural for the genre, but the film does offer Novello's melodies."

=== Box office ===
Trade papers called the film a "notable box office attraction" in British cinemas in 1950. According to Kinematograph Weekly The Dancing Years was a runner-up in the "biggest winners" at the box office in 1950 Britain.
