= Fresh Fields (play) =

1933 British play by Ivor Novello

Fresh Fields is a comedy play by the British writer Ivor Novello, first staged in 1933. Its West End run lasted for 465 performances at the Criterion Theatre between 5 January 1933 and 17 February 1934. The original cast included Robert Andrews, Fred Groves, Lilian Braithwaite, Minnie Rayner and Martita Hunt.

== Bibliography ==
- Wearing, J.P. The London Stage 1930-1939: A Calendar of Productions, Performers, and Personnel. Rowman & Littlefield, 2014.
