= Careless Rapture =

1936 musical play by Ivor Novello

Theatre Royal flyer

Careless Rapture is a 'musical play' by the Welsh composer Ivor Novello and lyrics by Christopher Hassall. It premiered on 11 September 1936 at the Theatre Royal, Drury Lane. It ran for 295 performances, a relatively modest success given Novello's other major successes.

Written as another large-scale extravaganza (including a fair on Hampstead Heath and an on-stage earthquake), it followed Novello's hugely successful Glamorous Night of 1935. Careless Rapture is the tale of an actress, Penelope Lee, engaged to the wealthy Sir Robert Alderney, but who is the object of Rodney's half-brother Michael's affections. Set in London, and ending up in China, Michael finally wins Penelope's affections by rescuing her from an earthquake.

Novello himself took the speaking part of Michael in the original production, which also starred Dorothy Dickson as Penelope Lee, Zena Dare as Phyllida Frame and Olive Gilbert as Mme Simonetti. Ivy Tresmand later took over the part of Penelope Lee. The production was directed by Leontine Sagan.

== Principal songs ==
- "Music in May"
- "Why is there ever goodbye?"
- "The Manchuko"
- "Love made the song"
- "The Bridge of Lovers"
