= Chance Acquaintance =

1927 play by John Van Druten

- Written by: John Van Druten
- Original language: English
- Genre: Comedy

Premiere
- Date premiered: 2 November 1927
- Place premiered: Criterion Theatre, London

Chance Acquaintance is a 1927 play by the British writer John Van Druten, one of his earliest.

It was staged at the Criterion Theatre in the West End for a run of 19 performances between 2 and 19 November 1927. The cast included Helen Haye, Robert Andrews, Benita Hume, Una O'Connor and Reginald Gardiner.

== Bibliography ==
- Wearing, J. P. The London Stage 1920-1929: A Calendar of Productions, Performers, and Personnel. Rowman & Littlefield, 2014.
