= Zena Dare =

English actress and singer (1887–1975)

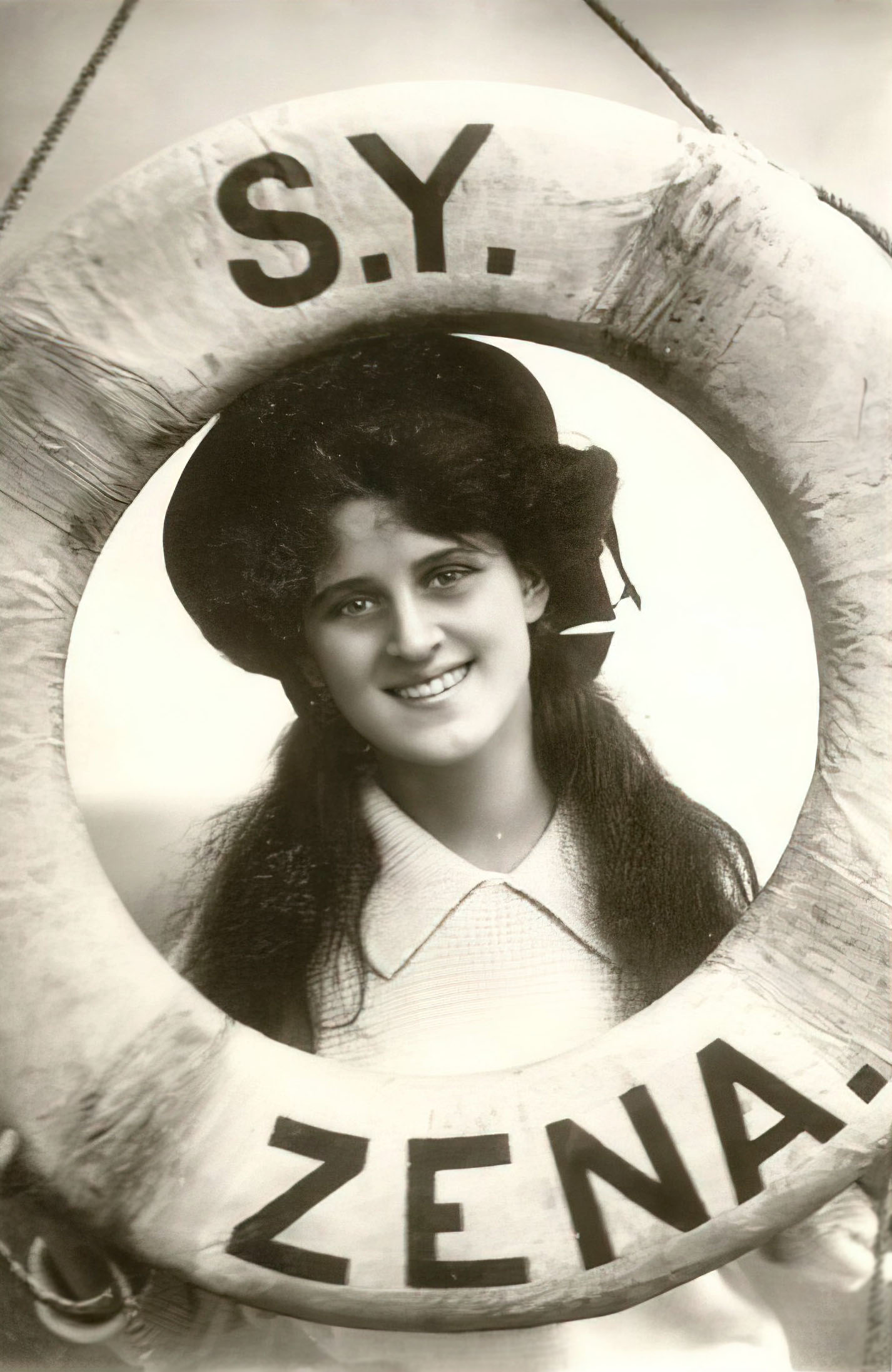
- Dare c. 1905
- Born: Florence Hariette Zena Dones; February 4, 1887; Chelsea, London, U.K.
- Died: March 11, 1975 (aged 88); London, U.K.
- Occupation: Actress
- Years active: 1899–1969
- Spouse: Maurice Vyner Baliol Brett (m. 1911; died 1934)
- Relatives: Phyllis Dare (sister)

Zena Dare (born Florence Hariette Zena Dones; 4 February 1887 – 11 March 1975) was an English actress and singer, who was famous for her performances in Edwardian musical comedy and other musical theatre and comedic plays in the first half of the 20th century.

In a career spanning more than six decades, Dare made her first appearance on stage in 1899, in the Christmas pantomime Babes in the Wood in London, where she performed under her real name Florence Dones. She starred alongside her sister Phyllis in the production, and they both adopted the stage name of Dare soon afterwards. In the first decade of the 1900s, she starred in pantomimes and various Edwardian musical comedy productions including An English Daisy, Sergeant Brue and The Catch of the Season, as well as the title roles in Lady Madcap and The Girl on Stage. She retired in 1911 and nursed soldiers in France during World War I.

Dare returned to the stage in 1926 where she played the title role in The Last of Mrs. Cheyney. This was followed with a role in The Second Man alongside Noël Coward. In 1928, she formed her own production company and, a year later, took over the management of the Haymarket Theatre. On stage, she starred in The First Mrs. Fraser, Other Men's Wives and Cynara, and she appeared in pantomime at the London Palladium. Late in her career, she had a big success as Mrs. Higgins in the long-running original London production of My Fair Lady.

In addition to her stage roles, Dare occasionally appeared in film and made her debut in the silent film No. 5 John Street in 1921. She made a successful transition to "talkies" appearing in The Return of Carol Deane in 1938 and Over the Moon a year later. She died in London in 1975 at the age of 88.

== Life and career ==
Dare was born in Chelsea, London, the oldest of three children of Arthur Albert Dones, a divorce clerk, and his wife Harriette Amelia (née Wheeler). Her sister, Phyllis, three and a half years her junior, also became a well-known musical comedy actress. They had a brother named Jack. Dare was educated at Maida Vale High School.

=== Early career ===
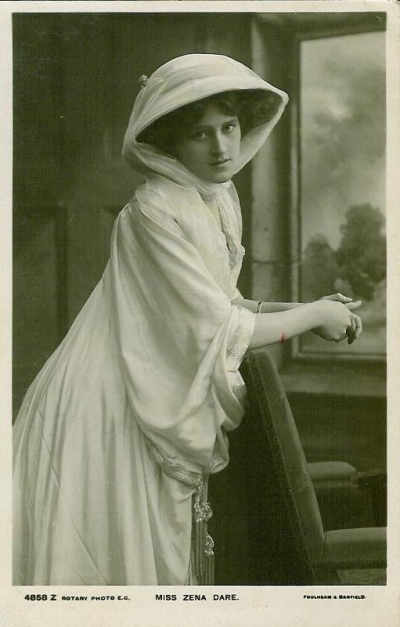
Dare, c. 1908

Dare had her first performance on stage in 1899, at the age of 12, in the Christmas pantomime Babes in the Wood at the Coronet Theatre in London. Her sister Phyllis was also cast in this production, and they both adopted the stage name Dare. From 1900, she played in various pantomimes produced by F. Wyndham in Edinburgh and Glasgow.

In 1902, at the age of 15, Dare was hired by Seymour Hicks to tour as Daisy Maitland in An English Daisy, and to play the title role in Cinderella in 1903–04 at the Shakespeare Theatre in Liverpool. She spent much of 1904 touring but returned to London to play Aurora Brue in Sergeant Brue for Frank Curzon's theatre company. She left the company to create the role of Angela on in September 1904 in The Catch of the Season at the Vaudeville Theatre opposite Hicks. The role would have gone to Ellaline Terriss, Hicks' wife, but she was pregnant. Dare left Catch of the Season in 1905 to play Beauty in Sleeping Beauty in Bristol. Terriss later assumed the role of Angela, and Dare's sister Phyllis took over the role from Terriss.

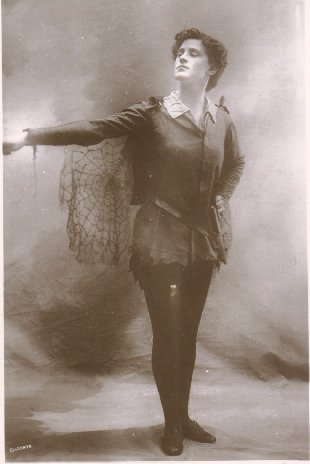
in Peter Pan

In 1905 to 1906, Dare was hired by producer George Edwardes to play three roles at The Prince of Wales Theatre in London: the title role in Lady Madcap, Lady Elizabeth Congress in The Little Cherub and the title role in The Girl on Stage. Dare left Edwardes' company in 1906 to play Betty Silverthorne in Hicks' The Beauty of Bath at the Aldwych Theatre. Later that year, she reprised her role in the touring production of The Catch of the Season and ended the year starring as Peter Pan, in J. M. Barrie's play, in Manchester.

In 1907, she returned to the Aldwych as Victoria Siddons in The Gay Gordons and spent the rest of the year in a tour of one act plays with Hicks' company. She spent 1908 and the beginning of 1909 touring both in The Gay Gordons, this time in the lead role of Peggy Quainton, and in Sweet and Twenty, among other pieces. In March 1909, she starred in Papa's Wife at the London Coliseum and then played Princess Amaranth in Mitislaw or The Love Match at the Hippodrome. She spent the better part of 1910 touring as Duc de Richelieu in The Dashing Little Duke, before returning to the Hippodrome to perform in The Model and the Man.

=== Later years ===
While appearing in The Catch of the Season, she met and subsequently became engaged to Maurice Vyner Baliol Brett (1882–1934), the second son of the 2nd Viscount Esher. They married in January 1911, and, at age 23, at the height of her career, Dare retired from the theatre. The couple moved to rural Chilston, near Ascot, Berkshire, and raised a son and two daughters. Eager to help the war effort during World War I, Dare nursed injured soldiers for three years at Mrs. Vanderbilt's American Hospital in France.

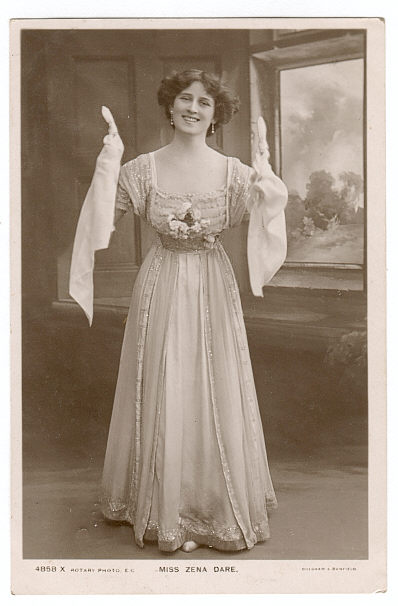

In 1926, after fifteen years away from the stage, Dare played the title role of Mrs. Cheyney in The Last of Mrs. Cheyney at Golders Green, London and then on tour. In 1928, she played Kendall Frayne in The Second Man with Noël Coward at the Playhouse. Dare began her own theatre company in 1928 and toured South Africa in The High Road, The Trial of Mary Dugan, The Squeaker and Other Men's Wives. She returned from her tour at the end of 1929 and took over the management of the Haymarket Theatre, where she played Mrs. Fraser in The First Mrs. Fraser. The next year, she toured in The First Mrs. Fraser, and as Femme de Chambre in Other Men's Wives and Clemency Warlock in Cynara. During the Christmas seasons of 1931 and 1932, she played Mrs. Darling in Peter Pan at the London Palladium. During 1932, she toured as Leslie in Counsel's Opinion.

In 1933, Dare began her long association with Ivor Novello, playing his mother in Proscenium at the Globe Theatre. In 1934, she played Mrs. Sherry in Novello's Murder in Mayfair at the Theatre Royal, Drury Lane. Her husband died that year. In 1936, she played Phyllida Frame in Novello's long-running musical Careless Rapture. In 1938, she went on to play Tiny Fox-Coller in Farrell and Perry's Irish comedy, Spring Meeting, at the Ambassadors Theatre, which was directed by John Gielgud. She then toured in this role in 1939.

In 1940, for the first time in over four decades, Zena and Phyllis Dare shared the stage in a tour of Full House, in which Dare played Frynne Rodney. In 1941 at the Globe Theatre, Dare played Lady Caroline in a revival of Dear Brutus. At Christmas of the same year, she again played the part of Mrs. Darling in Peter Pan. In 1943 she played Fanny Farrelly in a tour of The Watch on the Rhine, followed by the Red Queen in Gielgud's revival of Alice Through the Looking Glass at the Scala Theatre in London. In 1944, she played Elsie in Another Love Story at the Phoenix Theatre. She rejoined Novello at the Hippodrome in 1945, taking over the part of Charlotte Fayre in Perchance to Dream. In 1949, she appeared as the royal mother in Novello's musical King's Rhapsody at the Palace Theatre, again with her sister Phyllis. The show ran for two years, surviving Novello's death.

In My Fair Lady (centre) with Julie Andrews and Alec Clunes

In 1954, again at the Palace, Dare played Julia Ward Mckinlock in Sabrina Fair. At the Savoy Theatre she played Edith Billingsley in Double Image, and later that year at the Globe Theatre, she took over the part of the bogus painter's widow, Isobel Sorodin, in Nude with Violin by Noël Coward. Dare's last theatrical role was as Mrs. Higgins, Henry Higgins' mother, in the original London production of My Fair Lady beginning in 1958 and running for five and a half years. Dare was the only one of the principal performers to stay for the complete run, followed by a season on tour. At its conclusion, she retired from the stage.

In addition to her stage career, Dare made several appearances on television and in films. Her films included the silent films No. 5 John Street(1921) and A Knight in London (1929) Her "talkies" included The Return of Carol Deane (1938) and Over the Moon (1939). She also appeared in several television movies in England including: Spring Meeting (1938), Barbie (1955), The Burning Glass (1956) and An Ideal Husband (1969). In 1963, she was the subject of an episode of This Is Your Life on the BBC.

She died in London in 1975 at the age of 88. Her sister Phyllis died six weeks later.
