= Rose of England =

1937 song

"Rose of England" is a patriotic song with music by Welsh composer Ivor Novello and lyrics by Englishman Christopher Hassall, written in 1937 for their musical Crest of the Wave.

The flower to which the song's lyrics refer is one of England's national emblems, the Tudor Rose. The popularity of "Rose of England" resulted in suggestions that it should replace "God Save the Queen" as the English sporting anthem.

John Cleese used the music for his comic song "I've got a ferret sticking up my nose" on I'm Sorry, I'll Read That Again.

The song was performed on the piano by Maggie Smith in the film A Private Function and sung by Patricia Routledge in an episode of Keeping Up Appearances.
