= Dorothy Dickson =

American actress (1893–1995)

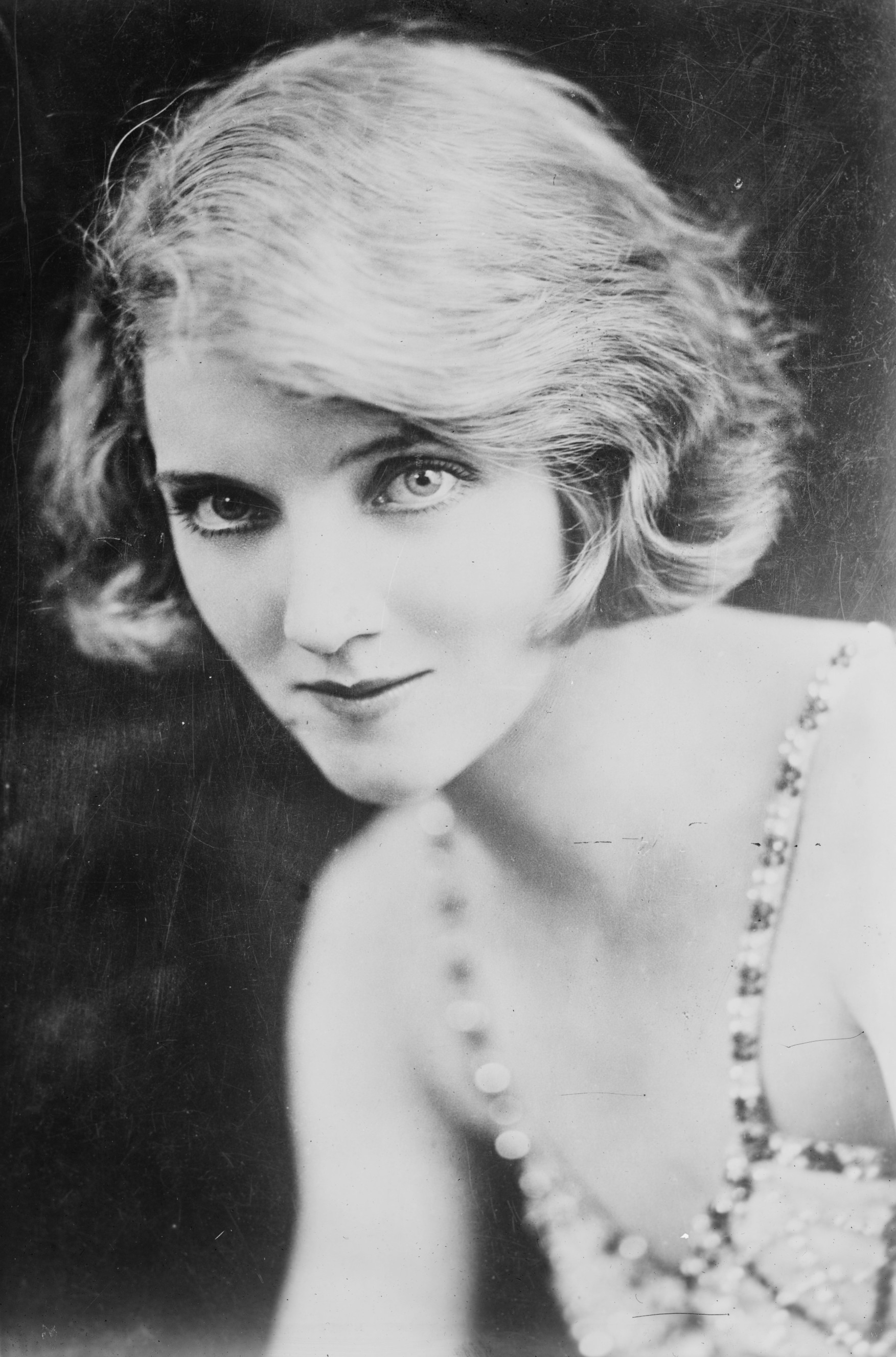
- Dorothy Dickson, 1927
- Born: July 25, 1893; Kansas City, Missouri
- Died: September 25, 1995 (aged 102); London, England, UK
- Occupations: Actress & singer
- Spouse: Carl Hyson
- Children: 1 (Dorothy, Lady Quayle)

Dorothy Schofield Dickson (July 25, 1893 – September 25, 1995) was an American-born, London-based theater actress and singer.

== Biography and career ==
Dickson is known mostly for her rendition of the Jerome Kern song "Look for the Silver Lining". She was also a member of the Ziegfeld Follies and made many appearances in New York and abroad. In 1922, she starred in The Cabaret Girl. In 1936, she co-starred with Ivor Novello in his Careless Rapture and, in 1937, in his Crest of the Wave. She starred in a few silent films, including Eastward Ho! (1919) and Paying the Piper (1921).

During her early days on the London stage, Dickson was introduced to (as well as centenarian) Lady Elizabeth Bowes-Lyon, later the Queen Mother. The two became close friends and their friendship lasted until Dickson's death at age 102. Her daughter was the actress Dorothy Hyson, who was married to Sir Anthony Quayle.

During the Second World War she was involved in organising the London version of Stage Door Canteen.

== Stage ==
- The Private Road by John Carlton (1934), Comedy Theatre
- Stop Press (1935), Adelphi Theatre
- Careless Rapture by Ivor Novello (1938), Theatre Royal Dury Lane
- Crest of the Wave by Ivor Novello (1937), Theatre Royal Dury Lane
- Fine and Dandy (1942), Saville Theatre
- Our Betters by William Somereset Maugham, (1946)
- As Long As They’re Happy with Jack Buchanan (1953), Garrick Theatre

== Filmography ==
- Eastward Ho! (1919)
- The Silver Lining (1921)
- Paying the Piper (1921)
- Headin' North (1921)
- The Road Is Fine (1930)
- Channel Crossing (1933)
- Danny Boy (1934)
- Sword of Honour (1939)
