= We'll Gather Lilacs =

1945 show tune by Ivor Novello

- by Ivor Novello
- Original sheet music cover, Chappell, 1945
- Other name: We'll Gather Lilacs In The Spring
- Key: F Major
- Genre: Show tunes
- Performed: 21 April 1945: Hippodrome Theatre, London, England

We'll Gather Lilacs, also called We'll Gather Lilacs In The Spring, is a song by Welsh composer Ivor Novello which he wrote for the hit musical romance Perchance to Dream. The stage musical opened at the Hippodrome Theatre in London's West End in 1945 and ran until 1948. The song, sung in the show by Olive Gilbert, was the most popular and enduring to emerge from the production.

It was originally recorded by Muriel Barron & Olive Gilbert (1945) and by Geraldo and his Orchestra, who reached the UK charts with it in 1946. A recording by Tommy Dorsey and His Orchestra (vocal by Stuart Foster) was a minor hit in the US in 1946. It has since been performed by many artists, including notably Anne Ziegler and Webster Booth, Richard Tauber, Bing Crosby (recorded December 18, 1945), Frank Sinatra (for his album Sinatra Sings Great Songs from Great Britain (1962)), Marion Grimaldi and Julie Andrews.

Written as World War II drew to its close, the song describes the yearning of parted couples to be reunited. It evokes the joy they would feel when together once again, and the pleasures of the English countryside in spring with its lilac blossom.

The song was performed at Novello's cremation in 1951 by Olive Gilbert. It was also used in the 1954 film Lilacs in the Spring.

== Chorus ==
We'll gather lilacs in the spring again
And walk together down an English lane
Until our hearts have learnt to sing again
When you come home once more.

And in the evening by the firelight's glow
You'll hold me close and never let me go
Your eyes will tell me all I want to know
When you come home once more.
