= Fatal Lady =

1936 film by Edward Ludwig

- Movie poster
- Directed by: Edward Ludwig
- Written by: William R. Lipman; Horace McCoy; Samuel Ornitz; Harry Segall; Tiffany Thayer
- Produced by: Walter Wanger
- Starring: Walter Pidgeon; Mary Ellis; Ruth Donnelly
- Cinematography: Leon Shamroy
- Edited by: Ernest J. Nims
- Music by: Victor Young
- Production company: Walter Wanger Productions
- Distributed by: Paramount Pictures
- Release date: May 15, 1936
- Running time: 73 minutes
- Country: United States
- Language: English
- Budget: $431,862
- Box office: $201,707

Fatal Lady is a 1936 American musical mystery film directed by Edward Ludwig and starring Walter Pidgeon, Mary Ellis and Ruth Donnelly. It recorded a loss of $296,665.

The film's sets were designed by art director Alexander Toluboff.

== Plot ==
When opera singer Marion Stuart (Mary Ellis) is questioned regarding the death of a friend she escapes to Brazil.

== Cast ==
- Mary Ellis as Marion Stuart / Maria Delasano / Malevo
- Walter Pidgeon as David Roberts
- John Halliday as Martan Fontes
- Ruth Donnelly as Melba York
- Alan Mowbray as Uberto Malla
- Guy Bates Post as Feodor Glinka
- Samuel S. Hinds as Guili Ruffano
- Norman Foster as Phillip Roberts
- Edgar Kennedy as Rudolf Hochstetter
- Jean Rouverol as Anita
- Virginia Lee as Brazilian Opera Troupe
