= The Dancing Years =

- West End souvenir theatre programme
- Music: Ivor Novello
- Lyrics: Christopher Hassall
- Book: Ivor Novello
- Productions: 1939 West End

The Dancing Years is a musical with book and music by Ivor Novello and lyrics by Christopher Hassall, set in Vienna, from 1911 until 1938. It follows a Jewish composer and his love for two women of different social classes, with an ending set against the background of Nazi persecution.

The piece opened in early 1939 in London's West End, starring Novello in an expensive, spectacular production, with several scene changes and a large cast. When theatres in London closed at the start of the Second World War, the show went on tour in Britain for the next three years. Censorship originally prevented the inclusion of the Nazi element, but by the time The Dancing Years reopened at the Adelphi Theatre in 1942 it had been reinstated.

== Synopsis ==
In 1911, Rudi Kleber, a penniless young Jewish composer, plays the piano at an Austrian country inn, where he has been friends since childhood with the innkeeper's daughter, Grete; they pledge to marry someday. Maria Zeitler, an operetta star, arrives with her older admirer and patron, Prince Charles Metterling. She and Rudi fall in love, and she becomes his mistress; he composes successful operettas for her. Three years later, Grete returns from England. She has become a dancer, and Rudi swiftly includes her in his production. Maria is jealous, fearing Rudi is in love with Grete, even though Grete has a boyfriend, Franzl. Maria overhears Rudi proposing to Grete in jest and does not wait to hear Grete laughingly reject him. Pregnant and believing Rudi will never marry her, Maria returns to Vienna and immediately marries Prince Charles.

Maria's child, Otto, is brought up to believe he is Metterling's son. A dozen years later, Maria introduces Otto to Rudi. Rudi and Maria discover that they are still love with each other, and Maria is unhappy in her marriage, but Rudi realizes he must not break up her marriage for the sake of their son.

Another decade passes. In 1938 Rudi is arrested by the Nazis for helping Jews to escape Austria, but Maria uses her husband's connections to help him. She assures him that their son opposes the Nazis and tells him that he will be remembered for making "the whole world dance".

== Productions ==
The musical was first produced at London's Theatre Royal, Drury Lane on 23 March 1939, directed by Novello's frequent collaborator Leontine Sagan. Novello starred opposite Mary Ellis. It closed at the start of the Second World War in September 1939 after 187 performances. After a three-year provincial tour, the show reopened at the Adelphi Theatre on 14 March 1942, running there until July 1944, for a total of 969 performances. It was the most popular show of the war and earned an estimated £1,000,000. After this, the show toured extensively in Britain and was revived numerous times, including in London, and was adapted for film and television. The 1968 West End revival starred June Bronhill.

The Australian production opened in Melbourne at His Majesty's Theatre in June 1946. The cast included Max Oldaker as Rudi, Elizabeth Gaye as Grete and Viola Wilson as Maria.

== Original and 1942 casts ==
- Rudi Kleber – Ivor Novello (both casts)
- Maria Ziegler – Mary Ellis; Muriel Barron
- Grete Schone – Roma Beaumont (both casts)
- Cacilie Kurt – Olive Gilbert (both casts)
- Franzl – Peter Graves (both casts)
- Prince Charles Metterling – Anthony Nicholls; Victor Bogetti
- Minnie Rayner

== Songs ==
- Waltz of My Heart
- Wings of Sleep
- My Life Belongs to You
- Three Ballet Tunes
- I Can Give You the Starlight
- My Dearest Dear
- Primrose
- Leap Year Waltz
- Lorelei

== Adaptations ==
The musical was turned into a popular film in 1950. The film cuts some songs and all of Act 3. Televised productions were aired by United Kingdom channels BBC in 1959, and ITV in 1979.
