= Glamorous Night (film) =

- Directed by: Brian Desmond Hurst
- Written by: Hugh Brooke; Dudley Leslie; William Freshman; J. Lee Thompson (adaptation)
- Based on: musical play Glamorous Night by Ivor Novello
- Produced by: Walter C. Mycroft
- Starring: Mary Ellis; Otto Kruger; Victor Jory; Barry MacKay
- Cinematography: Fritz Arno Wagner
- Edited by: Flora Newton
- Music by: Ivor Novello (composer: songs and incidental music); Harry Acres (musical director)
- Production company: Associated British Picture Corporation
- Distributed by: Associated British Picture Corporation (UK)
- Release dates: 28 April 1937 (London, UK); 15 December 1937 (US)
- Running time: 81 minutes
- Country: United Kingdom
- Language: English

Glamorous Night is a 1937 British romantic musical directed by Brian Desmond Hurst and starring Mary Ellis, Otto Kruger, Victor Jory and Barry MacKay. It is an adaptation of the musical Glamorous Night by Ivor Novello. In a mythical European kingdom, King Stefan clashes with his prime minister and falls in love with the gypsy Melitza.

== Synopsis ==
King Stefan is constantly in conflict with his prime minister, the black-shirted fascist Lyadeff, who is plotting to exploit the kingdom's supposed oil reserves (which Allan and MacKintosh have yet to locate). Stefan is in love with Melitza, a singer who lives in part of the country populated with gypsies, where she dresses as one of them and joins their outdoor revels. Stefan abdicates when Lyadeff and his supporters threaten the life of Melitza. She boards a liner to go into exile. Against the wishes of Lyadeff, in a radio broadcast Stefan urges his subjects to reject the blackshirts. When Melitza hears of the broadcast, with Anthony's help she secretly returns and leads the gypsies in overthrowing the Lyadeff cabal. The crowds gather outside the palace calling for the king, Stefan has Lyadeff arrested.

According to the opening credits the scenes around the liner were courtesy of Shaw Savill and Albion Co. Ltd and the Blue Star Line.

== Cast ==
- Mary Ellis as Melitza Hjos
- Otto Kruger as King Stefan
- Victor Jory as Baron Lyadeff
- Barry MacKay as Anthony Allan
- Trefor Jones as Loretti
- Maire O'Neill as Phoebe
- Anthony Holles as Maestro
- Charles Carson as Otto
- Felix Aylmer as Diplomat
- Finlay Currie as Angus MacKintosh
- Raymond Lovell as Ship's Officer

== Critical reception ==
Sky Movies wrote, "The story creaks like a dowager's stays in this torrid tale of Ruritanian romance and skulduggery based on Ivor Novello's stage success. There are compensations, however, in the tuneful music and elegant production values, to say nothing of gipsies who appear to be addicted to ballet dancing. Victor Jory plays the villainous prime minister with steely determination and an American accent, Mary Ellis is suitably lively although she is hardly a believable Romany. Barry Mackay stands out as an English oil prospector, the role originally played on stage by Novello." Writing for The Spectator in 1937, Graham Greene gave the film a mixed review, describing it as "about as bogus as a film could be", but praising Novello's efforts to bring the film "up to date", and appreciating the photography, the camerawork, the direction, and Ellis' "daemonic good looks".
