= King's Rhapsody =

Original programme cover, Palace Theatre, 1949

King's Rhapsody is a musical with book and music by Ivor Novello and lyrics by Christopher Hassall.

The musical was first produced at the Palace Theatre, London, on 15 September 1949 and ran for 841 performances, surviving its author, who died in 1951. It starred Novello in the title role of the heir to the throne under pressure from his long-lived mother, Queen Elana, to abdicate in favour of his infant son, with Phyllis Dare as his mistress Marta Karillos, Zena Dare as Queen Elana, Vanessa Lee as Princess Cristiane, Robert Andrews as Vanescu, and Olive Gilbert as Countess Vera.

A 1955 film adaptation was made, starring Errol Flynn.

== Musical numbers ==
- The Dancing Lesson
- Birthday Greetings
- Someday My Heart Will Awake
- National Anthem
- Fly Home, Little Heart
- Mountain Dove
- If This Were Love
- The Mayor of Perpignan
- The Gates of Paradise
- Take Your Girl
- The Violin Began to Play
- Muranian Rhapsody (Ballet)
- Coronation Hymn
- The Years Together, theme from the score, used as a number in the film version.

== Original Production ==
The production opened at the Palace Theatre, London, on 15 September 1949 and ran for 841 performances. It was directed by Murray MacDonald, with the following cast:

- Princess Cristiane – Vanessa Lee
- Countess Vera Lemainken, her companion – Olive Gilbert
- King Peter of Norseland, Cristiane's father – Victor Bogetti
- Princesses Kirsten and Hulda, Cristiane's little cousins – Pamela Harrington and Wendy Warren
- Marta Karillos – Phyllis Dare
- Queen Elana of Murania – Zena Dare
- Prime Minister Vanescu – Robert Andrews
- Nikki – Ivor Novello
- Jules, Nikki's valet – Michael Anthony
- Count Egon Stanieff, of the Royal Guard – Denis Martin
- Countess Olga Varsov, a lady in waiting – Anne Pinder
- Madame Koska, a modest – Jaqueline Le Geyt
- Mr. Trontzen, a dance master – John Palmer
- Major Domo – Eric Sutherland
- Manservant – Harry Fergusson
- Tormas – Gordon Duttson
- Boy King – John Young
- Chorus of Norseland village peasants, mannequins, serenaders, palace guards and servants, courtiers, members of the Muranian Royal Ballet Company, and people of Murania.

The dancers were played by the Pauline Grant Ballet.

== Critical reception ==
In The Observer, Ivor Brown was of the opinion that Novello, "can with his tranquility stand up to all the bounding Oklahomans and Brigadooners in the world"; and in The Sunday Times, Harold Hobson considered it "a better musical than South Pacific."

== Adaptations ==
The musical was novelised in 1950 by Hester W. Chapman. The 1955 British film version was directed by Herbert Wilcox, and starred Errol Flynn as Nikki and Anna Neagle as his mistress. A condensed 45-minute version, taken from the film's soundtrack, was broadcast as a BBC Radio play in September 1955.

The piece was produced for BBC Radio in 1950, 1951, 1968 and 1993 to celebrate the 100th anniversary of Novello's birth.

A television version was broadcast in 1957 by the BBC, who (according to the Radio Times) "ingeniously cut the three and a quarter hours of the original action to an hour and a half." Vanessa Lee reprised her role of Princess Cristiane from the original stage production, and Griffith Jones played Nikki, with Margot Grahame as his mistress.
