= Mary Ellis =

American actress and singer (1897–2003)

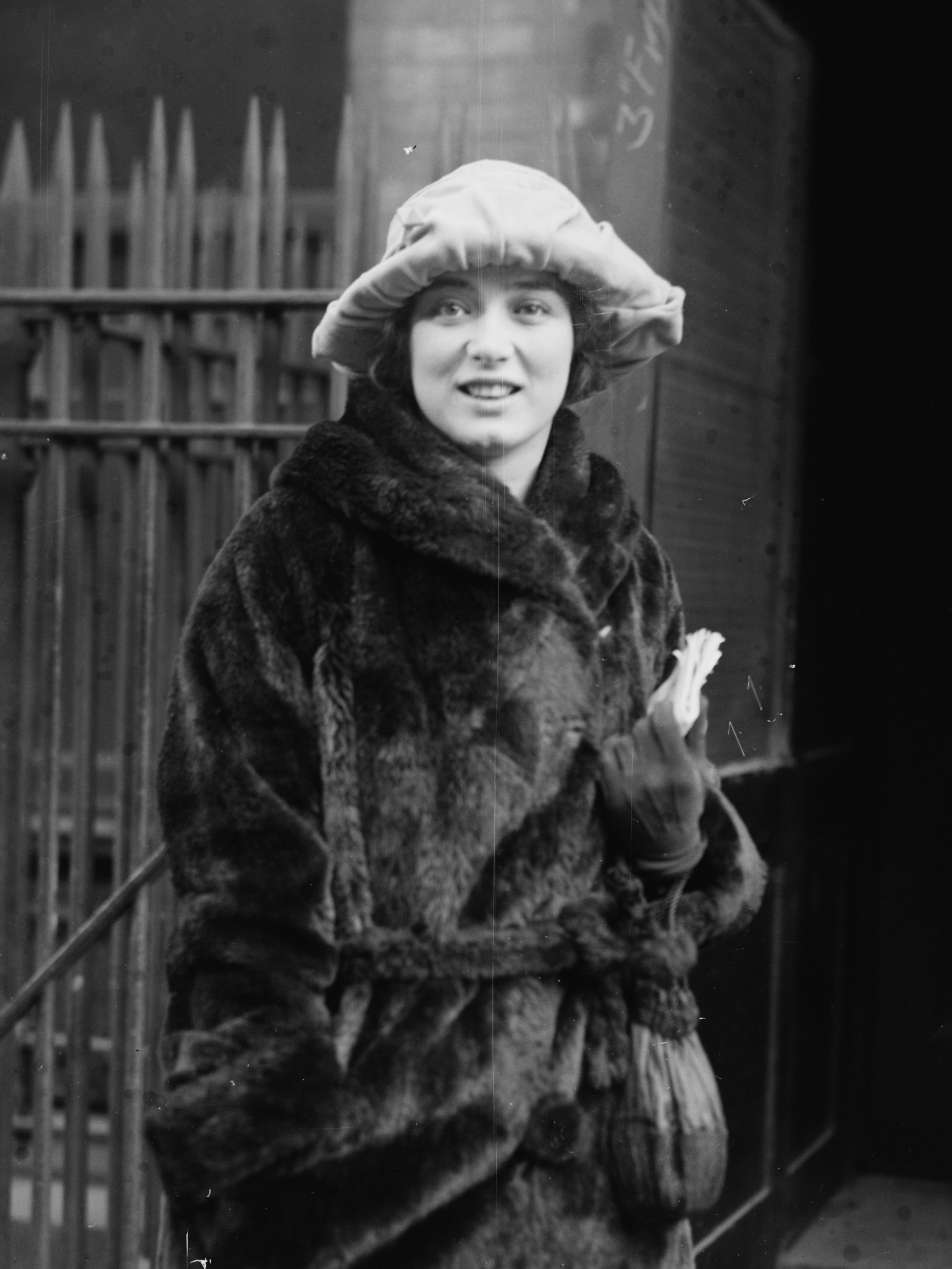
- Ellis in 1920
- Born: May Belle Elsas; June 15, 1897; Manhattan, New York City, U.S.
- Died: January 30, 2003 (aged 105); London, England
- Occupations: Actress and singer
- Years active: 1918–1994

Mary Ellis (born May Belle Elsas; June 15, 1897 – January 30, 2003) was an American actress and singer who spent most of her career in Britain. Trained as a lyric soprano, she began performing at the Metropolitan Opera where she created the role of Genovieffa in the world premiere of Giacomo Puccini's Suor Angelica in 1918. In 1924, she originated the title role in Rudolf Friml's operetta Rose-Marie at Broadway's Imperial Theatre. Other Broadway parts included Shakespeare roles such as Kate in The Taming of the Shrew.

After immigrating to England in 1930, Ellis performed in musicals in London's West End. She achieved enduring fame in the leading roles of the original productions of two Ivor Novello pieces: Glamorous Night (1935) and The Dancing Years (1938). After performing welfare work in hospitals during World War II, she returned to acting in London in plays by Noël Coward, Terence Rattigan and Shakespeare. She also worked in radio, television and film; including in The 3 Worlds of Gulliver in 1960. Her career spanned more than half a century of her 105-year-long life.

== Biography ==
Ellis was born in Manhattan in New York City, to German parents, Herman Elsas and Caroline Elsas (née Reinhardt), who was a pianist. She first became interested in performing around 1910, and in a vocational course began to train her lyric soprano voice under the tutelage of Belgian contralto Freida de Goebele and Italian operatic coach Fernando Tanara.

She made her debut with the Metropolitan Opera on December 14, 1918, in the world premiere of Puccini's Il trittico, creating the role of Genovieffa in Suor Angelica, the second of the evening's three one-act operas. Later in the run, she also played Lauretta in the third opera of the triptych, Gianni Schicchi. She also appeared in the premiere of L'oiseau bleu by Albert Wolff, singing Mytyl, in 1919. While in the Metropolitan company she sang Giannetta in L'elisir d'amore to Enrico Caruso's Nemorino and Fyodor in Boris Godunov to Feodor Chaliapin's Boris.

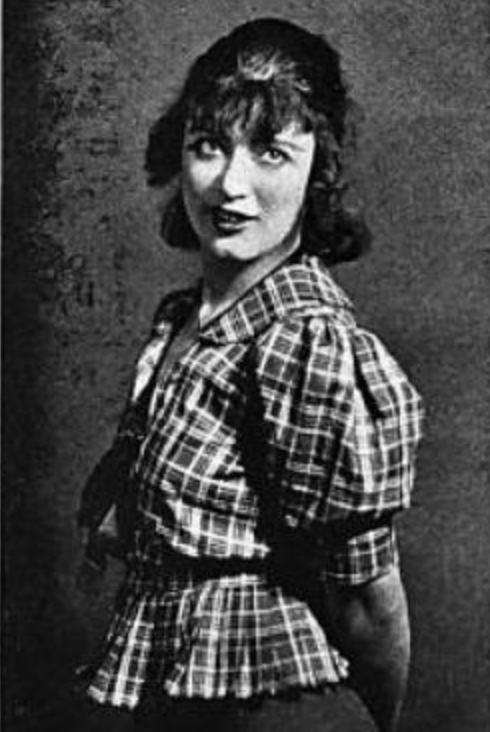
Mary Ellis, from a 1929 publication

On Broadway, Ellis played the roles of street urchin and errand girl in Louis in 1921, Nerissa in the 1922 production of Merchant of Venice and The Dancer from Milan in Casanova (1923). She gained wider notice by creating the title role in Rudolf Friml's long-running operetta Rose-Marie in 1924. Experiencing vocal strain after Rose Marie, she turned to drama, playing playing Leah in The Neighborhood Playhouse's 1925 adaptation of The Dybbuk. Her later Broadway roles included Anna in The Crown Prince (1927), Kate in a long-running revival of The Taming of the Shrew (1927–1928), The Baroness of Spangenburg 12,000 (1928) and Jennifer in Meet the Prince. In 1929 she acted the title role in Becky Sharp in the Players' Club adaptation of Vanity Fair, and played Laetitia in 1930 in Children of Darkness.

In 1920, she married Louis Bernheimer; they subsequently divorced, and in 1923, she married Edwin H. Knopf, whom she divorced in 1925. In 1930, Ellis emigrated to England with Basil Sydney, her third husband, whom she had married in 1929. In London's West End, she starred in Jerome Kern's Music in the Air (1933) and went on to her best remembered roles as the heroines of three Ivor Novello operettas: Glamorous Night (1935), The Dancing Years (1939) and Arc de Triomphe (1943). She also starred in several films in the 1930s, including a film version of Glamorous Night in 1937.

For most of World War II, Ellis was absent from the theatre, performing welfare work in hospitals, and from time to time giving concerts to entertain members of the armed forces. Returning to the stage after the war, Ellis was successful in the 1944 and 1947 British productions of Noël Coward's melodrama Point Valaine, playing a hotel keeper in a sordid, clandestine relationship with her head waiter. In 1948 she gave one of her most praised performances as the embittered Millie Crocker-Harris in Terence Rattigan's The Browning Version. In 1952 she played Volumnia in Coriolanus for the nine-month Stratford season.

In 1954, Ellis was cast as Mrs. Erlynne in Coward's musical After the Ball, but her singing voice had deteriorated drastically, and much of her music had to be cut. Coward blamed her performance for the relative failure of the show. She appeared in the 1960 movie The 3 Worlds of Gulliver and made her last stage appearance in 1970, playing Mrs Warren in Shaw's Mrs Warren's Profession at the Yvonne Arnaud Theatre in Guildford. She appeared in 1993 and 1994 in two episodes of the television series Sherlock Holmes.

She became a centenarian in 1997 and died at her home in Eaton Square in London on January 30, 2003, at the age of 105.

== Memoir and autobiography ==
Ellis published her memoirs in 1982 under the title Those Dancing Years. A further autobiography, Moments of Truth, followed in 1986. She was the last surviving performer to have created a role in a Puccini opera and the last to have sung opposite Caruso.

== Filmography ==
- Bella Donna (1934)
- All the King's Horses (1935)
- Paris in Spring (1935)
- Fatal Lady (1936)
- Glamorous Night (1937)
- The Astonished Heart (1949)
- The Magic Box (1951)
- The 3 Worlds of Gulliver (1960)

== See also ==
- List of centenarians (actors, filmmakers and entertainers)
