= Glamorous Night =

Ivor Novello musical premiered in 1935

- Original Drury Lane programme
- Music: Ivor Novello
- Lyrics: Christopher Hassall
- Book: Ivor Novello
- Premiere: 2 May 1935: Theatre Royal, Drury Lane
- Productions: 1935 West End; 1936 West End; 1975 West End

Glamorous Night is a musical in two acts with a book and music by Ivor Novello and lyrics by Christopher Hassall. Hassall was Novello's collaborator in six of the eight musicals Novello created between 1935 and 1951. Glamorous Night was the first of several hit Novello musicals in the 1930s given expensive, spectacular productions.

The musical was first performed in London in 1935. In 1937 it was adapted as a film of the same name starring Mary Ellis and Otto Kruger.

== Background ==
After beginning the 1930s by writing a series of non-musical plays, Novello returned to musicals in 1935 with Glamorous Night, the first of several very successful large-scale operetta-style pieces that he premiered in spectacular productions. The musical featured extravagant scenery, including a street with a horse-drawn carriage, a ship, an operetta production and a bustling gypsy wedding, and a ballroom; extensive dance numbers; and shipboard skating. The story echoed the political situation in Romania, where King Carol II had renounced his throne to live with, and eventually marry, a Romany actress, Magda Lupescu.

== Productions ==
Glamorous Night was produced by Ivor Novello. The musical opened at the Theatre Royal, Drury Lane in London on 2 May 1935 to robust ticket sales, but it had a limited run due to the pre-booking of a pantomime at the theatre. It then toured in the British provinces before re-opening at the London Coliseum in May 1936 for another short run, for a total of 234 London performances. The role of Anthony Allen was played by Novello, and that of the gypsy (Militza Hajos) was played by Mary Ellis. It was directed by Leontine Sagan, with choreography by Ralph Reader. The plot echoed current events in Rumania, where the king was willing to give up his reign to marry a Romany actress, Mme. Lupesco.

A movie was made of Glamorous Night in 1937, with Barry MacKay taking the role of Anthony Allen, Otto Kruger as King Stephen and Mary Ellis reprising her stage role of Militza.

The show was briefly revived in November 1975 at the New London Theatre, and was part of a UK tour. It was directed by Alexander Bridge and starred John Hanson and Pamela Field.

== Synopsis ==
A young inventor, Anthony Allen, has created a working television but has not had much success in promoting it. The head of a radio broadcasting company fears competition and pays Allen to suppress his invention. Allen takes a luxury cruise to the "Ruritanian" kingdom of Krasnia in Central Europe. There he sees an operetta, Glamorous Nights, starring the gypsy princess Militza Hajos, the prima-donna of the state opera. He meets the star and learns that she is betrothed to the King of Krasnia. Allen saves her from an assassin and, after she flees the country aboard his cruise ship, he rescues her from a shipwreck caused by another assassination plot. They soon fall in love.

Meanwhile, the gypsies side with the King to overcome a revolution and also promote the reunion of Militza and King Stefan. Brokenhearted, Anthony gives her up, for the good of the kingdom. The king finances Anthony's invention. Back in England, Allen watches the king's wedding to Militza on his television.

== Principal characters ==
- Anthony Allen, an inventor – Novello, and later Barry Sinclair
- Militza Hajos, a Gypsy princess – Mary Ellis
- Phoebe, her maid – Minnie Rayner
- Stephen, King of Krasnia – Barry Jones
- Nico, a footman – Peter Graves

Replacements included Robert Andrews, Olive Gilbert, Elisabeth Welch and Muriel Barron.

== Musical numbers ==
- Glamorous Night
- Fold your wings
- Shine through my Dreams
- When a Gypsy Played
- Far Away in Shanty Town
- Why Isn't It You?
- The Girl I Knew

== Film adaptation ==
A 1937 British drama film adaptation of the musical, with the same name, was directed by Brian Desmond Hurst and starred Mary Ellis, Otto Kruger, Victor Jory and Barry MacKay.
