= Christopher Hassall =

British actor and writer (1912–1963)

Christopher Vernon Hassall
- Born: 24 March 1912; Kensington, London, England
- Died: 25 April 1963 (aged 51); Rochester, Kent
- Education: St Michael's College, Tenbury; Wadham College, Oxford
- Occupations: Poet, librettist, biographer

Christopher Vernon Hassall (24 March 1912 – 25 April 1963) was an English actor, dramatist, librettist, lyricist and poet, who found his greatest fame in a memorable musical partnership with the actor and composer Ivor Novello after working together in the same touring company. He was also a noted biographer of Rupert Brooke (1964, Faber and Faber) and Edward Marsh (1958, James Tait Black Memorial Prize 1959).

== Biography ==
Hassall was born in London and educated at St Michael's College, Tenbury, Brighton College and Wadham College, Oxford. He was the son of the illustrator John Hassall and brother of Joan Hassall, who engraved the title page of his book of poetry, Devil's Dyke, published in 1936. Hassall married the actress Eve Lynett, with whom he had a son and a daughter, the actress Imogen Hassall.

Hassall was an experienced actor serving as Ivor Novello's understudy in a minor London drama when Novello invited him to provide the lyrics for a new musical. Their successful collaboration for Glamorous Night (1935) ("Shine Through My Dreams", "Fold Your Wings") began a fifteen-year partnership that included six long-running hits. ('Perchance to Dream' the other hit which Novello wrote during this period, had lyrics by Novello himself). While their musicals delighted West End audiences, they were judged "too British" for America. Jeremy Northam, who played a character based on Ivor Novello in the 2001 Robert Altman movie, Gosford Park, sang "I Can Give You the Starlight" from The Dancing Years, Hassall's and Novello's 1939 musical.

During World War II in 1940, Hassall served in an anti-aircraft gun emplacement with editor John Guest, architect Denys Lasdun, and socialite Angus Menzies. A man of many talents, he recorded a record album entitled Great Voices Read Poetry (1954-1955) along with Richard Burton, Dame Peggy Ashcroft, John Gielgud, Robert Hardy, and Anthony Quayle. Hassall's contributions included: Upon Westminster Bridge, Daffodils, and Ode: Intimations of Immortality by William Wordsworth; and Death Be Not Proud by John Donne.

Hassall lived at Tonford Manor, a house with a mediaeval stone tower situated by the River Stour on the outskirts of Canterbury. He delighted in its fine prospect and had a road named after him in the community. At St Nicholas's Church in nearby Thanington is a small pane of glass engraved in his memory. Shortly before his death in 1963, Hassall spoke about the first Stour Music Festival, saying:

The shared experience … a communion between listener and performer … impossible in a great assembly … (which) means the restoration of a large body of music to the private salon or to the church where it originally belonged. With the appropriate setting and a perceptive audience of proportionate size, the work will not only sound, but feel right.

Hassall died on a train at Rochester, Kent, on 25 April 1963 after suffering a heart attack whilst running for the train to see his daughter Imogen appear in a Royal Ballet School performance at Covent Garden. He was 51.

== Selected works and credits ==
- Rupert Brooke. A Biography (1964)
- Ambrosia and Small Beer: The Record of Correspondence Between Edward Marsh and Christopher Hassall (editor, 1964)
- Bell Harry And Other Poems (1963) poetry.
- Mary of Magdala (1962) libretto - Cantata by Arthur Bliss.
- The Beatitudes (1961) libretto - Cantata by Arthur Bliss.
- Tobias and the Angel (1960) libretto - TV opera by Arthur Bliss.
- Edward Marsh: Patron of the Arts. A Biography (1959)
- Song of Simeon (1959) libretto - Nativity Masque by Sir Malcolm Arnold.
- The Fiery Angel (opera) (c1957) English translation.
- The Prose of Rupert Brooke (editor, 1956)
- The Merry Widow (1955) English translation. (TV) adaptation
- King's Rhapsody (1955) screenplay for the film adaptation
- The Dark Avenger, also known as The Warriors (United States) (1955) — lyricist of "Bella Marie"
- Troilus and Cressida (1954) libretto / Chaucer-adaptation - Opera by Sir William Walton.
- Anna Kraus (1952), librettist for the radio opera by composer Franz Reizenstein
- Dance Hall (1950) ("You're Only Dreaming") lyricist.
- Dear Miss Phoebe (1950) lyricist. (Music by Harry Parr Davies)
- King's Rhapsody (1949) ("Some Day My Heart Will Awake", "Take Your Girl") lyricist. (Music and book by Ivor Novello).
- The Timeless Quest: Stephen Haggard (1948)
- Arc de Triomphe (1943) ("Man of My Heart", "Waking Or Sleeping") lyricist. (Music and book by Ivor Novello).
- The Dancing Years (1939) ("I Can Give You The Starlight", "Primrose", "Waltz of My Heart", "My Dearest Dear", "My Life Belongs To You") lyricist. (Music and book by Ivor Novello).
- Crest of the Wave (1937) lyricist. (Music and book by Ivor Novello).
- The Yellow Iris (1937) lyricist. (Music by Michael Sayer and arranged by Jack Beaver)
- Christ's Comet: The Story of a Thirty Years' Journey that Began and Ended on the Same Day (1937) playwright.
- Devil's Dyke, with Compliment and Satire (1936) poet.
- Poems of Two Years (1935) poet.
- Careless Rapture (1936) lyricist. (Music and book by Ivor Novello).
- Glamorous Night (1935) lyricist (Music and book by Ivor Novello).
