= Robert Andrews (actor) =

English actor (1895–1976)

- Andrews in 1921
- Born: Reginald Frank Andrews; 20 February 1895; Camden Town, England
- Died: 17 January 1976 (aged 80); Kensington, England
- Other name: Robert Tobias Andrews
- Partner: Ivor Novello (1916–51, Novello's death)
- Family: Maidie Andrews (sister)

Robert Tobias Andrews (born Reginald Frank Andrews; 20 February 1895 – 17 January 1976) was a British stage and film actor. He is perhaps best known as the long-term companion of Ivor Novello.

== Early life ==
Robert Andrews was born in Camden Town, the son of Walter Andrews (1861–1935), a horse-drawn omnibus inspector, and his wife Ada Harriet, née Judd (1864–1946). He was the younger brother of actress Maidie Andrews.

== Career ==
Andrews began his stage acting career at age eleven. He made his first stage appearance in the play Shore Acres in 1906. His child actor contemporaries included Noël Coward and Philip Tonge. Coward referred to Andrews as Tonge's "only serious rival" among the "boy actors" of the London theatre.

In 1907, at the age of twelve, Andrews appeared in Horace Annesley's comedy Her Son as "Min, the eight-year-old child of Crystal and Gasgoyne," a role for which he received significant acclaim. Andrews' "finished and sympathetic performance" was described as "the success of [Her Son's] première," "a genuine and surprising triumph" that caused "quite a sensation." In 1911, he briefly worked in Chicago, acting in the play The Backsliders, before returning to London theatre.

His stage career continued into adulthood with performances as Marcel in the 1920 production of The Children's Carnival, Maurice Avery in the 1920 production of Columbine, and Tyltyl in the 1921 production of The Betrothal. In 1921, he appeared as Charles Deburau in the play Deburau; Deburau also featured Andrews's lover Ivor Novello's debut performance. He appeared as Simon in the original production of Noël Coward's Hay Fever at London's Ambassadors Theatre, in 1925. Andrews starred in a number of Novello's theater productions, beginning with the play Fresh Fields in 1932. Amongst his many character parts was the Prime Minister in Ivor Novello's musical play King's Rhapsody at the Theatre Royal, Drury Lane.

While he was primarily a stage actor, Andrews also made several film appearances. In 1923, he acted in the silent film Fires of Innocence as Pen Arkwright. His co-star Joan Morgan later claimed that she did not remember anything about her time working on the film, except for Andrews. She described how, during a "love-scene," Andrews would not look at her because he claimed he did not "feel a bit in the mood to see [her]."

== Personal life ==
Andrews first met Ivor Novello in 1916, while Novello was attending the opera with his friend Edward Marsh. Andrews and Novello eventually became lovers. Andrews was also responsible for introducing Novello to Noël Coward in 1916, at Coward's request. Andrews and Novello both had relations with other men over the course of their long-term relationship, but Andrews remained Novello's primary companion until Novello's death in 1951.

== Death ==
Andrews died in 1976 at his family home, 37 St Mary's Mansions, Paddington.

== Stage credits ==
Year	Production	Role	Theatre	Notes
1906	Shore Acres	Bob	Waldorf Theatre	Debut role
1907	Her Son	Min	Playhouse Theatre	
1908	Ib and Little Christina	Little Ib	Adelphi Theatre	
1908	The Last of the De Mullins	Johnny Seagrave	Theatre Royal Haymarket	
1920	Pygmalion	Freddy Eynsford-Hill	Aldwych Theatre	Reprised his role in the 1920 production at the Duke of York's Theatre
1920	The Children's Carnival	Marcel	Kingsway Theatre	
1920	Columbine	Maurice Avery	Princes Theatre	
1921	The Betrothal	Tyltyl	Gaiety Theatre	
1921	Deburau	Charles Deburau	Ambassadors Theatre	
1922	Secrets	John Carlton	Comedy Theatre	
1924	The Eternal Spring	Pat	Royalty Theatre	
1925	Hay Fever	Simon Bliss	Ambassadors Theatre	Written by Noël Coward
1926	Martinique	Stephane Seguneau	Shaftesbury Theatre	
1927	Chance Acquaintance	Lawrite Bennett	Criterion Theatre	Written by John Van Druten
1932	So Far and No Father	Victor Melbourne	Ambassadors Theatre	
1932	Once a Husband	Bobbie Fanning	Theatre Royal Haymarket	
1933	Fresh Fields	Tim Crabbe	Criterion Theatre	Written by Ivor Novello
1934	Murder in Mayfair	Bill Sherry	Globe	Written by Ivor Novello
1935	Full House	John	Theatre Royal Haymarket	Written by Ivor Novello

== Filmography ==
Year	Title	Role
1920	Colonel Newcombe, the Perfect Gentleman	Col.Newcombe
1920	The Sword of Damocles	Jack Moray
1920	A Gamble in Lives	Harry Riggs
1923	Fires of Innocence	Pen Arkwright
1923	Rogues of the Turf	Arthur Somerton
1924	The Warrens of Virginia	Arthur Warren
1929	The Burgomaster of Stilemonde	Lt. Otto Hilmer
