= Claggett Wilson =

American painter (1887–1952)

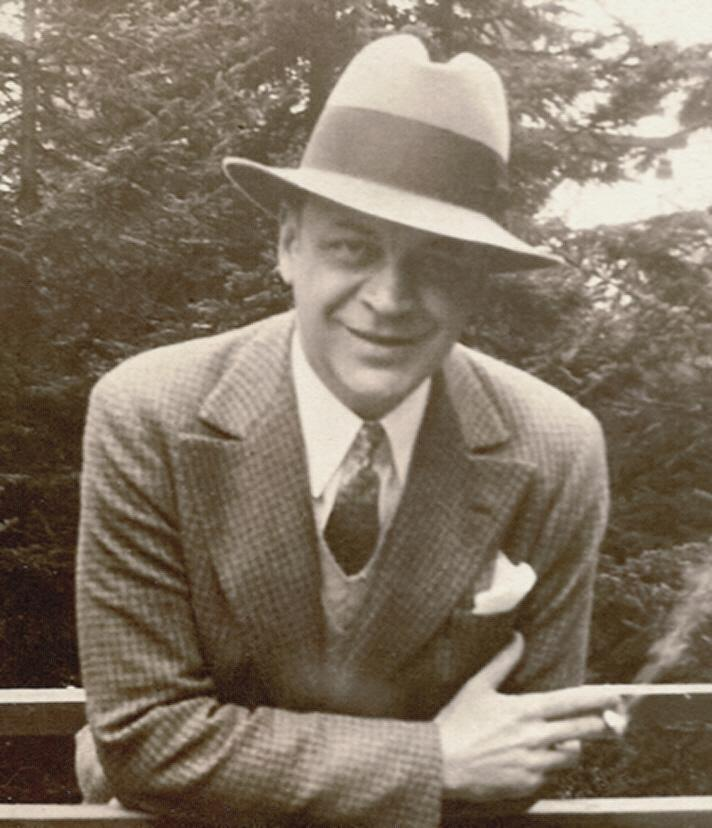
- Claggett Wilson on Squirrel Island in Southport, Maine, where he maintained a summer studio.
- Born: 1887; Washington, D.C., U.S.
- Died: 1952 (aged 64–65)
- Known for: Painting

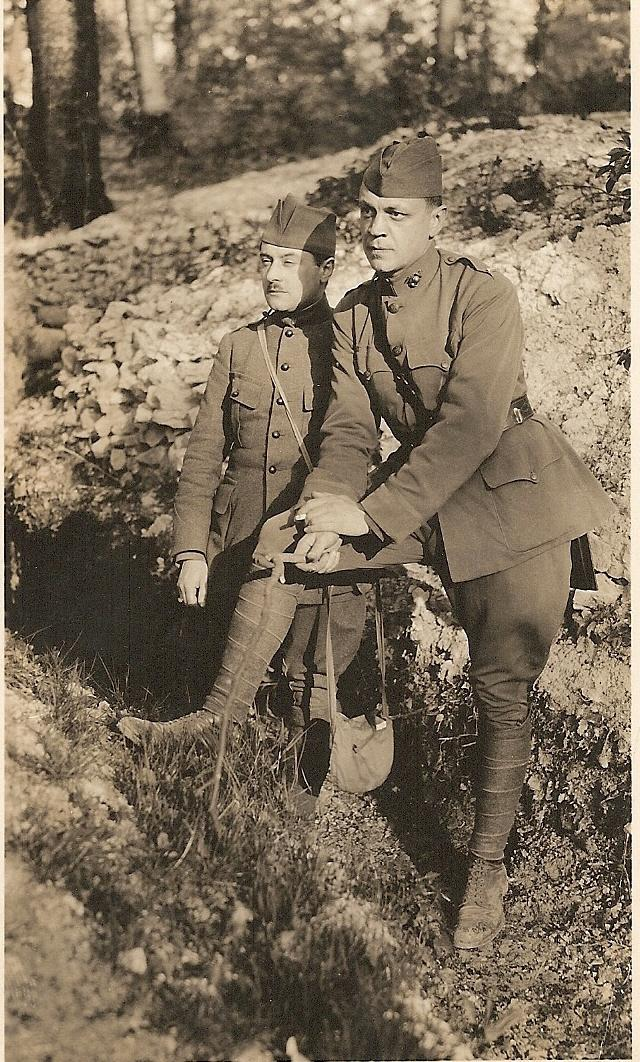
Lieutenant Claggett Wilson, France, 1918

Claggett Wilson (1887–1952) was one of America's first "modernist" painters. Early in his career he taught painting and drawing at Columbia University. After serving as a lieutenant in World War I, Wilson returned from France to document his experiences in a series of war paintings.

== Youth ==
Born in 1887 in Washington, D.C., Wilson eventually made New York City his home. In his teenage years he worked as a cowboy in Arizona, and in England rode to hounds. After a short stay at Princeton University, he lived in Paris from 1906 to 1910, and showed in the Paris Salon.

== World War I ==
Wilson served in World War I as Brigade HQ chief in the 2nd (Indian Head) Division and later, because he spoke fluent French, as aide-de-camp to Brigadier General Wendell Neville. He was wounded twice and never shook the debilitating effects of mustard gas. He was awarded the Navy Cross, the Silver Star, and the Croix de Guerre, and ended up with the golden oak leaf of a major. His war paintings were bequeathed to the Smithsonian American Art Museum by Alice H. Rossin.

== Art ==
Wilson was a portraitist, muralist, and designer–decorator, as well as a costume and set designer. New York's Metropolitan Museum of Art, the Brooklyn Museum, and the Smithsonian American Art Museum own a number of Wilson's paintings.

Patrons of the arts such as Solomon R. Guggenheim, Adolph Lewisohn, Edgar Rossin, James Cox Brady, and Rodney Sharp adorned their walls with his canvases and murals. Alfred Lunt and Lynn Fontanne engaged Wilson in 1935 to design the costumes and sets for The Taming of the Shrew. In 1938 he began a two-year project at the Lunts' home in Wisconsin, Ten Chimneys, painting murals throughout and decorating the historical residence.
