= Ten Chimneys =

Historic house in Wisconsin, United States

- U.S. National Register of Historic Places
- U.S. National Historic Landmark
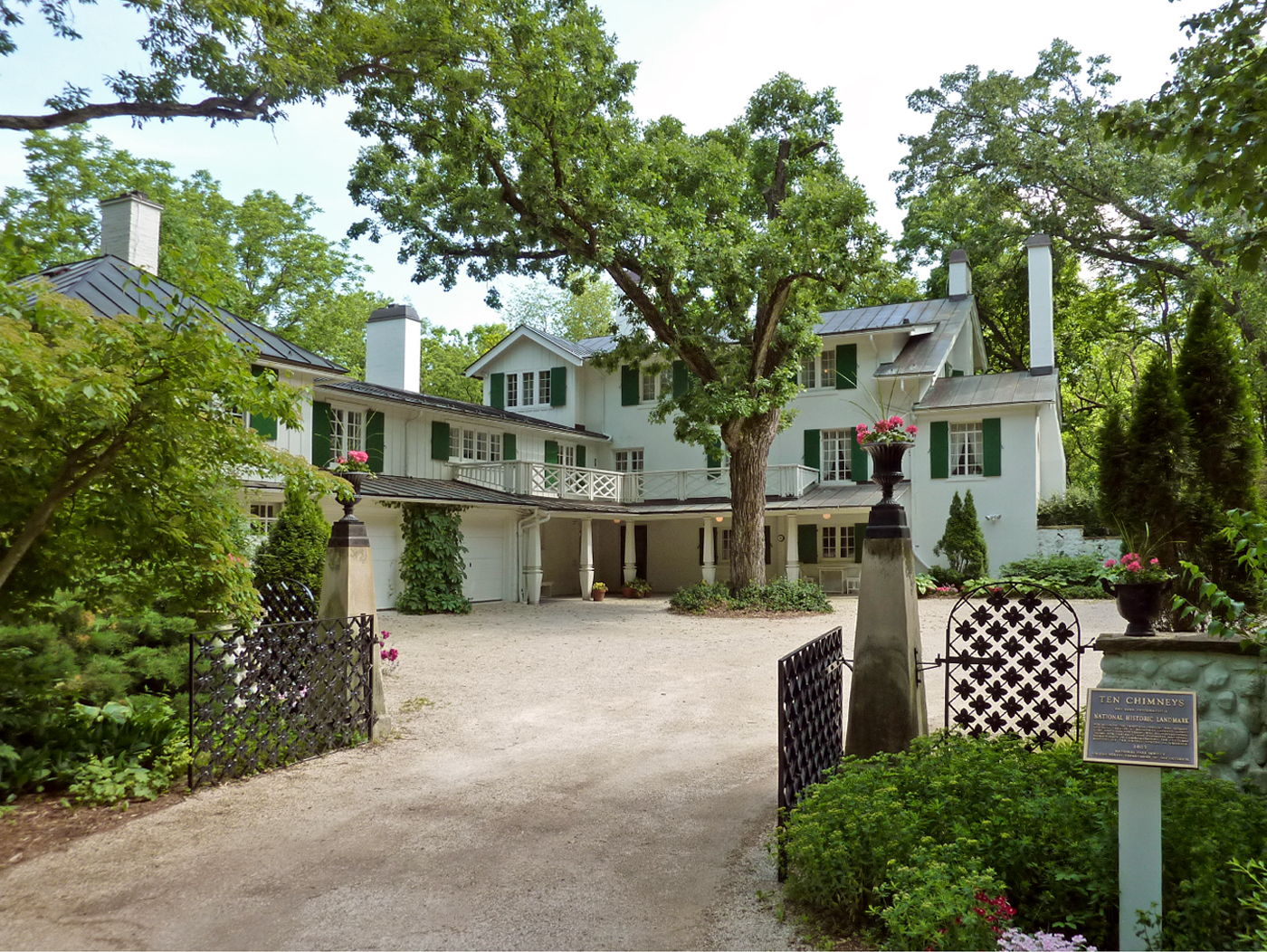
- Entrance to the Main House

- Location within Wisconsin Location within the United States
- Location: S42 W31610 Depot Rd., Genesee, Wisconsin
- Coordinates: 42°57′51″N 88°22′38″W
- Area: 60 acres (24 ha)
- Built: 1915
- Architect: Charles Dornbusch
- Architectural style: Late 19th And 20th Century Revivals
- NRHP reference No.: 98000076

Significant dates
- Added to NRHP: February 23, 1998
- Designated NHL: July 31, 2003

Ten Chimneys was the summer home and gentleman's farm of Broadway actors Lynn Fontanne and Alfred Lunt, and a social center for American theater. The property is located in Genesee Depot in the Town of Genesee in Waukesha County, Wisconsin, United States.

Ten Chimneys was declared a National Historic Landmark in 2003, for the significance of its owners to the history of performing arts, and for its distinctive architecture and decoration.

== History ==
Lynn Fontanne was born in 1887 in England. From childhood she wanted to be an actress, starting as a chorus girl in Cinderella in 1905. In 1916 she came to the U.S., and hit real success playing in Dulcy in 1921.

Alfred Lunt, Jr. was born in 1892 in Milwaukee, the son of a Wisconsin lumberman. He was interested in the theater from the age of three, and enjoyed summers working on his aunt's farm in Neenah. In 1906 Alfred's Swedish-born stepfather moved the family out to the village of Genesee Depot, where he practiced as a physician. But within a few years financial problems forced the family to move to Finland, then a Russian possession, to live with the step-father's family. Alfred spent summers in Finland, learning a fondness for the culture. During the school year he attended Carroll College Academy back in Waukesha, then started at Carroll College, where he majored in oratory, appeared in college plays, and designed, built, and painted scenery. In 1912 he left Carroll and headed east to join a theater company in Boston, where he eventually became a successful stage actor, achieving acclaim in Booth Tarkington's play Clarence in 1919.

Despite his successful, cosmopolitan career, Alfred remained fond of his childhood home in Wisconsin. In 1913 he bought three acres near Genesee Depot that would become Ten Chimneys. In 1915 he had the first section of the house built, described by a visitor as "one enormous room with staircases leading up to a gallery which had doors leading to bedrooms." Alfred's mother Hattie and his half-siblings lived there year-round, and he joined them in the summers.

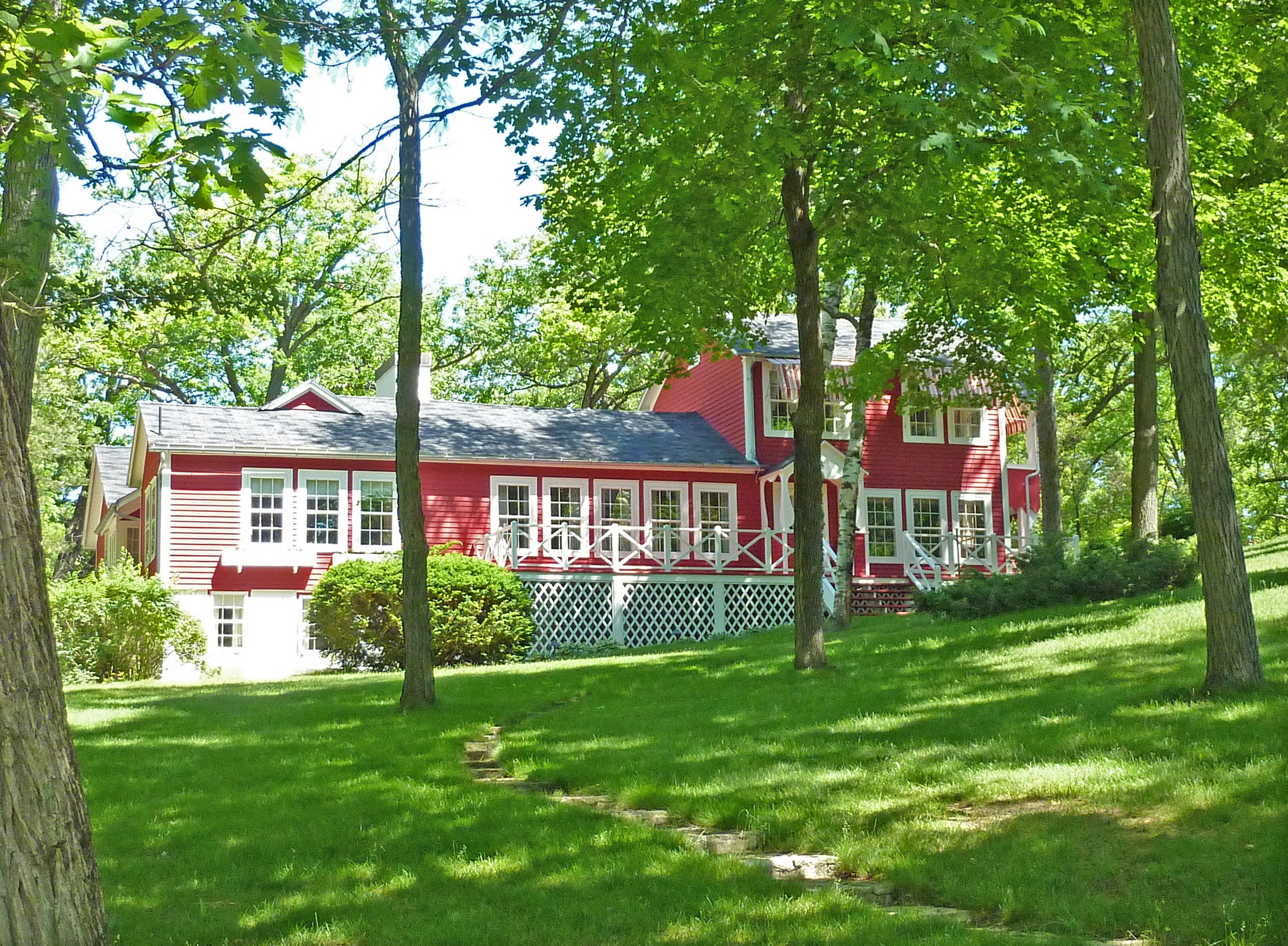
The Cottage, expanded from a chicken coop.

Lunt and Fontanne fell in love in 1919 when they met backstage at a rehearsal in New York, and they married in 1922. The couple's first summer at home with Alfred's mother was strained and in 1924 they set about expanding the chicken coop into a cottage for themselves to live in. The resulting cottage has many details drawn from traditional Swedish farmhouses: corner brick and stucco fireplaces with sloping chimney wings, folk paintings (some painted by Lunt himself), and inscriptions in Swedish throughout the cottage. The exception is Lynn Fontanne's room upstairs, which is white on white, with a carpet of stitched sheepskins.

In 1923 Lunt and Fontanne appeared in their first play together, Sweet Nell of Old Drury. The following year they appeared together in the play The Guardsman, which was highly acclaimed and which they later made into a movie. Over the years they starred together in over 140 Broadway plays, and were considered the first family of American theater.

In 1932 Lunt and Fontanne swapped houses with his mother and sister, with Lunt and Fontanne moving into the main house and his mother and sister moving to the Cottage. With that, Lunt renamed the Cottage the "hen house."

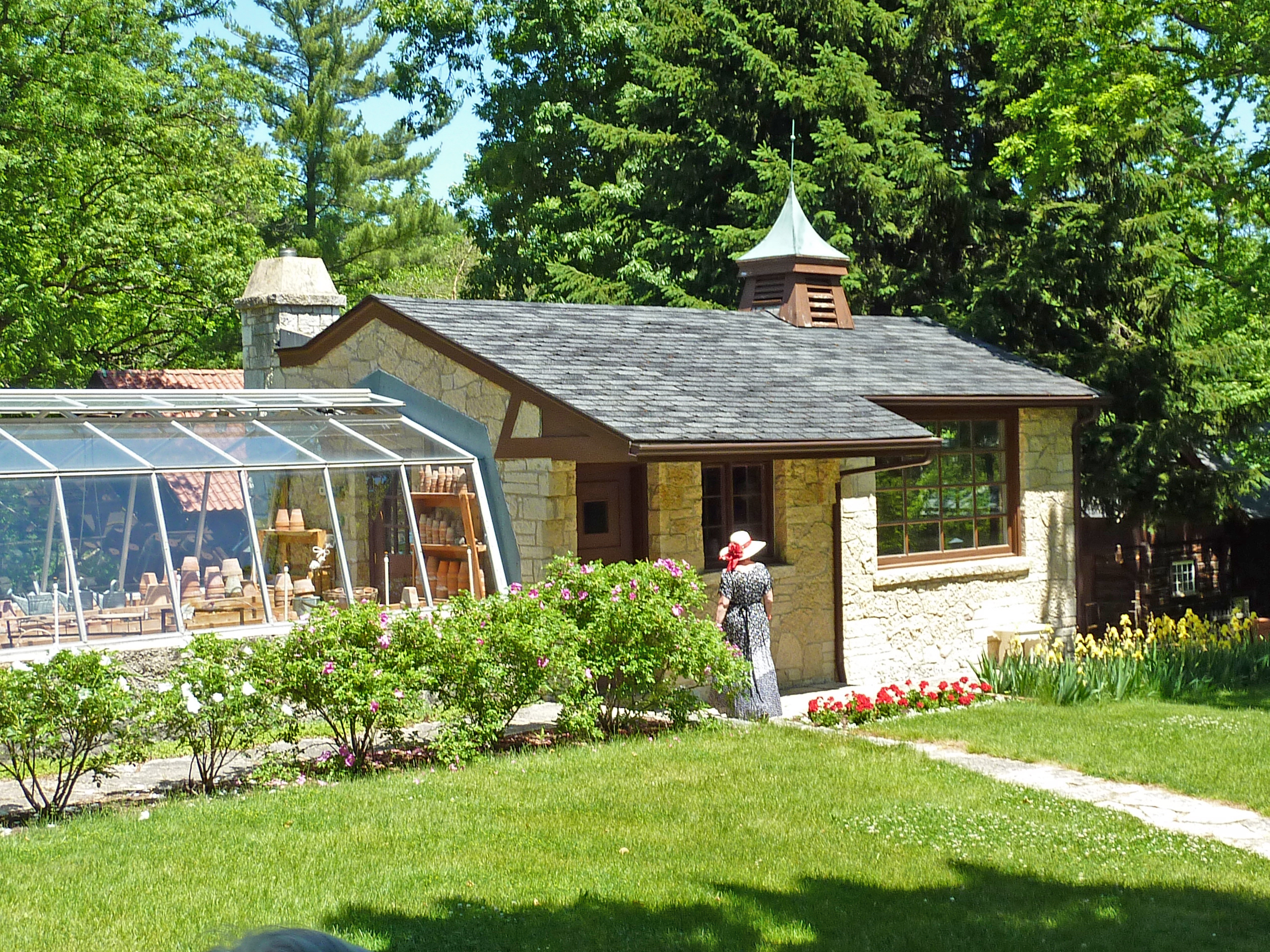
The greenhouse and new chicken coop.

Over the years Lunt and Fontanne continued building and developing at Ten Chimneys. In 1936 they added the L-shaped swimming pool and the cabana. In 1938 they began remodeling and expanding the house, adding quarters for the cook and housekeeper and extra living space. The design was a collaboration between Lunt and architect Charles Dornbusch of Loebl, Schlossman and Demuth of Chicago, who helped with most of the structures on the estate, including the cottage fourteen years before. In 1939 they added the metal gate around the auto court. In 1947 they completed the new chicken coop (designed with advice from a specialist at the UW Ag Department) and greenhouse, and the gatehouse. Also in 1947 they reconstructed the Studio, a traditional hewn-log building that was taken apart in Sweden, shipped to America, and reassembled for use as a rehearsal space. Flagstone paths and retaining walls were added later to tie the estate together.

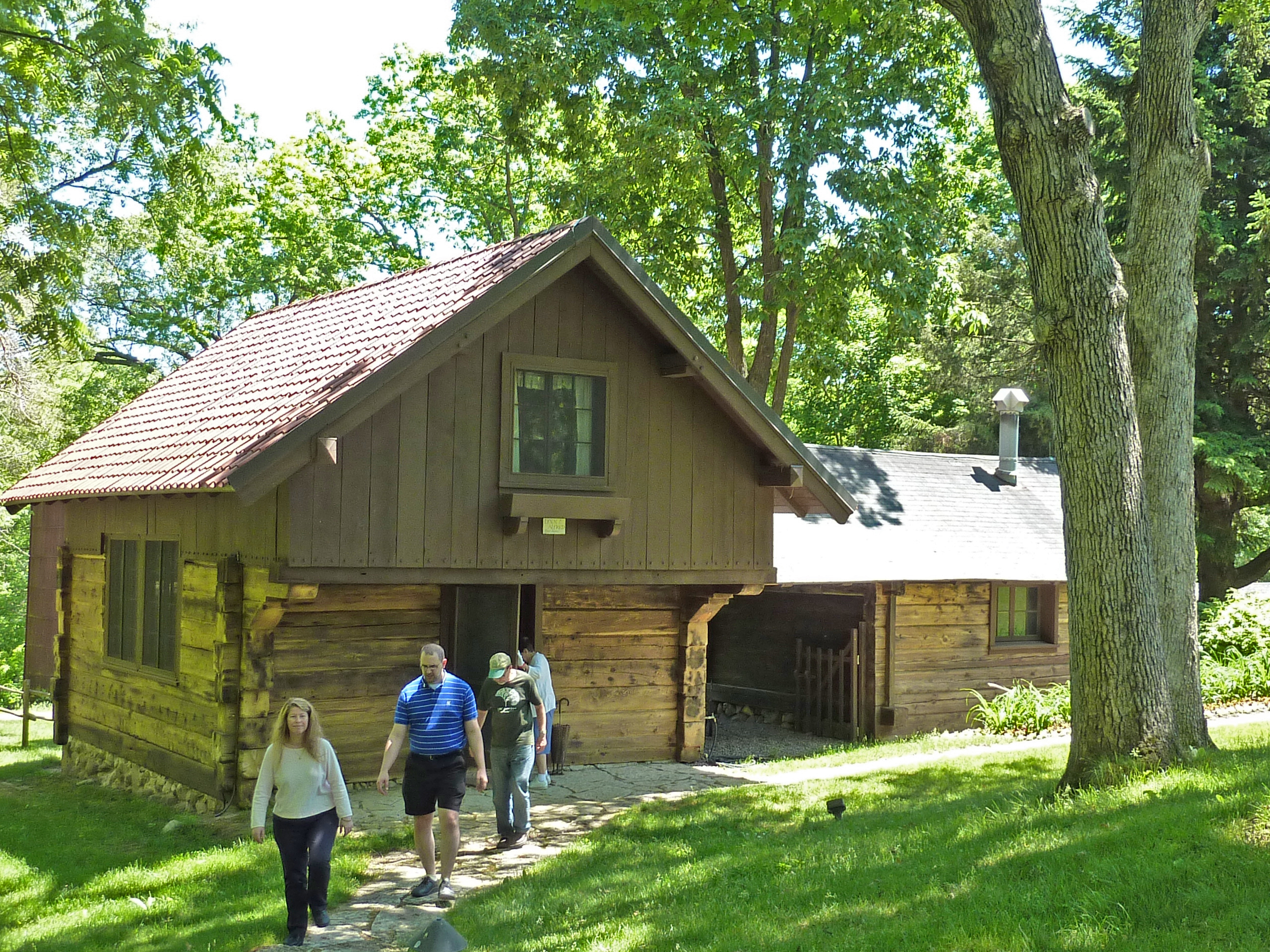
The Studio

In his NRHP nomination, Jim Draeger states "the crowning jewel of Ten Chimneys is the finely decorated and furnished interior of the main house." The entry hall features marble tile, hand-painted murals on the walls, a porcelain Swedish stove, and a dramatic spiral staircase that leads to the second level. On that level are the kitchen and what the Lunts called the Flirtation Room, which leads to other parts of the house, including the Music Room, with a fireplace and hand-painted murals depicting Biblical scenes like baby Moses among the bullrushes. The murals were painted by artist Claggett Wilson starting in 1938, when the house was expanded. The library has a secret passage through a bookshelf. The upper level contains bedrooms, with murals showing peasants farming and wildlife. Lynn's bedroom is again colored light, with a Swedish fireplace. Alfred's bedroom is simpler, also with its own Swedish corner fireplace. The many fireplaces require the ten chimneys which give the estate its name.

Ten Chimneys was also a farm, though that may seem hard to reconcile with a Flirtation Room. As a child Lunt enjoyed working in the fields and that continued as an adult. Once while visiting the Oliviers in England, he wrote home: "...I had a high old time as their garden was full of weeds & did I go to it..." From the initial three acres, the farm at Ten Chimneys grew to over 100. Lunt was absent much of the year, so in 1929 he hired Ben Perkins of Mukwonago as overseer. While Lunt was away, he and Perkins exchanged letters about matters like the used silo filler they bought for $65. (Lunt was cost-conscious.) They started a large vegetable garden in 1939 and an orchard later. In 1941, Alfred and Lynn bought each other cows as Christmas gifts - the first two cows on the farm. In 1942 the farm included four cows, some pigs and up to 200 chickens. To support the animals, they grew 6 acres of corn, 7 acres of oats, four of alfalfa, one of clover and 3/4 acres of wheat. The milk from the cows was made into butter, with some eaten on the farm and some sold locally. Some butter, meat and vegetables were shipped to the Lunts in New York and even in Europe during WWII, when rationing made them hard to obtain otherwise. Alfred recalled in 1956:

I'm just a country boy who happens to be an actor. But fashionable parties and clever talk - all that sort of thing - well, y'know, it bores me stiff. I'd rather listen to my chickens clucking any time.

During their careers, Fontanne and Lunt retreated to Ten Chimneys every summer for personal and artistic rejuvenation. A host of stage and screen luminaries made pilgrimages to Genesee Depot as guests of the Lunts, including Noël Coward, Helen Hayes, Orson Welles, Laurence Olivier, and Vivien Leigh. Carol Channing said, "If you get to go to Ten Chimneys, you must have done something right."

Upon retirement, the Lunts returned to Ten Chimneys and spent the rest of their lives at their beloved home in Genesee Depot, with Alfred dying in 1977 and Lynn in 1983.

=== Opening to the public ===
In 1996 arts advocate Joseph W. Garton, a restaurateur in Madison, Wisconsin, purchased Ten Chimneys, and Ten Chimneys Foundation was established to preserve and share the estate. The foundation then purchased the property from Garton in 1998.

As a historic property, the estate was exceptionally well preserved, since the Lunts' original furniture, decorations, and personal items were barely disturbed between Lynn Fontanne's death in 1983 and the beginning of preservation efforts by Ten Chimneys Foundation in 1998.

Ten Chimneys Foundation opened the estate to the public for the first time on May 26, 2003, which would have been the Lunts' 81st wedding anniversary. The estate remains open for public tours from May through November. Ten Chimneys Foundation also continues to fulfill the estate's original role as a home for the arts by providing programming and resources for theater professionals.

== Gallery ==
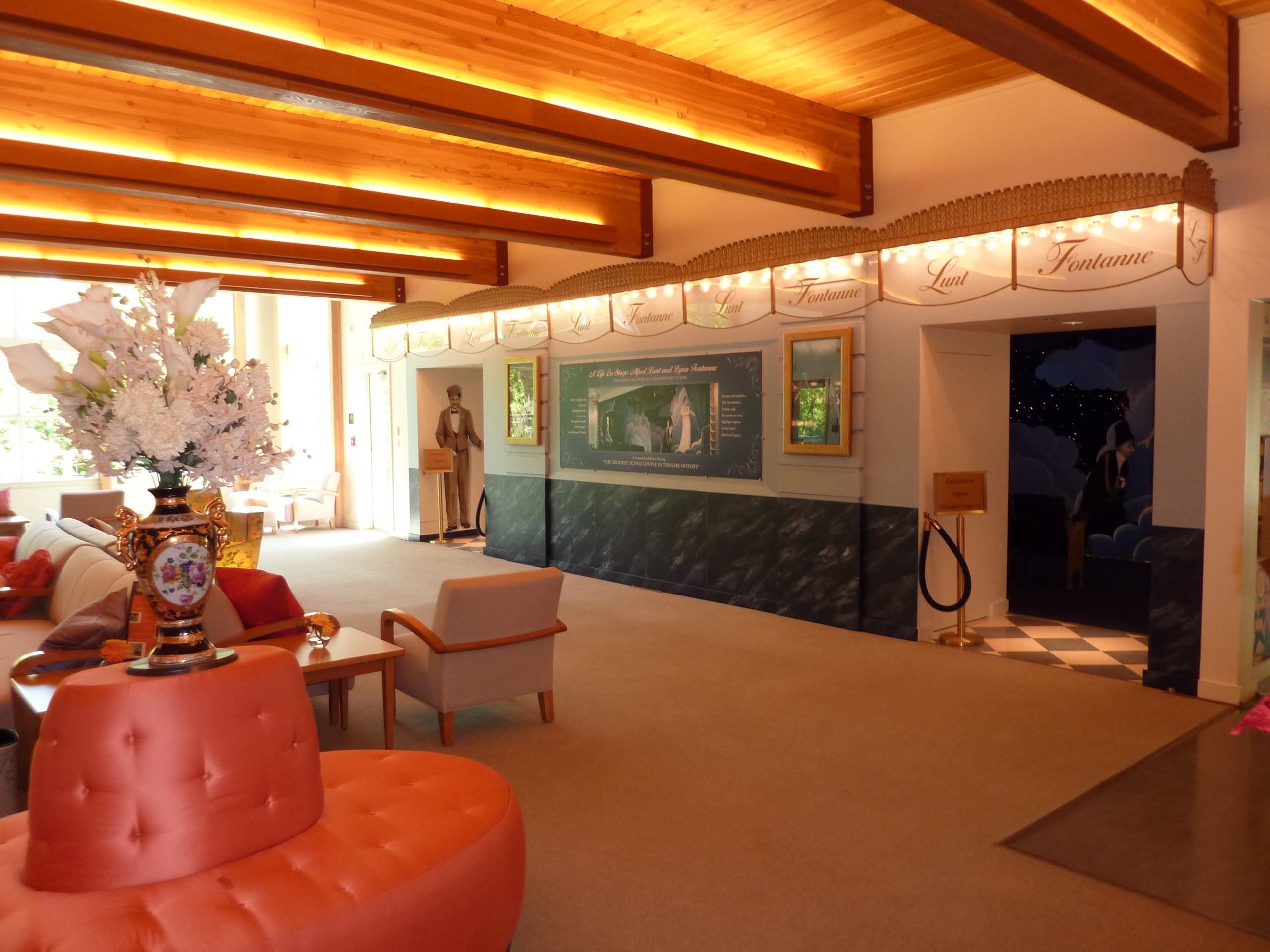
The Visitor Center

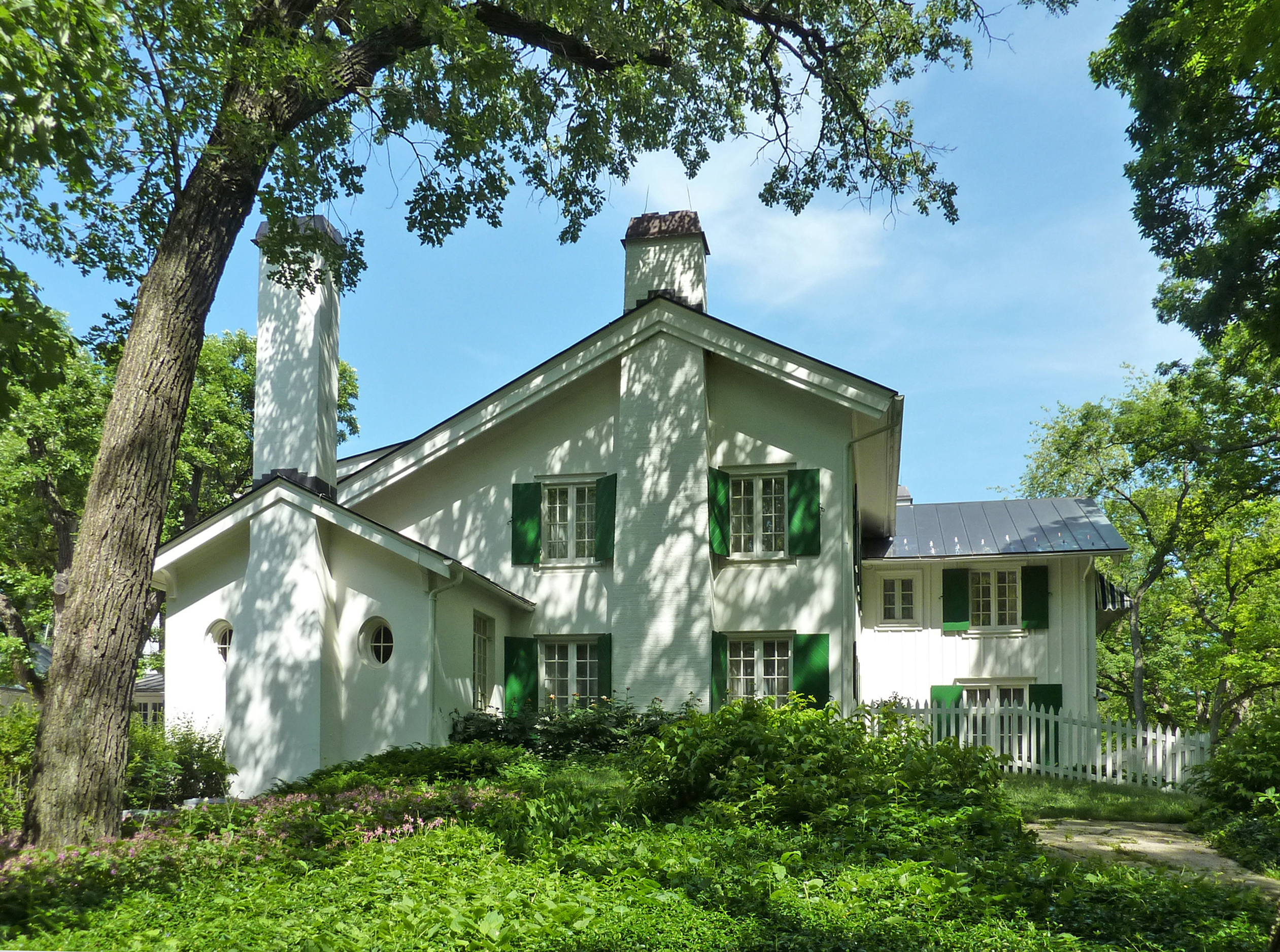
The Main House

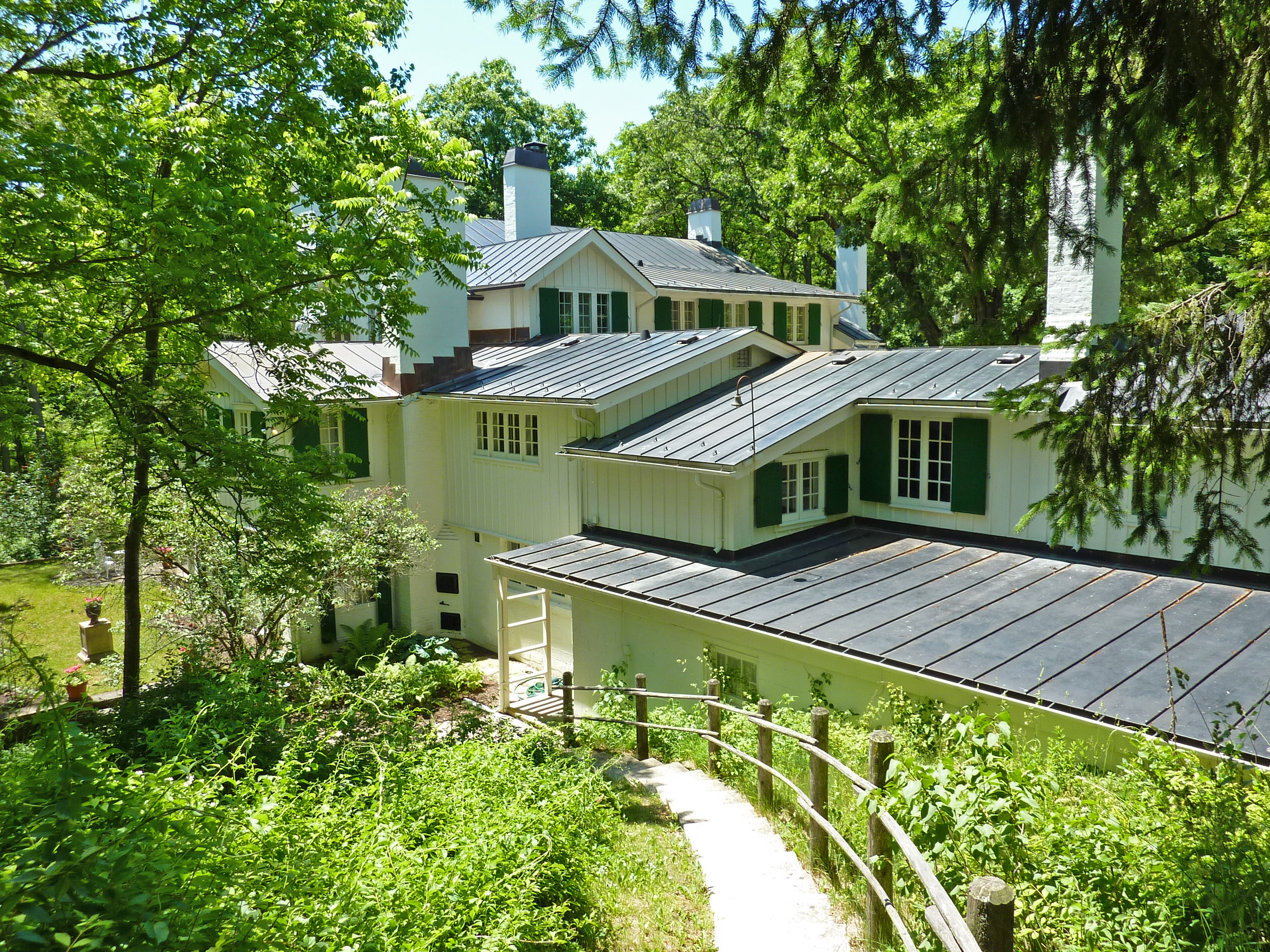
The Main House, Rear

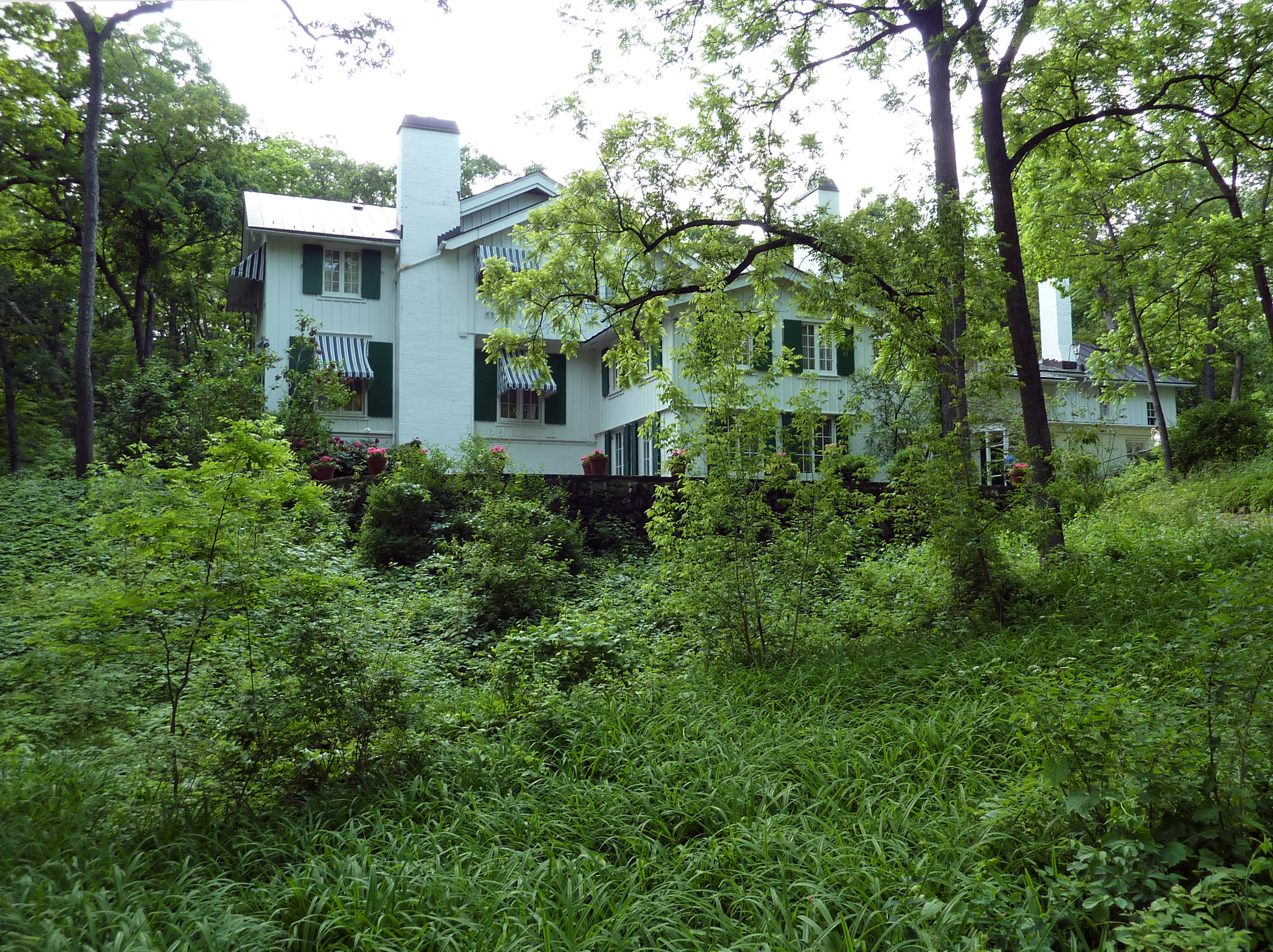
The Main House, Rear

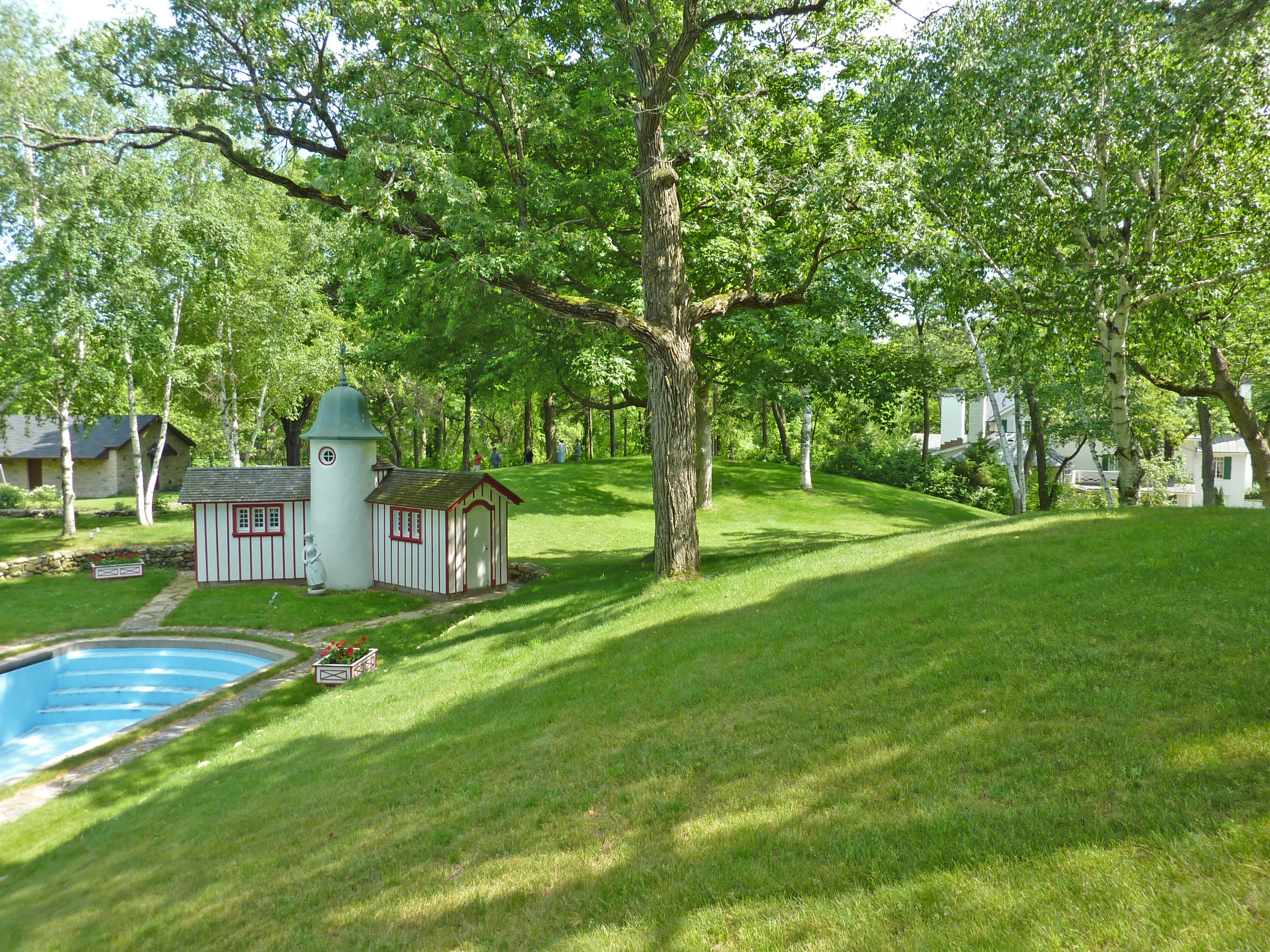
The poolhouse

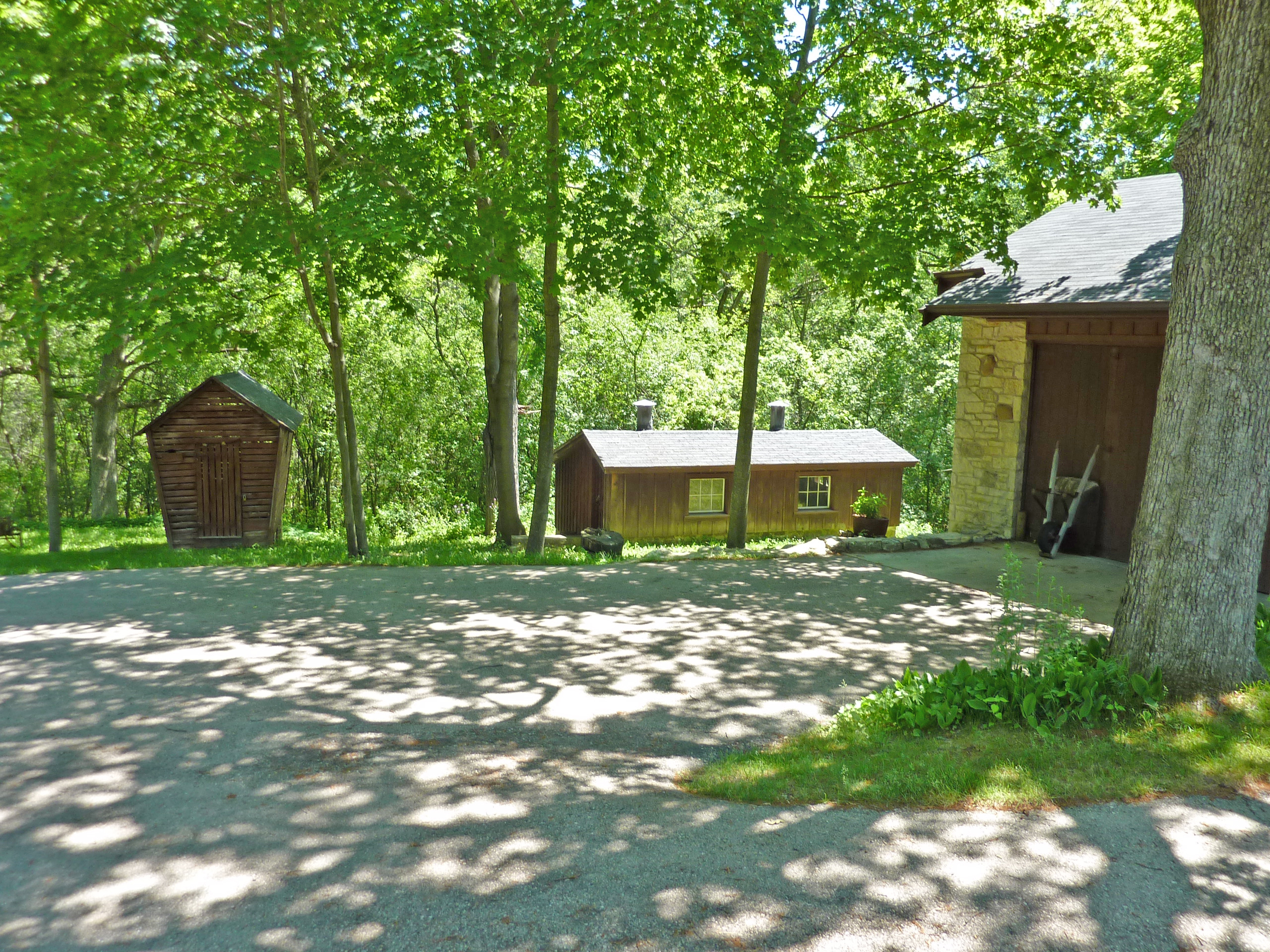
Outbuildings

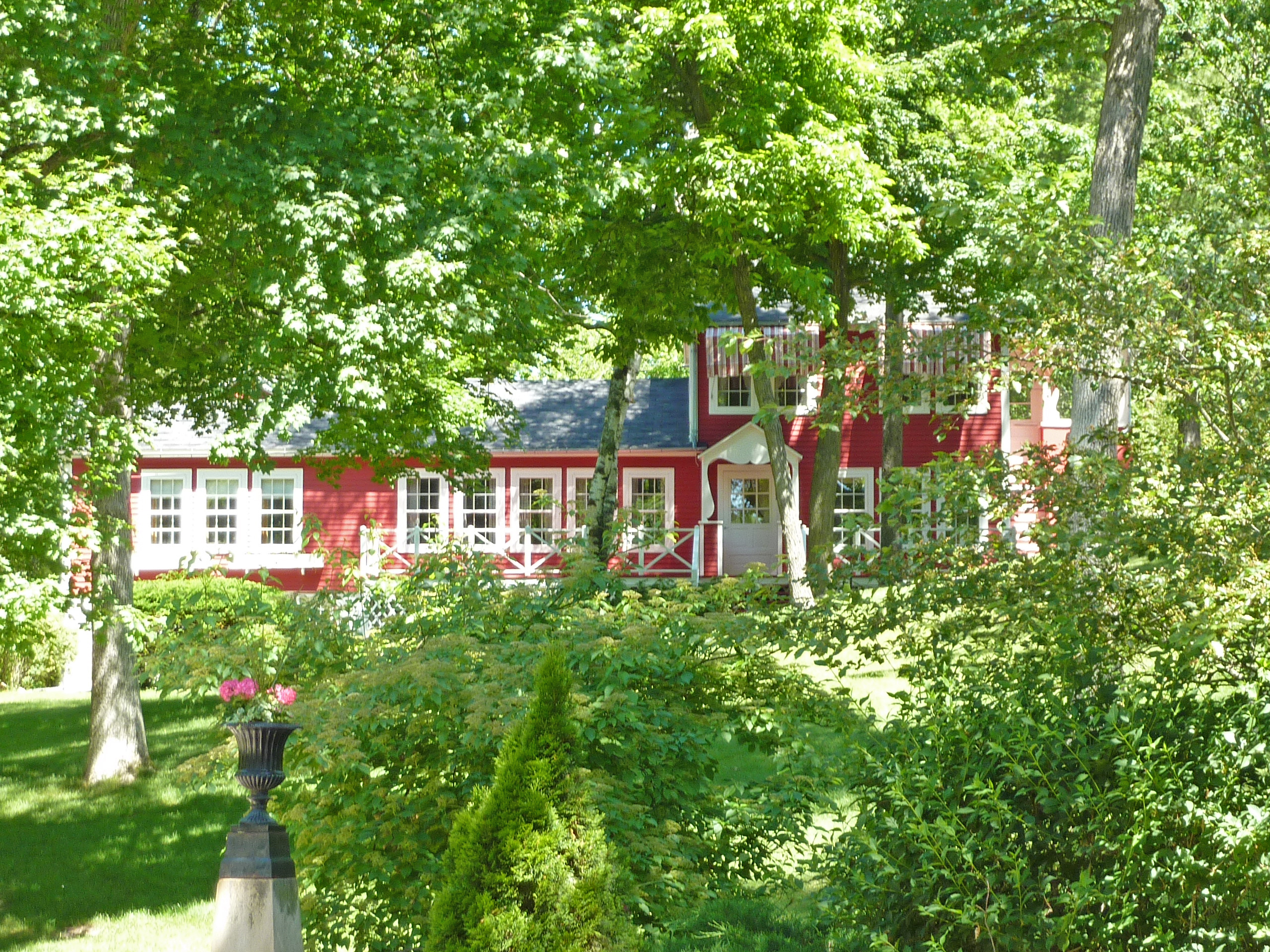
The Cottage

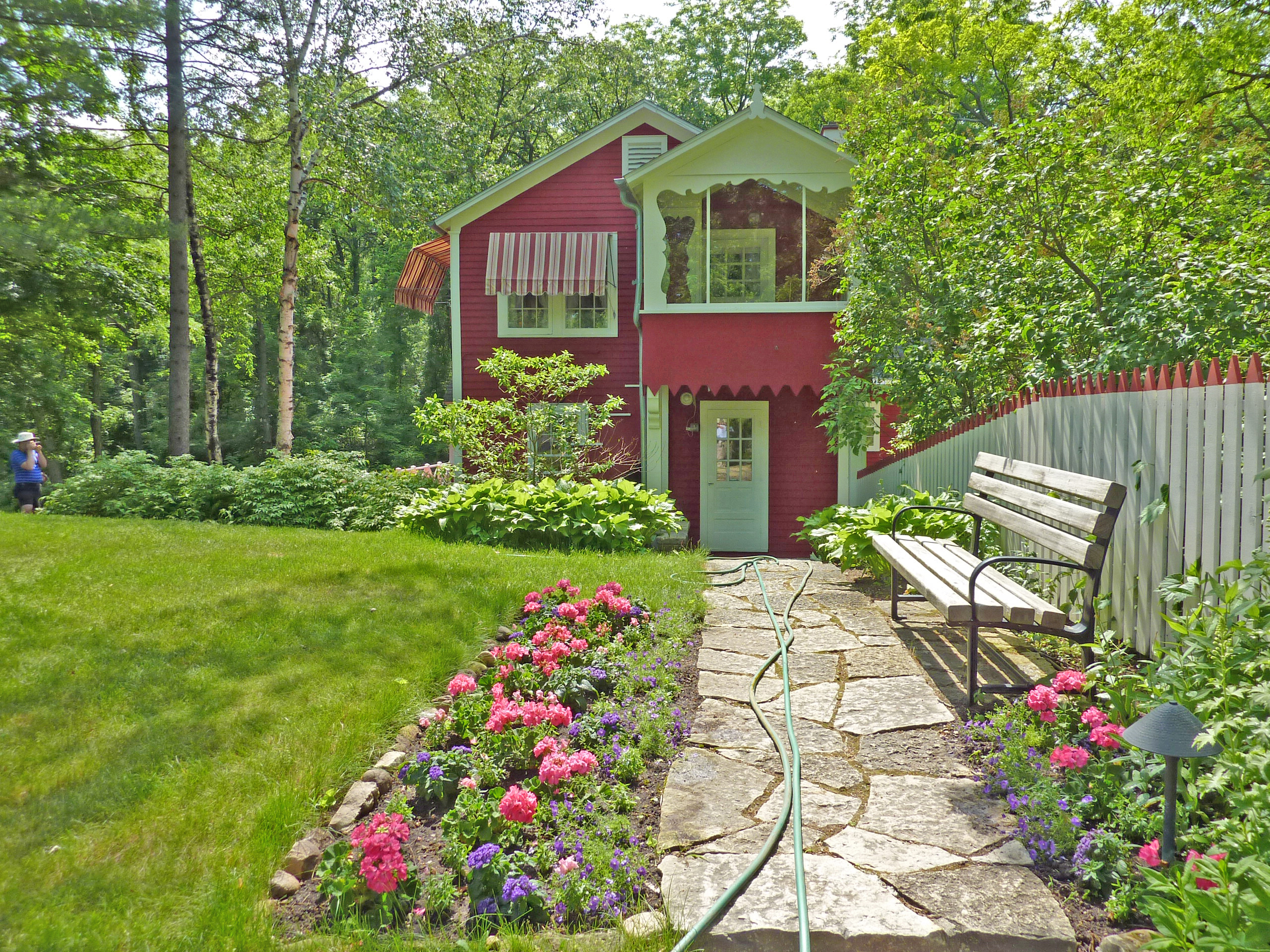
The Cottage

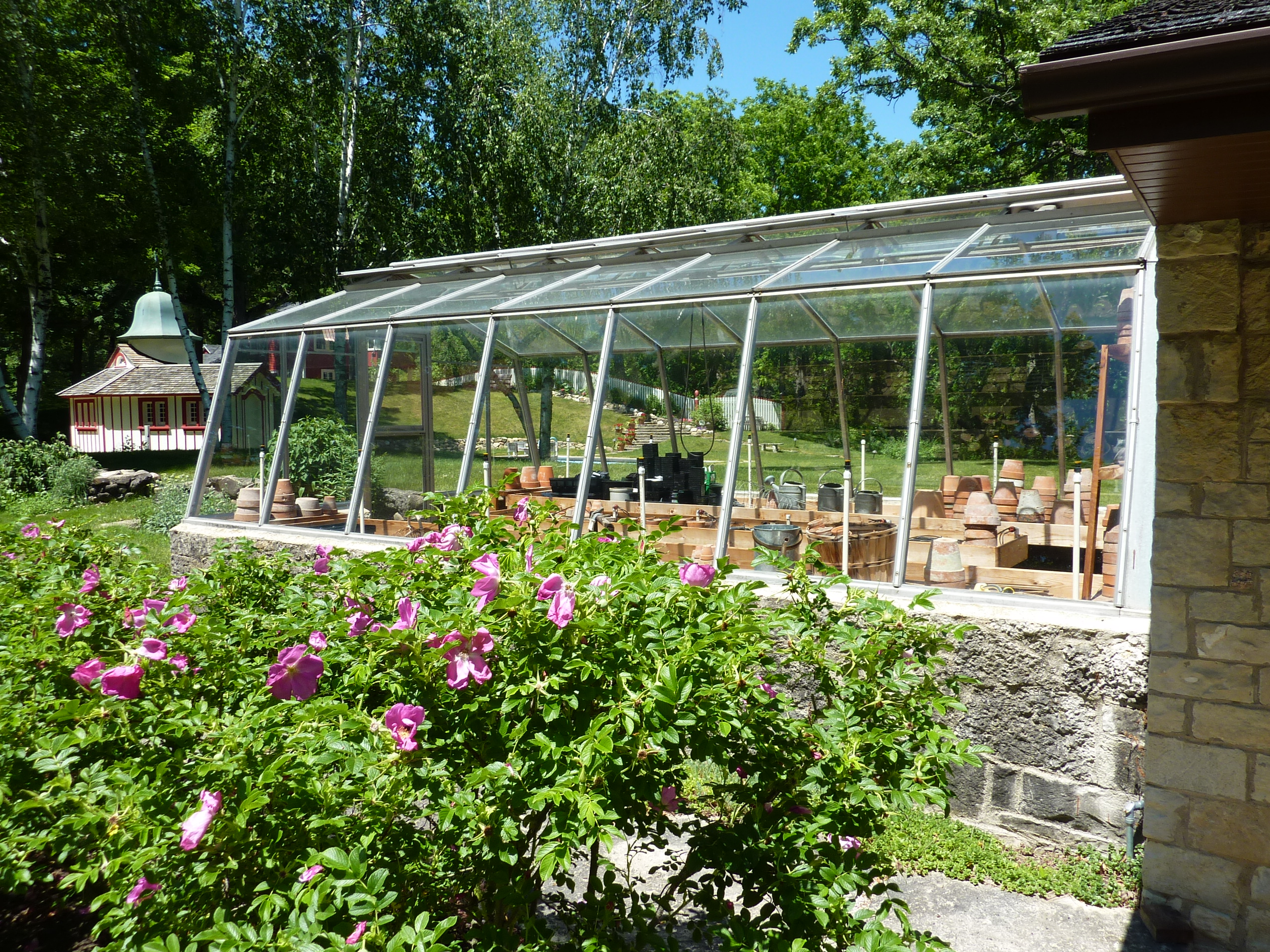
The greenhouse

== See also ==
- List of National Historic Landmarks in Wisconsin
- National Register of Historic Places listings in Waukesha County, Wisconsin
