= Love In Idleness =

Comedy play by Terence Rattigan

Love In Idleness is a 1944 comedy play by the British writer Terence Rattigan. A young man with radical left-wing views returns from Canada to discover to his horror that his mother is in a relationship with a wealthy businessman currently serving as Minister for Tank Production.

It was staged in New York with the title O Mistress Mine.

== Original production ==
The play opened (following a pre-London tour) at the Lyric Theatre, London, on 20 December 1944, with the following cast:

- Olivia Brown - Lynn Fontanne
- Polton - Margaret Murray
- Miss Dell - Peggy Dear
- Sir John Fletcher - Alfred Lunt
- Michael Brown - Brian Nissen
- Diana Fletcher - Kathleen Kent
- Celia Wentworth - Mona Harrison
- Sir Thomas Markham - Frank Forder
- Lady Markham - Antoinette Keith

== Bibliography ==
- John Russell Taylor. The Rise and Fall of the Well-Made Play. Routledge, 2013.
