= Genesee Depot, Wisconsin =

- Unincorporated community
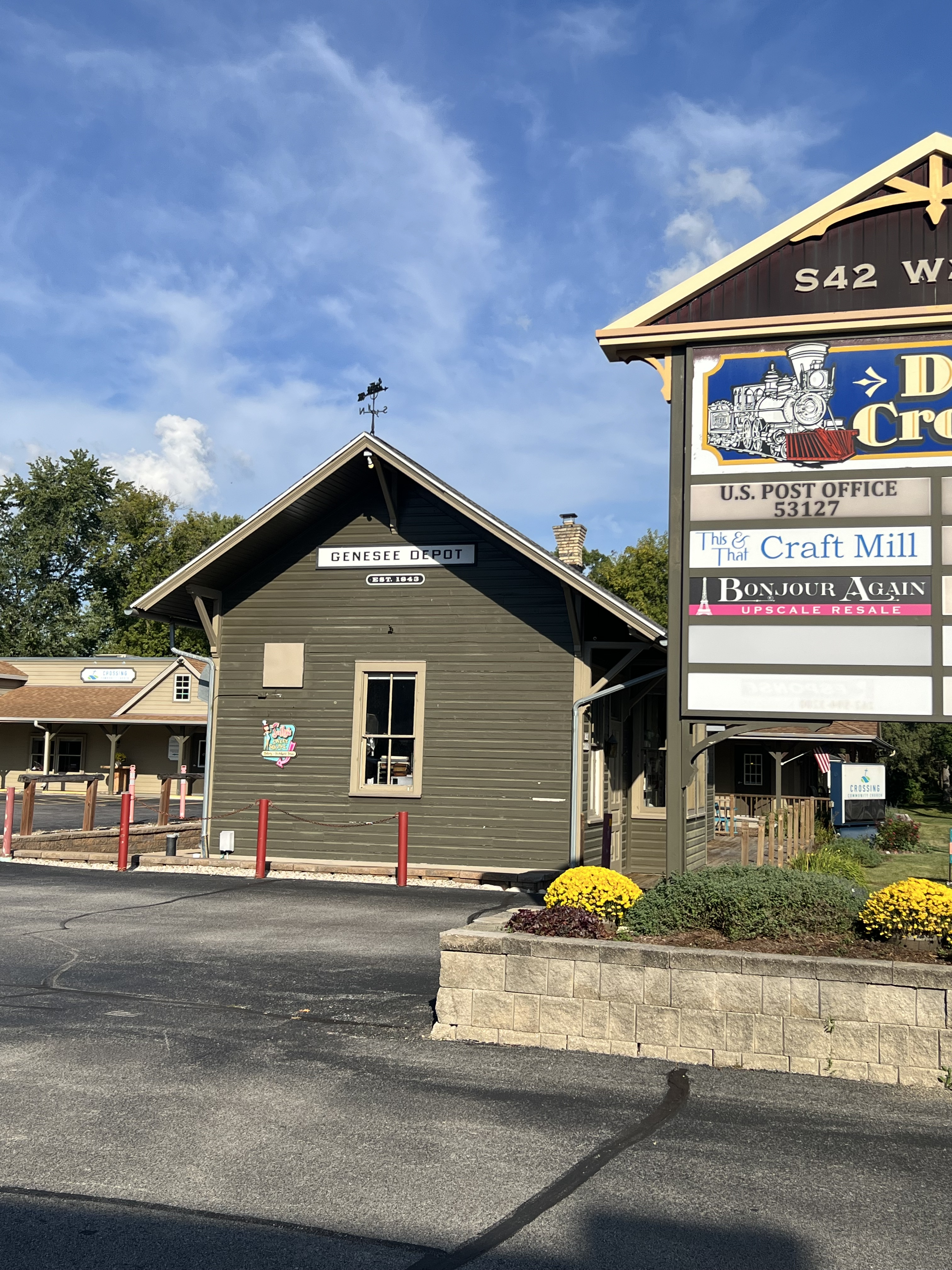

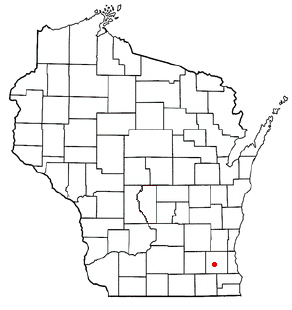
- Location of Genesee Depot, Wisconsin
- Coordinates: 42°58′00″N 88°22′16″W
- Country: United States
- State: Wisconsin
- County: Waukesha
- Elevation: 909 ft (277 m)
- Time zone: UTC-6 (Central (CST))
  - Summer (DST): UTC-5 (CDT)
- ZIP Code: 53127
- Area code: 262
- GNIS feature ID: 1565457

Genesee Depot is a small unincorporated community in Waukesha County, Wisconsin, United States. It is in the Town of Genesee, in southeastern Wisconsin between Milwaukee and Madison, and named for the train station, or depot, of the Wisconsin and Calumet Railroad (now the Wisconsin and Southern Railroad) that formerly served the town.

== History ==
Genesee Depot was founded mainly by German, Welsh, Irish, and English immigrants in the late 19th century. Stillman Smith was the first to settle in the area in the summer of 1837. In 1838 Benjamin A. Jenkins built a log cabin inn at what is now the intersection of Hwys. 59 and 83. It served travelers going to and from Milwaukee. Jenkins later built a three-story mill and wagon factory. "By the 1890s there was a grain elevator, slaughter house, two stores, blacksmith shop, shoe shop, woolen factory, post office, lumber yard, and train depot with ticket, baggage, and waiting rooms, [and] storage buildings."

Genesee Depot garnered attention as a result of the Milwaukee & Mississippi Railroad through the community. The Johnston Quarry was started in 1842 on what is now WI 59. It provided jobs and led to the development of business in the area. The quarry provided the stone for many Wisconsin buildings, including the Wisconsin State Capitol, the Milwaukee Sentinel building, and the early buildings for Carroll University.

=== Historic sites ===
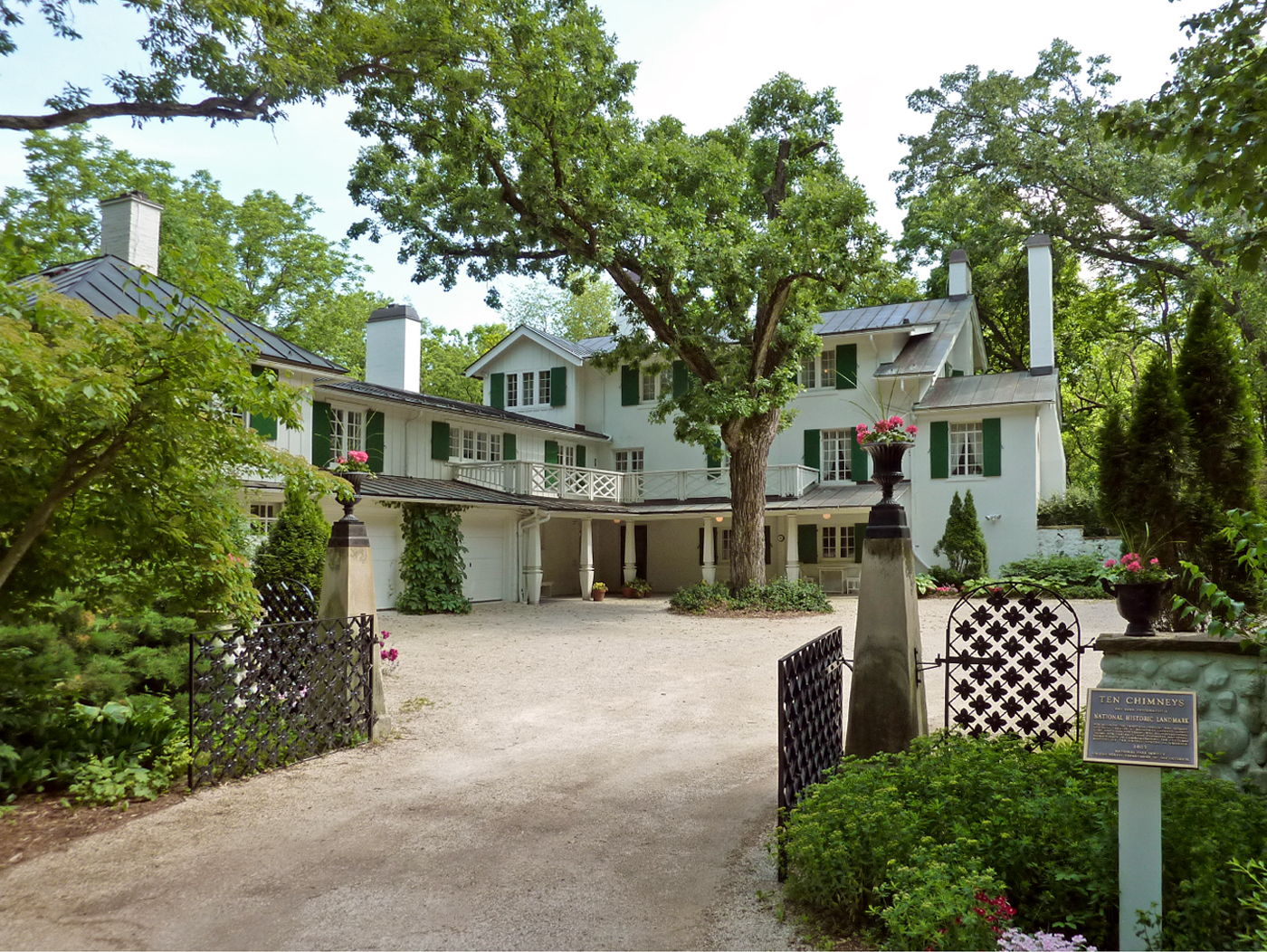
Ten Chimneys

Many buildings in Genesee Depot are the originals from the late 19th and early 20th centuries, including "the original section of St. Paul's Catholic Church (Hwy 83 & D), built in the early 1870s; the James Proctor House (Hwy 83 by bridge spanning Genesee Creek) also dating back to the 1860s, behind which stood the Genesee Woolen Mill; and the new railroad depot built in 1897 after the first one burned down. This station building was relocated slightly south of where it originally stood on Hwy 83 and currently is Mama D's Coffee shop."; this business is currently known as Mama D's Coffee Shop. The original town hall, now the Wales-Genesee Lions and Lioness Club, was built in 1912 and is on the National Register of Historic Places.

Another historic site in Genesee Depot is Ten Chimneys, the home of Alfred Lunt and Lynn Fontanne, so known because among the three buildings on the site, there are ten chimneys. Lunt and Fontanne's residence in Genesee Depot was their summer home and a popular gathering place for theater people. It is decorated with original pieces and collections of the Lunts from the early 20th century. It is now open as a house museum.

== Education ==
Magee Elementary, in the Kettle Moraine School District, serves students in grades K-5. Named after John Magee, who helped bring the railroad through Genesee Depot, the school was completed and opened in 1922. It was remodeled in 1989 to accommodate a larger enrollment, which stands at about 320 students.

== Churches ==
=== St. Paul Parish ===
St. Paul Roman Catholic Parish, part of the Archdiocese of Milwaukee, was founded in 1863. In 1961 a new church was built down the road from the original site to accommodate the growing congregation. A K-8 school was also built, and remodeled in 1997. In 2006 the second church was demolished and a new one completed in the fall of 2007.
