= Quadrille (play) =

Play written by Noël Coward

Lynn Fontanne as Lady Heronden

Quadrille is a play by Noël Coward. It is a romantic comedy set in the mid-Victorian era, and depicts the romantic permutations when an English aristocrat elopes with the wife of an American businessman and the American falls in love with the aristocrat's deserted wife.

The play premiered in London in 1952, starring Lynn Fontanne and Alfred Lunt. It played on Broadway in 1955, with the same two players in the lead roles.

== History ==
After a provincial tour beginning at the Manchester Opera House on 15 July 1952, the play opened at the Phoenix Theatre in London on 12 September 1952 and ran until 27 June 1953. The play starred Coward's friends Lynn Fontanne and Alfred Lunt, with Griffith Jones, Marian Spencer and Sylvia Coleridge. The costumes and scenery were by Cecil Beaton and the play was directed by the author. It was fairly successful, running for 329 performances, but failed to match the outstanding popularity of his biggest pre-war hits.

The Manchester Guardian praised the play for breaking away from Coward’s customary terse style and experimenting with romantic comedy "affectionate and sincere as well as amusing and elegant". The Times was unimpressed, describing the piece as "romantic fustian". Many of the reviews thought the plot derivative of Coward's pre-war hit, Private Lives. The acting of Fontanne and Lunt, however, was consistently praised, though The Daily Express called the production "a waste of expensive talent".

Lunt won a Tony Award for best actor in the 1955 Broadway production, which also starred Fontanne and featured Brian Aherne, Edna Best and Jerome Kilty. The Broadway run lasted for 159 performances and could have profitably run for longer, but the Lunts preferred to close in March 1955.

== Original cast ==
- The Rev Edgar Spevin – John Gill
- Sarah, his wife – Moya Nugent
- Gwendolyn, his daughter – Pamela Grant
- Waiter – Michael Allinson
- Courier – Timothy Forbes Adam
- The Marquess of Heronden (Hubert) – Griffith Jones
- Mrs Axel Diensen (Charlotte) – Marian Spencer
- Catchpole, a butler – Gordon Phillott
- The Marchioness of Heronden (Serena) – Lynn Fontanne
- Lady Harriet Ripley – Joyce Carey
- Foster, a maid – Sybil Wise
- Footman – Rhoderick Walker
- Axel Diensen – Alfred Lunt
- Octavia, Countess of Bonnington – Sylvia Coleridge
- Waiter – Charles Rennison
- Travellers, etc – Allegra Nicole, Derek Prouse, Betty Hare, Gillian Raine, Richard Scott and Dorothy Blythe.

== Plot ==
=== Act I ===
==== Scene I: The Buffet de la Gare, Boulogne. Early morning, May, 1873. ====
A uniformed Courier ushers in Hubert, Marquess of Heronden and Mrs Axel Diensen (Charlotte). They have left their spouses and are eloping together. Charlotte is edgy and worries that Hubert's wife Serena, and her own husband, an American railway magnate, will pursue them. She is also apprehensive about how she and Hubert will be received by the English community in Nice, where they are heading. Also in the buffet are an English clergyman, Mr Spevin and his family, en route to Nice, where he has been appointed Vicar of the English church at Nice. His wife spots that the woman with Hubert is not the Marchioness. Their train arrives and they embark.

==== Scene 2: Serena's Sitting-room in Heronden House, Belgrave Square. Some hours later. ====
Serena, Lady Heronden has returned from the country with her friend, Lady Harriet Ripley. The butler tells her that the Marquess has left a note for her. She opens it but does not reveal its contents to her inquisitive friend. Harriet leaves as an unexpected visitor, Axel Diensen, arrives. He reveals that his wife and the Marquess have eloped. He suggests the both follow the eloping couple; Serena is reluctant at first but he persuades her and they agree to take the night train for the Continent.

=== Act II ===
==== Scene 1: The Villa Zodiaque, St. Guillaume des Fleurs, France. Two days later. ====
Hubert and Charlotte find that the first rapture has worn off their romance. Hubert's attempts to soothe Charlotte are interrupted by the arrival of Serena and Axel. Serena announces her intention of staying to lunch and then indefinitely, despite Hubert's attempts to dissuade her. Hubert takes Charlotte out on to the terrace. Serena asks Axel if he is not afraid to leave them together under the sky. He comments wryly "They'll be back soon. It is beginning to rain." They look at each other and smile.

==== Scene 2: The same. The next morning. ====
Axel and Serena are still at the villa. She insists on a serious talk with Charlotte, warning her that Hubert has had short infatuations before and may well go off the idea of the elopement when reality sinks in. When Charlotte is alone Hubert enters. She tells him that Serena asked if she truly loved him, and having seen him at close quarters her answer is "No". She is ready to return to London with her husband. She makes a dignified exit, while Hubert struts off in a rage. Serena and Axel seem to have won, but are emotionally exhausted. They are interrupted by Octavia, Countess of Bonnington, an eccentric elderly neighbour. Having heard that a pair of illicit lovers are at the Villa, she assumes they are Serena and Axel, and proceeds to congratulate them, ignoring all Serena's attempts to explain the situation. Finally, she dashes out with an invitation to visit her at her Villa la Joie. Axel, who has taken a liking to her, raises his glass and drinks to her. Serena says he must be as mad as Lady Bonnington.

==== Scene 3: The same. Some hours later. ====
The two couples, in their travelling clothes, are drinking coffee. The atmosphere is rather strained as they wait for the carriage to take them to the station. Charlotte goes to pack, leaving Serena and Axel together. In a long, intimate talk, he describes his early days: how he started work at thirteen and gradually made a fortune. He asks Serena to come to America some day, and then kisses her hand. Hubert comes back and the couples leave.

=== Act III ===
==== Scene I: Serena's Sitting-room in Heronden House, Belgrave Square, June, 1874. Afternoon. ====
It is a year later. Hubert announces his intention of going big-game hunting in Africa with a new friend called Mallory. Lady Harriet arrives for afternoon tea. She is in gossipy mood, and says that Charlotte Diensen is back in America awaiting a divorce. She also remarks that Hubert has a new "friend", a Mrs Mallory. Hearing the name, Serena realises the real nature of Hubert's "big-game" expedition. "Poor Hubert!" she exclaims. Harriet is surprised at Serena's mood of elation and excitement. When she has gone, Serena rings for the butler, and gives him a letter to hand to Hubert after she has left the house.

==== Scene 2: The Buffet de la Gare, Boulogne. Early the next morning. ====
The Spevins are on their way back to England. Axel and Serena enter. Spevin recognises them and comes over to their table. He assumes Hubert is travelling with them, and Serena does not correct him. He does not realise that Axel and Serena are eloping. The Stevins leave, and Axel and Serena are left alone. He admits that he is embarrassed by his ignorance of French, and he worries that his lack of education will come to irritate Serena; but she tells him not to worry: "When one elopes with an uncivilised ruffian, one must be prepared for anything". Serena says wistfully that she wishes they were both younger and had more time. Axel replies, "There is time enough, my dear love, time and to spare. Come".

== Awards and nominations ==
=== Original Broadway production ===
Year	Award	Category	Nominee	Result
1955	Tony Award	Best Actor in a Play	Alfred Lunt	Won
1955	Tony Award	Best Costume Design	Cecil Beaton	Won
