= Margot Peters =

American novelist and biographer (1933–2022)

Margot Peters (May 13, 1933 - June 18, 2022) was an American novelist and biographer, including of Charlotte Brontë, George Bernard Shaw, Mrs. Patrick Campbell, the Drews and Barrymores, May Sarton, Alfred Lunt and Lynn Fontanne. She was a recipient of the Ambassador Book Award.

== Early life and education ==
Peters was born in Wausau, Wisconsin, and earned undergraduate and graduate degrees from the University of Wisconsin at Madison.

== Career ==
Peters taught at Northland College in Ashland, Wisconsin and held the Kathe Tappe Vemon Chair in Biography at Dartmouth College. In 1963 she became a faculty member in English literature at the University of Wisconsin, Whitewater, where she rose to full professor. She also taught women's studies, and after retiring in 1991 was professor emerita.

Her first book, Charlotte Bronte: Style in the Novel, was based on her PhD dissertation.

== Awards ==
She won the Friends of American Writers award for best work of prose in 1975 for Unquiet Soul: A Biography of Charlotte Bronte and Banta Awards in 1981 and 1985, for Bernard Shaw and the Actresses and for Mrs. Pat: The Life of Mrs. Patrick Campbell, respectively.

== Selected works ==
=== Biographies ===
- Charlotte Brontë: Style in the Novel. Madison: University of Wisconsin Press, 1973.
- Unquiet Soul: A Biography of Charlotte Brontë New York: Doubleday, 1975. (London: Hodder and Stoughton, 1975. Paris: Editions Stock, 1979. Reprint New York & London, 1986, 1987.)
- Bernard Shaw and the Actresses. New York: Doubleday, 1980.
- Mrs. Pat: The Biography of Mrs. Patrick Campbell. New York: Alfred A. Knopf, 1984; London: The Bodley Head, 1984; Hamish Hamilton, 1985.
- The House of Barrymore. New York: Alfred A. Knopf, 1990.
- May Sarton: A Biography. New York: Alfred A. Knopf, 1997; Ballentine, 1998.
- Design for Living: Alfred Lunt and Lynn Fontanne. New York: Knopf, 2003.
- Lorine Niedecker: A Poet's Life. Madison: University of Wisconsin Press, 2011.

=== Other works ===
- Wild Justice. New York: St. Martin's Press, 1995. Published in paperback as Most Wanted, 1996.
- Summers: A True Love Story. Xlibris, 2011.
