= Point Valaine =

1934 play by Noël Coward

Stefan (Alfred Lunt) and Linda (Lynn Fontanne), 1934

Point Valaine is a play by Noël Coward. It was written as a vehicle for Alfred Lunt and his wife Lynn Fontanne, who starred together in the original Broadway production in 1934. The play was not seen in Britain until 1944 and was not staged in London until 1947.

The play is a story of sexual intrigue, jealousy and suicide in the West Indies. Its striking departure from Coward's familiar high society comedy did not appeal to audiences, and despite the box-office appeal of the Lunts it ran for only 55 performances on Broadway and did no better in Britain with other performers.

== Background and first productions ==
Coward had been a close friend of the husband-and-wife stars, Alfred Lunt and Lynn Fontanne since they met in 1921, and the three had appeared together in Coward's Design for Living, which broke box-office records on Broadway in 1932. Two years later, the Lunts wanted a new play from Coward, but were dismayed at what he wrote for them. He said he was honestly attempting to break new ground "by creating a group of characters and establishing an atmosphere as far removed as possible from anything I have done before". The usual Coward witticisms were eschewed and the dialogue was littered with strong language. Fontanne was certain the public would not like the sordid plot and predicted the play would run no longer than six weeks. Coward dismissed her doubts, but they were justified. The first night audience received the play unenthusiastically. The Lunts were idolised, and the public did not take to seeing them play flawed and sordid characters. Coward's biographer Philip Hoare writes that Point Valaine was the only failure of the Lunts' joint career.

After a try-out in Boston in late December 1934, the play opened at the Ethel Barrymore Theatre in New York on 16 January 1935. Despite a highly favourable review in The New York Times by the influential critic Brooks Atkinson (see below), the play closed after 55 performances.

The first British performances were given by the Old Vic company at the Playhouse, Liverpool, running for 37 performances from 18 October 1944. Mary Ellis played Linda, Frederick Valk Stefan and Julian Dallas Martin.

The first London production was at the Embassy Theatre, opening on 3 September 1947 and running for 37 performances. Mary Ellis was again Linda, with Ben-Astar as Stefan and Allan Cuthbertson as Martin.

== Roles and original casts ==
	Boston and New York 1934–35	London 1947
Mrs Tillett	Grayce Hampton	Marjorie Hellier
Major Tillett	Fred Leslie	Charles Cameron
Mrs Birling	Lilian Tonge	Doris Rogers
Elise Birling	Phyllis Connard	Audrey Fildes
Mortimer Quinn	Osgood Perkins	Anthony Ireland
Stefan	Alfred Lunt	Ben-Astar
Lola	Ruth Boyd	Pauline Henriques
May	Alberta Perkins	Louise Toummavoh
George Fox	Broderick Crawford	Basil Appleby
Ted Burchell	Philip Tonge	Neville Mapp
Linda Valaine	Lynn Fontanne	Mary Ellis
Mrs Hall-Fenton	Gladys Henson	Isobel Olunead
Gladys	Phyllis Harding	Pat Smylie
Phyllls	Margaret Curtis	Prudence Hyman
Sylvia	Valerie Cossart	Alexis Milne
Hilda James	Everley Gregg	Ambrosine Phillpotts
Martin Welford	Louis Hayward	Allan Cuthbertson

== Synopsis ==
The play is set in the Point Valaine hotel on a small island in the British West Indies. The hotel is owned and run by Linda Valaine, an attractive woman aged between thirty-five and forty-five. One of the guests at the hotel is the writer Mortimer Quinn, who coaxes Linda into telling him her life story. She was a missionary's daughter, brought up locally; to escape the oppressive religious environment she married a Frenchman, though not in love with him, and went to live in Lyon. He was killed in the First World War, and she returned to the island, changed its name from Shark Point to Point Valaine, and turned the mission station into a hotel. Quinn asks her about the life story of her interesting and mysterious Russian head waiter, Stefan, but she tries to change the subject. After parting company from Quinn, Linda goes to her room, where she is joined by Stefan, who, it becomes clear, is her lover.

Among new arrivals at the hotel is Martin Welford, a gallant young airman, recuperating from crashing and getting lost in the jungle. He falls in love with Linda, who tells him she is too old for him, but eventually falls into his arms. Stefan discovers the affair and makes his jealousy and his relationship with Linda very plain to Martin, who is appalled. Linda realises that Martin will never speak to her again, and angrily renounces Stefan. She tells him she has never loved him and will never forgive him: "Go away and die!". Unseen by Linda he jumps from the balcony into the sea.

The next morning the disillusioned Martin is comforted by Quinn, who has guessed about the sexual triangle. He tells the young man that when he is older he will be able to look back with detachment and feel sorry for Linda. The assembled guests are interrupted at their breakfasts by the shrieking of the hotel's maid outside. Quinn goes to investigate, and returns to report that Stefan has been found drowned. Linda "in a harsh, cold voice" speaks Stefan's epitaph: "I must see about engaging a new head waiter".

== Critical reception ==
Brooks Atkinson remarked on the "sense of impending horror" Coward conjured up; "Mr Coward knows to drain ugliness and violence out of the tropical atmosphere." He found Stefan's suicide, "the climax of a vague, mounting fever in the detached life of Point Valaine and Mr Coward is ingenious enough to capture the fullness of the evil". Atkinson also praised the stars highly, and suggested that the impact of the play owed much to their performances. Atkinson's fellow critic Percy Hammond enjoyed the piece, but thought it "a little play and a big show" chiefly remarkable for the performances of the Lunts. Burns Mantle in The Chicago Tribune praised Coward for breaking away from his high society manner but regretted his choice of so "ugly and forbidding" a theme, and criticised the Lunts for undertaking their roles. The New York correspondent of The Times thought the play had "a real and violent emotional power: a power quite different from anything Mr Coward has done before", but he added that he was in a minority among reviewers in rating the piece highly.

When the play was staged in London in 1947, Philip Hope-Wallace commented in The Manchester Guardian that it had seemed a mystery why a serious play by so distinguished a writer as Coward had not been staged in London before, but although "on paper there seemed much virtue in this tale", it turned out to be "one of those plays which just fail for lack of essential eloquence .. a continuous misfire, in spite of some sharp sketches". The reviewer in The Times judged that "the simple story has the ring of truth, and its central character is portrayed full length, full depth … many passages are deeply moving."

When the play was revived at the Chichester Festival in 1991, the reviewer in The Guardian thought it "a theatrical bolt from the blue … a rare find". "Never before or after did [Coward] write about sexual politics and of an erotic relationship which vaults the frontiers of class and rank with such power and such conviction".

In Hoare's view, the play is "an unsatisfactory piece which fails to explore the questions it raises". He finds a debt to Somerset Maugham in the characters and milieu, and suggests that the character Mortimer Quinn is an evocation of Maugham, to whom the published text of the play is dedicated.

== Revivals ==
The play was staged at the Chichester Festival in June 1991, with Sara Kestleman as Linda and Jack Klaff as Stefan, and at the Shaw Festival in 1992.

== References and sources ==
=== Sources ===
- Hoare, Philip (1995). Noël Coward, A Biography. London: Sinclair-Stevenson. ISBN 978-1-4081-0675-4.
- Mander, Raymond; Joe Mitchenson (1957). Theatrical Companion to Coward. London: Rockliff. OCLC 470106222.
