= Rodney Sharp =

H. Rodney Sharp III has been a director of DuPont since 1981. Sharp is president of the Board of Trustees of Longwood Foundation, Inc., and a director of Wilmington Trust. He is a trustee and director of Christiana Care Corporation. Sharp also serves as secretary of the board of Planned Parenthood of Delaware.
