= Alfred Lunt =

American actor (1892–1977)

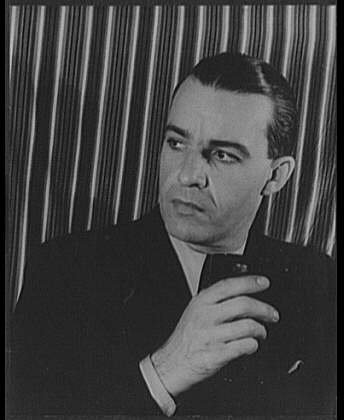
- Photograph by Carl Van Vechten in 1932
- Born: Alfred Davis Lunt Jr. August 12, 1892; Milwaukee, Wisconsin, U.S.
- Died: August 3, 1977 (aged 84); Chicago, Illinois, U.S.
- Resting place: Forest Home Cemetery
- Education: Carroll College; Emerson College
- Occupations: Actor; director
- Years active: 1912–1966
- Spouse: Lynn Fontanne (m. 1922)

Alfred Davis Lunt (August 12, 1892 – August 3, 1977) was an American actor and director, best known for his long stage partnership with his wife, Lynn Fontanne, from the 1920s to 1960, co-starring in Broadway and West End productions. After their marriage, they nearly always appeared together. They became known as "the Lunts" and were celebrated on both sides of the Atlantic.

Although they appeared in classics including The Taming of the Shrew, The Seagull and Pygmalion, and dark comedy by Friedrich Dürrenmatt, The Lunts were best known for their stylish performances in light comedies by Noël Coward, S. N. Behrman, Terence Rattigan and others, and romantic plays by writers such as Robert E. Sherwood. Lunt directed some of the couple's productions, and staged plays for other managements. Though they rarely acted for the camera, The Lunts each received an Emmy Award and were nominated for an Academy Award.

The Lunts retired from the stage in 1960, and lived at their home in Genesee Depot, Wisconsin. Lunt died in 1977 and Fontanne in 1983.

== Life and career ==
=== Early years ===
Alfred Davis Lunt Jr., (Note: Some documents and press cuttings give Lunt's middle name as "Davis"; "David" is given in the American National Biography and the 2003 biography of the Lunts, Design for Living, by Margot Peters) was born in Milwaukee, Wisconsin, on August 12, 1892, the son of Alfred Davis Lunt and his wife Harriet Washburn née Briggs. Alfred senior was a prosperous lumberman and land agent. (Note: With the exception of his paternal grandmother, who was of Scottish descent, Lunt's ancestors were of colonial Maine and Massachusetts stock. His father was a descendant of Henry Lunt, an early settler of Newbury, Massachusetts.) He died in 1894, leaving more than $500,000 to his family. His widow, an eccentric and willful woman, gradually lost all the money, and the family moved to Waukesha, where they ran a boarding house. From an early age, Lunt had a fascination with the theatre. He began acting in high school and at Carroll College in Waukesha. Considering a career as an architect, he transferred to Emerson College, Boston, in 1912. His biographer Jared Brown writes that Lunt "rarely attended classes, having found a job as a minor actor and assistant stage manager with the Castle Square Theatre in Boston". He made his first professional stage appearance there on October 7, 1912, as the Sheriff in The Aviator, and remained as a member of the stock company for two years.

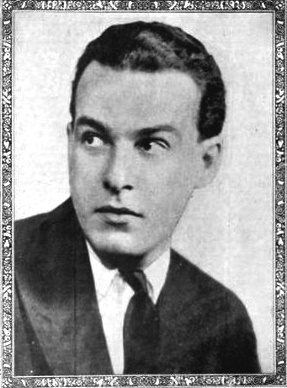
Lunt in an early publicity photograph

In 1914, Lunt toured with Margaret Anglin in Beverley's Balance, remaining with her company for eighteen months, appearing in Green Stockings, As You Like It, Iphigenia in Tauris and Medea. He then toured with, successively, Lillie Langtry, Laura Hope Crews and Anglin again. In 1917, he made his Broadway debut with Crews's company, playing Claude Estabrook in Romance and Arabella. He then appeared in a summer stock season in Washington, D.C., where he met Lynn Fontanne, a rising young English actress. They fell in love, although at first Lunt's wooing was more hesitant than Fontanne would have wished.

In 1919, Lunt had his first important leading part. He played the title role in Booth Tarkington's comedy Clarence (1919), which ran on Broadway for 323 performances. In May 1922, he married Fontanne, and in 1923 they made their first appearance together in a Broadway production, a revival of Paul Kester's 1900 costume drama Sweet Nell of Old Drury.

=== Theatre Guild ===
In 1924, the Lunts joined the company of the Theatre Guild, which, as Brown puts it, "staged plays on Broadway but defied Broadway conventions by offering serious and innovative plays that were regularly rejected by commercial managements". The first play in which the couple appeared for the Guild was Ferenc Molnár's The Guardsman, in which they established a reputation for playing light comedy. They acted together in three plays by Shaw: Arms and the Man (as Bluntschli and Raina, 1925), Pygmalion (as Higgins and Eliza, 1926) and The Doctor's Dilemma (as the Dubedats, 1927). Lunt's other roles in his early years with the Guild included Dmitri Karamazov in The Brothers Karamazov, Marco Polo in Marco Millions and Mosca in Volpone.

The Lunts, mid-1920s

Lunt and Fontanne introduced a naturalistic new way of delivering dialogue, building on a technique Fontanne had begun to explore when acting with Laurette Taylor, earlier in her career. It was unheard of for an actor to speak while another was still speaking, but, in Brown's words:

The Lunts …. perfected the use of overlapping dialogue … although both actors were speaking at the same time, the audience would not miss a word spoken by either. Great skill was required in order to bring off this effect successfully. Lunt spoke in a slightly different rhythm and at a slightly different pitch than Fontanne; each modulated his or her volume level to accommodate the other; and, perhaps most difficult of all, they made the effect sound perfectly natural.

As a consequence, according to Brown, the Lunts' scenes together could be "more vivid, more real than those of other actors". (Note: The English humorous writer Arthur Marshall wrote that the Lunts' technique brought about a revolution in comedy acting: "Never before had such playing been seen. … actors waited to speak until somebody else had finished… The Lunts turned all that upside down. They threw away lines, they trod on each other's words, they gabbled, they whispered, they spoke at the same time. They spoke, in fact, as people do in ordinary life, a theatrical innovation that nobody seems to have tried before".)

In 1928, Lunt and Fontanne co-starred in what for the Guild was an untypically frothy comedy, Caprice. The biographer Margot Peters calls the production a milestone in their careers for two reasons: it was the first production in which they, rather than the play, were the main draw, and it marked the start of their inseparable theatrical partnership: from then on they always appeared together. They took Caprice to London in 1930 – Lunt's first appearance there – and won the admiration of audiences, critics, and writers including Shaw and J. B. Priestley. For the Guild in New York, Lunt and Fontanne starred in Robert Sherwood's romantic comedy Reunion in Vienna, which opened in November 1931 and ran throughout the season, before a nationwide tour. The two were strong believers in touring, taking many of their Broadway hits to remote locations as well as the larger American cities. They felt a double responsibility to do so: to ensure that playwrights had their works presented to as many people as possible, and to allow people outside New York to see Broadway productions.

=== Design for Living ===
Noël Coward, 1925 photograph

Among Lunt and Fontanne's closest friends was Noël Coward. The three had met in New York in 1921, when Coward was a struggling young playwright and actor. They had resolved then that when they were famous, Coward would write a play for all three of them to star in. The Lunts' marriage was the subject of much conjecture in theatrical circles: although they were clearly devoted to each other, there were unsubstantiated but persistent rumors that Lunt was bisexual and had gay liaisons; there was also speculation that Fontanne had extramarital interests. Against this background, Coward wrote a comedy for the three of them, Design for Living (1932), in which Fontanne's character switches back and forth between the two men, who then pair up when she deserts them both, before all three end up together. Coward recorded that while he was refining his original ideas for the play, "Alfred had suggested a few stage directions which, if followed faithfully, would undoubtedly have landed all three of us in gaol". The combination of the risqué subject and the popularity of the three stars caused box-office records to be broken, and reportedly earned the three stars the highest salaries ever paid on Broadway to that time.

The immense success of Design for Living led Coward to write another play for his friends, but his Point Valaine, in which Lunt and Fontanne starred in 1934, was a failure. For Coward, the piece was an uncharacteristically serious drama, and the grim plot and unsympathetic characters did not appeal to audiences used to seeing the Lunts in glamorous and romantic roles; Fontanne's prediction that the play would run for just a few weeks proved correct. It was the only outright failure of the Lunts' joint career.

=== 1934 to 1945 ===
Between the two Coward plays in New York, Lunt and Fontanne played in London, in Reunion in Vienna, repeating their American success with the piece. The Times commented:

The suspense and rhythm of the playing, the variety of the emphasis, preserve a tension very rare in an entertainment as light and, at root, as frivolous as this. Miss Fontanne is all a-glitter; Mr Lunt faultless in direction and speed.

Besides starring in the piece, Lunt directed the London production. He continued to direct throughout his career, staging not only some of the Lunts' productions but those of other companies.

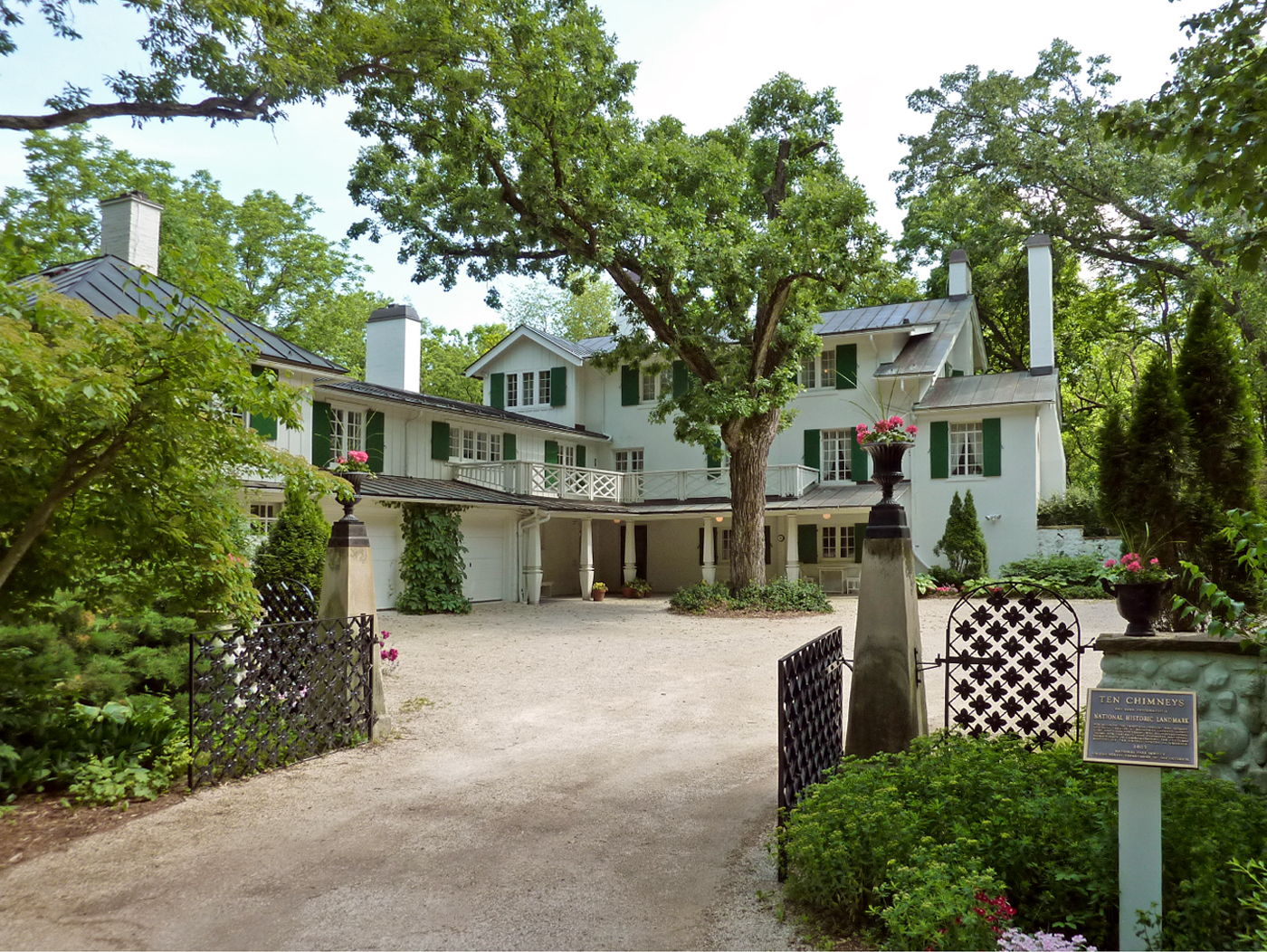
Ten Chimneys, the Lunts' house in Genesee Depot, Wisconsin, now a National Historic Landmark

For the rest of the 1930s, the Lunts appeared in Guild productions in New York and on tour. In 1935 they played Petruchio and Katherina in The Taming of the Shrew; in 1936 they starred in a new Sherwood play, Idiot's Delight; in 1937 they took the leading roles in S. N. Behrman's adaptation of Jean Giraudoux's comedy Amphitryon 38; and in 1938 they played Trigorin and Arkadina in The Seagull on Broadway and took the production of Amphitryon 38 to London before touring it extensively in the US in repertory with Idiot's Delight and The Seagull.

The Lunts had a country estate, known as Ten Chimneys, in Genesee Depot, Wisconsin. It was close to where Lunt had grown up, and he had bought the site with his inheritance when he came of age in 1913. It was their summer home, where they entertained a great many theatrical friends and colleagues over the decades. Carol Channing later said "Genesee Depot is to performers what the Vatican is to Catholics". Since 2003, Ten Chimneys has been a National Historic Landmark. The Lunts gave up their usual summer break there during the latter part of the Second World War, because at Fontanne's behest the couple moved to England. She felt she should share the hardships of her family and friends there, and from 1943 to 1945 the Lunts appeared in the West End, and in performances for the troops, including a tour of army camps in France and Germany in 1945.

=== Later years and death ===
After the war Lunt and Fontanne returned to the US and resumed their association with the Theatre Guild. They appeared in 1946–47 in Terence Rattigan's comedy Love In Idleness (given on Broadway under the title O Mistress Mine), and in 1949–50 in I Know My Love, Berhman's adaptation of Auprès de ma blonde by Marcel Achard; these productions ran for 482 and 247 performances respectively. The Lunts toured the latter throughout the US.

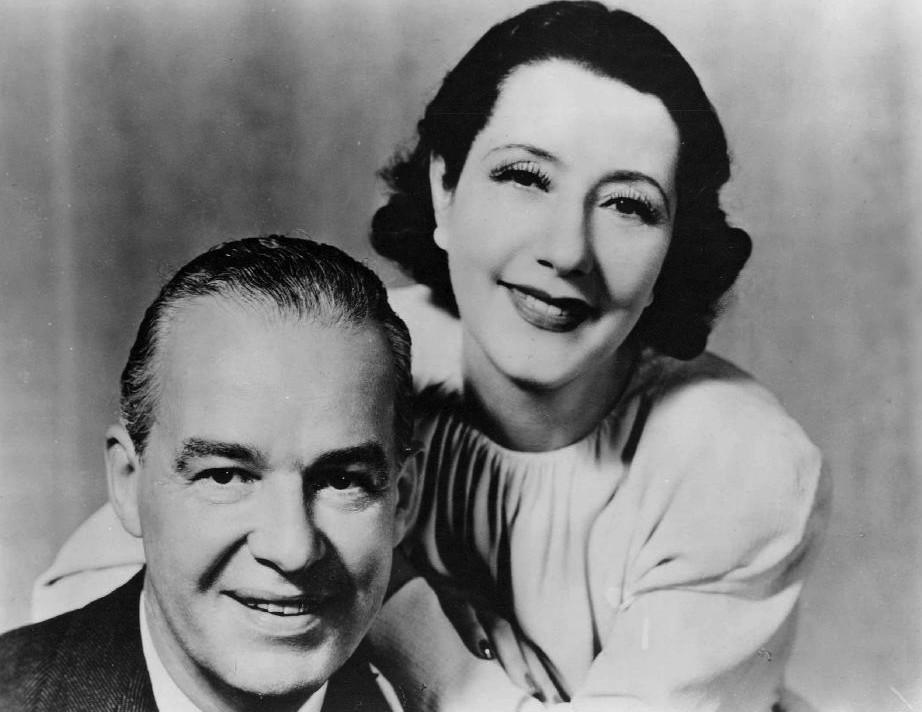
Lunt and Fontanne in 1950

Lunt continued to direct. Among his productions was Così fan Tutte, sung in English, at the Metropolitan Opera in December 1951, critically praised and much revived subsequently. In the first performances of the production, Lunt made a rare stage appearance without Fontanne, in the silent role of a footman, opening the opera by lighting candles and exiting before the action began.

Lunt and Fontanne returned to England in 1952 for their third and final Coward premiere, Quadrille, a romantic comedy set in the 1870s. After a West End run of 329 performances they took the play to Broadway in 1954, where Lunt directed as well as starred. The piece ran for 159 performances; it could have profitably run for longer, but the Lunts chose to close in March 1955. Their last Broadway premiere was in Howard Lindsay and Russel Crouse's "melodramatic comedy" The Great Sebastians in 1956. After a six-month run in New York they toured the piece throughout the US. Their final production was in 1957: The Visit, Maurice Valency's adaptation of Friedrich Dürrenmatt's Der Besuch der alten Dame, in which a rich old woman exacts a terrible revenge on the man who betrayed her fifty years earlier. They toured the play in Britain in 1957–58, initially under the title Time and Again, in a production directed by Peter Brook. In May 1958 they opened the Lunt-Fontanne Theatre in New York with the same play (by then renamed The Visit) and toured it in the US. In June 1960, in Brook's production, they opened the new Royalty Theatre, London, running until 19 October. A final week playing the piece at the Golders Green Hippodrome in November was the Lunts' last stage appearance.

After retiring from acting, Lunt continued to direct. At the Morosco Theatre in 1961, he directed Samuel A. Taylor's First Love, and for the Metropolitan Opera he directed La Traviata in 1966, starring Anna Moffo as Violetta, with designs by Cecil Beaton.

Lunt died of cancer in a hospital in Chicago on August 3, 1977, aged 84. On the day after the news was released, every Broadway theatre dimmed its lights for one minute at 7.59 p.m., except for the Lunt-Fontanne, which remained brilliantly lit. Fontanne outlived Lunt by six years, dying at Ten Chimneys in 1983. The two are buried together at Forest Home Cemetery in Milwaukee.

== Cinema and broadcasting ==
The Lunts disliked acting for the camera and made only three films together. One was The Guardsman (1931), for which they were both nominated for Academy Awards. They appeared in Stage Door Canteen (1943) in which they had cameos as themselves. The two starred in four television productions in the 1950s and 1960s, with both Lunt and Fontanne winning Emmy Awards in 1965 for The Magnificent Yankee.

== Honors ==
In September 1964, Lunt and Fontanne were presented with the Presidential Medal of Freedom by President Lyndon Johnson at a White House ceremony. (Note: Fellow honorands at the ceremony included T. S. Eliot, Walt Disney, John Steinbeck and Helen Keller.) Both the Lunts were members of the American Theater Hall of Fame. In 1947, Lunt was awarded the American Academy of Arts and Letters Medal for Good Speech on the Stage. He received honorary degrees from Carroll College, Dartmouth College, Beloit College, Emerson College, New York University, Yale University, and the University of Wisconsin.

== Notes, references and sources ==
=== Sources ===
- Coward, Noël (1979). Plays: Three. London: Methuen. ISBN 978-0-413-46100-1.
- Day, Barry, ed. (2007). The Letters of Noël Coward. London: Methuen. ISBN 978-0-7136-8578-7.
- Herbert, Ian, ed. (1977). Who's Who in the Theatre (sixteenth ed.). London and Detroit: Pitman Publishing and Gale Research. ISBN 978-0-273-00163-8.
- Hoare, Philip (1995). Noël Coward, A Biography. Lonson: Sinclair-Stevenson. ISBN 978-1-85619-265-1.
- Lahr, John (1982). Coward the Playwright. London: Methuen. ISBN 978-0-413-48050-7.
- Marshall, Arthur (1984). Life's Rich Pageant. London: Hamish Hamilton. ISBN 978-0-241-11306-6.
- Peters, Margot (2003). Design for Living: Alfred Lunt and Lynn Fontanne – A Biography. New York: Knopf. ISBN 978-0-307-42551-5.
