= The Guardsman =

1931 film

- Directed by: Sidney Franklin; Harold S. Bucquet (ass't director)
- Written by: Maxwell Anderson; Ernest Vajda (screenplay); Claudine West (continuity)
- Based on: Testör; 1911 play by Ferenc Molnár
- Produced by: Albert Lewin (*uncredited); Irving Thalberg (*uncredited)
- Starring: Alfred Lunt; Lynn Fontanne
- Cinematography: Norbert Brodine
- Edited by: Conrad Nervig
- Distributed by: Metro-Goldwyn-Mayer
- Release date: November 7, 1931
- Running time: 89 minutes (10 reels)
- Country: United States
- Language: English
- Budget: $374,000

The Guardsman is a 1931 American pre-Code film based on the play Testőr by Ferenc Molnár. It stars Alfred Lunt, Lynn Fontanne, Roland Young and ZaSu Pitts. It opens with a stage re-enactment of the final scene of Maxwell Anderson's Elizabeth the Queen, with Fontanne as Elizabeth and Lunt as the Earl of Essex, but otherwise has nothing to do with that play.

The film was adapted by Ernest Vajda (screenplay) and Claudine West (continuity) and was directed by Sidney Franklin. Lunt and Fontanne were husband and wife and a celebrated stage acting team. This film was based upon the roles they had played on Broadway in 1924 and it was their only starring film role together. They were nominated for Best Actor in a Leading Role and Best Actress in a Leading Role, respectively. Nonetheless, the film was not a popular success at the box office, and the two stars returned to working on Broadway.

== Plot ==
The story revolves around a husband-and-wife acting team. Simply because he is insecure, the husband suspects his wife could be capable of infidelity. The husband disguises himself as a guardsman with a thick accent, woos his wife under his false identity, and ends up seducing her. The couple stays together, and at the end the wife convinces her husband that she knew it was him, but played along with the deception.

== Cast ==
- Alfred Lunt as The Actor
- Lynn Fontanne as The Actress
- Roland Young as Bernhardt the Critic
- ZaSu Pitts as Liesl, the Maid
- Maude Eburne as Mama
- Herman Bing as A Creditor

== Remakes ==
- In 1941, the plot and much of the script was used for the film version of Oscar Straus's operetta The Chocolate Soldier, starring Risë Stevens and Nelson Eddy. The stage production had used the plot of George Bernard Shaw's Arms and the Man, but Shaw had been deeply offended and angered at the result. For the film, MGM decided instead to use the plot of Molnar's The Guardsman, but it kept the stage score of The Chocolate Soldier. The film was a great success.
- On March 2, 1955, a 60-minute version of the play was aired on the series The Best of Broadway.
- In 1984, a new non-musical version, titled Lily in Love, starring Christopher Plummer and Maggie Smith, was made, but the play was so altered that the names of the characters were changed and Molnar was not even given screen credit. The film was a total flop.

== Bibliography ==
- Balio Tino. Grand Design: Hollywood as a Modern Business Entertprise 1930-1939. University of California Press, 1995.
