= Lynn Fontanne =

English actress (1887–1983)

- Fontanne in 1920
- Born: Lillie Louise Fontanne; 6 December 1887 (Note: It was quite usual for actresses (and some actors) to deduct a few years from their age in reference books such as Who's Who in the Theatre, which Fontanne did, claiming to have been born in 1892. She carried the pretence to the extent of concealing her real age from her husband, and not admitting it publicly until after his death.); Woodford, Essex
- Died: 30 July 1983 (aged 95); Genesee Depot, Wisconsin, U.S.
- Resting place: Forest Home Cemetery
- Occupation: Actress
- Years active: 1905–1967
- Spouse: Alfred Lunt (m. 1922; died 1977)

Lynn Fontanne (/fɒnˈtæn/; 6 December 1887 – 30 July 1983) was an English actress. After early success in supporting roles in the West End and United States, she married the American actor Alfred Lunt in 1922, with whom she co-starred in Broadway and West End productions over the next four decades. They became known as "The Lunts", and were celebrated on both sides of the Atlantic.

Fontanne was born in what is now the London suburb of Woodford, and received her first training as an actress from Ellen Terry. After building up an acting career in Britain she worked extensively in the US, first appearing in New York in 1910. Although she appeared in classics including The Taming of the Shrew and The Seagull, experimental drama by Eugene O'Neill, and dark comedy by Friedrich Dürrenmatt, Fontanne and her husband were best known for their stylish performances in light comedies by Noël Coward, S. N. Behrman, Terence Rattigan and others, and romantic plays by writers such as Robert E. Sherwood.

The Lunts retired from the stage in 1960, and lived at their home in Genesee Depot, Wisconsin, where, after outliving her husband by six years, Fontanne died at the age of 95.

== Life and career ==
=== Early years ===
Fontanne was born Lillie Louise Fontanne in Woodford, Essex (now London), on 6 December 1887. She was the youngest of the three daughters of Jules Pierre Antoine Fontanne (1855–1942) and his wife Frances Ellen, née Thornley (1858–1921). She was educated in London, after which a family friend introduced her to the leading actress Ellen Terry, who sometimes gave lessons to promising young players. Partly as a result of Terry’s training and influence, Fontanne was given roles in plays in London and on tour throughout England from 1905 to 1916. She made her first appearance at the Theatre Royal, Drury Lane, at Christmas 1905, in the chorus of the pantomime, Cinderella, and subsequently "walked on" (i.e. was a non-speaking extra) in productions in London starring Lewis Waller, Sir Herbert Tree, Lena Ashwell and others.

As Liza in My Lady's Dress, 1914

During 1909, she toured as Rose in Lady Frederick with Mabel Love. At the Garrick Theatre, London, in December 1909 she appeared in Where Children Rule, and in Billy's Bargain at the same theatre in June 1910 she played Lady Mulberry. She then made her first visit to America, making her début in New York at Nazimova's 39th Street Theatre in November 1910 as Harriet Budgeon in Mr Preedy and the Countess with Weedon Grossmith.

After returning to London in 1911 she played at the Criterion Theatre in The Young Lady of Seventeen and at the Vaudeville in A Storm in a Tea Shop. She then toured in the provinces in 1912–13 as Gertrude Rhead in Arnold Bennett and Edward Knoblock's Milestones, before playing the part in London. In that role she had to play the same character in youth, middle age and old age. The American star Laurette Taylor saw her in the role and was impressed. At the Royalty Theatre in April 1914 Fontanne scored a success as Liza and Mrs Collison in Knoblock's My Lady's Dress. She played in four other London productions in 1914–15, including the premiere of The Starlight Express. She became engaged to marry a young lawyer, Teddy Byrne, but he was killed in action in 1916 during the First World War.

=== Broadway ===
As Lady Castlemaine in Sweet Nell of Old Drury, 1923

Shortly before Byrne's death, Fontanne accepted an offer to join Laurette Taylor's company in New York. Taylor and her husband, Hartley Manners, fostered the young Fontanne's career. Taylor later said, "While acting with her I forgot we were actresses". After five plays with them, Fontanne graduated to leading roles for other managements. Between 1918 and 1920, she succeeded Laura Hope Crews as Mrs Rockingham in "A Pair of Petticoats" in New York, and was the female lead in new plays on Broadway and in Chicago and Philadelphia. During this time, playing in summer stock in Washington DC, she met the actor Alfred Lunt. They fell in love, although at first Lunt's wooing was more hesitant than Fontanne would have wished.

In mid-1920 Fontanne appeared once again in the West End, appearing with Taylor in a play by Manners, One Night in Rome. She had little chance to shine in what The Stage called "a one-part play" written as a vehicle for Taylor. Wanting to be reunited with Lunt, Fontanne quickly returned to the US, where in 1921 she had her first big success, in the lead role of George S. Kaufman and Marc Connelly's comedy Dulcy. (Note: Dorothy Parker wrote a verse celebrating Fontanne in the play: Dulcy, take our gratitude All your words are gold ones. Mistress of the platitude, Queen of all the old ones. You, at last, are something new 'Neath the theatre's dome. I'd Mention to the cosmos, you Swing a wicked bromide. ...) She did not return to the West End for nine years.

In May 1922 Fontanne married Lunt, and in 1923 they made their first appearance together in a Broadway production, a revival of Paul Kester's 1900 costume drama Sweet Nell of Old Drury. Although Taylor was the female lead, it was Fontanne who impressed the critics. In The New York Herald, Alexander Woollcott dismissed the play as "gaudy rubbish", but added:

one performance stood out last evening as something of fine mettle, something true and shining. That was the performance of Lynn Fontanne as the frustrated and embittered Lady Castlemaine. ... It might be noted in passing that she is growing beautiful.

=== Theatre Guild ===
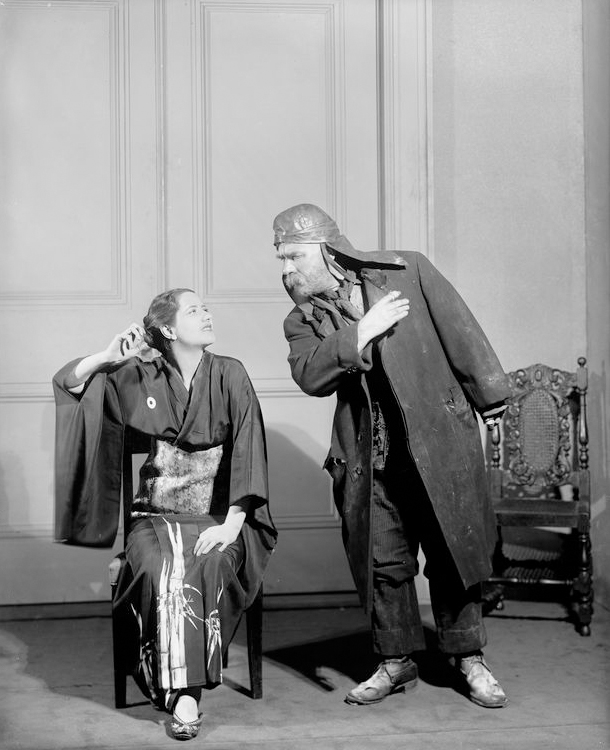
As Eliza in Pygmalion, 1926, with Henry Travers as Doolittle

In 1924, the Lunts joined the company of the Theatre Guild, which, in the words of Fontanne's biographer Jared Brown, "staged plays on Broadway but defied Broadway conventions by offering serious and innovative plays that were regularly rejected by commercial managements". The first play in which the couple appeared for the Guild was Ferenc Molnár's The Guardsman, in which they established a reputation for playing light comedy. They acted together in three plays by Bernard Shaw: Arms and the Man (as Raina and Bluntschli, 1925), Pygmalion (as Eliza and Higgins, 1926) and The Doctor's Dilemma (as the Dubedats, 1927). Fontanne had the chance to demonstrate her versatility by switching from comedy to demanding experimental drama in Eugene O'Neill's Strange Interlude (1928), described by Woollcott as "the Abie's Irish Rose of the pseudo-intelligentsia".

Fontanne and Lunt introduced a naturalistic new way of delivering dialogue, building on a technique Fontanne had begun to explore in her performances with Laurette Taylor. It was unheard of for an actor to speak while another was still speaking, but, in Brown's words:

The Lunts … perfected the use of overlapping dialogue … although both actors were speaking at the same time, the audience would not miss a word spoken by either. Great skill was required in order to bring off this effect successfully. Lunt spoke in a slightly different rhythm and at a slightly different pitch than Fontanne; each modulated his or her volume level to accommodate the other; and, perhaps most difficult of all, they made the effect sound perfectly natural.

As a consequence, according to Brown, the Lunts' scenes together could be "more vivid, more real than those of other actors". (Note: The English humorous writer Arthur Marshall wrote that the Lunts' technique brought about a revolution in comedy acting: "Never before had such playing been seen. … actors waited to speak until somebody else had finished… The Lunts turned all that upside down. They threw away lines, they trod on each other's words, they gabbled, they whispered, they spoke at the same time. They spoke, in fact, as people do in ordinary life, a theatrical innovation that nobody seems to have tried before".)

The Lunts, mid-1920s

In 1928, Fontanne and Lunt co-starred in what for the Guild was an untypically frothy comedy, Caprice. The biographer Margot Peters calls the production a milestone in their careers for two reasons: it was the first production in which they, rather than the play, were the main draw, and it marked the start of their inseparable theatrical partnership: from then on they always appeared together. They took Caprice to London in 1930 – Lunt's first appearance there – and won the admiration of audiences, critics, and writers including Shaw and J. B. Priestley. For the Guild in New York, Fontanne and Lunt starred in Robert Sherwood's romantic comedy Reunion in Vienna which opened in November 1931 and ran throughout the season, before a nationwide tour. The two were strong believers in touring, taking many of their Broadway hits to remote locations as well as the larger American cities. They felt a double responsibility to do so: to ensure that playwrights had their works presented to as many people as possible, and to allow people outside New York to see Broadway productions.

=== Design for Living ===
Noël Coward, 1925 photograph

Fontanne and Lunt had been close friends of the English actor and playwright Noël Coward since they met in New York in 1921, before any of them had achieved success in the theatre. They had resolved then that when they were famous, Coward would write a play for all three of them to star in. The Lunts' marriage was the subject of much conjecture in theatrical circles: although they were clearly devoted to each other, there were unsubstantiated but persistent rumours that Lunt was bisexual and had gay liaisons; there was also speculation that Fontanne had extramarital interests. Against this background, Coward wrote a comedy for the three of them, Design for Living (1932), in which Fontanne's character switches back and forth between the two men, who then pair up when she deserts them both, before all three end up together. (Note: Coward recorded that while he was refining his original ideas for the play, "Alfred had suggested a few stage directions which if followed faithfully, would undoubtedly have landed all three of us in gaol".) The combination of the risqué subject and the popularity of the three stars caused box-office records to be broken, and reportedly earned Fontanne and her co-stars the highest salaries paid on Broadway to that time.

The immense success of Design for Living led Coward to write another play for his friends, but his Point Valaine, in which Fontanne and Lunt starred in 1934, was a failure. Coward set out to write an uncharacteristically serious drama, but the grim plot and unsympathetic characters did not appeal to audiences used to seeing the Lunts in glamorous and romantic roles; Fontanne's prediction that the play would only run for a matter of weeks proved correct. It was the only outright failure of the Lunts' joint career.

=== 1934 to 1945 ===
Between the two Coward plays in New York, Fontanne and Lunt played in London, in Reunion in Vienna, repeating their American success with the piece. The Times commented:

The suspense and rhythm of the playing, the variety of the emphasis, preserve a tension very rare in an entertainment as light and, at root, as frivolous as this. Miss Fontanne is all a-glitter; Mr Lunt faultless in direction and speed.

For the rest of the 1930s Fontanne and her husband appeared in Guild productions. In 1935 they played Katherina and Petruchio in The Taming of the Shrew; in 1936 they starred in a new Sherwood play, Idiot's Delight; in 1937 they took the leading roles in S. N. Behrman's adaptation of Jean Giraudoux's comedy Amphitryon 38; and in 1938 they played Arkadina and Trigorin in The Seagull on Broadway and took the production of Amphitryon 38 to London, before touring it extensively in the US in repertory with Idiot's Delight and The Seagull.

The Lunts had a country estate in Genesee Depot, Wisconsin, close to where Lunt had grown up. It was their summer home, where they entertained a great many theatrical friends and colleagues over the decades. Carol Channing later said "Genesee Depot is to performers what the Vatican is to Catholics". They gave up their usual summer break there during the latter part of the Second World War, because at Fontanne's behest the couple moved to England. She felt she should share the hardships of her family and friends there, and from 1943 to 1945 the Lunts appeared in the West End, and in performances for the troops, including a tour of army camps in France and Germany in 1945.

=== Later years ===
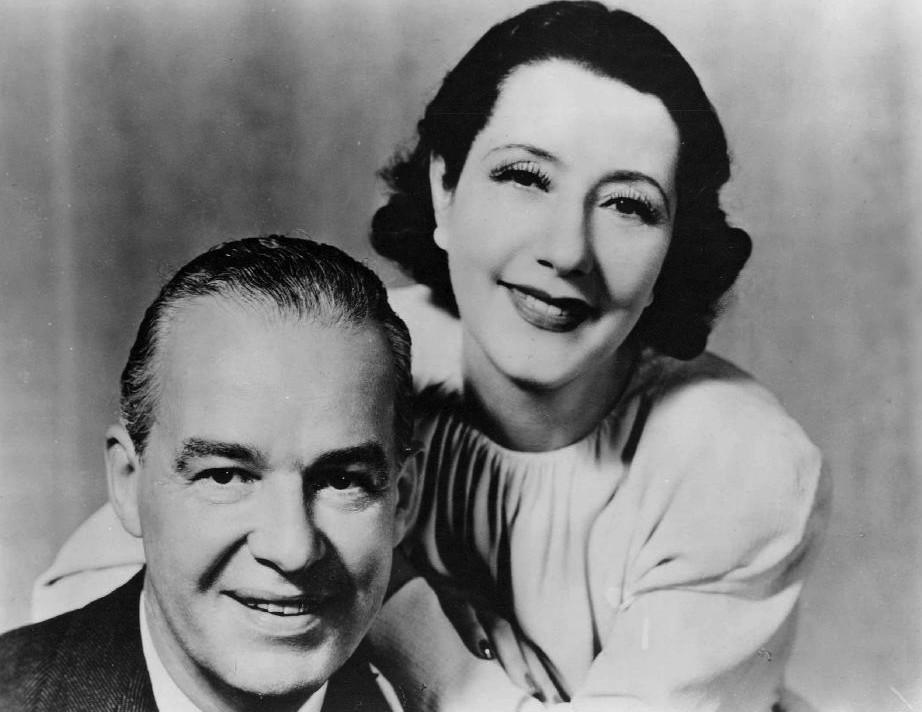
Lunt and Fontanne in 1950

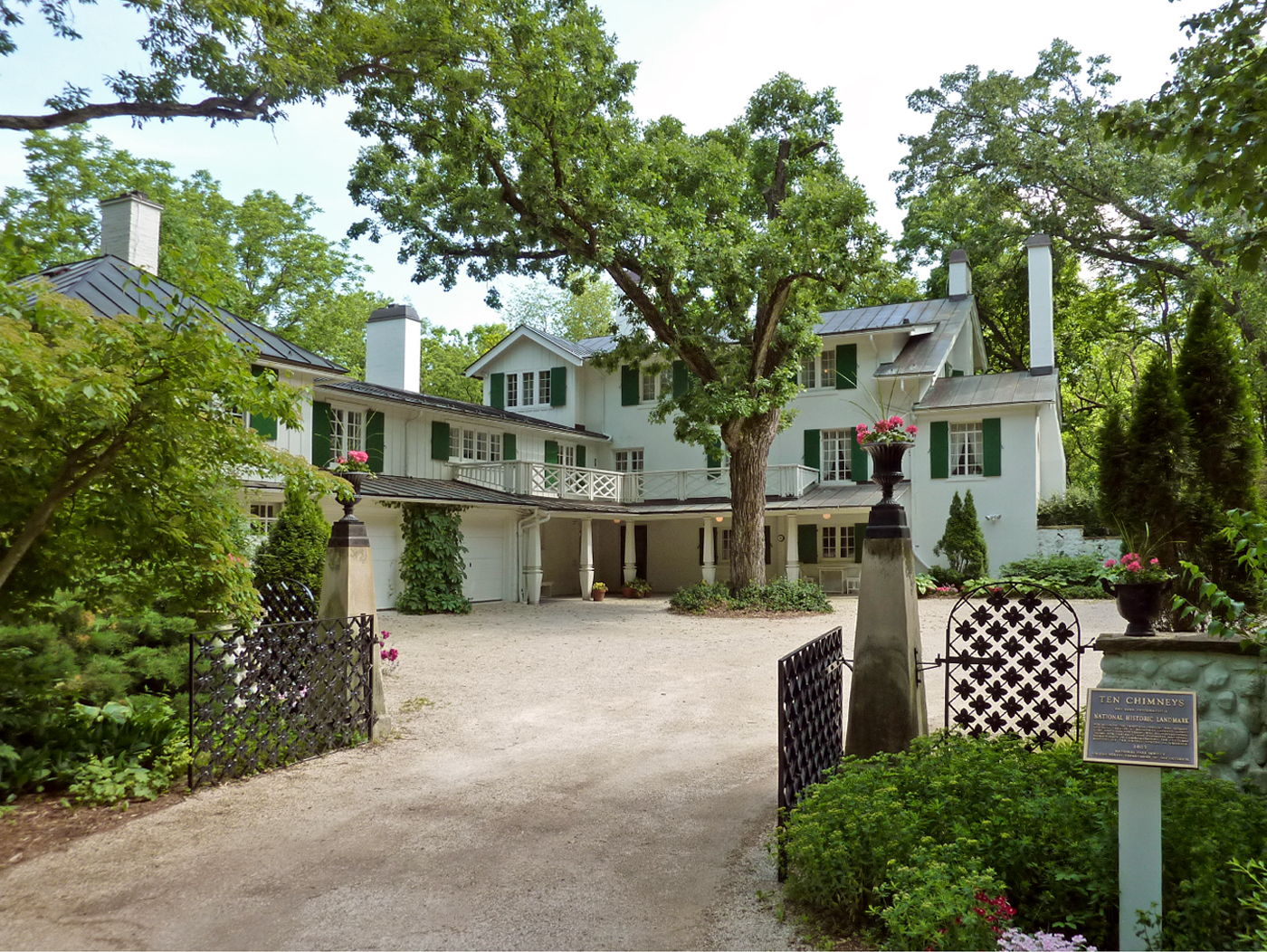
"Ten Chimneys", the Lunts' house in Genesee Depot, Wisconsin

After the war Fontanne and Lunt returned to the US and resumed their association with the Theatre Guild. They appeared in 1946–47 in Terence Rattigan's comedy Love In Idleness (given on Broadway under the title O Mistress Mine), and in 1949–50 in I Know My Love, Berhman's adaptation of Auprès de ma blonde by Marcel Achard; these productions ran for 482 and 247 performances respectively. The Lunts toured the latter throughout the US. They returned to England in 1952 for their third and final Coward premiere, Quadrille, a romantic comedy set in the 1870s. After a West End run of 329 performances they took the play to Broadway in 1954, where it ran for 159 performances; it could have profitably run for longer, but the Lunts chose to close in March 1955.

Fontanne and Lunt's last Broadway premiere was in Howard Lindsay and Russel Crouse's "melodramatic comedy" The Great Sebastians in 1956. After a six-month run in New York they toured the piece throughout the US. Their final production was in 1957: The Visit, Maurice Valency's adaptation of Friedrich Dürrenmatt's Der Besuch der alten Dame, in which a rich old woman exacts a terrible revenge on the man who betrayed her fifty years earlier. They toured the play in Britain in 1957–58, initially under the title Time and Again, in a production directed by Peter Brook. In May 1958 they opened the Lunt-Fontanne Theatre in New York with the same play (by then renamed The Visit) and toured it in the US. In June 1960, in Brook's production, they opened the new Royalty Theatre, London, running until 19 October. After a final week playing the piece at the Golders Green Hippodrome in November they retired from the stage.

Lunt died on 3 August 1977. Fontanne died in Genesee Depot on 30 July 1983, aged 95, from pneumonia, and was interred next to her husband at Forest Home Cemetery in Milwaukee, Wisconsin.

== Cinema and broadcasting ==
Fontanne, like her husband, disliked acting for the camera and she made only four films. She appeared in the silent films Second Youth (1924) and The Man Who Found Himself (1925). For The Guardsman (1931) she and Lunt were both nominated for Academy Awards. She and Lunt were in Stage Door Canteen (1943) in which they had cameos as themselves. The two starred in four television productions in the 1950s and 1960s with both Lunt and Fontanne winning Emmy Awards in 1965 for The Magnificent Yankee. She narrated a 1960 television production of Peter Pan starring Mary Martin and received a second Emmy nomination for playing Grand Duchess Marie in the Hallmark Hall of Fame telecast of Anastasia in 1967, two of the few productions in which she appeared without her husband. The Lunts also starred in several radio dramas in the 1940s, notably on the Theatre Guild programme. Many of these broadcasts still survive.

== Honours ==
In September 1964 Lunt and Fontanne were presented with the Presidential Medal of Freedom by President Lyndon Johnson at a White House ceremony. (Note: Fellow honorands at the ceremony included T. S. Eliot, Walt Disney, John Steinbeck and Helen Keller.) Like Lunt, Fontanne was a member of the American Theater Hall of Fame. She received a Kennedy Center Honor for the Performing Arts in 1980. (Note: Also honoured at that ceremony were Leonard Bernstein, Agnes de Mille, Leontyne Price and James Cagney.) She received no official British honour, which was a matter of mild regret as she would have liked to be Dame Lynn Fontanne: "They thought I was American. But I was always British. I would have cherished the award". When she was 90 she received a standing ovation when she attended a performance of Hello, Dolly! at the Lunt-Fontanne Theatre.

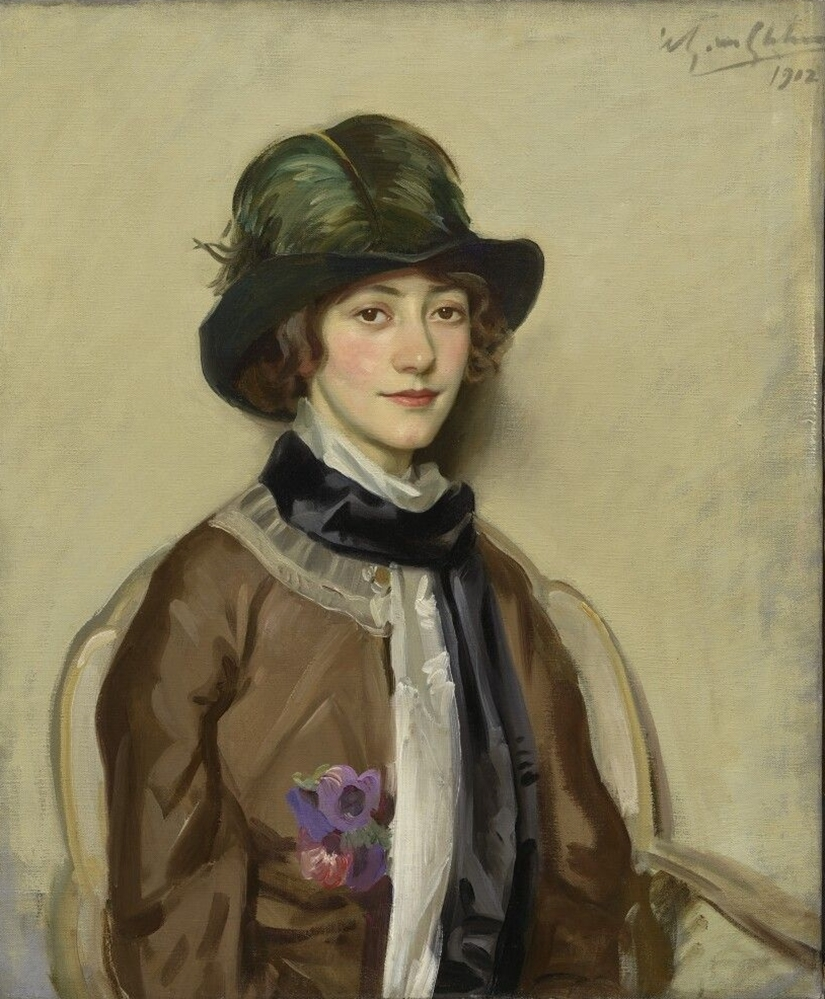
Oil on canvas portrait of Lynn Fontanne by Wilfrid de Glehn (1912). Housed at the National Portrait Gallery (United States)

== Notes, references and sources ==
=== Sources ===
- Burns, Morris U. (1980). The Dramatic Criticism of Alexander Woollcott. Metuchen: Scarecrow. OCLC 567976031.
- Coward, Noël (1979). Plays: Three. London: Methuen. ISBN 978-0-413-46100-1.
- Day, Barry, ed. (2007). The Letters of Noël Coward. London: Methuen. ISBN 978-0-7136-8578-7.
- Herbert, Ian, ed. (1977). Who's Who in the Theatre (sixteenth ed.). London and Detroit: Pitman Publishing and Gale Research. ISBN 978-0-273-00163-8.
- Hoare, Philip (1995). Noël Coward, A Biography. Lonson: Sinclair-Stevenson. ISBN 978-1-85619-265-1.
- Lahr, John (1982). Coward the Playwright. London: Methuen. ISBN 978-0-413-48050-7.
- Marshall, Arthur (1984). Life's Rich Pageant. London: Hamish Hamilton. ISBN 978-0-241-11306-6.
- Parker, John, ed. (1925). Who's Who in the Theatre (fifth ed.). London: Sir Isaac Pitman and Sons. OCLC 10013159.
- Peters, Margot (2003). Design for Living: Alfred Lunt and Lynn Fontanne – A Biography. New York: Knopf. ISBN 978-0-307-42551-5.
- Silverstein, Stuart (1996). Not Much Fun: The Lost Poems of Dorothy Parker. New York: Scribner. ISBN 978-0-7432-1148-2.
- Ware, Susan; Stacy Lorraine Braukman (2005). Notable American Women: A Biographical Dictionary. Cambridge, Mass and London: Belknap. ISBN 978-0-674-01488-6.
