= White Cliffs, St Margaret's Bay =

Home of Noël Coward in Kent, England

White Cliffs
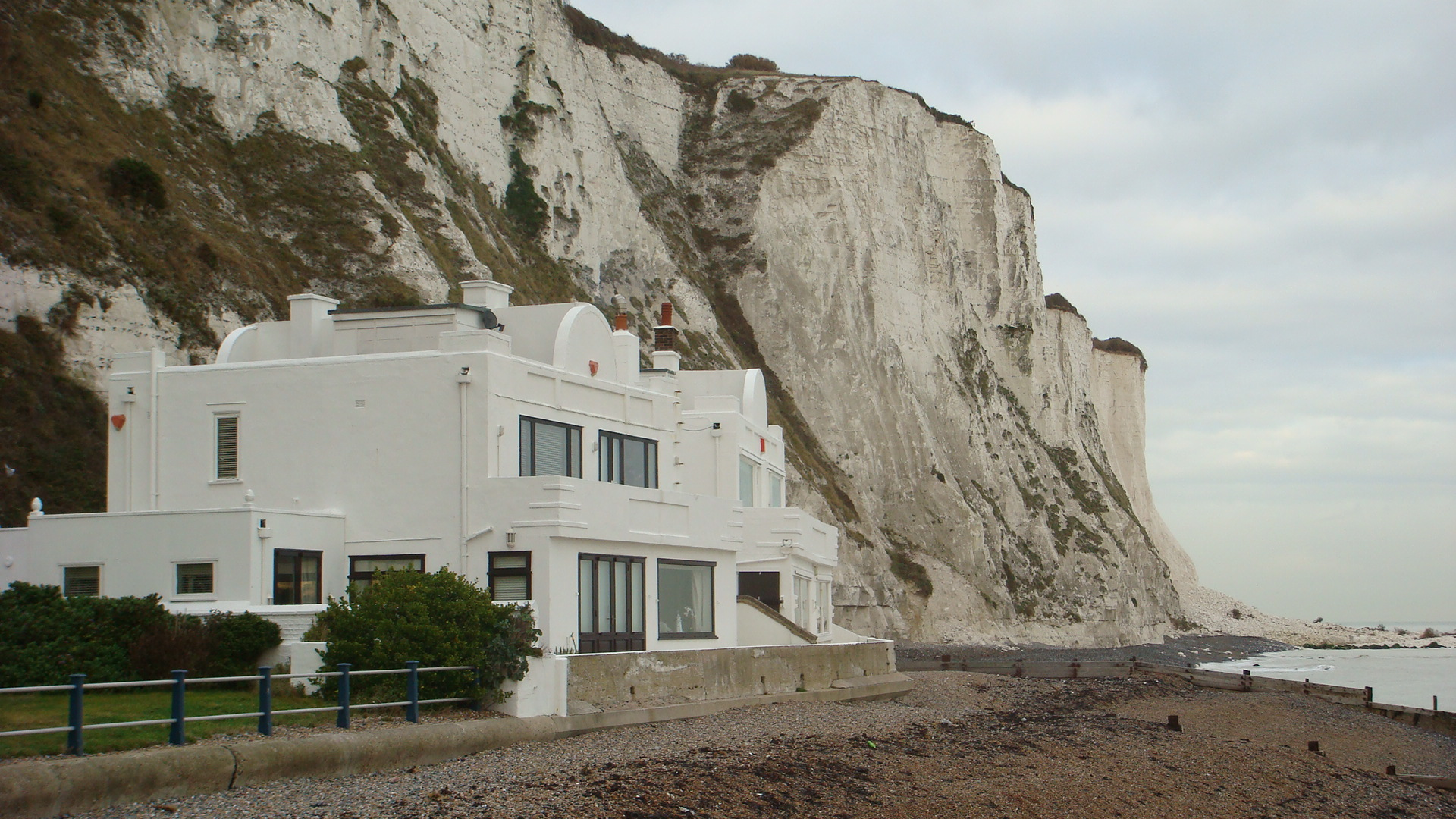
- White Cliffs in 2007

- Location within Kent

General information
- Architectural style: Streamline Moderne
- Coordinates: 51°09′09″N 1°23′18″E
- Owner: Noël Coward (1946-51) / Ian Fleming (1951-57)

White Cliffs is a complex of beach cottages at St Margaret's Bay, in the county of Kent, England. The property was the home of Noël Coward from 1946 until 1951. Coward's lease was taken up by the author Ian Fleming, who lived there until 1957. The complex has subsequently been sub-divided into four properties, all of which remain privately owned.

== History ==
Sir Noël Peirce Coward (16 December 1899 – 26 March 1973) was an English playwright. Achieving great success in the decades between the First and the Second World Wars, in 1926 he bought a country house in Kent, Goldenhurst Farm, in Aldington, making it his home for most of the next thirty years. During the war, Goldenhurst was requisitioned by the army and, after the war, required significant renovation and repair. As an interim measure Coward took a lease on a complex of cottages at St Margaret's Bay on the Kent coast, remaining there until 1951. By this time changing tastes led to a falling off in the popularity of Coward's work, while the post-war tax regime made the expense of running a large country house increasingly burdensome. In response, in 1956, Coward sold Goldenhurst and his London home, becoming a tax exile, a step which, while saving him money, brought him considerable public opprobrium. He made his winter home in the Caribbean, firstly in Bermuda, and then at Firefly, an estate in Jamaica; while his summers were spent in Switzerland, at Chalet Covar in Les Avants.

The development of White Cliffs had been undertaken in 1937 by the Elms Vale Estate Company as six separate dwellings, originally named "Bay Cottages". Coward wished to rent all of the cottages in the complex, but post-war restrictions limited him to one property, requiring that the leases on the other buildings were contracted in the names of his friend, Eric Ambler, his assistant Cole Lesley, and his mother and his aunt. (Note: Many sources suggest that he bought the White Cliffs complex outright, but Coward's own diary is clear; "I am going to Goldenhurst tomorrow to have a look-see - my lease here [White Cliffs] expires in eight years".) Coward engaged an architect, identified in his diaries only as "Williamson", to undertake repairs to the cottage complex. The cottages were used for his own relaxation and for the entertainment of his friends. Visitors included Spencer Tracy, Katharine Hepburn, John Mills and Daphne du Maurier. The revival of tourism in the post-war period saw St Margaret's Bay become "a beach crowded with noisy hoi polloi" and Coward sold the remaining lease to his friend Ian Fleming, returning to a renovated Goldenhurst in 1951. (Note: A further concern for Coward was the coastal erosion affecting the cliffs above the house. This saw rock from the cliff face regularly fall into the garden.)

Fleming drew on the house's location as the setting for his 1955 novel Moonraker in which the villain, Hugo Drax constructs a nuclear missile on the Kent coast. After Fleming's lease expired in 1957, the houses continued as private dwellings which, as at 2025, they remain.

== Architecture and description ==
The complex comprises four, originally six, cottages in a row directly facing the beach and below the cliffs of St Margaret's Bay. The conservation area appraisal prepared by Dover District Council and St Margaret's Bay Conservation Association describes the architectural style of the façade as Art Deco with a Dutch "aesthetic" to the final house. The buildings are rendered in white and the last cottage has a pantile roof, while the remainder are flat. The complex is unlisted but is briefly covered by John Newman in his Kent Pevsner; "a white, flat-roofed group of the mid-to late 1930s with Art Deco details, sensationally sited between the seashore and the looming white cliff". Evelyn Waugh, a visitor in 1955, was less impressed with the interior accommodation; "'White Cliffs' is gruesomely small and ill furnished but the party was gay".

== Gallery ==
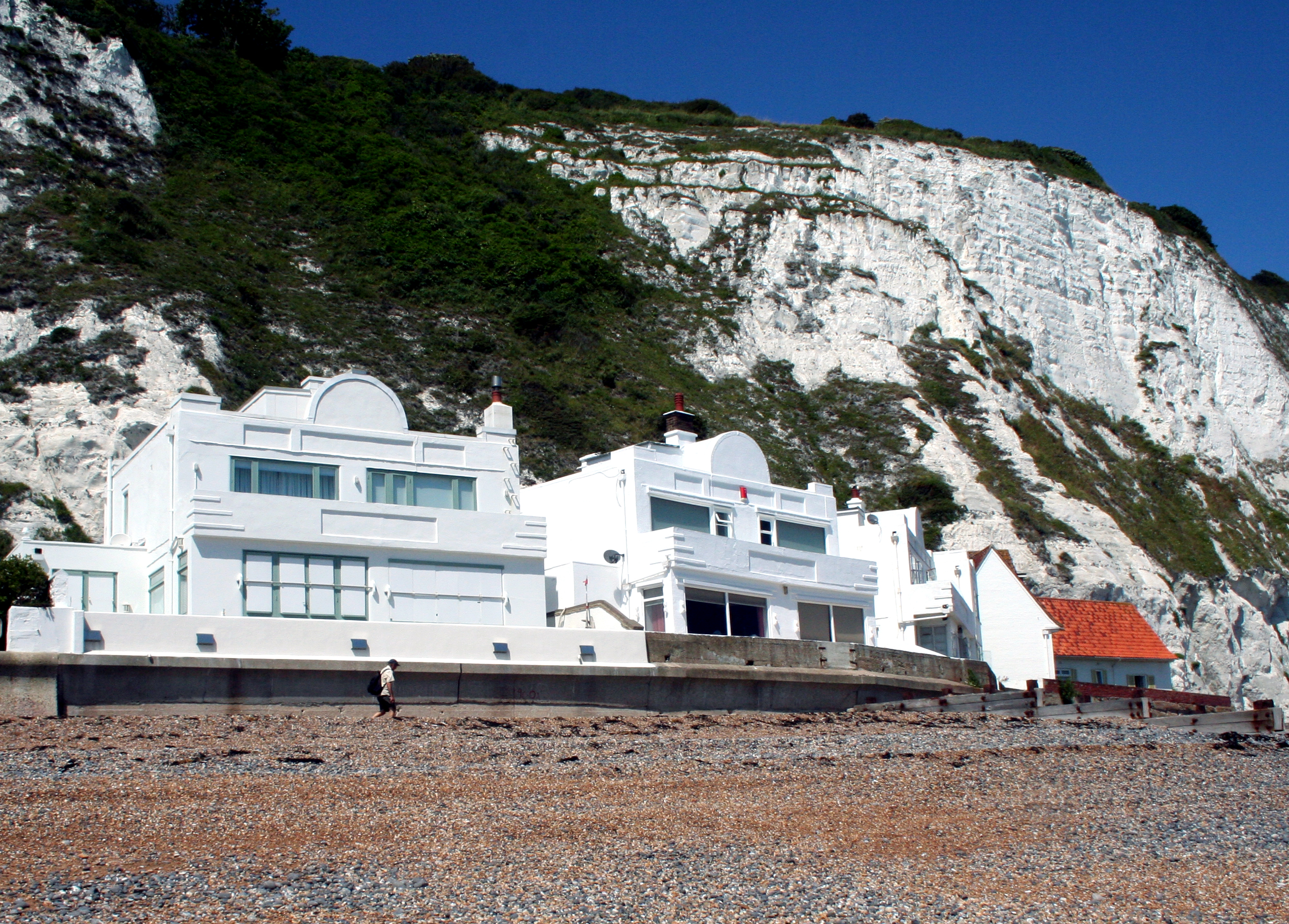
The complex from the beach

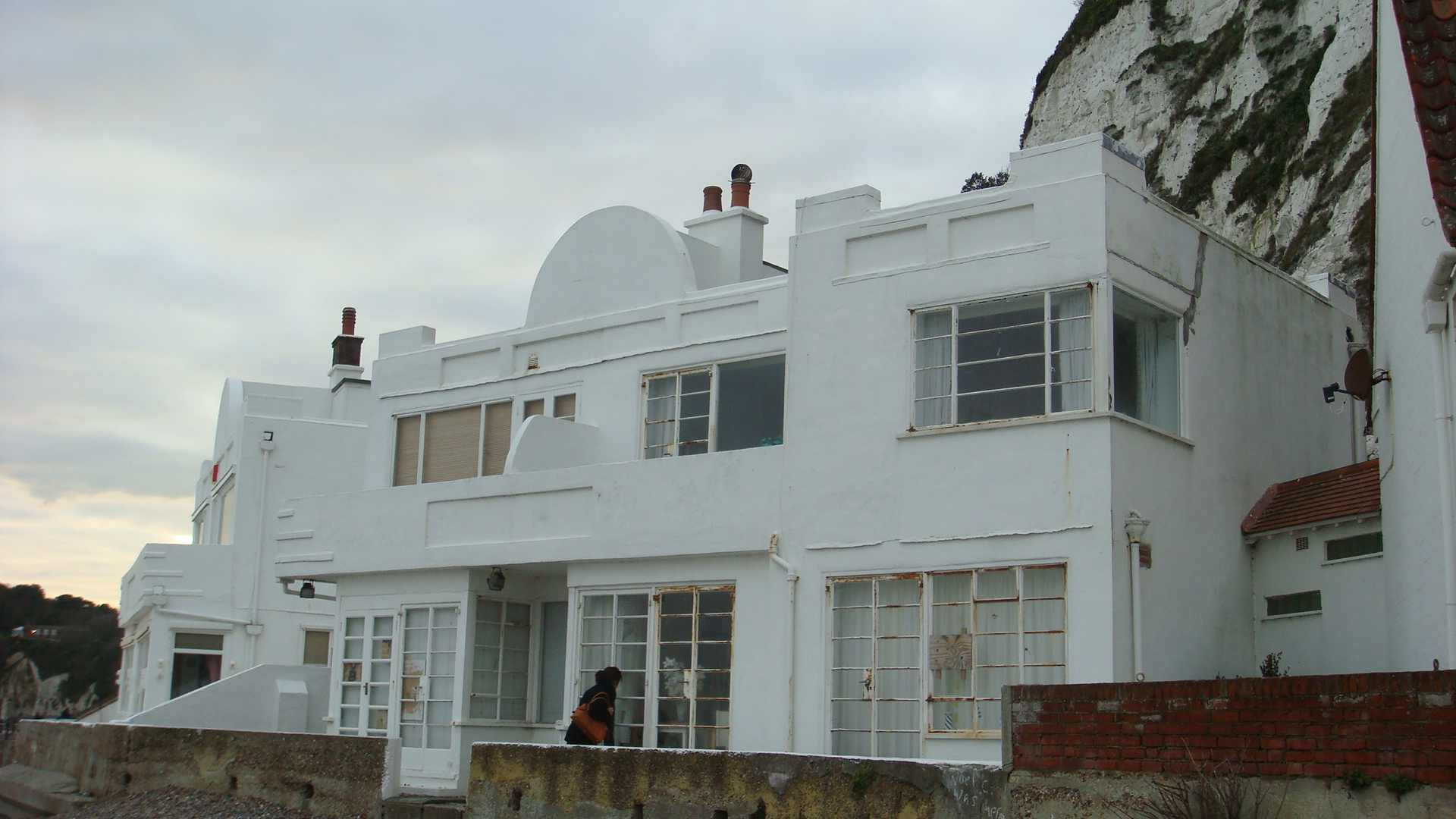
The middle cottage

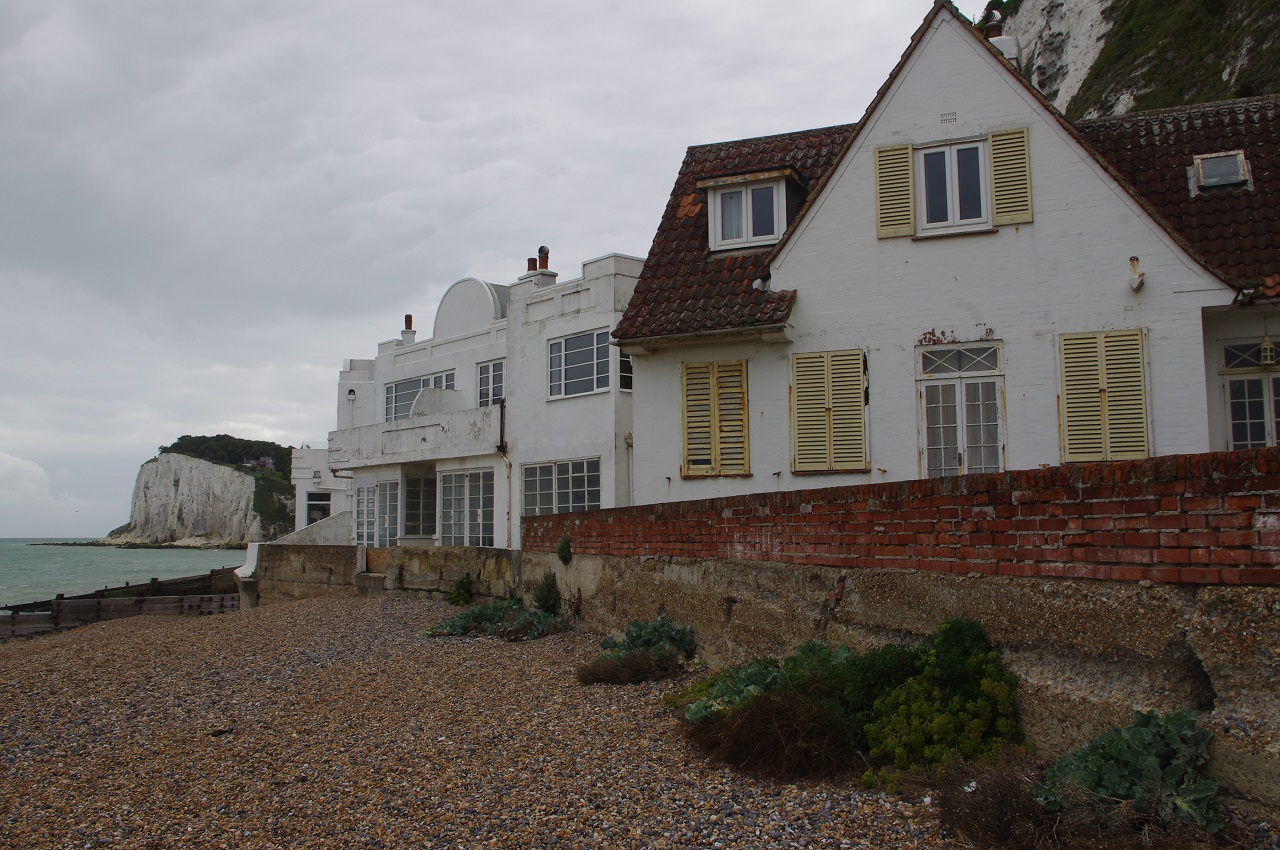
The end cottage in the complex

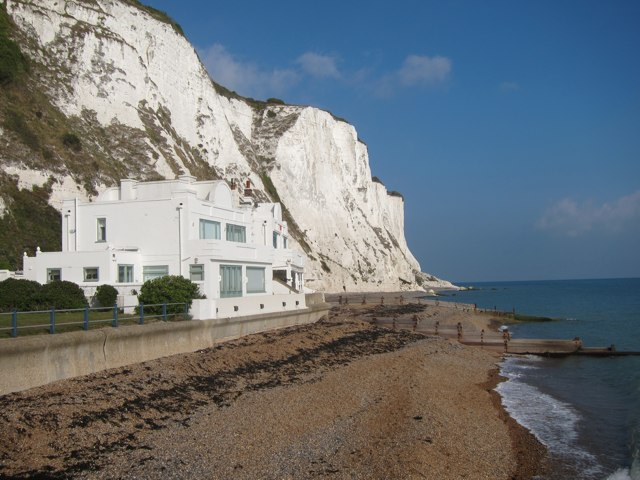
View showing the complex's proximity to the English Channel

== See also ==
- Chalet Covar - Coward's home in Switzerland from 1958-1973
- Firefly Estate - Coward's home in Jamaica
- Goldenhurst Farm - Coward's country home in Aldington, Kent from 1926-1956

== Sources ==
- Coward, Noël (1982). Graham Payn; Sheridan Morley (eds.). The Noël Coward Diaries. London: Weidenfeld and Nicolson. ISBN 0-297-78142-1.
- — (2007). Barry Day (ed.). The Letters of Noël Coward. London: Methuen Drama. ISBN 978-0-7136-8578-7.
- Dover District Council (2023). St Margaret's Bay conservation area (PDF).
- Newman, John (2013) [1969]. Kent: North-East and East. The Buildings Of England. New Haven, US and London: Yale University Press. ISBN 9780300185065. OCLC 857109148.
