= Goldenhurst Farm =

Grade II listed house in Kent, England

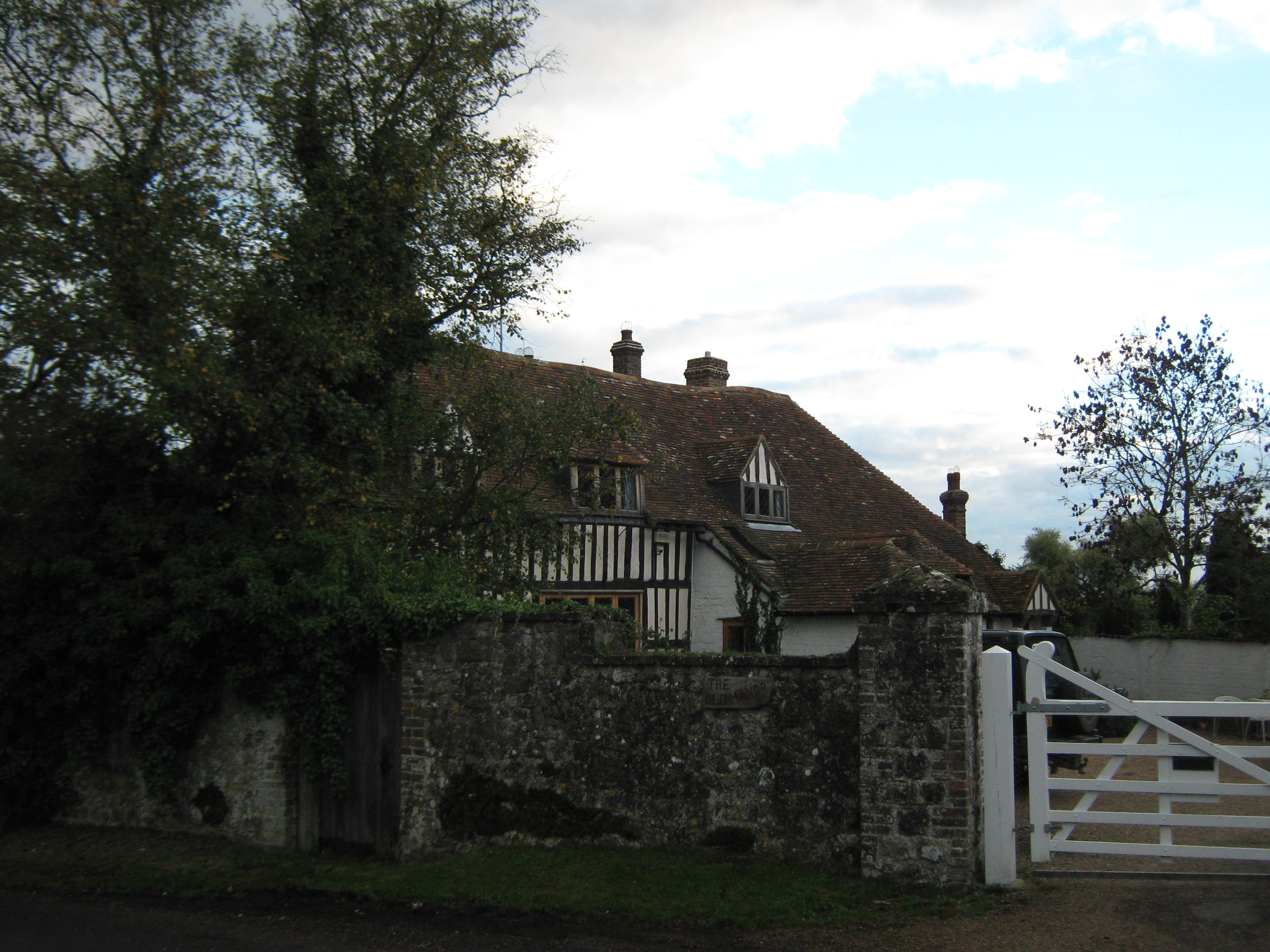
- The Old House, part of the now-subdivided Goldenhurst Farm

- Location within Kent
- Alternative names: Goldenhurst Manor / The Old House, Goldenhurst

General information
- Type: Country house
- Location: Aldington, Kent
- Coordinates: 51.0751°N 0.9517°E
- Owner: Noël Coward (1926–56); Julian Clary (2006-18)

Design and construction
- Designations: Grade II listed

Goldenhurst Farm (now Goldenhurst Manor and The Old House, Goldenhurst) is a country house of 17th-century origins in the village of Aldington, Kent, England. From 1926 to 1956, it was the country home of Noël Coward. It is a Grade II listed building.

== Coward 1926–56 ==
Coward found the property after placing an advert in the Kentish Times and receiving only one reply. Initially renting the farm from a Mr Body, Coward bought it in 1927. In extensive rebuilding and renovation in 1927–9, he linked together "the farmhouse, the square edifice, one of the barns and an adjoining cottage" to create a substantial country house.

He wrote Cavalcade at Goldenhurst in 1931. During the Second World War the house was requisitioned by the Army and Coward moved temporarily to White Cliffs, a house he rented at St Margaret's Bay. He finally returned to Goldenhurst in December 1951, recording in his diary; "We arrived at 1.55 - the house and land seemed to envelop me in a warm and lovely welcome. We spent the day hanging more pictures etc. Utterly exhausted but deeply and profoundly happy. I am home again." But the post-war tax regime made the expense of running the large house increasingly burdensome and in 1956 Coward sold the farm and his London home on Gerald Road. In a letter to Laurence Olivier the following year, he explained; "Goldenhurst (five gardeners all year round, lighting, heat etc.) was costing a fortune." He moved abroad as a tax-avoidance measure, dividing his time between Chalet Covar, at Les Avants in Switzerland and, firstly Bermuda, and then Firefly, his home in Jamaica. (Note: A piano Coward bought for Goldenhurst in 1926, and which was removed to Graham Payn’s London home in 1956, sold at Christie’s in December 2000.) Coward died at Firefly in 1973, and was buried there.

== Description ==
The house is timber-framed, of brick and Kentish ragstone, with a tiled roof and is now sub-divided into two separate properties.

Between 2006 and 2018, part of the house was home to the comedian and novelist Julian Clary. The gardens of Goldenhurst were featured in the 2017 book The Secret Gardeners by Victoria Summerley and photographer Hugo Rittson Thomas.

== See also ==
- Chalet Covar - Coward's home in Switzerland from 1958-1973
- Firefly Estate - Coward's country home in Jamaica from 1950-1973
- White Cliffs - Coward's country home in St Margaret's Bay, Kent from 1946-1951

== Sources ==
- Coward, Noël (1982). Graham Payn; Sheridan Morley (eds.). The Noël Coward Diaries. London: Weidenfeld and Nicolson. ISBN 0-297-78142-1.
- Coward, Noël (2007). Barry Day (ed.). The Letters of Noël Coward. London: Methuen Drama. ISBN 978-0-7136-8578-7.
- Tinniswood, Adrian (2016). The Long Weekend: Life in the English Country House between the Wars. London: Random House. ISBN 978-1-4481-9124-6.
- Summerley, Victoria; Rittson Thomas, Hugo (2017). The Secret Gardeners. London: Francis Lincoln. ISBN 9-78071-123763-6.
