= Cole Lesley =

English aide (1910–1980)

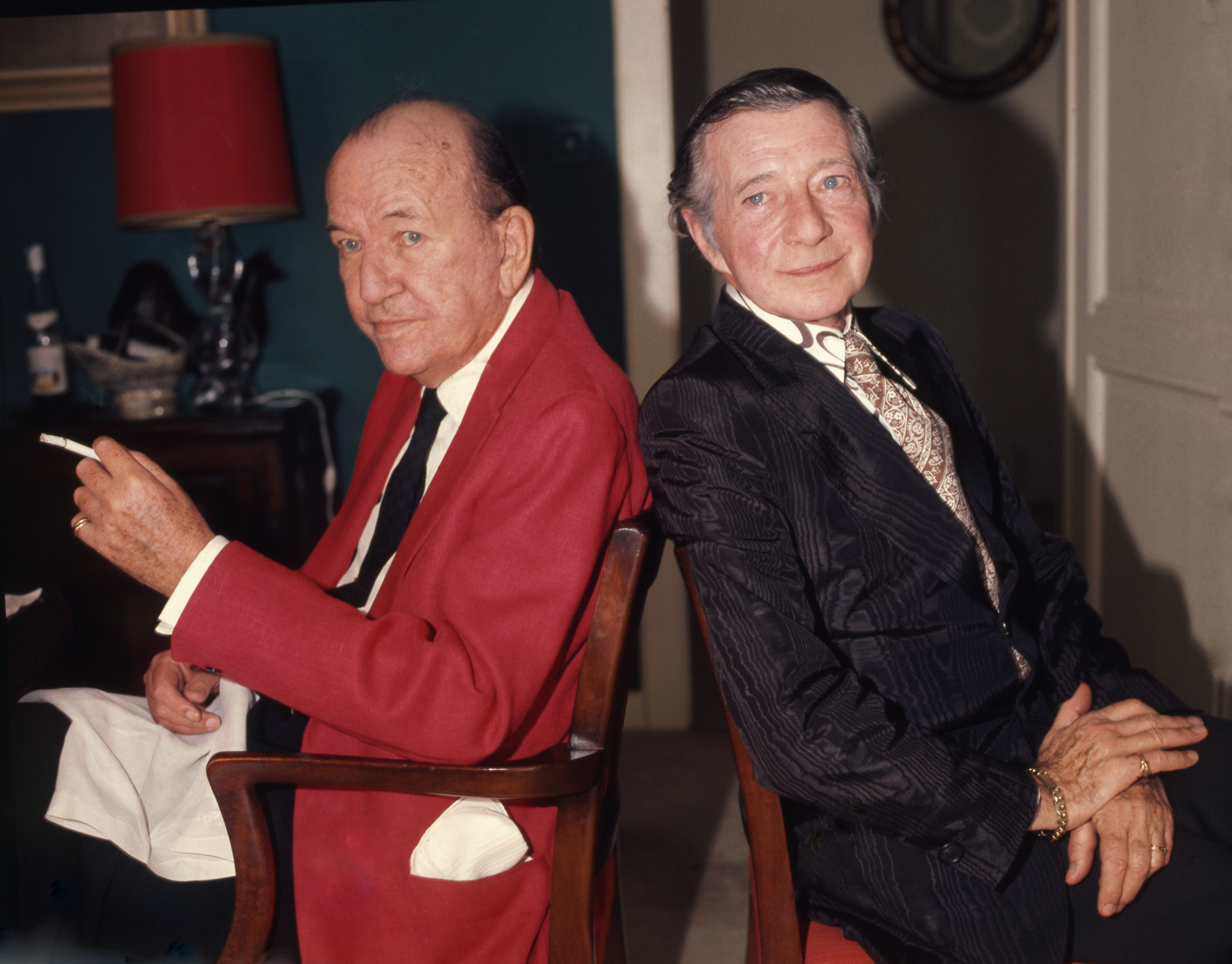
Lesley, right, with Noël Coward at Chalet Covar, 1972

Cole Lesley (11 August 1910 – 4 January 1980) was assistant to and close friend and biographer of the writer and actor, Noël Coward. After Coward's death in 1973, Lesley became trustee of the Coward Estate together with Coward's partner, Graham Payn. He was born Leonard Cole, but changed his name to suit Coward's preferences. Three years after Coward's death, Lesley published his official biography, titled The Life of Noel Coward in Britain and Remembered Laughter in its American edition.

== Life and career ==
=== Early years ===
Lesley was born as Leonard John Cole, on 11 August 1910 in Dartford, Kent, in south-east England, to Scottish parents, John and Leggie Cole. He worked as a shop assistant, and although stage-struck he recognised that he lacked the ability to be an actor, and instead he hoped for employment as a domestic servant to a leading star. When a friend told him in 1936 that Coward was looking for "a cook-cum-dogsbody" he applied for the post. Coward's secretary, Lorn Lorraine, interviewed him and he was appointed for a probationary period as both cook and valet.

At first, Coward took little notice of his new employee, but came to value his discretion and loyalty. Coward hated the name "Leonard" and to accommodate him Cole became "Leslie". Disliking being addressed by his surname, he switched his two names around and became "Cole Lesley". When he became part of Coward's inner circle of adopted family, he would be addressed familiarly as "Coley". (Note: Graham Payn said that the key members of Coward's adopted "family" were Lorn Loraine (his secretary), Gladys Calthrop (designer), Joyce Carey (actress), Clemence Dane (author and artist) and Lesley and himself.) The only other man in Coward's circle with the given name Cole was Cole Porter and the coincidence of their first names may, in Lesley's view, have been the reason why the two did not get on.

=== Post-war ===
After serving in the army during the Second World War, Lesley rejoined Coward's employment, but now as his secretary rather than his personal servant. (Lorraine became Coward's "representative".) Lesley's wartime replacement, Bert Lister, said of him, "He had far more brains than Coward. He translated Coward's plays in French and taught Noël how to speak French". The biographer Philip Hoare records that Lesley became "essential to Coward's professional and private well-being" but in 1949 when Coward moved to a house built for him in Jamaica, Lesley refused to join him there. He had embarked on his first long-term relationship and declined to be away from the flat he shared with his partner, Claude, in Burton Mews, Belgravia.

For the 1951 Lyric Revue at the Lyric Theatre, Hammersmith, and later in the West End, which included numbers by Coward, Michael Flanders, Donald Swann, Richard Addinsell and Arthur Macrae, Lesley and Coward's partner, Graham Payn, contributed a song, "This Seems to be the Moment" (words by Lesley, music by Payn).

Lesley later relented in his refusal to leave London, and he frequently spent much of his time in Jamaica with Coward, among other things helping him to write After the Ball (1954) and Look After Lulu (1958). Lesley said that for the former, "I cut out the more glaringly melodramatic of Wilde's lines and divided the remainder into sections ending with a suitable 'cue for a song'". Of the latter, Coward noted in his diary, "Coley arrived last Monday and by slogging away for two or three hours every morning, with him typing in the afternoon, we have managed to inject some wit and tempo into the first act ... it is now much shorter and, I hope, fairly funny".

=== After Coward ===
Lesley and Payn were with Coward in Jamaica when he died on 25 March 1973. He left most of his estate to the two, with the stipulation that they should seek the advice of the theatre historians Raymond Mander and Joe Mitchenson and the biographer and critic Sheridan Morley on the continuing use of Coward's theatrical works. James Pope-Hennessy was appointed to write the authorised biography, but he was killed in January 1974 and, in the words of The Times, "Lesley, with his inside knowledge of the life of the master, was a natural choice for biographer and in the event proved himself a writer also and produced a stylish work". The result, published in 1976 in Britain as The Life of Noel Coward (Note: Lesley's biography refers to Coward as "Noel" rather than "Noël": "...I have also forgone the use of his beloved diaeresis over the 'e' in his name, having no wish to dizzy the eye of the reader.") and in the US as Remembered Laughter became a best-seller. Coward was publicly reticent throughout his life about his homosexuality, but he encouraged Lesley to be open about it after his (Coward's) death. Nevertheless, although the book was well reviewed, some critics felt that the author had been excessively discreet about the private life of its subject.

Lesley, Payn and Morley collaborated on another book, Noël Coward and his Friends, published in 1979. Lesley was the posthumous dedicatee of The Noël Coward Diaries, edited by Payn and Morley and published in 1982.

As well as two houses – Blue Harbour and Firefly – in Jamaica, Coward had a château in Switzerland at Les Avants, which he described as "roomy but fairly hideous" and renamed "Chalet Covar" (the local pronunciation of his surname). In his will he left Blue Harbour to Lesley and Firefly to Payn; the first was sold and the second was given to the Jamaican Heritage Trust. Lesley and Payn lived at Les Avants, left to them both.

Lesley died in his sleep at Les Avants on 4 January 1980, aged 69. The newspaper obituaries contained various inaccuracies: The Times and The Daily Telegraph gave his age as 65; The New York Times gave it as 70. Several stated that Leslie (rather than Leonard) was Lesley's birth name; some, including the Telegraph, said that Coward had assumed Cole was a given name, not realising his mistake for five years and then insisting that the name should remain as Cole Lesley.

== Notes, references and sources ==
=== Sources ===
- Coward, Noël (2007). Barry Day (ed.). The Letters of Noël Coward. London: Methuen. ISBN 978-1-4081-0675-4.
- Coward, Noël (1982). Graham Payn; Sheridan Morley (eds.). The Noël Coward Diaries (1941–1969). London: Methuen. ISBN 978-0-297-78142-4.
- Hoare, Philip (1995). Noël Coward, A Biography. London: Sinclair-Stevenson. ISBN 978-1-4081-0675-4.
- Lesley, Cole (1976). The Life of Noël Coward. London: Cape. ISBN 978-0-224-01288-1.
- Payn, Graham (1994). My Life with Noël Coward. New York: Applause Books. ISBN 978-1-55783-190-3.
