= Chalet Covar =

Home of Noël Coward in Switzerland

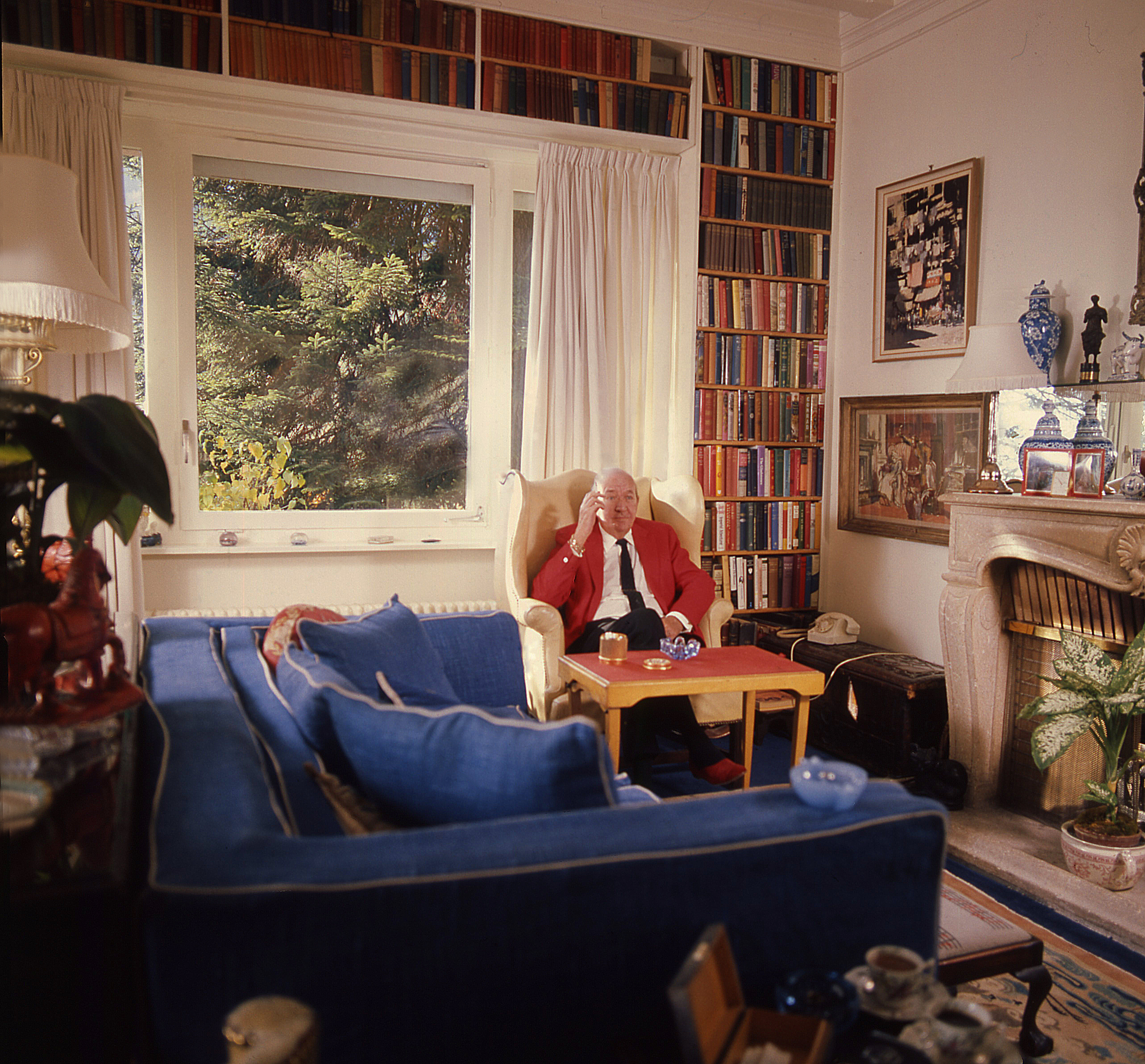
- Coward, photographed by Allan Warren at Chalet Covar, 1972

- Location within Canton of Vaud Chalet Covar (Switzerland)

General information
- Architectural style: Swiss chalet style
- Coordinates: 46°27′15″N 6°56′48″E
- Owner: Noël Coward (1956-73)

Chalet Covar, Les Avants, in the Vaud canton of Switzerland was the European home of Noël Coward from 1958 until his death in 1973.

== History and description ==
Sir Noël Peirce Coward (16 December 1899 – 26 March 1973) was an English playwright. Achieving great success in the decades between the First and the Second World Wars, in 1926 he bought a country house in Kent, Goldenhurst Farm, in Aldington, making it his home for most of the next thirty years. By the 1950s, changing tastes led to a falling off in the popularity of Coward's work. At the same time, the post-war tax regime made the expense of running a large country house increasingly burdensome and in 1956 Coward sold the farm and his London home. In a letter to Laurence Olivier the following year, he explained; "Goldenhurst (five gardeners all year round, lighting, heat etc.) was costing a fortune." He determined to move abroad as a tax-exile, a step which, while saving him money, brought him considerable public opprobrium. He made his winter home in the Caribbean, firstly in Bermuda, and then at Firefly, an estate in Jamaica; while his summers were spent in Switzerland.

The chalet at Les Avants was bought from an English couple, the Petries, in 1958, after Coward saw the property advertised in The Times. He toyed with the idea of calling the house Shilly Chalet, but finally adopted the local rendition of his own name, Chalet Covar. Coward entertained many friends at the chalet; guests included Marlene Dietrich, Richard Burton and Elizabeth Taylor, Charlie Chaplin, Lady Diana Cooper, Ingrid Bergman, Roger Moore and David Niven. A frequent visitor was Joan Sutherland, who became a neighbour after Coward found her a home, the next house up the road, Chalet Monet.

The style of the chalet was homely, rather than luxurious; Coward himself described it as "a fairly hideous chalet in the mountains" and Gyles Brandreth, who interviewed Coward's partner, Graham Payn, at the house in 1999, recalled, "its architecture, furnishings, feel – are (dare I say it?) positively mundane". After Coward's death at Firefly in 1973, Payn lived at the chalet until his own death in 2005.

== See also ==
- Firefly Estate - Coward's home in Jamaica
- Goldenhurst Farm - Coward's country home in Aldington, Kent from 1926-1956
- White Cliffs - Coward's country home in St Margaret's Bay, Kent from 1946-1951

== Sources ==
- Coward, Noël (1982). Graham Payn; Sheridan Morley (eds.). The Noël Coward Diaries. London: Weidenfeld and Nicolson. ISBN 0-297-78142-1.
- Coward, Noël (2007). Barry Day (ed.). The Letters of Noël Coward. London: Methuen Drama. ISBN 978-0-7136-8578-7.
- Lesley, Cole (1976). The Life of Noël Coward. London: Cape. ISBN 978-0-224-01288-1.
