= Firefly Estate =

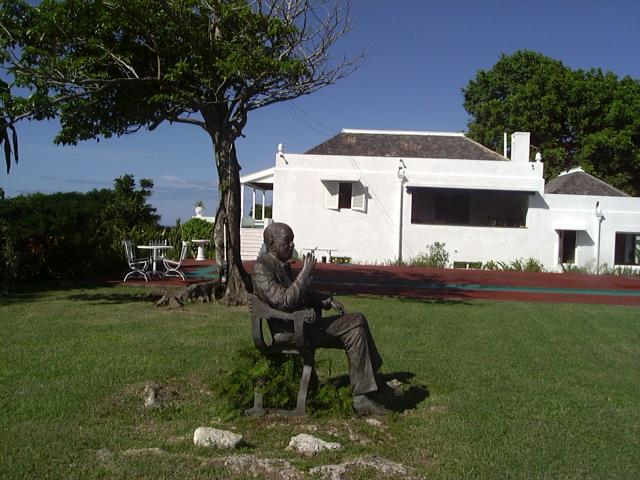
- Statue of Noël Coward by Angela Conner in front of Firefly

- Firefly Estate
- Location: Port Maria, Jamaica
- Coordinates: 18.393135°N 76.897237°W
- Type: Historic house museum

The Firefly Estate, located 10 km (6 mi) east of Oracabessa, Jamaica (18°24'17.0"N 76°56'51.0"W), was the Caribbean home of Sir Noël Coward and is the site of his grave. It is now listed as a National Heritage Site by the Jamaica National Heritage Trust. Although the setting is idyllic, the house, built in 1956, is surprisingly spartan, considering that he often entertained jet-setters and royalty. The building has been transformed into a writer's house museum.

== History ==
Noël Coward's mountaintop Jamaican home and burial site was once owned by the pirate and one-time governor of Jamaica, Sir Henry Morgan (1635-1688). Morgan had in turn purchased it from his lieutenant Lawrence Prince, who gave the estate its original name of "Lawrencefield". The property offers a commanding view of the St. Mary harbour, and Morgan used it as a lookout.

Named for the luminous insects seen in the warm evenings, Coward bought the Firefly Estate in the late 1950s, having previously lived in Bermuda. He initially used a house named Blue Harbour. He entertained a wide range of guests at Firefly, including both the Queen Mother and Queen Elizabeth II, Winston Churchill, Laurence Olivier, Sophia Loren, Marlene Dietrich, Elizabeth Taylor, Alec Guinness, Peter O'Toole, Richard Burton, and neighbours Errol Flynn, Ruth Bryan Owen and Ian Fleming. Of his time at the estate, Coward wrote in his diary: "Firefly has given me the most valuable benison of all: time to read and write and think and get my mind in order . . . I love this place, it deeply enchants me. Whatever happens to this silly world, nothing much is likely to happen here." Writing, he believed, came easier when he was here, "the sentences seemed to construct themselves, the right adjectives appeared discretely at the right moment. Firefly has magic for me."

Opening lines of Coward's last poem,
When I have fears, as Keats had fears,
Of the moment I'll cease to be,
I console myself with vanished years,
Remembered laughter, remembered tears,
And the peace of the changing sea.

— inscribed on a wall at Firefly

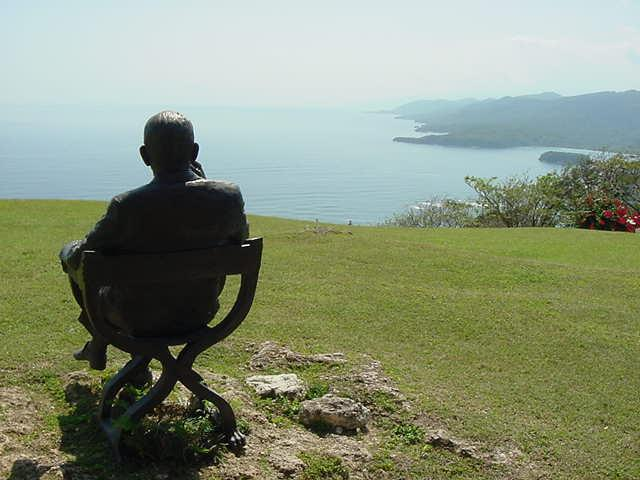
A statue of Noël Coward overlooking the Caribbean from Firefly

Coward died of myocardial infarction at Firefly on 26 March 1973, aged 73, and is buried under a marble slab in the garden, near the spot where he would sit at dusk watching the sun set as he sipped his brandy with ginger ale chaser and looked out to sea and along the coast spread out beneath him. A statue of him gazing out over the blue harbour stands on the lawn. A stone hut that was once a lookout for Henry Morgan, then converted to a bar by Coward, is now a gift shop and restaurant. The Firefly art studio holds Coward's paintings and photographs of his famous friends.

== See also ==
- Chalet Covar - Coward's home in Switzerland from 1958-1973
- Goldenhurst Farm - Coward's country home in Aldington, Kent from 1926-1956
- White Cliffs - Coward's country home in St Margaret's Bay, Kent from 1946-1951
