= Graham Payn =

South African singer and actor (1918–2005)

- Graham Payn with Mary Martin from a publicity still from the 1946 musical Pacific 1860
- Born: 25 April 1918; Pietermaritzburg, South Africa
- Died: 4 November 2005 (aged 87); Les Avants, Switzerland
- Occupations: actor, singer
- Years active: 1931–73
- Partner: Noël Coward (1945–1973; Coward's death)

Graham Payn (25 April 1918 – 4 November 2005) was a South African-born actor and singer, also known for being the life partner of the playwright Noël Coward. Beginning as a boy soprano, Payn later made a career as a singer and actor in the works of Coward and others. After Coward's death, Payn ran the Coward estate for 22 years.

== Early life ==
Payn was born in Pietermaritzburg, South Africa, the son of Francis Dawney Payn and his wife, Sybil, née Graham. He was educated in South Africa and, after his parents divorced, in England.

== Career ==
Payn made his first stage appearance, aged 13, at the London Palladium, as Curly in Peter Pan. In October 1931, he broadcast as a boy soprano on the BBC in a programme featuring Derek Oldham and Mabel Constanduros, and made further broadcasts in 1932 and 1933.

At the age of 14, he auditioned for the Noël Coward and Charles B. Cochran revue Words and Music (1932). His audition piece, singing "Nearer My God to Thee" while executing a tap dance, was so striking that Payn won two tiny parts in the revue. For 163 performances, he played a busker entertaining a cinema queue as a lead-in to the ballad "Mad About the Boy", and announced, in top hat, white jacket and shorts, the show's other hit song "Mad Dogs and Englishmen".

He first appeared in films as a boy soprano in the same year. When the revue closed, Payn signed a nine-week contract to sing in cinemas around Britain, but the tour was cancelled when his voice suddenly broke. Unemployable as a boy soprano, he returned with his mother to South Africa. During the run of Words and Music, Payn had studied tap dancing with the show's choreographer, Buddy Bradley. To make a living in South Africa he taught at dancing schools in Durban and Johannesburg, reproducing Bradley's routines.

Returning to England in 1936, Payn broadcast frequently as a light baritone on radio as well as on the new television service in variety shows in 1938 and 1939; he was also cast in radio plays. His first adult role in the West End came a fortnight before the outbreak of World War II, in Douglas Furber's song and dance show, Sitting Pretty, after which all the theatres were closed. Payn volunteered for the army but was discharged on health grounds after a few weeks because of a hernia.

In 1941 and 1942, he appeared in Up and Doing, a revue, with Leslie Henson, Binnie Hale, Cyril Ritchard and Stanley Holloway, and its successor Fine and Dandy, with the cast unchanged except for Dorothy Dickson replacing Binnie Hale. In the latter show Payn and Patricia Burke sang Rodgers and Hart's "This Can't Be Love" and later, Coward's "London Pride". One night, Coward came backstage after the performance. Payn later wrote, "I remember being very nervous, not having seen him for the best part of 10 years, though I was pleased as punch to be recognised in my own right." Coward's verdict was, "Very good. Splendid."

In Magic Carpet, Payn appeared with Sydney Howard and then, after The Lilac Domino (1944), he played Lewis Carroll, the Mock Turtle and Tweedledum in Clemence Dane and Richard Addinsell's musical version of Alice in Wonderland (1944). In the Leslie Henson show Gaieties (1945) Payn and Walter Crisham sang and danced "White Tie and Tails". Coward came backstage after a performance and offered Payn a leading part in his forthcoming show, Sigh No More, which, Payn wrote in his memoirs, "marked the beginning of a personal and professional relationship between Noël and myself that would last until his death."

=== Association with Coward ===
Coward continually promoted Payn's career. He was widely thought to overrate his protégé's talents. Payn received consistently good notices for his performances, but lacked drive and star quality, as he himself knew. Coward also eventually came to realise it, writing: "He is, I fear, a born drifter. I know his theatrical career has been a failure but there are other ploys to go after. He sleeps and sleeps, and the days go by. I love him dearly and for ever, but this lack of drive in any direction is a bad augury for the future. I am willing and happy to look after him for the rest of my life, but he must do something."

In 1951, Payn returned to revue at the Lyric Theatre, Hammersmith. The Lyric Revue had material by several contributors, including Coward, Flanders and Swann and Payn himself; he and Cole Lesley, Coward's assistant, contributed the song "This Seems to be the Moment". The show was such a success at Hammersmith that it transferred to the West End. The following year there was a second edition, The Globe Revue, which ran for six months. Coward cast Payn in an American revival of some of his Tonight at 8.30 plays, with Gertrude Lawrence. They were well received on tour but failed on Broadway. In London, Payn appeared in Coward's new works, Pacific 1860, Ace of Clubs, After the Ball, and Waiting in the Wings. Payn's performances were well reviewed, but the shows were unsuccessful. In the 1960s, he played the supporting role of Morris Dixon in Present Laughter.

=== Film ===
Payn also did some film work. In 1949, he was in the Borstal drama Boys in Brown, with Dirk Bogarde and Richard Attenborough. He appeared in two films with Coward: The Astonished Heart (1950) and The Italian Job (1969), in which Coward played a criminal mastermind with Payn as his obsequious assistant.

Filmography

Year	Title	Role	Notes
1949	Boys in Brown	Plato Cartwright	
1950	The Astonished Heart	Tim Verney	
1962	Jigsaw	Mr. Blake	Uncredited
1969	The Italian Job	Keats	(final film role)

== Later life and death ==
After Coward died in 1973, Payn's career for the rest of his life became the administration of the Coward estate. The Coward authority Barry Day wrote, "It was not a job he ever wanted or expected but he brought to it a dedication and focus that Noël would have been surprised and pleased to see. [He] was thrust into his biggest role and played it as he knew Noël would have wanted him to. It was a fitting farewell performance." Coward's biographer, Philip Hoare, wrote, "Graham disproved his partner's assessment of himself as 'an illiterate little sod' by publishing his memoir and by managing the Coward estate. He was a generous, uncomplicated man, and he will be missed by his many friends."

Payn wrote Noël Coward and His Friends (1979) with Sheridan Morley and Cole Lesley, and, with Morley, was co-editor of The Noël Coward Diaries (1982), which they dedicated to Lesley. Payn wrote his autobiography, My Life With Noël Coward, in 1994.

In 1988, 15 years after Coward's death, Payn, who "hadn't the heart to use it again", gave their Jamaican home, the Firefly Estate, to the Jamaica National Heritage Trust. He retained their other home, Chalet Covar, at Les Avants in Switzerland, where he died in 2005, aged 87.
