= Les Avants =

Village and ski resort in Vaud, Switzerland

Coordinates: 46°27′13″N 6°56′39″E

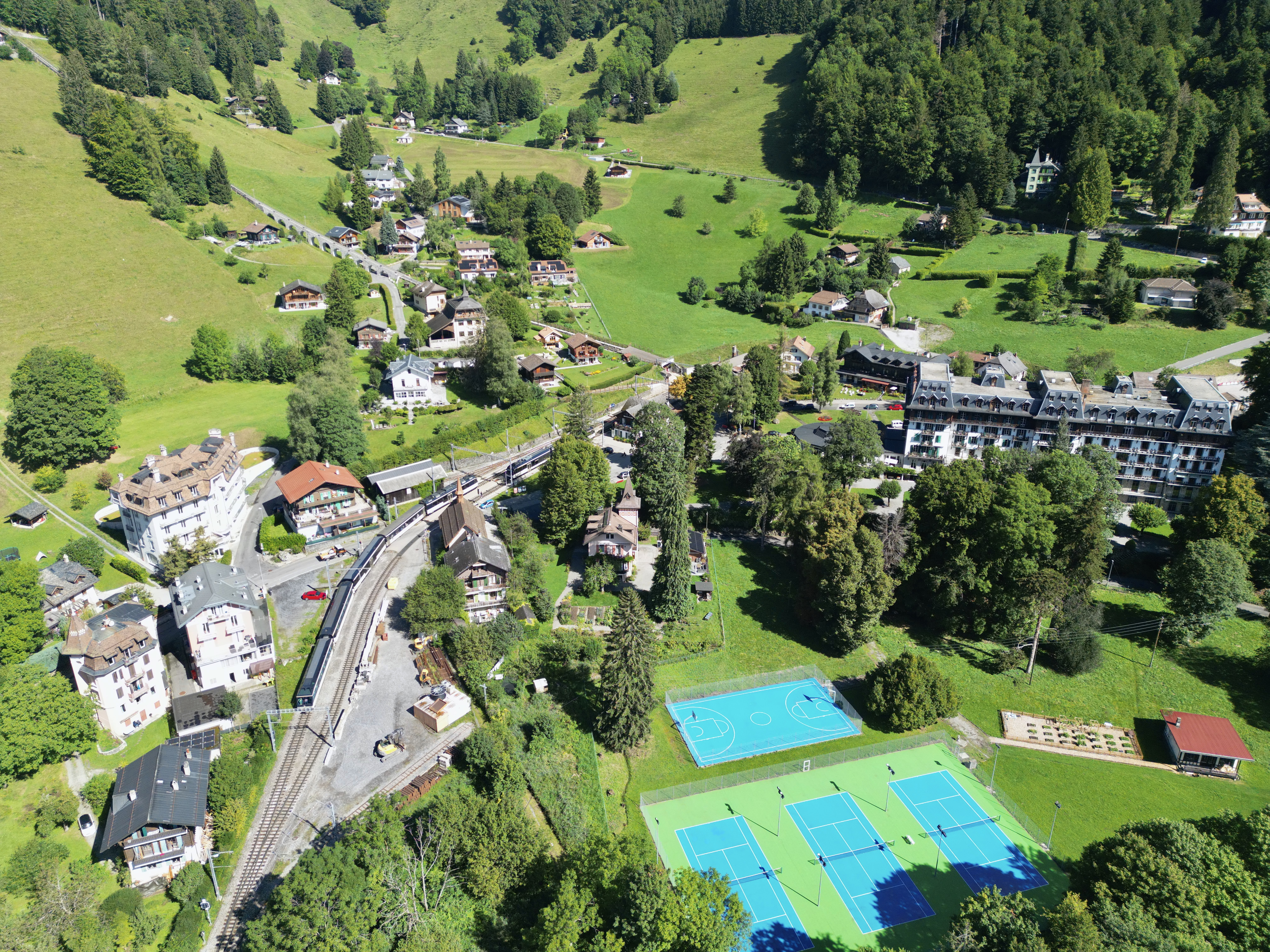
Aerial view of Les Avants (2024)

Aerial view of Les Avants (1948)

Les Avants is a village in the canton of Vaud in Switzerland. It is located in the municipality of Montreux, in the east of the canton, in the district of Riviera-Pays-d'Enhaut. It lies 3.5 km (2.2 mi) north-east of the town of Montreux and 25 km (16 mi) east of Lausanne.

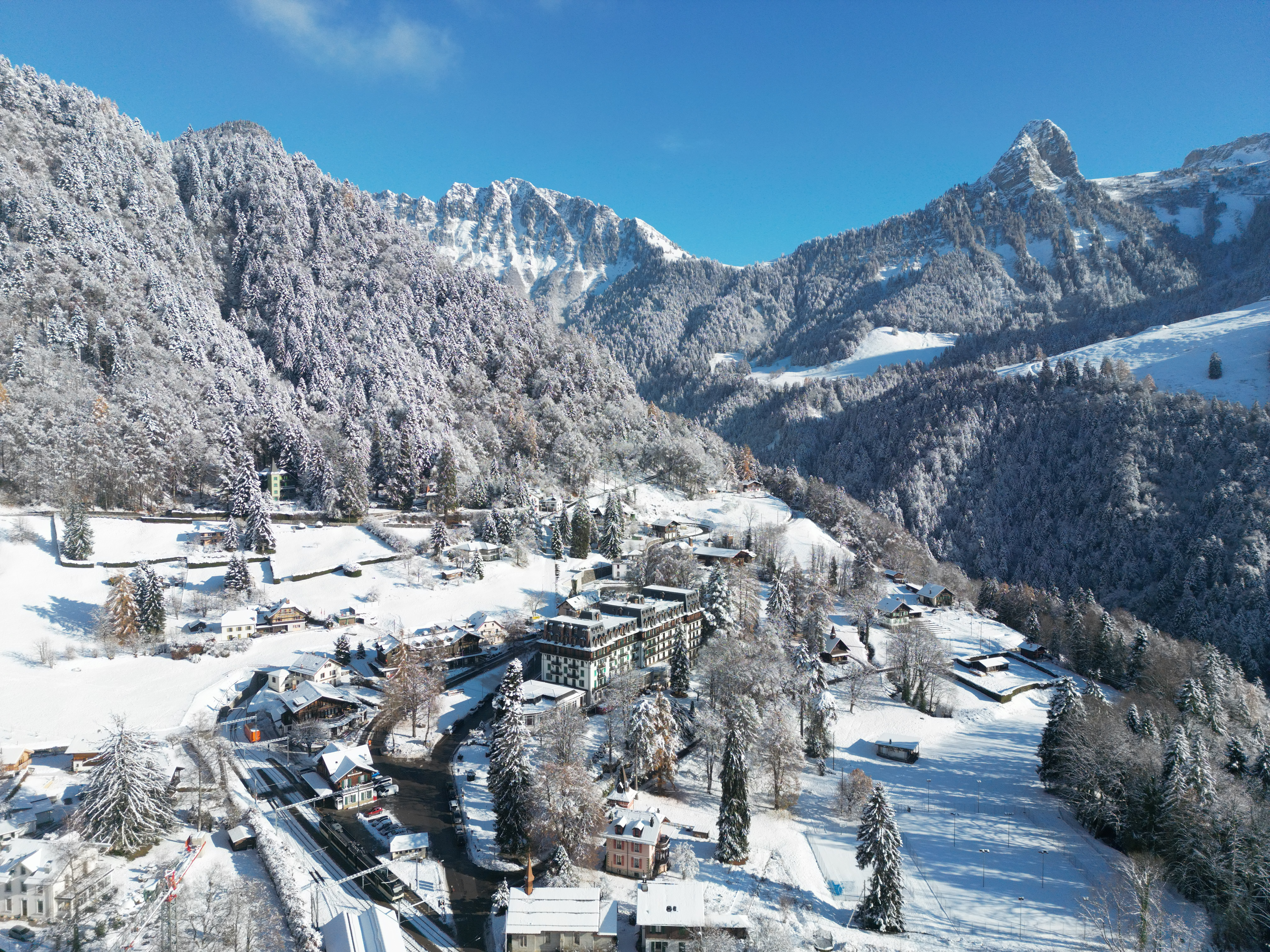
Aerial view of Les Avants, winter season (2022)

== History and description ==
Les Avants is a winter resort in the Vaud Alps. The village was developed as a ski resort in the 19th century by the Dufour family. They constructed the ski slopes and built a hotel, Grand Hotel des Avants, to accommodate visitors. In 1872, an Anglican chapel was built in the grounds of the hotel for the benefit of English visitors. The village hosted the first Ice Hockey European Championship, in 1910 and gives its name to the Chemin de fer Les Avants – Sonloup. Opened in 1901 as the first stage of the Montreux–Lenk im Simmental line, it connects Montreux to Les Avants and Sonloup, 0.5 km (0.31 mi) to the northwest. The hotel closed after the Second World War and has since served as a school, currently Le Châtelard international boarding school. Ernest Hemingway stayed at the resort in the 1920s, and recalls the village in his memoir, A Moveable Feast.

=== Notable residents ===
Singer and lyricist Ian Dury lived there with his mother for a short period in the 1940s. The village was home to the opera singer Dame Joan Sutherland and her husband, the conductor Richard Bonynge, who lived at the Chalet Monet. Sutherland's home was found for her by Noël Coward, a long-time friend and fellow resident of Les Avants. Coward had bought his own home, further down the mountain from Chalet Monet, in August 1959. Having toyed with the idea of calling the house Shilly Chalet, Coward adopted the local rendition of his own name, Chalet Covar. After Coward's death at Firefly, their other home in Jamaica, in 1973, his partner Graham Payn lived at the chalet until his own death in 2005.

== Sources ==
- Coward, Noël (2007). Barry Day (ed.). The Letters of Noël Coward. London: Bloomsbury Publishing. ISBN 978-1-408-14768-9.
