= Aldington, Kent =

Village in Kent, England

Coordinates: 51.093611°N 0.941111°E

Aldington
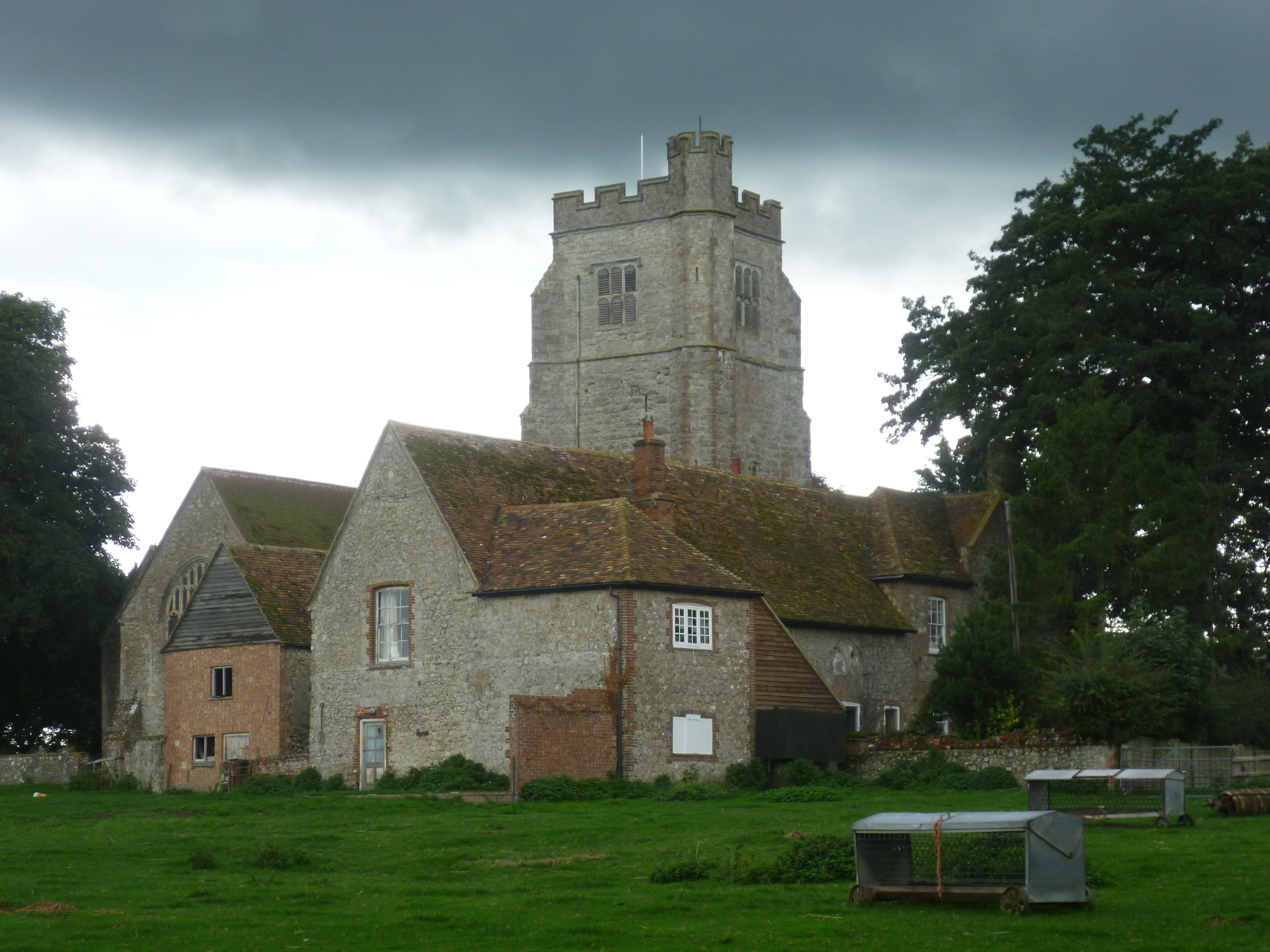
- St Martin’s Church, Aldington

- Location within Kent
- Area: 18.23 km^{2} (7.04 sq mi)
- Population: 1,573 (Civil Parish 2021)
  - Density: 86/km^{2} (220/sq mi)
- OS grid reference: TR063365
- Civil parish: Aldington
- District: Ashford
- Shire county: Kent
- Region: South East
- Country: England
- Sovereign state: United Kingdom
- Post town: Ashford
- Postcode district: TN25
- Dialling code: 01233
- Police: Kent
- Fire: Kent
- Ambulance: South East Coast
- UK Parliament: Weald of Kent

Aldington is a village and civil parish in the Ashford District of Kent, England. The village centre is eight miles (13 km) south-east of the town of Ashford. As with the village centre, set on a steep escarpment above agricultural Romney Marsh and the upper Stour is Aldington Knoll, which was used as a Roman burial barrow and later beacon, it has a panorama towards the English Channel and of low land such as Dungeness. At the 2021 Census the population included Bonnington.

== Geography ==
The parish is bounded to the north by the M20 motorway and the straight rail links that include High Speed 1. To the south, it drops to the Romney Marsh (about 10% of the parish lies there) to the north bank of the Royal Military Canal. It covers 3,400 acres (1,400 hectares) and has a population of 1573. The parish, part of the North Downs, is considered an Area of Outstanding Natural Beauty, and a large area is also part of the Old Romney Shoreline Special Landscape Area. The main road across the parish follows the path of a Roman road, the eastern part of which is utilised by the modern day B2067 from Hythe to Hamstreet.

Aldington Frith is difficult to separate from the village proper and forms a salient to the west along the village's main street.

== St Martin's Church ==
The area's church (the ecclesiastical parish having approximately the same boundaries as the civil parish) dates from the 12th century. Its 16th-century tower became a landmark for seamen. It is built in Perpendicular style.

== History ==
More than 50 buildings of historical or architectural interest are in the civil parish. Beside the church was one of the Archbishop of Canterbury's palaces, of which only ruins remain. Court Lodge Farmhouse was its manor house and hunting lodge, particularly favoured and improved by Archbishops Morton (1486–1500) and Warham (1508–1532), both of whom also embellished the adjacent parish Church of St Martin. The house, park and chase (1000 acres) were bought and extended by King Henry VIII in 1540, the whole complex said to have 5 kitchens, 6 stables and 8 dovecotes.

After the Napoleonic Wars, Aldington was the stronghold of The Aldington Gang, an infamous band of smugglers who roamed the marshes and shores of Kent plying their trade. The gang's leaders, Cephas Quested and George Ransley, natives of Aldington, made the Walnut Tree Inn their headquarters and drop for their contraband. High up on the southern side of the inn is a small window through which the gang would shine a signal light to their confederates on Aldington Knoll.

Aldington Knoll was one of a chain of viewpoints used for the Anglo-French Survey (1784–1790) linking the Royal Greenwich Observatory with the Paris Observatory. This ground-breaking example of early international scientific co-operation was led in England by General William Roy.

Aldington Knoll itself is the subject of local and wider legend. Traditionally, it is said to be the burial site of a giant and his sword and is protected by murderous ghouls who will kill anyone attempting to flatten the area. Ford Madox Ford's poem Aldington Knoll is inspired by this legend. Others, including H. G. Wells, on account of its lush wooded slopes, have suggested that it is the entrance to a fairyland.

In 1511, Erasmus of Rotterdam, the theologian and scholar, was appointed rector of Aldington by Archbishop Warham. He lived at the rectory next to the church in what is now called Parsonage Farm. Erasmus spoke Latin and Dutch but no English. He could, therefore, not preach to the English congregation. He resigned one year later after a kidney complaint, which he blamed on the local beer.

Elizabeth Barton, the 'Holy Maid of Kent', was born in the village in 1506. She became a maid to one of the local families but claimed that she had visions. She was provided a place in the convent at Canterbury and became a nun. Through some manipulation by Bishop John Fisher and Thomas More, she prophesied that King Henry VIII would die a villain's death if he divorced Catherine of Aragon. She was beheaded in 1534.

In August 1926, a Blériot 155 of Air Union crashed at College Farm, Hurst (in Aldington parish) killing three of the 15 passengers and crew.

== Notable inhabitants ==
Many famous literary figures have made their home here, including

- Ford Madox Ford (17 December 1873 – 26 June 1939) the novelist and publisher.
- Sir Noël Coward (16 December 1899 – 26 March 1973) the actor, playwright, and composer of popular music. Coward lived at Goldenhurst Farm from 1926 to 1956 and wrote Cavalcade at the farm in 1931.
- Bill Deedes, writer and politician.

More recently, it has been home to Noel Redding, bass player with the Jimi Hendrix Experience, comedians Vic Reeves, Paul O'Grady (Lily Savage), and Julian Clary. Clary lived in part of Noël Coward's old home, Goldenhurst Farm between 2006 and 2018.

In June 1365, the poet John Gower acquired the manor of Aldington from William Sepvanus. In September 1373, he sold a half interest in the manor to Sir J. Cobham. There is no evidence that Gower ever lived there.

It has been suggested that Erasmus was a vicar at Aldington for one year from 1511, particularly claimed by Richard Kilburne in his topography of Kent. Arthur Mee also claims that Thomas Linacre worked as a rector in St Martin's.

Elizabeth Barton was born in Aldington in 1506.

== See also ==
- Listed buildings in Aldington, Kent
