= St Margaret's at Cliffe =

Village in Kent, England

Coordinates: 51°09′12″N 1°22′20″E

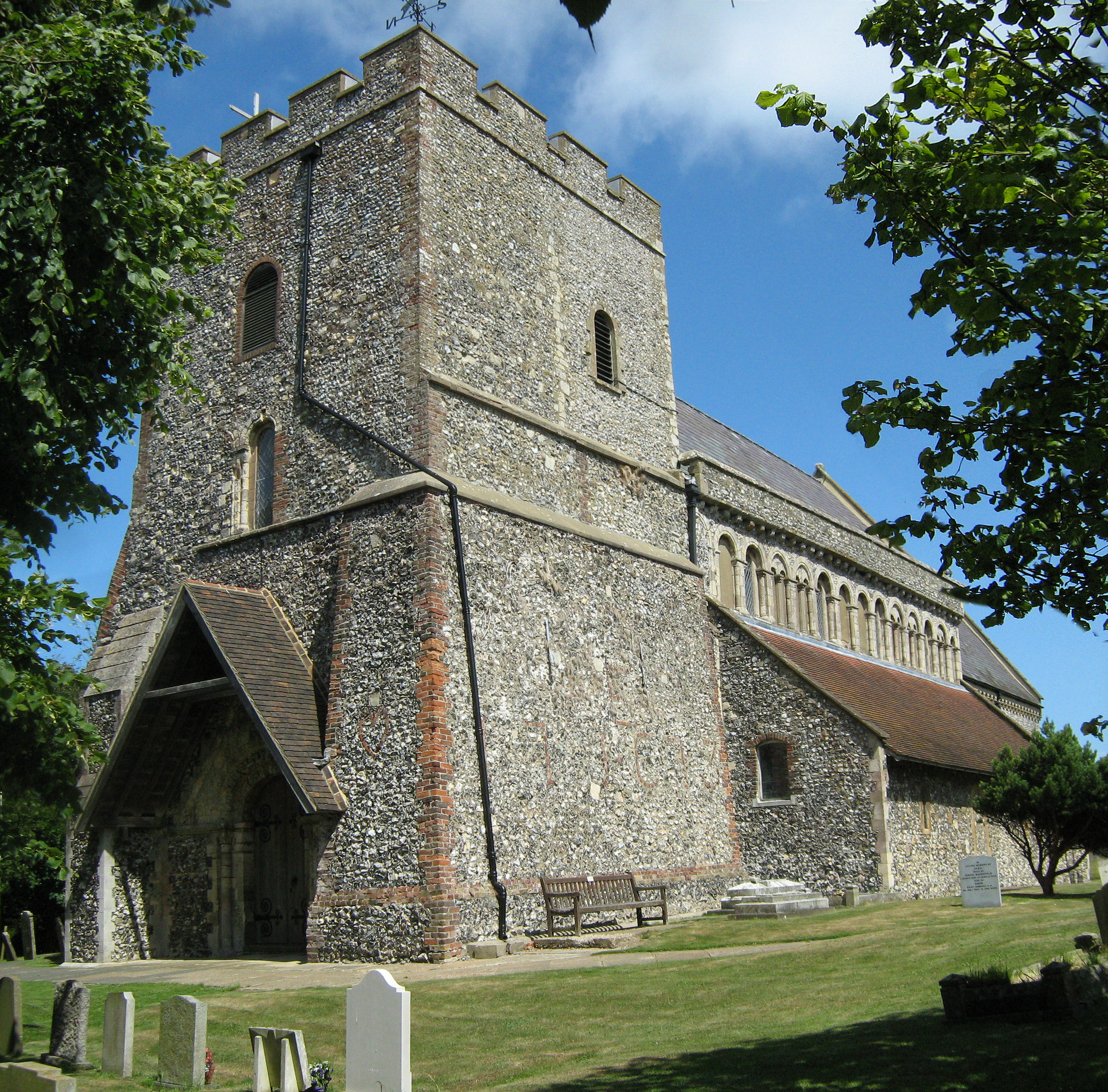
- St Margaret of Antioch Church, St Margaret's at Cliffe

- Location within Kent
- Population: 2,499 (2011 Census including Westcliffe)
- OS grid reference: TR3544
- Civil parish: St Margaret's at Cliffe
- District: Dover
- Shire county: Kent
- Region: South East
- Country: England
- Sovereign state: United Kingdom
- Post town: Dover
- Postcode district: CT15
- Police: Kent
- Fire: Kent
- Ambulance: South East Coast

St Margaret's at Cliffe is a three-part village situated just off the coast road between Deal and Dover in Kent, England. The centre of the village is about ¾ mile (1 km) from the sea, with the residential area of Nelson Park further inland, and St Margaret's Bay situated along and below the cliffs north of South Foreland. The parish church, dedicated to St Margaret of Antioch, is a Grade I listed building.

Channel swimmers and submarine telephone cables start from St Margaret's Bay. At the north end of the bay is Leathercote Point (sometimes spelt Leathercoat Point or Lethercote Point), where there is the Dover Patrol Monument war memorial commemorating the Dover Patrol. According to the International Hydrographic Organization, Leathercote Point marks the western end of the line which defines the divide between the North Sea and the English Channel, the opposite end being at the Walde Lighthouse near Calais.

== History ==
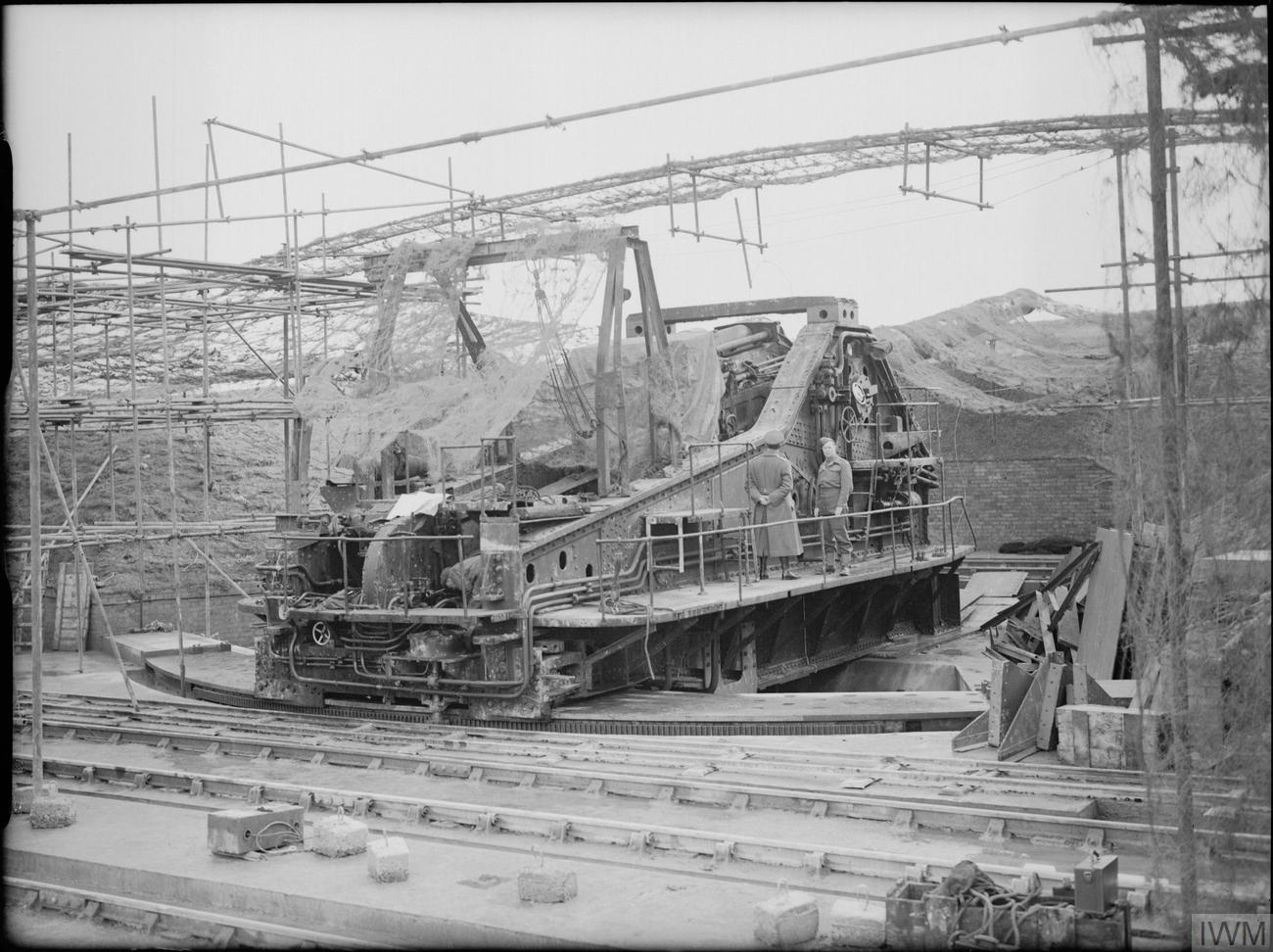
'Pooh', the second of two 14-inch guns installed in March 1941. It came from the reserve stock of guns for the 'King George V' class of battleships.

In 1851, the first successfully laid international submarine telegraph cable started here to Sangatte, France – with Thomas Russell Crampton as the responsible engineer.

During the Second World War, most of the population were moved out and guns with their attendant military personnel were moved in. Most of the guns were anti-aircraft but there were heavier pieces intended to prevent German shipping from travelling along the French coast. There were two 15 in (380 mm) guns called "Jane" and "Clem" and there were also the two famous ex-Navy BL 14 inch Mk VII naval guns called "Winnie" and "Pooh". They originally came from the battleship HMS King George V.

The parish church suffered a direct hit from German guns located in Calais, but the only damage was the destruction of a window dedicated to John Knott, lighthouse keeper of South Foreland Lighthouse.

Sir Peter Ustinov was stationed in the village during the Second World War, and bought a house on the cliffs after the war. The house is now owned by actress Miriam Margolyes, and both have hosted functions to raise funds for the new village hall.

At the other end of the beach there are cottages, two of which were owned by Noël Coward, and one which was rented by Ian Fleming.

Oxney Court, to the north east of the village, is a Grade II listed country house, dating from the 16th century. The original manor house was owned by the De Crioll family and later by the Sedley family. The adjacent church of St Nicholas is now a ruin. In the 18th century, Oxney Court was owned by the Jeken and Rose-Fuller families, who added a Gothic tower and crenellations; in the 19th century it was further remodelled for its then owner, John May of Deal and later acquired by Sir Edward Banks. The house became a school and was requisitioned for military use in World War I, and then suffered fire damage. It was restored in the 1990s as a private residence.

The village had its own fire station from 1896, a hand-cart that was manned by volunteer firemen who were residents of the village. At the start of the 20th century, a second fire shed was constructed on the beach where there was a small community existing of hotels, cafés and housing. In 1936 the village purchased its first motor fire engine and housed it next to the Hope Inn in the central village. Its first emergency call was to Wanstone Court Farm, St Margaret's. The Auxiliary Fire Service took the station over in 1939, and at the outbreak of the Second World War, the Royal Marines based in the village manned the two fire engines that were stationed there.

In 1945, it reverted to the National Fire Service, and in 1948, with the disbandment of the NFS, Kent Fire Brigade took over. A new station was built in 1970 along Reach Road, and St Margaret's became one of the first fire stations in Kent to alert the crew by Pocket Alerter instead of the traditional siren. Kent Fire Brigade was rebranded Kent Fire & Rescue Service on 1 October 2003. The station closed on 1 April 2012 along with nine other fire stations in Kent due to restructuring by Kent Fire & Rescue Service

In 2005–06, the affordable village housing in Ash Grove won the Best New Neighbourhood category in the Kent Design Awards.

There has been green energy in the village since 1929, when St Margaret's Bay Windmill was built to generate electricity.

== Governance ==
An electoral ward with the same name exists. The population of this ward at the 2011 Census was 5,169.
