= Polka Dot Door =

Canadian children's television series (1971–1993)

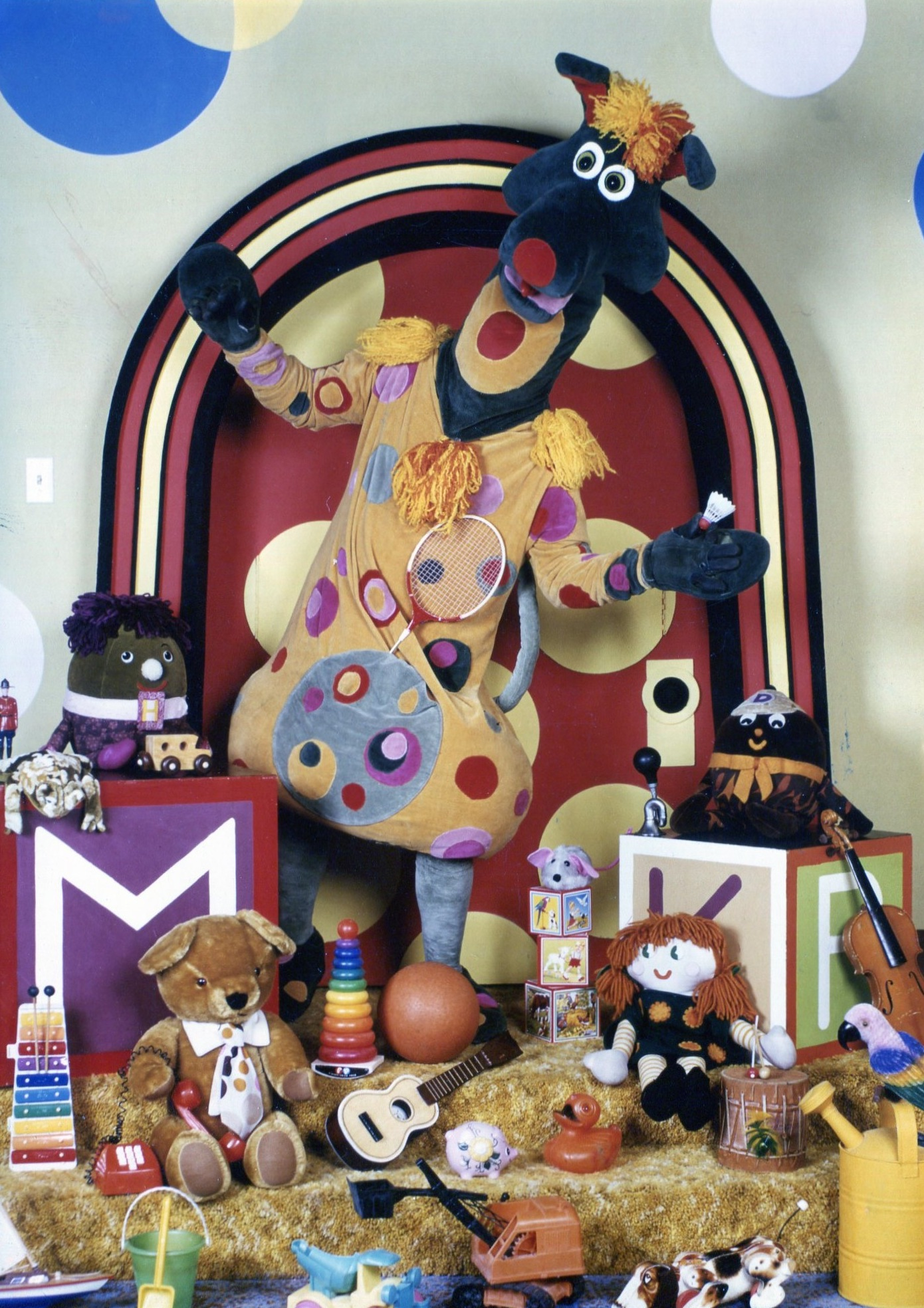
- Genre: Children's television series
- Created by: Peggy Liptrott
- Based on: BBC's Play School
- Developed by: Dr. Vera Good; Peggy Liptrott; L. Ted Coneybeare; Marnie Patrick Roberts; Dr. Ada Schermann; Dick Derhodge; Pat Patterson; Dodi Robb
- Written by: Pat Patterson; Dodi Robb; Jed MacKay; Emily Hearn; Fran Handman; Ian Ritchie; Susan Murgatroyd; Nancy Crystal; Lori Hauser; Anne McCourt; Clive Endersby; Mary MacKay-Smith; Carmel Suttor; L. Ted Coneybeare
- Directed by: Peggy Liptrott (1971); Ian Morris; Susan Murgatroyd (1979–1984); David Moore (1983; 1985–1993); Douglas Williams (1987)
- Presented by: Various
- Theme music composer: Herbie Helbig
- Country of origin: Canada
- Original language: English
- No. of seasons: 22
- No. of episodes: 383

Production
- Executive producer: Dr. Vera Good (1971–1972)
- Producers: Peggy Liptrott (1971); L. Ted Coneybeare (1972–1984); Jed MacKay (1985–1993)
- Production locations: Toronto, Ontario, Canada
- Running time: 30 minutes
- Production company: TVOntario

Original release
- Network: TVOntario
- Release: March 30, 1971 – July 27, 1993

Related
- Polka Dot Shorts; Gisèle's Big Backyard

Polka Dot Door is a Canadian children's television series which was produced by the Ontario Educational Communications Authority (later known as TVOntario) from 1971 to 1993. The series features two hosts who speak directly to the home viewing audience.

The content of the shows was generally geared towards education and creativity. Each week of episodes focused on a single theme with each weekday assigned a different "motif" in which the theme was explored in different ways (For example, Tuesdays were "Dress-Up Day" in which the hosts would use costumes to explore the theme).

One of the most well-known elements of the series was the "Polkaroo", a mythical character whose name combines the words "polka dot" and "kangaroo". Normally played by the male host in costume, the Polkaroo would appear to the female host to perform a mime; upon the second host's return, he would typically express disappointment when informed that he had once again missed the Polkaroo. In earlier years, the Polkaroo appeared just once per week on "Imagination Day", but due to the character's popularity, additional appearances were added later in the show's run.

Another feature of the show was "looking through the polka-dot-door", usually on "Finding-Out Day", when the camera would zoom in to a special dot on the door, which would open up to reveal a short educational film.

== Creation and history ==
Polka Dot Door was created and developed by a team of employees from TVOntario, hired and led by original series producer and director Peggy Liptrott.

Significant contributors to the creation and development of the series in 1971 included executive producer Vera Good, who laid the conceptual foundation of the show, educational supervisor Marnie Patrick Roberts, educational consultant L. Ted Coneybeare, script writers and composers Pat Patterson and Dodi Robb, animator Dick Derhodge (who designed the familiar opening/closing animation) and Dr. Ada Schermann, a professor at the prestigious Institute of Child Study in Toronto who was consulted in the early stages of Polka Dot Door's development and is responsible for giving the show its name.

New episodes of Polka Dot Door originally aired on TVOntario Monday to Friday beginning in the fall of 1971 until the show's cancellation in 1993, with reruns running in constant rotation both on weekdays and weekends well into the 1990s.

The show itself was an adaptation of the BBC children's show Play School. Initially, many aspects and concepts of Play School were licensed by TVOntario for use on Polka Dot Door. These include designs of some of the stuffed toys used in the show, which were similar to those used in Play School as well as educational film inserts/segments which were shown to viewers "Through the Arched Window" on Play School and "Through the Polka Dot Door" on Polka Dot Door.

Dodi Robb helped distinguish Polka Dot Door with her creation and addition of the Polkaroo, combining the show's title with the word Kangaroo. Polkaroo would reprise his role every Thursday (Imagination Day), appearing to only one of the two hosts (the other dressing up and playing the role of Polkaroo). In the late-1970s, then-producer Coneybeare led negotiations to dissolve TVOntario's licensing agreement with Play School, freeing Polka Dot Door to be distinctively Canadian and adapt to include more Canadian educational content.

Robb and Patterson co-composed the theme song that accompanied the opening/closing animation used for the series' entire run, and wrote many of the early scripts and songs used in the series, including "Imagine, Imagine", a song often used on Imagination Day with Polkaroo. Robb would go on to be the first-ever head of children's programming at CBC Television, and would have Muppet "Dodi" in Sesame Park, a Canadian adaptation of Sesame Street, named in her honour.

The theme song was performed by Angela Antonelli, born December 29, 1933, in Guelph, Ontario. Antonelli left home at the age of 16 to study voice under Dr. Ernesto Vinci at Royal Conservatory of Music. She joined the Canadian Opera Company and Starred in Gianni Schicchi opposite Jon Vickers, Gretel in Hansel & Gretel & Marriage of Figaro among others. She was a regular on the Juliet Show for 6 seasons as well as many other radio and television shows. Antonelli was also an original cast member of Anne of Green Gables at the Charlottetown Festival; she went on to perform in many other theatrical shows.

== Producers, musicians and hosts ==
During the course of the series' run, Polka Dot Door had three producers who significantly contributed to the development of the show: original producer-director Peggy Liptrott (1971), L. Ted Coneybeare (1972–1984), and Jed MacKay (1985–1993). MacKay began as a writer and composer for Polka Dot Door in the 1970s. He went on to create and produce two multi-award-winning series for TVOntario, Join In! and Polka Dot Shorts. The accompanying background music throughout the show was played "live to tape" by Canadian pianists Herbie Helbig (1971–1984) and John Arpin (1985–1993).

Each episode of Polka Dot Door had two human hosts, always one man and one woman. There were more than fifty hosts over the course of the series. Each pair of hosts was contracted for one week's worth of episodes, with many hosts and pairs reprising their role over multiple weeks, though not necessarily with the same co-host. Most hosts during MacKay's time as producer were contracted for two to three weeks worth of episodes (10–15), with the exception of Carrie Loring, Johnnie Chase, and Cindy Cook, who hosted every year MacKay produced (1985–1993) as well as the two one-hour specials. Typically 25–35 episodes were produced each summer during the course of the series, depending on the available funds in TVOntario's programming budget. Many aspiring Canadian actors and actresses got their start on Polka Dot Door, and went on to do notable work in North American television, film, and theatre.

Below is an incomplete list of some of the people who hosted Polka Dot Door. The name in brackets is the producer whom the host worked with followed by the years in which the host hosted (when known):

- Jim Anderson (Coneybeare)
- Pixie Bigalow (Coneybeare)
- Greg Bond (MacKay)
- Catherine Bruhier (MacKay), 1992–93
- Johnie Chase (Coneybeare, MacKay), 1984–93
- Heather Cherron (MacKay)
- Jim Codrington (MacKay), 1990–93
- Heather Conkie (Coneybeare)
- Cindy Cook (Coneybeare, MacKay), 1981–93
- Louise Cranfield (MacKay)
- Diane Dewey (Coneybeare)
- Liz Dufresne (MacKay), 1991
- Sharry Flett (Coneybeare), 1980–81
- Paula Gallivan (MacKay)
- Michael Goarley (Coneybeare)
- Ken John Grant (Coneybeare), 1978
- Nonnie Griffin (Coneybeare), 1974–80
- Bonnie Gruen (Coneybeare)
- Rex Hagon (Coneybeare), 1976–78
- Patricia Hamilton (Coneybeare)
- Michael James (Coneybeare)
- Taborah Johnson (Coneybeare)
- Lynda Kemp (Coneybeare), 1977–78
- Nina Keogh (Liptrott, Coneybeare), 1971–72
- Alex Laurier (Liptrott, Coneybeare), 1971–81
- Robert Lee (MacKay), 1987–92
- Sharon Lewis (Coneybeare)
- Carrie Loring (MacKay) 1985–93
- Jane Luk (MacKay), 1992–93
- Thea McNeal (MacKay)
- Malika Mendez (Coneybeare)
- Gerry Mendicino (Coneybeare), 1979–84
- Sherry Miller (Coneybeare)
- Garth Mosbaugh (MacKay), 1991–93
- Candace O'Conner (Coneybeare)
- John Ralston (MacKay)
- Gloria Reuben (MacKay), 1985
- Christopher Trace
- Carolann Reynolds (Coneybeare), 1977–85
- Gairey Richardson (Coneybeare)
- Tom Rickert (Coneybeare) 1984
- Denis Simpson (Coneybeare), 1978-mid 80s
- Shelly Sommers (Coneybeare), 1978
- Eva St. John (MacKay)
- Gordon Thomson (Liptrott), 1971
- Peter Van Wart (Coneybeare), 1980
- Mishu Vellani (MacKay), 1989–90
- Nerene Virgin (Coneybeare), 1981
- Jonathan Whittaker (MacKay)
- Tonya Williams (Coneybeare), 1980–83
- Anne Thompson

In addition, many hosts worked on other educational shows produced by TVOntario, including Heather Conkie (Dear Aunt Agnes, Report Canada, Music Box, It's Mainly Music), Nerene Virgin (Today's Special), Nina Keogh (Readalong, Today's Special, Bookmice, The Magic Library) Rex Hagon (The Science Alliance), and Alex Laurier (Cucumber). Cindy Cook was the longest serving female host appearing on Polka Dot Door between 1981 and 1993, making her one of the most recognizable hosts from the series. She is also the only host to have worked with two producers of the show, first with Coneybeare (from 1981 to 1984) and then with MacKay (from 1985 to 1993).

== Format ==
Polka Dot Door was taped and broadcast in blocks of five episodes a week that would feature the same two hosts each day. Each five-day week had a specific theme and emphasis. However, within that theme, each day of the week had its own theme that was consistent throughout the entire series:

- Monday was "Treasure Day"
- Tuesday was "Dress-Up Day"
- Wednesday was "Animal Day"
- Thursday was "Imagination Day"
- Friday was "Finding-Out Day"

In order to create trust and familiar routines with young children, Polka Dot Door was scripted with specific 'events' that were particular to each day of the week:

- Treasure Day: Hosts would retrieve the stuffed animal toys from a toy box (in the shape of a polka dot house) while singing a specific 'hello' song. In addition, they would often discover an unexpected 'treasure' (usually found materials or a toy) from the purple (later blue) treasure box that sat nearby the story time rocking chair.
- Dress-Up Day: Hosts would open the Polka Dot Door closet to reveal dress-up clothes, pretending to be the people they were dressing up as. They would often have a 'reason' to dress-up themselves, the toys or the set.
- Animal Day: Hosts would go outside to the barn where activity with the Polka Dot Door pets or "guest pets" would take place. There were five regular Polka Dot Door pets represented on the show throughout the series. Although the specific pets changed, they retained the same names for the entire series.
- Imagination Day: Hosts would place an emphasis on fantasy, encouraging viewers to use their imagination. This was the only day in which Polkaroo appeared, almost always being played by one of the hosts.
- Finding-Out Day: Hosts would facilitate specific scientific discoveries on this day or reexamine themes from previous days of the week from a different standpoint. Every Finding-Out day would conclude with the hosts returning the toys back to their toy box while singing a specific "goodbye" song. The final camera shot seen before the final credits would be the hosts exiting through the large polka dot door.

Another regular event on Polka Dot Door was Storytime, which featured in each programme. This involved the host teaching and telling the time on a large, oversized blue (later pink) grandfather clock and featured the appearance of a small stuffed animal named "Storytime Mouse". Often Storytime Mouse would be engaged in some activity related to that day's story.

Although Storytime happened in every episode, it was often at different, unpredictable times. Whatever activity was happening on the show would be interrupted by a sequence of chimes indicating that it was time to tell the time together and hear a story. The hosts would stop whatever activity they were doing and go to the grandfather clock to tell the time and then read a story in an adjacent rocking chair specifically used for this purpose on the show. Helbig and Arpin would provide instrumental piano accompaniment, often accenting the moods and themes represented in the story being told.

Depending on the emphasis, there would be a "song of the week" that would often be reprised every day, helping viewers to solidify the emphasis of that week's theme. Many of the songs in the early years of the program were composed by the script writers themselves. When MacKay, an accomplished composer, took over as producer from 1985 to 1993, he composed many of the songs used in the series during that time.

== Characters and toys ==
The hosts would lead young children in songs and stories, and interact with stuffed toys Humpty, Dumpty, Marigold, and Bear. These characters did not speak or move; the hosts would let the audience know what they were saying; for example, one of the hosts would say "What's that Marigold? You would like..." In the 1980s, a stuffed cat named Minou was added, which introduced viewers to simple words and phrases in French. On certain theme days the hosts would invite the audience to peer through the Polka Dot Door to witness an educational video of some sort, showing, for instance, how crayons are made.

== Legacy and awards ==
In 2010, the Academy of Canadian Cinema and Television gave Polka Dot Door a Masterworks award, calling it a "groundbreaking children's educational series" that "changed the nature of children's television programming" and "impacted countless young Canadians and raised the international profile of the Canadian television industry."

== One-hour specials ==
Only two one-hour specials have aired in the history of Polka Dot Door; these shows consist of five hosts (two male, three female) and the Polkaroo portrayed by unknown host.

- Polkaroo's Birthday Party – This was used to commemorate the 20th anniversary of the Polka Dot Door, as well as cameos from other hosts in the past.
- Polkaroo Goes To Camp – This was used to commemorate the finale of the series; this is also the only show in the history of Polka Dot Door not to have storytime.

== Polkaroo ==
Each day's episode had a particular theme. Monday was "Treasure Day", Tuesday was "Dress-Up Day", Wednesday was "Animal Day", Thursday was "Imagination Day", and Friday was "Finding Out Day". On "Imagination Day", the character Polkaroo (sometimes referred to as "the Polkaroo") appeared. The actor playing Polkaroo donned a tall, green plush costume that resembled a kangaroo. In its mended, yellow and multi-coloured polka-dot muumuu, the creature spoke using various repeated exclamations of its own name accompanied by elaborate gestures. The meaning of this pantomime was to be guessed by the audience. This was usually followed by a song whose lyrics began "Imagine, imagine, you can imagine Polkaroo...". In the first two seasons, Polkaroo would appear to one of the hosts while the other host was absent for some reason. The co-host would return upon Polkaroo's departure, habitually exclaiming, "The Polkaroo was here?!? And I missed him again?!?" Both hosts took turns as the Polkaroo. Starting in the third season, only the male host donned the Polkaroo costume.

In the mid-1990s, TVOntario capitalized on the success of Polkaroo by placing him and the stuffed toy characters, now also actors dressed in costumes, in a new series, Polka Dot Shorts, which also had its own catchphrase moment, as each episode included the unlikely discovery of a pair of polka dot shorts, leading to the exchange:

(Character): A great big pair of polka dot shorts! How did they get there? Polkaroo:I haven't the foggiest!

Following the end of Polka Dot Shorts, Polkaroo also appeared in the children's series Gisèle's Big Backyard.

The Polkaroo costume as seen above and on the original series was handmade in Toronto by Tanya Petrova, an immigrant artist from Toronto who made brief appearances on numerous television shows from Mr. Dressup to The Steve Allen Show in the late 1960s to early 1970s. Petrova also created 24 puppets, including Charlie Horse and Lionel for Shari Lewis, as well as costumes for Ontario Place theme park, Eaton's (for example, Glump) and other events and attractions.

There were several other versions of the Polkaroo costume as well: the one with the long slender neck was built by Lorraine Cramp in 1982. She also made the Moose and Beaver costumes for Cucumber, the Sidney the Kangaroo costume for Math Patrol, and the Subterranean Monster costume for Mathmakers.

== Parodies ==
The 1980s Canadian sketch-comedy show Smith & Smith, starring real-life husband and wife team Steve and Morag Smith, used to parody the Polka Dot Door with a recurring sketch called "The Kids Show", with male and female hosts who loathed each other and bickered their way through the sketch. The sketches also featured the "Jerkaroo", played by Steve Smith with a paper bag over his head.

In 2018, a rally in Toronto's Trinity Bellwoods Park to celebrate the legalization of cannabis in Canada saw the appearance of "Tokaroo", a marijuana-smoking parody of Polkaroo. Tokaroo was created by Mark Scott, an actor who had once been directly employed by TVOntario to play Polkaroo in live promotional appearances, and the network threatened him with legal action. Scott also has a longer history of creating Polkaroo variants in his contemporary work as a children's educator, including Rainbowroo to discuss LGBTQ issues, Signaroo to educate children about hearing impairment and sign language, and Readyroo to educate children about disability and special needs.

== Images ==
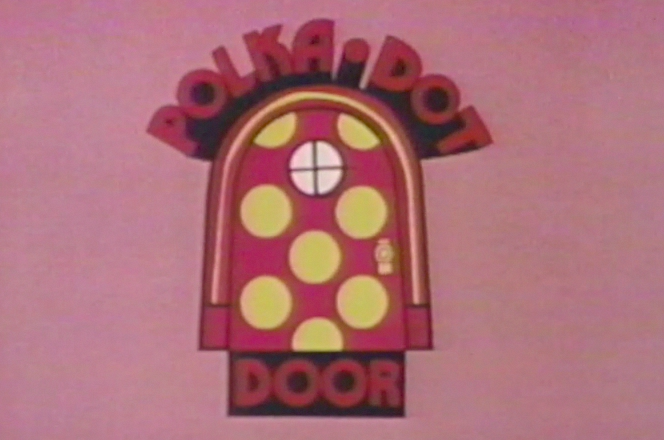
The Polka Dot Door logo created by Dick Derhodge in 1971.

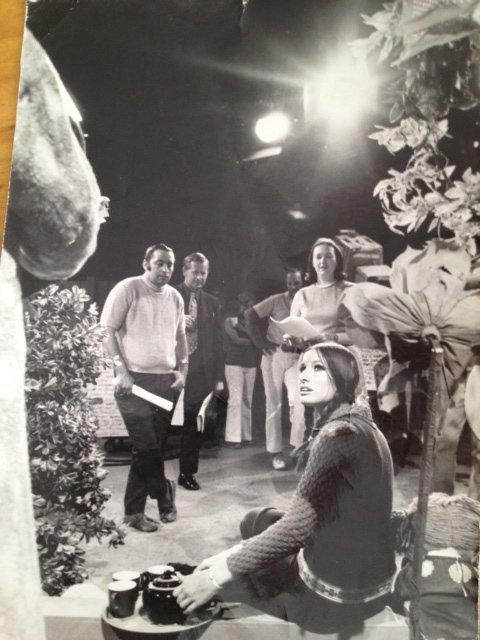
Polka Dot Door's first female host Nina Keogh with original producer Peggy Liptrott (right), floor director Al O'Malley (front left) and educational consultant L. Ted Coneybeare (left with tie) in background (1971).

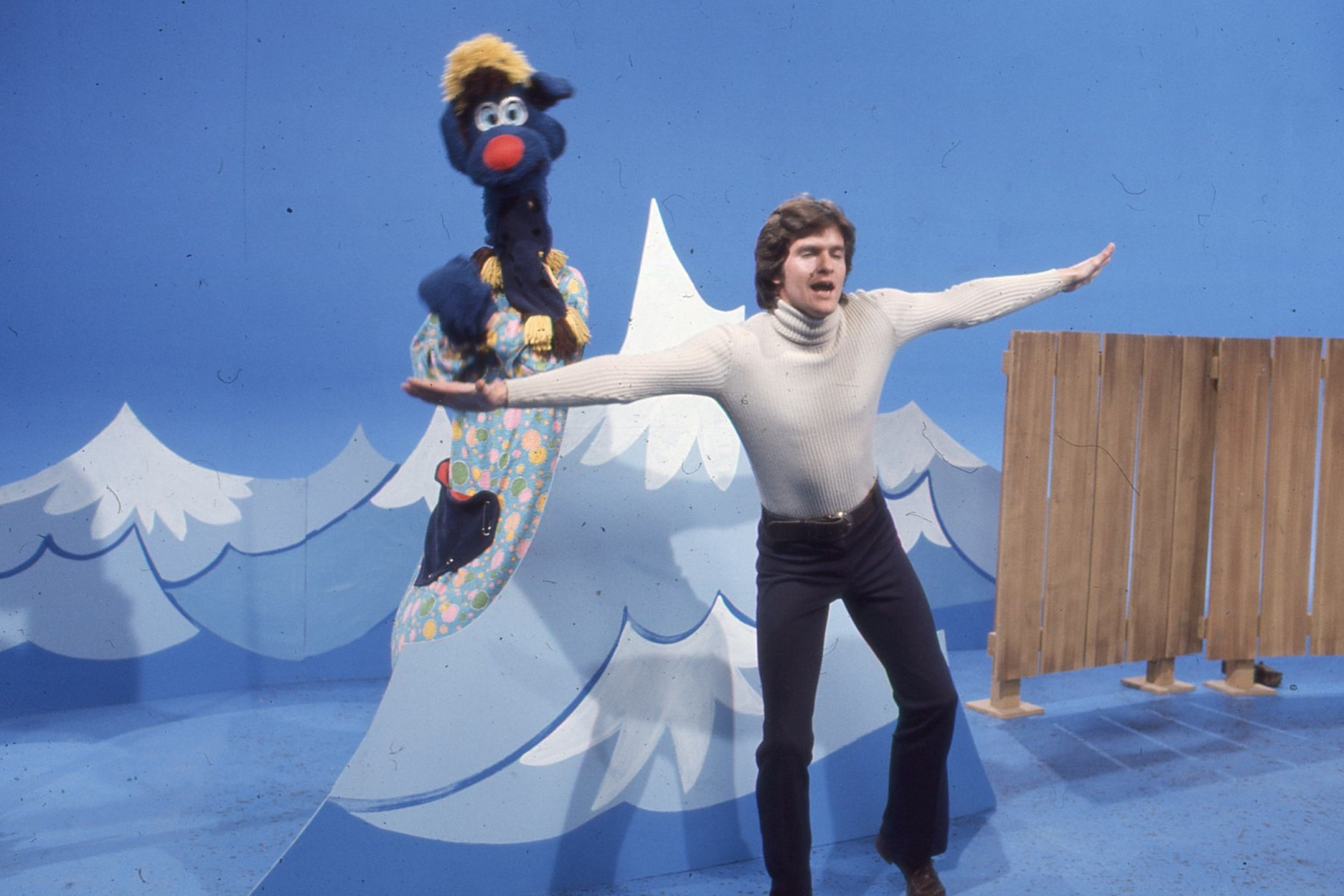
Polka Dot Door's first male host Gordon Thomson with Polkaroo played by Nina Keogh (1971).
