= Cowardy Custard =

Musical revue

Cowardy Custard book and album with the same image of Coward. The programme has the Mermaid Theatre's standard cover.

Cowardy Custard is a musical revue and was one of the last Noël Coward shows staged during his life. It was devised by Gerald Frow, Alan Strachan and Wendy Toye. A book, also titled Cowardy Custard, was published in connection with the revue, similarly celebrating the Coward image.

The biographical revue premiered in London in 1972, running for 405 performances. A revised version toured in the UK in 2011.

The term "cowardy custard" is a taunt used by children in the UK equivalent to "scaredy cat" in the US.

== History ==
The working title of the show was Cream of Coward, but Coward cabled the producers three months before the opening from his home in Jamaica suggesting Cowardy Custard. He vetoed an alternative suggestion, This Is Noël Coward, which he said was too close to "This Was Noël Coward".

Telling the story of Coward's life through song and biographical snippets, the revue was billed as "An entertainment featuring the words and music of Noël Coward". The Coward numbers featured are songs and scenes from Coward's works of the 1920s to the 1960s, including "You were there", "Mad About the Boy"; "The Stately Homes of England", "I Wonder What Happened to Him?" and, perhaps most memorably, "Marvellous Party" (sung by Patricia Routledge in the original production). The revue also contains previously unpublished material, excerpts of plays and dialogues, material from Coward's autobiographies and some of his poems. Sketches featured include scenes from Shadow Play.

The original production opened at the Mermaid Theatre, London, on 10 July 1972 as part of the 1972 City of London Festival and ran for over a year for a total of 405 performances. It was directed by Wendy Toye and employed a cast of twelve (six men and six women), featuring Routledge, Derek Waring, John Moffatt, Elaine Delmar, Una Stubbs, Jonathan Cecil, Peter Gale, Anna Sharkey, Geoffrey Burridge, Laurel Ford, Tudor Davies and Olivia Breeze. The musical director was John Burrows. After its run in London, the show toured the UK with different cast members. It has since been produced by amateur groups. Also in 1972, a revue on similar lines, Oh, Coward!, played in New York at the New Theatre, achieving 294 performances.

A recording of the original London production of Cowardy Custard was made by RCA. The production also spawned a book called Cowardy Custard: The World of Noël Coward.

A new version of the show, revised by Strachan, was toured in the UK in spring 2011, starring Dillie Keane and Kit and the Widow, with Stuart Neal and Savannah Stevenson. It included unpublished material and excerpts from Coward's diaries and memoirs, as well as the songs and scenes. Charles Spencer in The Daily Telegraph wrote, "This loving tribute to Noël Coward … now revised for a smaller cast ... is a classy delight … from Dillie Keane's hilariously hooting, rubber-legged drunk-act during 'I've Been to a Marvellous Party' ... to Kit Hesketh-Harvey's amazing hip-swivelling during the Latin American number 'Nina'."

== Musical numbers ==
From Mermaid Theatre programme, 10 July 1972 and sleeve notes to cast recording, RCA SER 5656/57. Numbers marked * were retained in the 2011 revival (with additional numbers listed below)

- Opening medley
  - If Love Were All*
  - I'll See You Again
  - Time and Again
  - Has Anybody Seen Our Ship?
  - Try To Learn To Love
  - Kiss Me
  - Go Slow, Johnny
  - Tokay
  - Dearest Love
  - Could You Please Oblige Us With a Bren Gun?
  - Come the Wild, Wild Weather
  - Spinning Song
  - Parisian Pierrot
- Play, Orchestra, Play*
- You Were There*
- Any Little Fish*
- A Room With a View*
- When You Want Me*
- Specially for You
- Beatnik Love Affair
- I'm Mad About You
- Poor Little Rich Girl*
- Louisa*
- Mad About the Boy*
- The Stately Homes of England*
- Twentieth Century Blues*
- I've Been to a Marvellous Party*
- Mrs Worthington*
- Why Must the Show Go On?*
- London sequence
  - London Pride*
  - London is a Little Bit of All Right
  - What Ho, Mrs Brisket
  - Don't Take our Charlie for the Army
  - Saturday Night at the Rose and Crown
  - London at Night
- There Are Bad Times Just Around the Corner*
- Alice is at it Again*
- The Passenger's Always Right
- Useless Useful Phrases*
- Why Do the Wrong People Travel?*
- Mad Dogs and Englishmen*
- Nina*
- I Like America
- Bronxville Darby and Joan*
- I Wonder What Happened to Him*
- Miss Mouse
- Let's Do It (music by Cole Porter; lyrics rewritten by Coward "with some additional topical lines")
- Closing medley
  - Touring Days*
  - Nothing Can Last Forever*
  - Would You Like to Stick a Pin in my Balloon?
  - Mary Make-Believe
  - Dance, Little Lady
  - Man About Town
  - Forbidden Fruit
  - Sigh No More
  - There's a Younger Generation
  - I'll Follow My Secret Heart
  - If Love Were All

=== 2011 version ===
In addition to the numbers marked with an asterisk above, the 2011 revival of the show featured:

- Together with Music
- Someday I'll Find You
- In a Boat on a Lake
- The Coconut Girl
- I Travel Alone
- Never Again
