= Twentieth-Century Blues: The Songs of Noël Coward =

Twentieth Century Blues: The Songs of Noël Coward

Compilation album (tribute album) by various artists
- Released: 13 April 1998
- Length: 59:22
- Label: EMI Records
- Producer: Neil Tennant; Tris Penna

Singles from Twentieth Century Blues
- 1. "Someday I'll Find You" / "I've Been to a Marvellous Party" Released: 30 March 1998

Twentieth Century Blues: The Songs of Noël Coward is a 1998 Noël Coward tribute album curated by Neil Tennant. Prominent artists of the day were invited to reinterpret Coward's songs for the late 20th century to commemorate the centenary of his birth. Profits from the album's sale were donated to the Red Hot AIDS Charitable Trust.

The album yielded the double A-sided single "Someday I'll Find You" / "I've Been to a Marvellous Party", which reached number 28 in the UK Singles Chart. The album itself peaked at number 14 on the UK Compilation Albums chart.

== Background and compilation ==
The project was conceived by Simon Watney, the director of the Red Hot AIDS Charitable Trust, which has released a number of charity albums benefiting HIV/AIDS relief and research. Watney secured the cooperation of the Coward estate, and executive producers Neil Tennant and Tris Penna worked on the album for 12 months with a firm deadline of an Easter 1998 release. At Tennant's recommendation, only British performers were included in recognition of Coward's important role in British songwriting. The concept was to feature contemporary performances that remained faithful to Coward's spirit. Tennant said, "I didn't want this album to be reverential, I wanted to see if the songs would work nowadays ... We looked at artists who had some sense of theatre, wit, style, humour, even music hall".

Some alterations occurred during the recording of the album. Black Grape were originally meant to record "Mad Dogs and Englishmen", but the band withdrew due to a conflict between members; Space recorded the song instead. In addition, the final song recorded, Damon Albarn and Michael Nyman's version of "London Pride", was nearly rejected due to being, reportedly, almost unrecognisable in its original version. Tennant ordered the song to be kept, though Albarn had already agreed to make changes by that time. Vic Reeves recorded Coward's uncensored version of "Don't Put Your Daughter on the Stage, Mrs. Worthington", but the last verse was cut from the album because it includes foul language.

== Release ==
Prior to the album's release, the artists performed their numbers at a concert on 15 January 1998 at the Park Lane Hotel. The songs were introduced by actors, including Ned Sherrin, Nigel Hawthorne, and Imogen Stubbs, quoting selections from Coward's works. The concert was broadcast on BBC Radio 2 on 4 April 1998 and was televised on BBC Two on 11 April 1998 during Easter weekend. The concert film was directed by Chips Chipperfield.

Twentieth Century Blues was released on 13 April 1998 by EMI Records. It was preceded on 30 March by a single with "Someday I'll Find You" performed by Shola Ama and "I've Been to a Marvellous Party" by The Divine Comedy. Suede were asked to release their version of "Poor Little Rich Girl" as the lead single but declined in order to focus on preparing their next album, Head Music.

In the United States, the album was distributed the following year by Ichiban Records via Platinum Entertainment, with a release date of 16 November 1999.

The album is out of print and was not made available on iTunes due to issues securing the digital release rights for each of the artists.

A DVD with selections from the concert film was released by Eagle Rock Entertainment and Image Entertainment in March 1999. It features an additional song not on the album, "If Love Were All" performed by Pet Shop Boys.

== Critical reception ==
Music journalist Stephen Dalton commented: "The old guard (Bryan Ferry, Paul McCartney, Sting) perform suavely spot-on Coward impressions while the youngsters (Suede, Damon Albarn, the Divine Comedy) play havoc with his acid wit and elastic arrangements ... Check out Neil Hannon's 'Born Slippy'-on-steroids mauling of 'I Went To A Marvellous Party' or Robbie Williams leaving hobnailed boot-prints all over 'Bad Times Are Just Around The Corner'". He added, "Vic's version of 'Don't Put Your Daughter On The Stage, Mrs Worthington', a spoken trip-hop rumble arranged by David Arnold, is one of the album's peaks. It highlights the original's seethingly nasty underside without once playing it for laughs".

Writing for The Advocate, Barry Walters observed: "Nearly every one of the 14 tracks applies a different strategy to these standards ... As with most multiartist affairs, Twentieth Century Blues: The Songs of Noel Coward misfires occasionally, but the delights far outnumber the duds". He also noted: "Neil Tennant of the Pet Shop Boys is perhaps Coward's closest pop peer, and so it makes perfect sense that he'd be behind an album ... that presents the composer quite convincingly as the archetypal English pop icon, the forerunner of the Beatles, David Bowie, and the Pets themselves".

Michael Paoletta of Billboard called the album "delectable" and "lovingly compiled". He concluded: "For sheer beauty, look no further than Shola Ama (accompanied by Craig Armstrong) doing "Someday I'll Find You," which is awash in blissful orchestral maneuvers, lush atmospherics, and Ama's heartfelt delivery".

In a review of the DVD, Rad Bennett of Audio magazine wrote: "The songs are really a lot more successful than one might think from the setlist. Marianne Faithfull, sounding more and more like Lotte Lenya, croons "Mad About the Boy"; Divine Comedy, successfully shifting back and forth between English music hall and heavy rock traditions, nails "Marvelous Party." Sting, accompanied only by harp, does an effectively bittersweet version of "I'll Follow My Secret Heart," and there's a genuinely moving version of "If Love Were All" from The Pet Shop Boys".

Steve Redmond of Music Week described the BBC broadcast of the concert: "The live show was undoubtedly one of the TV highlights of a rainy Easter weekend. Time and again it demonstrated the strength of Coward's material, and its ability to cope with new interpretations. The performances of Shola Ama and The Divine Comedy, in particular, showed two of the great talents of contemporary British music in perfect harmony with one of our greatest popular songwriters".

== Track listing ==
No.	Title	Artist(s)	Length
1.	"Introduction"	Neil Tennant	1:07
2.	"Parisian Pierrot"	Texas	3:39
3.	"I've Been to a Marvellous Party"	The Divine Comedy	3:39
4.	"A Room With a View"	Paul McCartney	2:07
5.	"Sail Away"	Pet Shop Boys	4:31
6.	"Someday I'll Find You"	Shola Ama and Craig Armstrong	3:39
7.	"There Are Bad Times Just Around the Corner"	Robbie Williams	4:36
8.	"I'll See You Again"	Bryan Ferry	2:40
9.	"Mad About the Boy"	Marianne Faithfull	5:18
10.	"Mad Dogs and Englishmen"	Space	3:10
11.	"Poor Little Rich Girl"	Suede featuring Raissa Khan-Panni	7:12
12.	"I'll Follow My Secret Heart"	Sting	2:33
13.	"London Pride"	Damon Albarn with Michael Nyman	4:42
14.	"Don't Put Your Daughter on the Stage, Mrs. Worthington"	Vic Reeves	4:57
15.	"Twentieth Century Blues"	Elton John	5:32

=== DVD ===
DVD track listing
Title	Artist(s)
"Introduction"	Ned Sherrin
"Twentieth Century Blues"	Elton John
"Poor Little Rich Girl"	Suede featuring Raissa
"Mad About The Boy"	Marianne Faithfull
"Marvellous Party"	Divine Comedy
"Someday I'll Find You"	Shola Ama
"Sail Away"	Pet Shop Boys
"If Love Were All"	Pet Shop Boys
"I'll Follow My Secret Heart"	Sting
"There Are Bad Times Just Around The Corner"	Robbie Williams

== Release history ==
Release dates and formats for "Before"
Region	Date	Format(s)	Label(s)	Ref.
United Kingdom	13 April 1998	CD; cassette	EMI Records	
United States	16 November 1999	CD	Ichiban Records; Platinum Entertainment	

== Chart performance ==
Chart performance for Twentieth Century Blues
Chart (1998)	Peak position
UK Compilation Albums (Official Charts)	14
