= The Tenth Decade =

1971 Canadian documentary TV series

- Genre: Documentary
- Written by: Brian Nolan; Ed Reid; Christopher Young
- Directed by: Munroe Scott
- Narrated by: Jon Granik
- Composer: Larry Crosley
- Country of origin: Canada
- Original language: English
- No. of seasons: 1
- No. of episodes: 8

Production
- Executive producer: Cameron Graham

Original release
- Network: CBC Television
- Release: 27 October – 22 December 1971

The Tenth Decade is a Canadian documentary television miniseries that aired on CBC Television in 1971.

== Premise ==
The series presented Canada's political history between 1957 and 1967, or the tenth decade since the nation's Confederation. John Diefenbaker of the Progressive Conservative party became prime minister in the 1957 election. He was defeated by Lester B. Pearson and his Liberal party in 1963. The series concentrated on the lives and careers of both Diefenbaker and Pearson, supported by interview and archival footage.

The music score was composed by Larry Crosley and performed by several orchestras which were not credited in the series, including the Toronto Symphony Orchestra.

== Scheduling ==
This hour-long series was broadcast on Wednesdays at 9:00 p.m. from 27 October to 22 December 1971. It was rebroadcast on CBC Television at various times in 1972 and 1976.

== Episodes ==
No.	Title	Original release date
1	"Prologue to Power"	27 October 1971
Biographical profiles of Diefenbaker and Pearson and documented Diefenbaker's 1957 victory.
2	"From Victory to Triumph"	3 November 1971
Set during Diefenbaker's initial minority government towards his majority victory in the March 1958 election. Pearson then succeeded Louis St. Laurent as opposition Liberal leader.
3	"The Power and The Glory"	10 November 1971
Featured Diefenbaker's majority term until the 1962 election when his Progressive Conservatives were scaled back to a minority government.
4	"Treason and Transition"	24 November 1971
Concerns Diefenbaker's final government term in which Canada supported the Bomarc missile program but rejected nuclear weaponry. This was a key issue in the 1963 election in which Pearson and his Liberals won.
5	"Search for a Mandate"	1 December 1971
Described Pearson's early years as Prime Minister of another minority government. This era until the 1965 election was marked by controversies of national scandals, the federal budget and the Vietnam War.
6	"No Joy in Heaven"	8 December 1971
Featured Pearson's second term of government. Controversies during this time included situations in Quebec and revelations of the Gerda Munsinger scandal.
7	"Celebration and Succession"	15 December 1971
Set in 1967, the Canadian Centennial year, during which Diefenbaker resigned as opposition leader.
8	"The End of an Era"	22 December 1971
Featured Pearson's final term as Prime Minister after which his successor, Pierre Trudeau, won a majority term in 1968 over Robert Stanfield who now led the Progressive Conservatives.

No episode was broadcast on 17 November 1971 due to a Canadian Football League game.

== See also ==
Graham later produced separate miniseries on prime ministers Diefenbaker and Pearson:

- First Person Singular: Pearson – The Memoirs of a Prime Minister (1973)
- One Canadian: The Political Memoirs of the Rt. Hon. John G. Diefenbaker (1976–77)
