= David Joseph (basketball) =

Canadian basketball coach

David Joseph is a Canadian basketball coach. He most recently served as an assistant coach at Centennial College. A former college player, Joseph was named Canadian College Player of the Year and won a CCAA national championship in 1982, playing for the Southern Alberta Institute of Technology. He has nearly 30 years of coaching experience at the high school, college, and professional levels.

== Early life and education ==
Born in Trinidad and Tobago, Joseph moved to Canada in the 1970s, at age 12, settling in Scarborough, Ontario. Originally a soccer player, he was introduced to basketball by a neighbourhood friend. He attended Danforth Collegiate and Technical Institute and later Jarvis Collegiate Institute in Toronto for high school, where he became a star in his new sport for the Bulldogs, who began dominating the Toronto high school league in 1978. Despite standing just under 6 ft 0 in, he was known for his dunking ability, earning a reputation as a very athletic guard. Toronto Raptors broadcaster Paul Jones faced Joseph in high school, describing him as "a smart player, a good defensive player, a scorer," also stating "As good as Cory and Devoe are, I'm not sure they could have beaten their dad [in high school]."

Joseph attended the Southern Alberta Institute of Technology, where he led the Trojans to the 1981–82 CCAA national championship, for which he was named MVP and Canadian College Player of the Year. He graduated with a degree in civil engineering. He also played at Mount Royal College, where he met his future wife, Connie, who played on the women's basketball team. Joseph played in the George Brown College summer league, which featured many overseas Canadian professional players, Canadian national team players, and Americans who were seeking competition. He once scored 50 points in a college game.

Deciding to pursue a coaching career, he earned a degree in sports management at the University of Guelph. As a member of the Guelph Gryphons, he was named a 1984–85 OUA West First Team All-Star.

== Coaching career ==
From 1987–1989, Joseph was the head coach at Centennial College, leading the Colts to an OCAA silver medal in 1988. From 1991–1999, he coached at Eastern Commerce Collegiate Institute, where the Saints won eight Toronto city championships and back-to-back Ontario provincial championships in 1995 and 1996. Joseph also coached at his former high school, Jarvis Collegiate Institute. From 2003–2008, he was an assistant coach at Pickering High School, where the Trojans won five league championships and back-to-back Ontario provincial championships in 2007 and 2008.

Joseph made his professional coaching debut in 2011, when he was named head coach of the Oshawa Power of the National Basketball League of Canada. He couldn't take the job full-time because of his other job as an assistant coach at Centennial College, therefore, he only coached two games. He stayed with the team as an assistant and player development coach. Joseph was again named head coach during the 2013–14 season, after the team relocated to Mississauga. Despite finishing in last place, the team won a wild card game and advanced to the playoffs. Following the season, Joseph was succeeded by Kyle Julius as head coach. He continued coaching at Centennial College until the end of the 2015–16 season.

He also coaches youth at summer basketball camps in the Greater Toronto Area.

== Personal life ==
Joseph married Connie and the family settled in Pickering, Ontario; the couple are now separated. They have four children: Chantal, Danielle, Devoe, and Cory. Their youngest child, Cory, currently plays in the NBA for the Orlando Magic. Devoe plays professionally in Europe. Joseph coached his sons when they played together at Pickering High School.
