= Oh, Coward! =

Musical revue by Roderick Cook and Noël Coward

Oh, Coward! is a musical revue in two acts devised by Roderick Cook and containing music and lyrics by Noël Coward. The revue consists of two men and one woman in formal dress, performing songs based on the following themes: England, family album, travel, theatre, love and women. There are also sketches, such as "London Pastoral" which tells of the joys of London in the spring, "Family Album" about relatives who "were not excessively bright", and a scene with excerpts from several of Coward's plays, such as Private Lives.

It ran Off-Broadway in 1972, in London in 1975 and on Broadway in 1986. Also in 1972 a revue along similar lines, Cowardy Custard played in London.

== Productions ==
A Coward revue at the 1968 Vancouver International Festival called And Now Noël Coward…: An Agreeable Impertinence, was created and directed by Roderick Cook and starred Dorothy Loudon. It received scathing reviews from the critics. It was soon revised and presented on Broadway, with mostly the same cast, as Noël Coward's Sweet Potato. Though it received slightly better notices, it lasted only 44 performances. Cook again reshaped the material, as Oh, Coward!, premiering the work in Toronto in 1970, then touring it to Boston and Chicago. The Toronto production had a cast led by Cook, Tom Kneebone and Dinah Christie, with Herbie Helbig serving as music director. Helbig wrote new arrangements for this version.

Oh, Coward! opened Off-Broadway with a new cast on 4 October 1972 and was one of the last Noël Coward shows staged during his life. It played for 294 performances at the New Theatre. Its cast included Barbara Cason, Jamie Ross and Cook, who also directed the revue. A London production opened on 5 June 1975 at the Criterion Theatre, starring Cook, Ross and Geraldine McEwan, and ran until 2 August 1975. The show later played on Broadway beginning on 17 November 1986 at the Helen Hayes Theatre, where it ran for 56 performances. Again directed by and starring Cook, the cast also featured Catherine Cox and Patrick Quinn. The production was nominated for two Tony Awards, Best Actor and Actress in a Musical, for Cook and Cox.

Of the London production, Michael Billington of The Guardian wrote, "the star performer is undeniably Mr Cook himself... with a dangerous tooth-baring smile... he delivers each syllable of each song with a clinical, omniscient precision. Geraldine McEwan, willowy and acidulous in white satin, likewise realises that merciless articulation is the key to Coward performing, and Jamie Ross amiably makes up the trio in the manner of someone completing a country house party." The New York Times review of the 1986 production noted, "The performance is determinedly low-key and genteel, in keeping with its source. Neither in the selection of material nor in the performances does the show overstep into self-parody, as is often the case in other musical anthologies. As before, Mr. Cook lets Coward speak and sing for himself, which he does, trippingly."

A review of the original cast recording compared it with the contemporary London show, Cowardy Custard: "The formula is much the same, a show made out of Noël Coward's writing and composing. Where it differs is that Cowardy Custard was a carefully co-ordinated revue, this is more of a cabaret entertainment, the songs being delivered by the three performers without, as far as one can judge from the recording, any attempt at staging, accompanied by two pianos, bass, drums and percussion... the Coward enthusiast will note the first recording ever of his early trio 'Bright Young People'."

== Songs ==
Note: Partial list

Act 1

- Medley

- "Something To Do With Spring"
- "Bright Young People"
- "Poor Little Rich Girl"
- "Zigeuner"
- "Let's Say Goodbye"
- "This Is A Changing World"
- "We Were Dancing"
- "Dance Little Lady"
- "A Room with a View"
- "Sail Away"

- "The End of the News"
- "The Stately Homes of England"
- "London Pride"
- "Family Album"
- "The Music Hall" medley

- "Chase Me, Charlie"
- "Saturday Night at the Rose and Crown"
- "The Island of Bolamazoo"
- "What Ho! Mrs. Brisket"
- "Has Anybody Seen Our Ship?"
- "Men About Town"
- "If Love Were All"

- "Why Do The Wrong People Travel?"
- "Mrs. Worthington"

Act 2

- "Mad Dogs and Englishmen"
- "A Marvelous Party"
- "You Were There"
- "I Am No Good at Love"
- "Sex Talk"
- "A Question of Lighting"
- "Mad About the Boy"
- "Nina"
- "In A Bar on the Piccola Marina"
- "World Weary"
- Finale-Medley

- "Where Are The Songs We Sang?"
- "Someday I'll Find You"
- "If Love Were All"
- "Play, Orchestra, Play"

== Awards and nominations ==
=== Original West End production ===
Year	Award	Category	Nominee	Result
1976	Laurence Olivier Award	Best Comedy Performance	Geraldine McEwan	Nominated
1976	Laurence Olivier Award	Best Costume Design	David Toser	Nominated

=== Original Broadway production ===
Year	Award	Category	Nominee	Result
1987	Tony Award	Best Actor in a Musical	Roderick Cook	Nominated
1987	Tony Award	Best Actress in a Musical	Catherine Cox	Nominated
