= Special report (disambiguation) =

A special report is frequently a type of news broadcast.

Special Report or variant, may also refer to:

- Special Report (TV program), a U.S. political editorial commentary TV show on Fox News Channel
- Dr. Dobb's Special Report, a magazine
- "Gerry Ford (A Special Report)" (song), a.k.a. "A Special Report", a 1974 song by Dickie Goodman
- "Special Report: Live From the Forest of Death" (episode), a 2003 season 1 episode 26 of Naruto!

== See also ==
- Special 301 Report, an annual report by the Office of the United States Trade Representative
- news broadcasting
- breaking news
- news report
- Special (disambiguation)
- Report (disambiguation)
