= Alex Laurier =

Canadian folk singer, actor

Alex Eftimoff (born 1936 or 1937), better known by the stage name Alex Laurier, was a Canadian children's entertainer, folk singer, and actor.

In 1954, while a student at Pickering High School in Ajax, Ontario, Eftimoff appeared in the Simpson's Drama Festival, performing the role of Bartley in Riders to the Sea for which he won an award as "outstanding actor". Later, as a university student, Eftimoff appeared in student productions at the Hart House Theatre at the University of Toronto in the late 1950s.

After graduating from university, he was a high school French teacher in Ajax in the early 1960s and also worked with the Canadian Puppet Theatre on the Toronto Islands as a puppeteer and balladeer. He then attended the University of Iowa where he obtained his master's degree in French in 1966 and hosted a radio show as well as appearing in student musicals, directing and emceeing three international festivals before returning to Canada.

Assuming the stage name Alex Laurier, he was a frequent guest on the Uncle Bobby show in the 1960s and 1970s performing children's songs and playing guitar. In 1968, he released an album of children's songs, The Lollipop Tree And Other Children's Favourites. He was a host and musical performer on the CTV Television Network's variety show, River Inn, in the late 1960s and also performed as a folk singer in coffee houses and other live venues in the Toronto area. In the 1970s and early 1980s, Laurier was a co-host of two children's series produced by TVOntario, the province's education channel: Polka Dot Door and Cucumber, in which he co-starred in costume as "Moose" to Nikki Tilroe's "Beaver". He also appeared on Mr. Dressup in the early 1970s.

As an actor, Laurier appeared as a guest in a number of Canadian television series and TV movies in the 1980s and early 1990s on such series as Street Legal, Seeing Things, The Mighty Jungle, Katts and Dog and TV movies such as The Kidnapping of Baby John Doe and Gregory K, as well as the feature film Open Season.

In 1994, Laurier pleaded guilty to having sexually assaulted an eight-year-old boy in 1973 and was sentenced to one year in jail. He had earlier been convicted of four similar offences in 1974, for which he received a suspended sentence and two years' probation.
