= New Theatre (off-Broadway) =

The New Theatre was an Off-Broadway theatre in New York City that was active during the 1960s and 1970s. Co-founded by Sybil Christopher and located at 154 E 54th St, the theatre opened in 1964 with the American premiere of Ann Jellicoe's The Knack. Several notable productions premiered at the theatre including Mary Rodgers's The Mad Show (1966) and Roderick Cook's musical revue of Noël Coward songs Oh, Coward! (1972). The theatre closed in 1974.
