= I Went to a Marvellous Party =

1938 song

"I Went to a Marvellous Party" (sometimes known as "I've Been to a Marvellous Party") is a song with words and music by Noël Coward, written in 1938 and included in his Broadway revue, Set to Music, in which it was performed by Beatrice Lillie in January 1939. Lillie introduced the song to London audiences in June of that year in cabaret at the Café de Paris. It was later included in the revues All Clear (1939), Cowardy Custard (1972) and Oh, Coward! (1972). Both Lillie and Coward made recordings of the song, which is among his most popular.

== Description ==
The lyric of I Went to a Marvellous Party is a first-person description of five parties attended by the singer on the French Riviera. The character of the song is humorous and giddy. It has been suggested that the activities described in the lyrics were typical of the "frantic, addleheaded search for amusement" of the Train Bleu society, which flocked to the Riviera each summer in the 1920s and '30s.

In 1953 Coward described the background to the writing of the song:

During the summer of 1937 or 1938, I forget which, Elsa Maxwell gave a party in the South of France, It was a "Beach" party and when she invited Grace Moore, Beatrice Lillie and me she explained that we were to "come as we were" and that it would be "just ourselves". When we arrived (as we were) we discovered that "just ourselves" meant about a hundred of us, all in the last stages of evening dress.

Coward added, "This whole glittering episode was my original inspiration for 'I went to a Marvellous Party'. Beattie eventually sang the song in Set to Music wearing slacks, a fisherman's shirt, several ropes of pearls, a large sun-hat and dark glasses".

Although Coward wrote a melody for the song, the text is most often recited over a piano accompaniment. Out of Coward's approximately 300 songs, this is one of his most popular, ranking among the top 30 in royalty payments.

== Performance history ==
Coward wrote the song with Lillie in mind, and included it in his revue Set to Music which opened at the Music Box Theatre in New York on 18 January 1939. The show was a much revised version of his 1932 West End show Words and Music.

Lillie introduced the song to London audiences in June 1939 in cabaret at the Café de Paris, and later in the year it was included in the revue All Clear at the Queen's Theatre. At the midnight gala at the Phoenix Theatre on 5 December 1969, marking Coward's seventieth birthday, Danny La Rue performed the song. Both the British and American retrospective Coward revues in 1972 included the number, performed by Patricia Routledge in Cowardy Custard and Roderick Cook in Oh, Coward!. The New York Times commented on the former that Routledge "incredible as it may seem, actually tops Beatrice Lillie's memorable performance".

== Sheet music ==
The song is published separately as sheet music or in a number of collections, including the following:

- The Noël Coward Songbook, London: Michael Joseph, 1953 OCLC 936894475
- Noël Coward – Songs to Amuse, London: Chappell & Co. 1970 OCLC 834479860
- A Noël Coward Gala, Volume 1, Chappell & Co./Random House, 1972(?) ISBN 978-0-88-188168-4
- Cowardy Custard, John Hadfield, ed., London: Heinemann, 1973 ISBN 978-0-43-431090-6

== Lyrics alone ==
- The Lyrics of Noël Coward, London: Heinemann, 1965 OCLC 1245533578
- The Complete Lyrics of Noël Coward, Barry Day (ed.) London: Methuen, 1998. ISBN 0-413-73230-4

== Discography ==
=== Noël Coward ===
- 1939. Orchestra conductor, Emmet Dolan. LP AIE 2122.
- 1947. Noël Coward on the Air, piano accompaniment, Mantovani. Past CD 7840
- 1956. Noël Coward Album, piano accompaniment, Peter Matz. Sony CD MDK 47253 AAD; CD DRG 19028 (2003).

=== Other recordings ===
- 1939. Beatrice Lillie (A Marvellous Party), piano accompaniment, Will Irwin. AIE CD 006; PLATCD 118
- 1972. Patricia Routledge (Cowardy Custard), piano accompaniment, John Burrows. RCA LSO 60160 LP
- 1994. Kernan, Robertson, Gold (Noël/Cole-Let's Do It), Song CD 910
- 1998. The Divine Comedy (Twentieth-Century Blues: The Songs of Noël Coward)
- 2002. Elaine Stritch (At Liberty), DRG Theater 12994
- 2017. Beverly Knight [The Halcyon – TV Show]

== Sources ==
- Coward, Noël (1977) [1953]. The Noël Coward Song Book. London: Michael Joseph. OCLC 1245813220.
- Mander, Raymond; Joe Mitchenson (2000) [1957]. Barry Day; Sheridan Morley (eds.). Theatrical Companion to Coward (second ed.). London: Oberon. ISBN 978-1-84002-054-0.
