= Devoe Joseph =

Canadian basketball player (born 1989)

Free agent
- Position: Shooting guard

Personal information
- Born: June 21, 1989 (age 37) Toronto, Ontario, Canada
- Listed height: 6 ft 3 in (1.91 m)
- Listed weight: 176 lb (80 kg)

Career information
- High school: Pickering (Ajax, Ontario)
- College: Minnesota (2008–2011); Oregon (2011–2012)
- NBA draft: 2012: undrafted
- Playing career: 2012–present

Career history
- 2012–2013: Khimik
- 2013–2014: Joventut Badalona
- 2014: Türk Telekom
- 2015: Cholet Basket
- 2015–2016: Budućnost Podgorica
- 2016: Maccabi Kiryat Gat
- 2016–2017: Rethymno
- 2017: Bucaneros de La Guaira
- 2017–2018: BC Nokia
- 2018–2019: Bandırma Kırmızı
- 2019–2020: Śląsk Wrocław
- 2020–2021: CSO Voluntari
- 2021–2022: Stelmet Zielona Góra
- 2023: Peja
- 2023: Prishtina
- 2023–2024: BCH Garid
- 2024–2025: Scarborough Shooting Stars

Career highlights
- Kosovo Superleague champion (2023); Montenegrin Cup champion (2016); First-team All-Pac-12 (2012)

Devoe Joseph (born June 21, 1989) is a Canadian professional basketball player who last played for the Scarborough Shooting Stars of the Canadian Elite Basketball League (CEBL). He also represents Canada in international competition.

== High school ==
Joseph attended Pickering High School in Ajax, Ontario. He and his younger brother, Cory, led the school's AAAA basketball team to back-to-back Ontario provincial championships in 2007 and 2008, defeating Eastern Commerce Collegiate Institute both years in the championship game. In the 2008 championship game, he hit a game-winning shot that gave the team a one-point victory. Joseph's father, David, served as the team's assistant coach during that time.

Joseph averaged 24 points, 6 rebounds, and 5 assists per game as a senior. He was also a three-time Canadian High School Player of the Year and three-time Toronto Star High School All-Star. In 2008, he and Cory were selected to play in the annual All-Canada Classic, which showcases the top high school players in Canada.

== College career ==
From 2008–2011, Joseph played for the University of Minnesota before transferring to the University of Oregon for his senior season. That season, he averaged 16.7 points per game, earning a first-team All-Pac-12 selection.

== Professional career ==
After going undrafted in 2012, Joseph joined the Toronto Raptors for the 2012 NBA Summer League. On July 22, 2012, he signed a one-year deal with Khimik of Ukraine.

In July 2013, he re-joined the Raptors for the 2013 NBA Summer League. On September 5, 2013, he signed a one-year deal with Joventut Badalona of Spain.

On July 22, 2014, he signed with Türk Telekom of Turkey. On December 26, 2014, he left them and signed with Cholet Basket of France for the rest of the season.

On August 1, 2015, he signed a one-year deal with Budućnost Podgorica of Montenegro. In April 2016, he left Budućnost.

On October 3, 2016, he signed with Israeli club Maccabi Kiryat Gat. On October 29, 2016, he parted ways with Kiryat Gat after averaging 9.5 points in four games.

On December 16, 2016, he signed with the Greek team Rethymno. He left Rethymno after appearing in three games. In March 2017, he signed with Venezuelan club Bucaneros de La Guaira for the 2017 LPB season.

On December 22, 2017, Joseph signed with Finnish club BC Nokia for the rest of the 2017–18 Korisliiga season.

On November 23, 2018, he has signed with Bandırma Kırmızı of the TBL.

On September 3, 2019, he has signed with Śląsk Wrocław of the PLK. Joseph averaged 16.9 points, 3.5 rebounds, 2.7 assists, and 1.2 steals per game.

On August 16, 2020, he signed with CSO Voluntari of the Liga Națională.

On August 11, 2021, he has signed with Stelmet Zielona Góra of the Polish Basketball League (PLK).

== International career ==
Joseph played for the Canadian junior national team at the 2007 FIBA Under-19 World Championship, where he was the tournament's second-leading scorer with 22.6 points per game. He played for the senior national team at the 2013 FIBA Americas Championship, alongside Cory.

== Personal ==
Joseph's parents, Connie and David Joseph, met at Mount Royal College, where they played for the women's and men's basketball teams, respectively. His younger brother, Cory, currently plays in the Euroleague for Olympiakos . He also has two older sisters, Chantal and Danielle.
