= Cory Joseph =

Canadian basketball player (born 1991)

- Joseph with Olympiacos in 2026

No. 34 – Olympiacos
- Position: Point guard / shooting guard
- League: GBL; EuroLeague

Personal information
- Born: August 20, 1991 (age 35) Toronto, Ontario, Canada
- Listed height: 1.92 m (6 ft 4 in)
- Listed weight: 91 kg (201 lb)

Career information
- High school: Pickering (Ajax, Ontario); Findlay Prep (Henderson, Nevada)
- College: Texas (2010–2011)
- NBA draft: 2011: 1st round, 29th overall pick
- Drafted by: San Antonio Spurs
- Playing career: 2011–present

Career history
- 2011–2015: San Antonio Spurs
- 2012–2013: →Austin Toros
- 2015–2017: Toronto Raptors
- 2017–2019: Indiana Pacers
- 2019–2021: Sacramento Kings
- 2021–2023: Detroit Pistons
- 2023–2024: Golden State Warriors
- 2024–2025: Orlando Magic
- 2026–present: Olympiacos

Career highlights
- NBA champion (2014); EuroLeague champion (2026); Greek League champion (2026); Greek Super Cup winner (2026); All-NBA D-League Second Team (2013); All-NBA D-League Defensive Second Team (2013); Big 12 All-Freshman team (2011); McDonald's All-American (2010); First-team Parade All-American (2010)
- Stats at NBA.com
- Stats at Basketball Reference
Medals
Men's basketball
Representing Canada
FIBA AmeriCup
Bronze medal – third place	2015 Mexico City	National team
FIBA Americas U18 Championship
Bronze medal – third place	2008 Formosa	National team

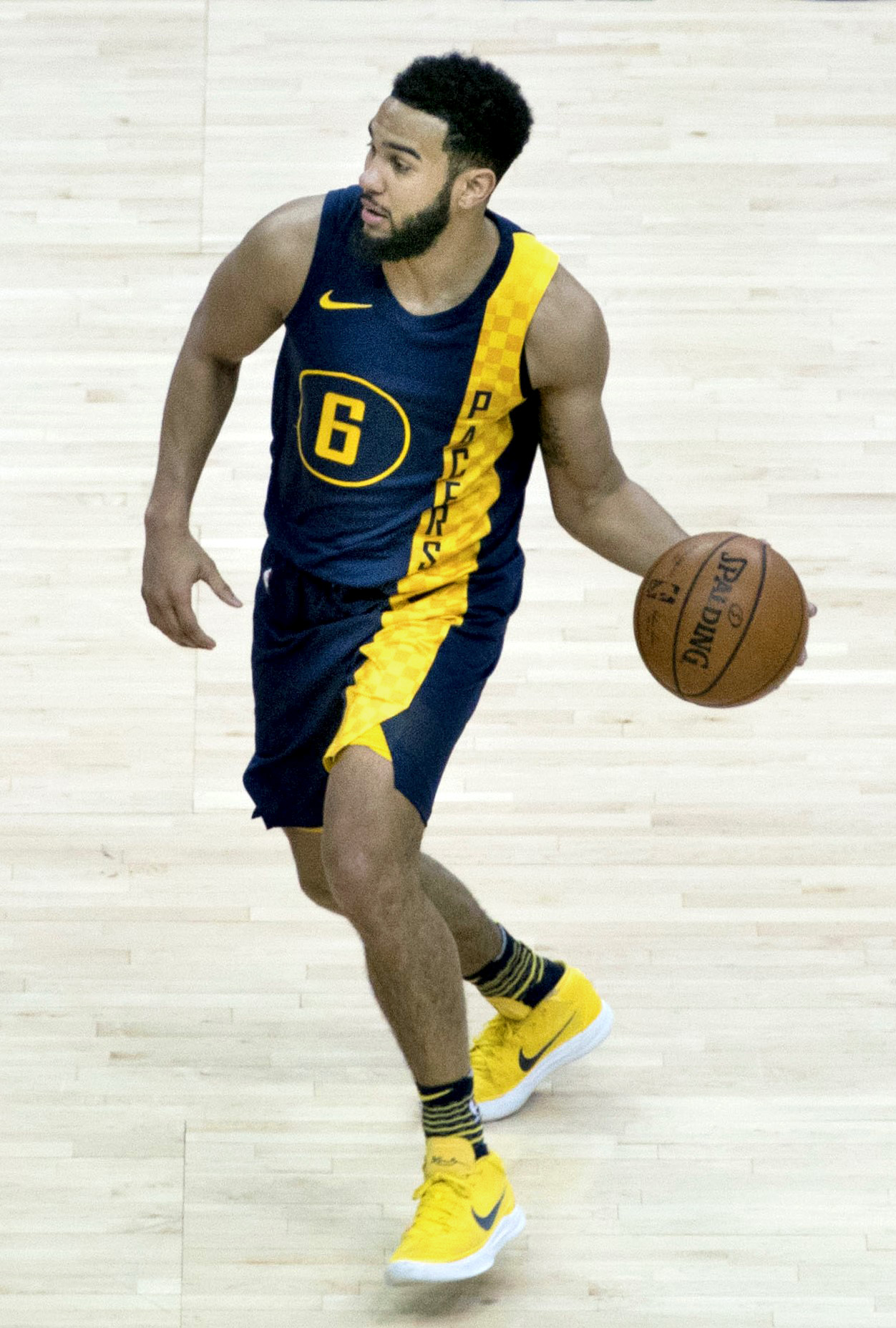
Joseph with the Indiana Pacers in 2018

Cory Ephram Joseph (born August 20, 1991) is a Canadian professional basketball player for Olympiacos of the Greek Basketball League (GBL) and the EuroLeague. He plays the combo guard position and was previously the captain of the Canadian national team.

== Early life and family ==
Joseph was born in Toronto, Ontario, the youngest of four children of Connie and David Joseph, who was born in Trinidad and Tobago. He grew up in nearby Pickering in a basketball family; his parents met as student athletes at Mount Royal College while playing for their respective men's and women's basketball teams. His father won a CCAA national championship, playing for the Southern Alberta Institute of Technology, and later coached at the high school, college, and professional levels. His mother coached and refereed at various levels. Joseph has two older sisters, Chantal and Danielle, and an older brother, Devoe, who played in college for Minnesota and Oregon, and currently plays professionally in Europe.

Two of Joseph's second cousins also played college basketball: Kris played for Syracuse and was selected in the second round of the 2012 NBA draft by the Boston Celtics, while Maurice played for Michigan State and Vermont, and formerly served as the head coach of George Washington University. Another cousin of Joseph's, Ashton Khan, is also a professional basketball player who plays in the British Basketball League.

As a youth, Joseph and fellow future NBA player Kelly Olynyk were both on a Scarborough Blues club team that rarely lost in the late 1990s and early 2000s. One defeat came against rival Toronto 5–0, led by Stephen Curry.

== High school career ==
Joseph attended Pickering High School in Ajax, Ontario. He and his brother Devoe led the school's AAAA basketball team to back-to-back Ontario provincial championships in 2007 and 2008, defeating Eastern Commerce Collegiate Institute both years in the championship game. Their father served as the team's assistant coach during that time. In 2008, he and Devoe were selected to play in the annual All-Canada Classic, which showcases the top high school players in Canada.

Later that year, at age 16, Joseph transferred to Findlay Prep in Henderson, Nevada with Tristan Thompson, his close friend and AAU teammate. He increased his recruiting demand by leading Findlay Prep to the ESPN RISE National High School Invitational championship game in 2009, alongside Thompson and Avery Bradley, in which #2 ranked Findlay Prep defeated #1 ranked Oak Hill Academy, 74–66. He was named to the ESPN RISE All-Tournament Team. In August 2009, Joseph was selected to play in the fourth annual Boost Mobile Elite 24 basketball game at Rucker Park in Harlem, New York City. The game showcases the top 24 high school basketball players in the U.S. regardless of recruiting class.

In his senior year, Joseph and Thompson led #2 ranked Findlay Prep to a second consecutive ESPN RISE National High School Invitational championship in 2010, when they defeated #1 ranked Montverde Academy, 59–46. He was named to the ESPN RISE All-Tournament Team for the second consecutive year and was also named tournament MVP. He was ranked as the #7 prospect nationally by Rivals.com and #11 in the ESPNU 100 following the season, in which he averaged 18.8 points, 4.9 assists, 6.7 rebounds, and 2.5 steals per game. Joseph then played in the 2010 McDonald's All-American Game. He also won the McDonald's Three Point Competition and was named a Jordan Brand Classic All-American. On April 11, 2010, he played for the World Select Team at the Nike Hoop Summit, against the United States Junior Select Team. The game was held at the Rose Garden in Portland, Oregon. The World Select Team lost, 101–97. Twelve days later, Joseph committed to the University of Texas, joining Thompson.

== College career ==
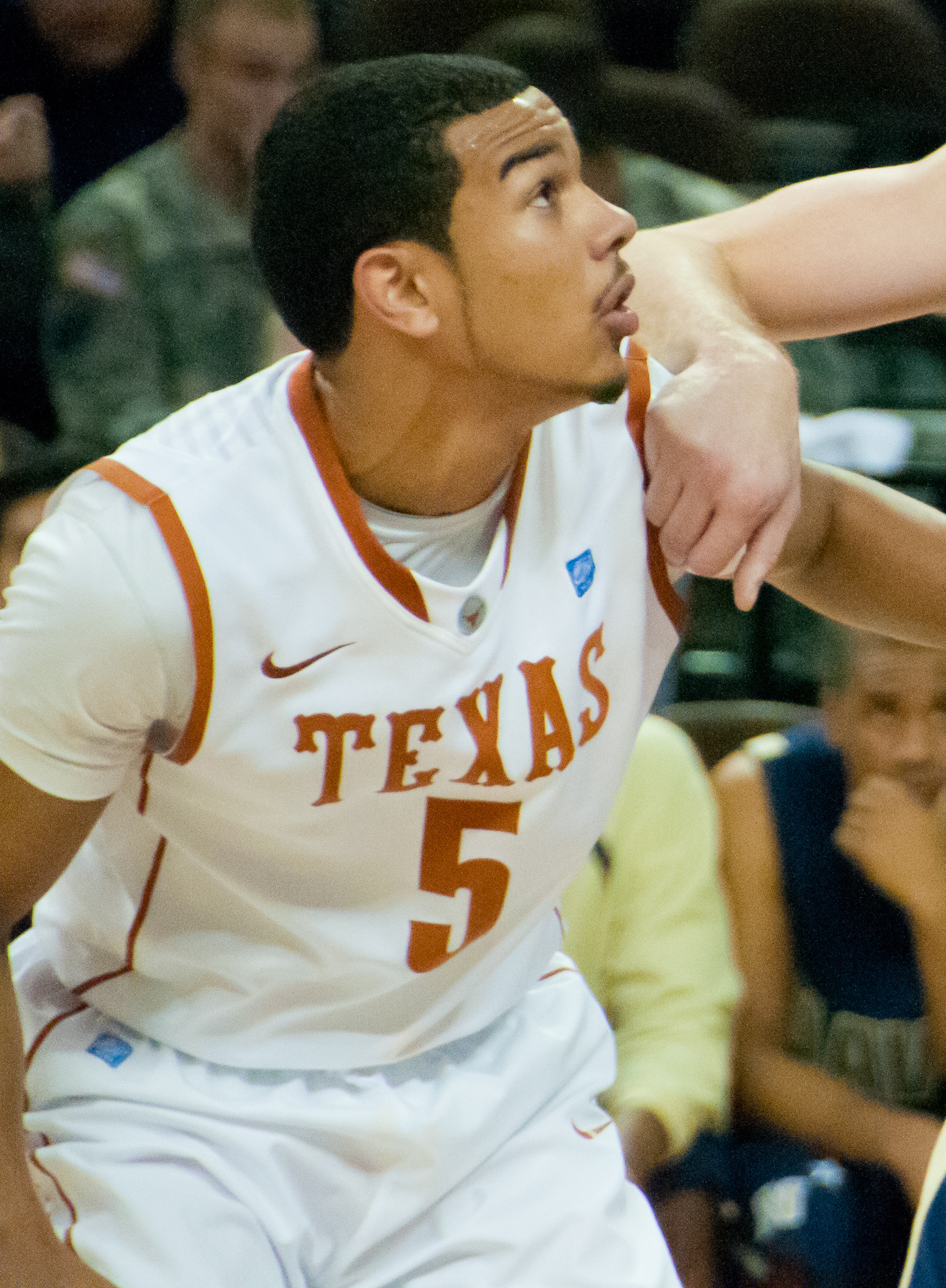
Joseph with the Texas Longhorns, 2010

Joseph started all 36 games in his freshman season, leading the team in scoring four times and in rebounding twice. Joseph played one of his best games on December 18, 2010, recording a season-high 21 points and a game-winning jumper against North Carolina. Texas entered 2011 NCAA March Madness as the fourth seed in the West Regional Division. Texas lost to fifth-seeded Arizona in the third round with a standout performance and game-winning shot from Derrick Williams. Following the end of the season, Joseph declared for the NBA draft and was named to the Big 12 All-Freshman team.

== Professional career ==
=== San Antonio Spurs (2011–2015) ===
On June 23, 2011, Joseph was drafted 29th overall in the 2011 NBA draft by the San Antonio Spurs. Fellow Canadian and Longhorn, Thompson, was drafted fourth overall by the Cleveland Cavaliers, becoming the highest Canadian born draftee in NBA history at that point. (Anthony Bennett and Andrew Wiggins both went first overall in the 2013 and 2014 drafts respectively.) It was also the second time in NBA history that two Canadians were selected in the first round of the same draft, the first being in 1983 when Leo Rautins and Stewart Granger were selected 17th and 25th, respectively. The 2011 draft was also the first time three Texas Longhorn basketball players went in the first round after Joseph's former collegiate teammate Jordan Hamilton went 26th overall to Dallas Mavericks.

During the 2011–12 season, the Spurs assigned Joseph to the Austin Toros of the NBA D-League three times. He was also assigned to the Toros during the 2012–13 season. On February 4, 2013, Joseph was named to the Prospects All-Star roster for the 2013 NBA D-League All-Star Game. However, due to injury, he was replaced by Justin Dentmon.

In late February 2013, Tony Parker sustained an injury, and Joseph became the Spurs' starting point guard. In his first five starts, Joseph averaged 8.8 points and 2.6 assists while shooting 58.6 percent. Joseph helped the Spurs reach the 2013 NBA Finals against the Miami Heat, but San Antonio lost the series in seven games.

On June 15, 2014, Joseph won his first NBA championship after the Spurs defeated the Miami Heat 4 games to 1 in the 2014 NBA Finals.

On June 30, 2015, the Spurs extended a qualifying offer to Joseph in order to make him a restricted free agent but, on July 5, the team withdrew their qualifying offer.

=== Toronto Raptors (2015–2017) ===
On July 9, 2015, Joseph signed a four-year, $30 million contract with his hometown team, the Toronto Raptors. He made his debut for the Raptors in their season opener on October 28, 2015, recording three points and two rebounds in a 106–99 win over the Indiana Pacers. Over his first few games with the Raptors, Joseph began to flourish in his role as backup point guard, averaging a career-high 23 minutes per game. On November 6, 2015, he scored a season-high 19 points against the Orlando Magic, one off his career high of 20. On November 28, 2015, he scored 12 points and made a three-pointer at the buzzer following a well-worked inbounds play, lifting the Raptors an 84–82 win over the Washington Wizards. The Raptors finished the regular season as the second seed in the East with a 56–26 record. On April 16, 2016, Joseph scored a playoff career-high 18 points in a Game 1 loss to the seventh-seeded Indiana Pacers in the first round.

On January 17, 2017, Joseph scored a career-high 33 points in a 119–109 win over the Brooklyn Nets. On March 27, 2017, he had his first career double-double with 15 points and a career-high 13 assists in a 131–112 win over the Orlando Magic. On May 7, 2017, in Game 4 of the Raptors' second-round playoff series with the Cleveland Cavaliers, Joseph had 20 points and 12 assists while starting in place of the injured Kyle Lowry; the Raptors were defeated 109–102 to bow out of the playoffs in a clean sweep, losing 4–0 to the Cavaliers.

=== Indiana Pacers (2017–2019) ===
On July 14, 2017, Joseph was traded to the Indiana Pacers in exchange for the draft rights of Emir Preldžić. In his debut for the Pacers in their season opener on October 18, 2017, Joseph scored 11 points in a 140–131 win over the Brooklyn Nets.

On February 9, 2019, Joseph had 10 points, 10 assists and nine rebounds in a 105–90 win over the Cleveland Cavaliers.

=== Sacramento Kings (2019–2021) ===
On July 6, 2019, Joseph signed with the Sacramento Kings.

On January 30, 2020, Joseph scored a season-high 16 points, while also getting two rebounds, seven assists, one steal and one block in an 124–103 victory against the Los Angeles Clippers.

=== Detroit Pistons (2021–2023) ===
On March 26, 2021, Joseph was traded to the Detroit Pistons, along with two future second-round draft picks, in exchange for Delon Wright.

On July 31, 2021, Joseph was waived by the Pistons. On August 11, 2021, Joseph was re-signed by the Pistons.

=== Golden State Warriors (2023–2024) ===
On July 6, 2023, Joseph signed with the Golden State Warriors.

On February 8, 2024, Joseph was traded to the Indiana Pacers and was subsequently waived.

=== Orlando Magic (2024–2025) ===
On July 19, 2024, Joseph signed with the Orlando Magic. He made 50 appearances (16 starts) for Orlando during the 2024–25 NBA season, averaging 3.5 points, 1.5 rebounds, and 1.4 assists. On June 16, 2025, it was reported that the Magic had declined a team option that would have extended Joseph's contract, rendering him a free agent.

Joseph was announced as a new AS Monaco player on December 4, 2025. On December 12th, the French Basketball League denied his registration. The team appealed the decision. Monaco would later release a statement announcing a mutual agreement to part ways with Joseph, citing constraints related to the player's registration in the French league.

=== Olympiacos (2026–present) ===
On January 23, 2026, Joseph signed with Olympiacos of the Greek Basketball League (GBL) and the EuroLeague. He re-signed with the team on July 8.

== Career statistics ==
Legend
GP	Games played	GS	Games started	MPG	Minutes per game
FG%	Field goal percentage	3P%	3-point field goal percentage	FT%	Free throw percentage
RPG	Rebounds per game	APG	Assists per game	SPG	Steals per game
BPG	Blocks per game	PPG	Points per game	**Bold**	Career high
†	Won an NBA championship	*	Led the league

=== NBA ===
==== Regular season ====
Year	Team	GP	GS	MPG	FG%	3P%	FT%	RPG	APG	SPG	BPG	PPG
2011–12	San Antonio	29	1	9.2	.314	.200	.647	.9	1.2	.2	.1	2.0
2012–13	San Antonio	28	9	13.9	.464	.286	.857	1.9	1.9	.5	.1	4.5
2013–14†	San Antonio	68	19	13.8	.475	.316	.823	1.6	1.7	.5	.2	5.0
2014–15	San Antonio	79	14	18.3	.504	.364	.734	2.4	2.4	.6	.2	6.8
2015–16	Toronto	80	4	25.6	.439	.273	.764	2.6	3.1	.8	.3	8.5
2016–17	Toronto	80	22	25.0	.452	.356	.770	3.0	3.3	.8	.2	9.3
2017–18	Indiana	**82***	17	**27.0**	.424	.353	.745	3.2	3.2	1.0	.2	7.9
2018–19	Indiana	**82***	9	25.2	.412	.322	.698	**3.4**	3.9	1.1	.3	6.5
2019–20	Sacramento	72	26	24.4	.415	.352	.857	2.6	3.5	.7	.3	6.4
2020–21	Sacramento	44	2	21.5	.444	.330	.766	2.3	2.5	.9	.2	6.6
2020–21	Detroit	19	11	26.4	**.506**	.368	.878	3.2	**5.5**	**1.2**	**.5**	**12.0**
2021–22	Detroit	65	**39**	24.6	.445	**.414**	**.885**	2.7	3.6	.6	.3	8.0
2022–23	Detroit	62	2	19.8	.427	.389	.792	1.7	3.5	.6	.3	6.9
2023–24	Golden State	26	0	11.4	.359	.310	.571	1.2	1.6	.2	.1	2.4
2024–25	Orlando	50	16	12.2	.403	.364	.778	1.5	1.4	.5	.1	3.5
Career		866	191	21.1	.440	.350	.786	2.4	2.9	.7	.2	6.7

==== Playoffs ====
Year	Team	GP	GS	MPG	FG%	3P%	FT%	RPG	APG	SPG	BPG	PPG
2013	San Antonio	**20**	0	9.6	.464	.182	.455	1.6	1.2	.3	.1	3.0
2014†	San Antonio	17	0	5.1	.486	.000	.778	0.5	0.5	.2	.0	2.8
2015	San Antonio	4	0	5.5	**.833**	–	.500	0.3	0.0	.0	.3	2.8
2016	Toronto	**20**	0	22.6	.466	.333	.750	2.1	2.4	.9	.1	**8.5**
2017	Toronto	10	2	21.2	.437	.409	**1.000**	2.1	**3.1**	.4	.2	7.9
2018	Indiana	7	0	20.4	.364	.273	**1.000**	**2.4**	3.0	**1.3**	.3	4.7
2019	Indiana	4	0	21.3	.500	**.444**	**1.000**	1.8	1.0	1.0	.0	7.5
2025	Orlando	5	**5**	**24.8**	.417	.313	—	1.8	3.0	1.0	**.4**	5.0
Career		87	7	17.1	.458	.323	.759	1.6	1.7	.6	.1	5.2

=== College ===
Year	Team	GP	GS	MPG	FG%	3P%	FT%	RPG	APG	SPG	BPG	PPG
2010–11	Texas	36	36	32.4	.422	.413	.699	3.6	3.0	1.0	0.3	10.4

== National team career ==
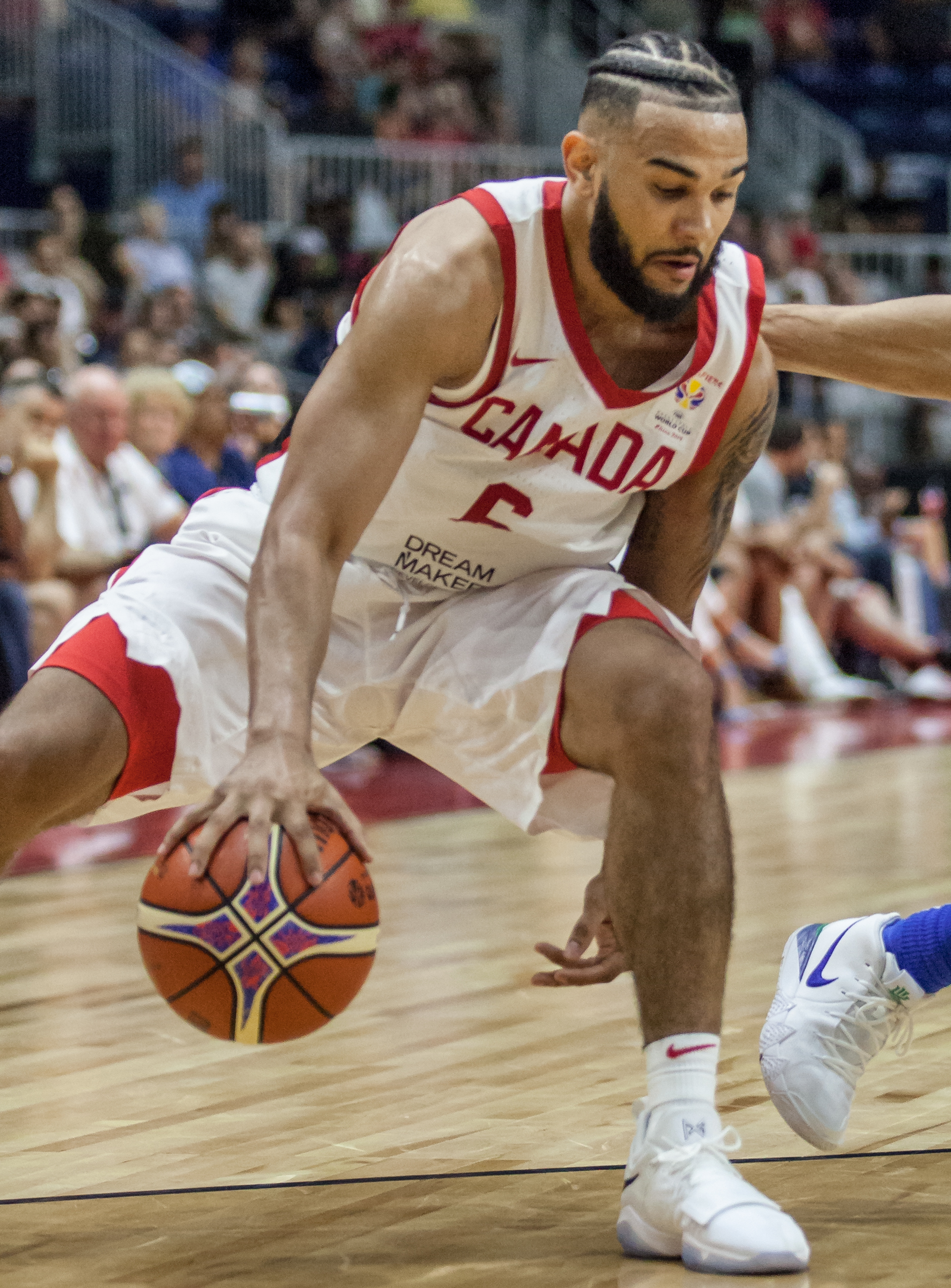
Joseph with the Canadian national team, 2018

Joseph represented his country and Canada Basketball at the 2008 FIBA Americas Under-18 Championship, where Canada won the bronze medal, placing behind Argentina and the United States. Joseph once again competed for Canada at the 2009 FIBA Under-19 World Championship in Auckland, New Zealand.

Joseph joined the Canadian men's national basketball team for stage two of their pre-2011 FIBA Americas Championship training camp in early August. He made his senior national team debut at the 2011 Jack Donohue International Classic, on August 13, 2011, at Ryerson University (now Toronto Metropolitan University) against Belgium. In Joseph's debut, he posted 3 points and 2 assists in 15 minutes of game time in a 79–74 victory.

At the 2013 FIBA Americas Championship, he led the team in scoring with 16.1 points per game, playing alongside his brother, Devoe.

Prior to the 2015 FIBA Americas Championship, Joseph was named captain of the national team. In the bronze medal game against Mexico, Joseph hit a buzzer-beating shot that gave Canada an 87–86 victory. He led the 2016 FIBA World Olympic Qualifying Tournament in Manila in points and assists with 77 points and 17 assists (4.3 APG) in four games. Joseph also played for Canada during the 2019 FIBA Basketball World Cup in China after playing three games in the Americas qualifying tournament to help Canada advance to the World Cup.

On May 24, 2022, Joseph agreed to a three-year commitment to play with the Canadian senior men's national team.

== See also ==
- List of Canadians in the National Basketball Association
