= Herbie Helbig =

Canadian musician

Herbie Helbig

Herbie Helbig (c. 1933, Germany - June 21, 1983, Toronto) was a Canadian pianist, harpsichordist, arranger, and composer of German birth. He was trained as a musician in Germany, Canada, and England. While his schooling was principally in classical music he had success as a jazz pianist. He worked as a composer and arranger for film, television, radio, and the stage.

== Career ==
Born in Germany in c. 1933, Helbig initially trained as a classical musician in his native country; learning to play standard works by Ludwig van Beethoven and Wolfgang Amadeus Mozart among other composers. In 1953 he immigrated to Canada where he studied music composition and piano at The Royal Conservatory of Music with Samuel Dolin. He pursued further studies in music at the University of Toronto and in England at Durham University.

In 1954 Helbig performed in concerts sponsored by The New Jazz Society in Toronto. In Canada he performed in concerts with American jazz musicians J. J. Johnson, Kenny Dorham, Sonny Stitt, and Wardell Gray during the 1950s. In England he performed in concerts with Jack Parnell and Tony Crombie. He also performed in Canada as a member of Mart Kenney's orchestra. In 1960 his Herman Helbig Trio performed at the Canadian Jazz Workshop Festival in Toronto, and that same year performed and recorded as a member of Pat Riccio's band.

Helbig was a resident pianist at the Windsor Arms Hotel beginning in the 1960s until the end of his life. His repertoire in the piano bar of Windsor Arms's Club 22 ranged from jazz standards to classical works by Mozart to his own original compositions. He was a member of Peter Appleyard's quartet with whom he recorded the 1965 LP The Peter Appleyard Quartet. He made a LP recording in 1969 titled A Classical gas in which he played both piano and harpsichord. He was music director for the show That 5 AM Jazz at Toronto's Theatre in the Dell in 1967 which starred the actor and singer Stevie Wise. In 1969 he was a featured pianist on the Canadian daytime television series Islands and Princesses; a series in which he performed classical piano works by composers like Chopin. The following year he returned to Theatre in the Dell to work as the musical director for the original production of the revised version Oh, Coward!; a revue of the music of Noël Coward which starred Tom Kneebone, Dinah Christie, and Roderick Cook. It was the seventh professional musical production he had worked as musical director. In 1974 he composed and directed the music for the premiere production of Munroe Scott's Wu-feng which was staged at the St. Lawrence Centre for the Arts.

Helbig had his own program on Canadian radio for five years. He was also known for his work as a concert pianist and film and television score composer in Canada. He composed the scores to the films The Crowd Inside (1971), and Feelin' Great (1973). He also wrote the scores for many television documentaries made by the Canadian Broadcast Corporation; including First Person Singular: Pearson – The Memoirs of a Prime Minister (1973). From 1971-1983 he was the pianist for the children's television show Polka Dot Door. In 1979 he performed for the inaugural opening of the new Sotheby Parke Bernet auction house in Toronto. He also worked as a composer of jingles for Canadian television and radio which he made with his own production company.

Helbig died in Toronto from a blood clot on June 21, 1983 at the age of 50.
