= Subway Academy I =

Coordinates: 43°40′44.9″N 79°20′11.9″W

Location
- 16 Phin Avenue; Toronto, Ontario, M4J 3T2; Canada

Information
- School type: High school
- School board: Toronto District School Board
- Superintendent: Uton Robinson
- Area trustee: Jennifer Story
- Principal: Denis Lopes
- Grades: 10-12
- Enrolment: 50
- Language: English
- Schedule type: Semestered

Subway Academy I is a public alternative high school in Toronto, Ontario, Canada. Originally, Subway Academy I was simply called "Subway Academy", but after Subway Academy II opened, the name was changed to "Subway Academy I". It was founded in September 1973, making it one of the oldest secondary alternative schools in Toronto. The original staff were Achim Krull, Judith Robertson and Murray Shukyn. The school was a reflection of the Ivan Illich "deschooling" movement, which proposed that people would learn best from community resources. As a result, a directory of resources along the Toronto subway system was created, and the school derives its name from that initiative. The community resource aspect of the program however faded very quickly. Students were more interested in formal credit courses and academic courses leading to admission to university or college. Subway Academy started as an independent studies program. It was intended to make education available to students with family or other obligations which limited their ability to attend school during regular hours and who could not attend night school. The school enrolled students at any time during the year, not just in September. Originally, there was no upper age limit on enrolment. The school attracted many adults. The independent studies program at Subway Academy operated very differently from regular high school programs. Students met their teachers by appointment several times a week, but there were no formal classes. During the appointments, students reviewed their progress with their teachers, wrote tests, handed in assignments, and received new work. Students could work at the school, or at home, or at the local library, wherever they were comfortable. Students started courses when they joined, and finished courses whenever they had completed all the required work. Additional courses could be started at any time. Today Subway Academy combined formal classes with independent studies, and students are required to complete courses during a regular semestered timeframe. Subway Academy One continues to share a building with Eastern Commerce Collegiate Institute. Today it offers courses from grades 9 to 12 at both the academic and applied level. As the enrolment at Subway Academy increased, it was divided into two branches. Subway Academy II was opened in the west end of Toronto. Judith Robertson became the first coordinator of that program. It continues today as an independent studies program.

== See also ==
- Education in Ontario
- List of secondary schools in Ontario
