= Report (disambiguation) =

A report is an informational work, such as a document or speech.

Report may also refer to:

== Arts, entertainment, and media ==
- The Report (1977 film), an Iranian film
- The Report (2019 film), a historical / political drama film
- Report (film), a 1967 art film
- Report (newsmagazine), a Canadian news magazine
- Report (TV series), a journalistic TV program in Italy
- Report Canada, a 1978 Canadian television series
- Report series of portable reel-to-reel tape recorders produced by Uher in Germany from 1961 to 1999, commonly used by professionals such as journalists and film-makers

== Education ==
- Report (punishment)
- Report card

== Health care ==
- Report (nursing), the exchange of information between nursing staff members at change of shift
- Incident report

== Other uses ==
- Reports, simple non-inferential passages
