= Cindy Cook =

Canadian children's entertainer

Cindy Cook is a retired Canadian children's entertainer. A graduate of York University's theatre program (1979), she was hired as a host on the long-running children's series Polka Dot Door in 1981. Cindy became the longest-serving female host in the program's history, and one of the few to work with two producers; Coneybeare from 1981-84 and MacKay from 1985-93

Polka Dot Door was syndicated world-wide until 1993; when the series ended, she continued to tour across Canada and U.S. with Polka Dot Door Live until 2010. Cook also toured Canada for five years as host of Bananas in Pajamas Live.

In 1988, Cook formed her own production company Time To Read Productions Limited, creating the series Time To Read for MCTV and YTV. The series ran for five years and 130 episodes. She also released a CD ... Sing and Spell with Cindy Cook. It was produced and written by Canadian musician Willie P. Bennett and Kevin Knelman.

Based on the popularity of both series, Cook created her own stage shows for theatres, festivals, fairs, schools, libraries and corporate events. She continues to perform her musical shows, covering the themes of literacy, environment, and safety, along with her popular Christmas concerts, across Canada, U.S.A. and Singapore.

In 2020, because of the COVID-19 pandemic, shows were broadcast virtually.
