= Heather Conkie =

Canadian television writer and producer

Heather Conkie is a veteran Canadian television writer and producer who began her career as an actress. She was featured in multiple children's shows in the 1980s on TVOntario beginning first with Polka Dot Door.

Her first screenwriting credit was for Beethoven Lives Upstairs (1992). She has subsequently worked extensively as a writer for numerous television series in Canada including Road to Avonlea, 7th Heaven, The Zack Files, Pit Pony, Dark Oracle and Heartland, as well as several made for television movies.

Conkie served as writer and executive producer for The Hallmark Channel series The Way Home, which she also co-created

Alexandra Clarke, Conkie's daughter, began working with her mother on Heartland and now works with her on The Way Home.

As an on-screen performer, she was the host of Report Canada and Music Box. She played two characters (the main character, and her landlady Agnes Peabody) in a music-education show called It's Mainly Music. She reprised the role of Agnes Peabody in a spin-off show called Dear Aunt Agnes.
