= Ontario National Theatre School DramaFest =

The Ontario National Theatre School DramaFest (previously the Ontario Drama Festival widely known as the Sears Drama Festival and originally the Simpsons Drama Festival), is an annual competition for high schools, organized by the National Theatre School, in which thousands of high school students compete. It was founded in 1946 by Ken Watts. Winners of the competition are awarded scholarships to theatre arts schools in Canada. Keanu Reeves, Rachel McAdams, Margot Kidder, Kelly Hope Taylor, R.H. Thomson, Judith Thompson, Alex Laurier, and David Cronenberg are among the festival's alumni.

The festival, and its sister festivals in British Columbia (founded in 2005) and Atlantic Canada (founded on 2011), involve 400 high schools and 15,000 students each year in drama competitions.

Funded for most of its existence by Sears Canada (and previously, by retailer Simpsons), a partnership was arranged in 2017 with the National Theatre School and IATSE after Sears Canada withdrew its funding of $200,000 annually, due to the retailer's financial problems.
