= L. Ted Coneybeare =

Canadian television producer

Leo Howard Coneybeare or L. Ted Coneybeare
- Born: March 1925; Essex County, Canada
- Died: 16 January 2012 (aged 86)
- Education: Wayne State University (B.S.)
- Occupations: Producer; Teacher; Educational Consultant
- Years active: 1972–1984
- Awards: Gemini Award

Leo Howard "Ted" Coneybeare (March 1925 — 16 January 2012) was a Canadian television producer and educational consultant for acclaimed Canadian TV series Polka Dot Door, which he produced for TV Ontario from 1972 to 1984.

== Early life and education ==
He was born in a farming family to Howard and Evelyn (Bloom) in March 1925 at Essex County, Canada . He studied at Essex High School and received teacher training at London Normal School. He graduated from University of Western Ontario, Assumption College and the Ontario Department of Education Summer Schools. In 1952, he received his Bachelor of Science in Education from Wayne State University, Detroit with a major in Art Education.

== Personal life ==
Coneybeare married Raymond Snell at Toronto's Metropolitan Community Church in October 2007, after they had lived almost 40 years together. Snell died in 2010. Conybeare died two years later in 2012 at 86, after a long battle with cancer.

== Career ==
He enrolled in the Canadian Armed Forces during the Second World War before taking up his first teaching job in a rural school in Windsor, and later adopted television production as his full-time occupation. As an educational supervisor, educator, and producer, he made over 400 television episodes.

Coneybeare retired in 1982, but produced 30 more episodes of Polka Dot Door as a consultant before leaving the show for good. He also created two other series, Guess What? with Jan Rubeš and Tell Me a Story.

== Awards ==
Coneybeare is a recipient of several awards including a Gemini Award in 2010.
