= First Person Singular: Pearson – The Memoirs of a Prime Minister =

Canadian biographical television miniseries

- Genre: Biography
- Written by: Munroe Scott
- Theme music composer: Herbie Helbig
- Country of origin: Canada
- Original language: English
- No. of seasons: 1
- No. of episodes: 13

Production
- Producer: Camero n Graham
- Running time: 30 minutes

Original release
- Network: CBC Television
- Release: 27 May – 19 August 1973

Related
- One Canadian: The Political Memoirs of the Rt. Hon. John G. Diefenbaker

First Person Singular: Pearson – The Memoirs of a Prime Minister is a Canadian biographical television miniseries that aired on CBC Television from 1973 to 1975.

== Premise ==
Bernard Ostry interviewed and former Canadian Prime Minister Lester B. Pearson in this series. Episodes featured this interview footage combined with historic photographs and other film footage of Pearson.

== Scheduling ==
This half-hour series was broadcast on Sundays at 10:00 p.m. (Eastern) from 27 May to 19 August 1973. It was rebroadcast Wednesdays at 10:30 p.m. from 23 October 1974 to 15 January 1975.

== Episodes ==
The series was divided into segments titled as follows:

1. 27 May 1973: "Childhood and Youth"
2. 3 June 1973: "The Undergraduate"
3. 10 June 1973: "To War and Back (1915-1918)"
4. 17 June 1973: "Crossroads 1919-28"
5. 24 June 1973: "The Apprentice 1928-39"
6. 1 July 1973: "Prelude to War 1930-39"
7. 8 July 1973: "Diplomat at War 1939-1941"
8. 15 July 1973: "Diplomat at War 1941-1945"
9. 22 July 1973: "External Affairs 1945-1955"
10. 29 July 1973: "Suez to the Flag 1956-1965"
11. 5 August 1973: "Confederation and Conflict" (1963–67)
12. 12 August 1973: "Friends and Relations (1967-1968)"
13. 19 August 1973: "Retrospect on Power"
