= Pickering High School, Ajax =

Pickering High School

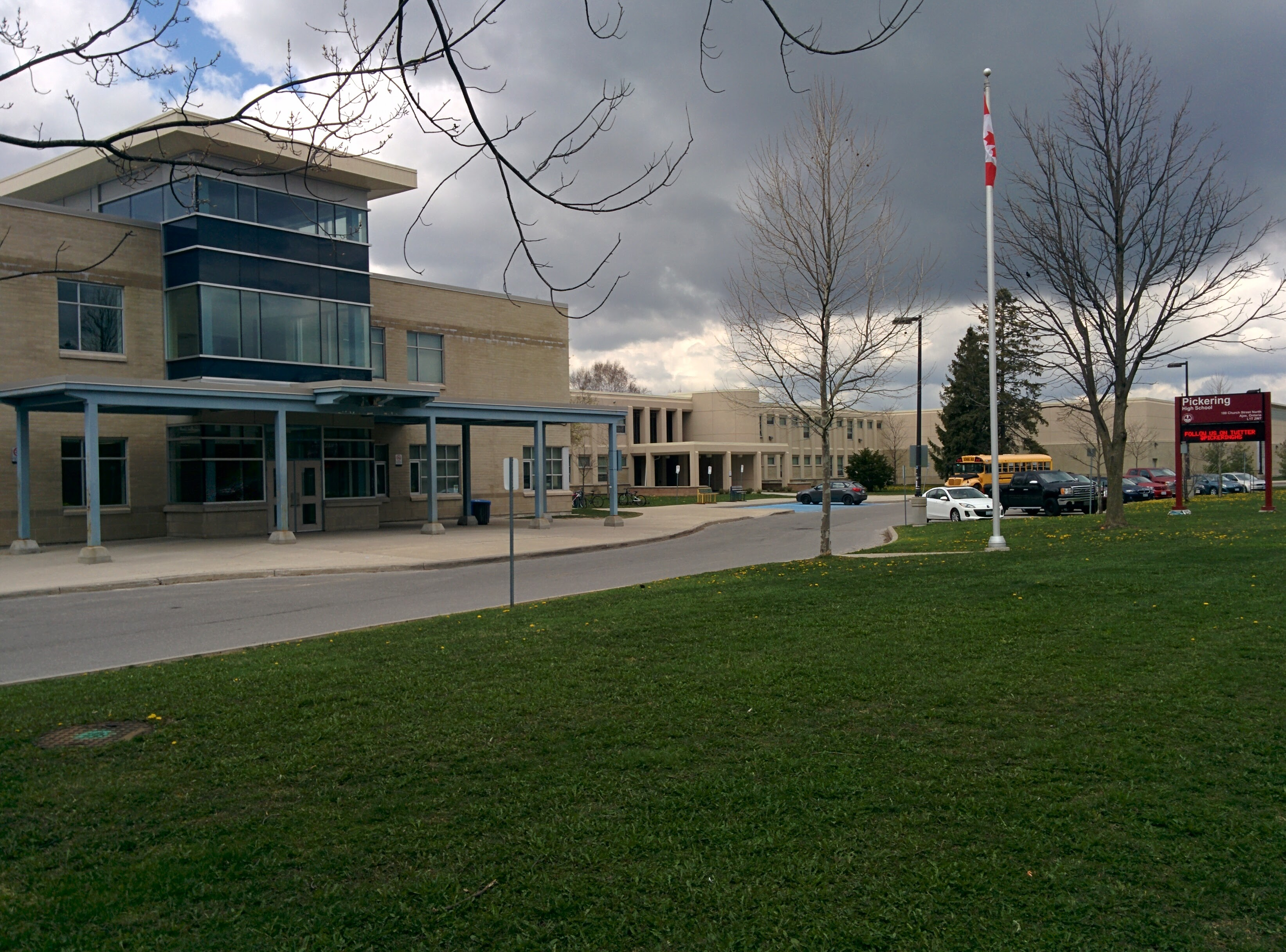

Location
- 180 Church Street North; Ajax, Ontario, L1T 2W7; Canada; 43°51′31″N 79°3′31″W

Information
- School type: Public Secondary School
- Motto: Enter to Learn. Go Forth to Serve.
- Founded: 1951
- School board: Durham District School Board
- Superintendent: Mohamed Hamid
- Area trustee: Kate Bird
- Principal: Melissa Hunte
- Grades: 9–12
- Enrolment: Over 2000 (2026/2027)
- Language: English
- Colours: Green and Yellow
- Mascot: Trojan
- Team name: Trojans
- Website: School website

Pickering High School is a Canadian high school located in Ajax, Ontario, within the Durham District School Board serving the west Ajax and east Pickering area. Specifically, the school is found in historical Pickering Village, Ontario on Church Street. The school has students in grades 9 to 12, and offers French Immersion, gifted, co-op, and special education classes. Some gifted classes include: English, Science, Geography, History, and Mathematics.

Pickering High School was established in 1951. The school has undergone several expansions and renovations and offers a variety of extracurricular activities, including athletics, clubs, arts programs, and student leadership opportunities, and has produced notable alumni in areas such as sports, entertainment, journalism, and music.

== History ==
Pickering High School dates back to the development of secondary education in the Pickering Village area. Before the present school was constructed, the site was occupied by several earlier schools. A three-room schoolhouse was built on the site in 1888 as the population of the village increased. The school became a continuation school in 1909, but the building was later condemned by the Department of Education in 1925. A new five-room public and continuation school was subsequently constructed on the site, continuing to provide secondary education to students in the Pickering Village area before the establishment of the present high school.

Pickering High School was established in 1951, with the new school opening in September of that year as Pickering District High School. The establishment of the school came during a period of significant population growth in the region following the Second World War.

The growth of the surrounding area was strongly influenced by the Second World War. During the war, the federal government established the Defence industries Limited munitions plant in Pickering Township. The facility employed thousands of workers and contributed to the rapid development of the Ajax community. Following the war, many workers remained in the area, contributing to the continued population growth and an increasing demand for schools and other public services. Pickering District High School was established during this period of post-war expansion and became an important secondary school for students from both Ajax and Pickering.

Contemporary reports described the new building as serving students from the surrounding Pickering Township and Ajax areas. Although the school is now located in Ajax, Ontario, its name reflected its historical connection to Pickering Township. The school is located in Pickering Village, which was historically part of Pickering Township. In 1974, as part of the reorganization of Durham Region, the Town of Ajax was expanded to include Pickering Village and surrounding areas that had previously been part of Pickering Township. The school therefore remained at its original location while becoming part of Ajax.

As the population of Ajax, Pickering and the surrounding communities continued to grow the enrollment at Pickering High school increased. A major addition was constructed in 1972 to provide additional classrooms and educational space. During the 1960s, the school also had a rifle club, which was one of its notable extracurricular activities during the period.

By the 2000s, the school facilities had become increasingly outdated, and additional classrooms were required. In 2007, the Durham District School Board approved a major $21.4 million renovation and expansion project. The project included the construction of a new addition, as well as improvements to the school's athletic facilities. Following these expansions and renovations, Pickering High School became the largest secondary school in the Durham District School Board in terms of both student population and physical size, and one of the largest secondary schools in Ontario. The school serves a large student population from west Ajax, east Pickering, and the surrounding communities.

In 2026, Pickering High School celebrated its 75th anniversary, marking 75 years since the establishment of the school in 1951.

== Academics ==
Pickering High School offers a variety of academic programs for students in grades 9 to 12. Students can choose from university, college, workplace and mixed-level courses depending on their interest and plans for post-secondary education or employment. The school offers courses in subjects including English, mathematics, science, Canadian and world studies, the arts, business, technology, physical education and modern languages.

The school also provides specialized programs for students with different learning needs and academic interests. These include gifted education, cooperative education, and special education. Gifted courses are offered in subjects such as English, mathematics, science, geography and history. Cooperative education allows students to earn credits through supervised work placements, while special education programs provide additional support for students who require accommodations or specialized instruction.

In the 2023-2024 school year, Pickering High School was ranked 111th out of 747 secondary schools in Ontario in a study conducted by the Fraser Institute. The school received an overall score of 7.8 out of 10. The ranking was based primarily on student performance in areas including Grade 9 Mathematics and the Ontario Secondary School Literacy Test (OSSLT). The Fraser Institute is a Canadian think tank that publishes studies and reports on education and other public-policy issues. The ranking represents the results of the institute's assessment and does not constitute an official ranking by the Ontario Ministry of Education or the Durham District School Board.

== Notable alumni ==
- Charlotte Arnold, actress
- Boi-1da, Grammy Award-winning hip hop producer
- Munro Chambers, actor
- Jesse Colburn, guitarist
- Karena Evans, actress, director
- Natasha Fatah, Canadian journalist
- Glenn Healy, former NHL player and commentator
- Cory Joseph, Canadian basketball player and NBA champion
- Devoe Joseph, professional basketball player
- Sara Kaljuvee, Olympic bronze medalist for Rugby Sevens
- Alex Laurier (Alex Eftimoff), children's entertainer
- Nichelle Prince, Canadian women's soccer player
- Eon Sinclair, musician
- Mark Spicoluk, musician
- T-Minus, hip hop record producer

== Athletics ==
Pickering High School has a long history of athletic competition at the regional and provincial levels. The school offers a variety of sports through its athletic programs, including badminton, curling, golf, mountain biking, Nordic skiing, rugby, swimming, track and field, ultimate frisbee, volleyball, and other sports. The school's athletic teams compete in the Lake Ontario Secondary School Athletics (LOSSA) region and in provincial competitions organized by the Ontario Federation of School Athletic Associations (OFSAA). The school has won provincial championships in several sports, including volleyball, rugby, football, basketball, soccer, and wrestling.

=== Basketball ===
The Pickering High School boys' basketball program has been particularly successful at the provincial level. The team won consecutive OFSAA championships in 2007 and 2008. The 2007 and 2008 championship teams included brothers Cory Joseph and Devoe Joseph, who later pursued professional basketball careers. Cory Joseph went on to play in the National Basketball Association (NBA), while Devoe Joseph played professionally in several leagues.

Pickering won another OFSAA boys' basketball championship in 2025.

=== Football ===
Pickering High School has a long-standing football program and has been one of the successful high school football programs in the Durham Region. The Pickering Trojans have won multiple Lake Ontario Secondary School Athletics (LOSSA) championships in both junior and senior football. In 2005, the senior team won the LOSSA championship and advanced to the Metro Bowl finals after finishing the regular season with a 10–0 record. The school also won the 2005 OFSAA Golden Horseshoe Bowl. The junior program has likewise achieved success, including a tenth LOSSA junior football championship.

=== OFSAA championships ===
Pickering High School has won multiple OFSAA championships dating back to 1965. Its provincial championship teams have competed in sports including boys' volleyball, boys' rugby, boys' football, boys' basketball, girls' soccer, and girls' wrestling.

- 1965 Boys' Volleyball
- 1986 Boys' Rugby
- 1990 Boys' Rugby
- 2005 Boys' Football (Golden Horseshoe Bowl)
- 2007 Boys' Basketball
- 2008 Boys' Basketball
- 2013 Girls' Soccer
- 2017 Girls' Wrestling
- 2025 Boys' Basketball

=== Track-and-Field ===
Pickering High School has a long-standing track and field program that has achieved considerable success at the provincial level. The school has won numerous OFSAA team championships in boys', girls', and combined competition and has won more OFSAA track and field team championships than any other school in OFSAA history. Under longtime coach Cyril Sahadath, the Pickering High School track and field team won 13 OFSAA team championships during his 25 years at the school. Sahadath was recognized for his contributions to athletics and coaching in the Durham Region.

The school's OFSAA track and field championships include:

- 1987 Junior Boys
- 1991 Overall Boys
- 1992 Senior Boys
- 1997 Overall Boys
- 1998 Midget Boys
- 1998 Overall
- 2002 Midget Boys
- 2002 Overall Boys
- 2003 Junior Boys
- 2007 Midget Girls
- 2007 Overall Combined Co-Ed
- 2007 Overall Girls
- 2008 Midget Boys
- 2009 Junior Boys
- 2009 Overall Boys
- 2009 Overall Combined Co-Ed
- 2009 Overall Girls
- 2010 Overall Boys
- 2010 Overall Combined Co-Ed
- 2010 Overall Girls
- 2012 Overall Boys
- 2014 Overall Boys
- 2016 Overall Combined Co-Ed
- 2023 Overall Girls

=== Notable coaches ===
- Jens Kraemer – former Canadian national soccer team player and longtime Pickering High School coach. Kraemer earned three-time OUAA/CIAU All-Star honours and was inducted into the Western Mustangs Hall of Fame in 2008.
- John Martini – former Canadian Football League player and longtime Pickering High School football coach. Martini coached the school's football team to multiple LOSSA championships and the 2005 Metro Bowl championship.
- Ron Parfitt – longtime basketball coach and educator who coached at Pickering High School for 32 years. He led the school's senior boys' basketball program to multiple championships, including its first OFSAA title in 2007.
- Cyril Sahadath – longtime track and field coach who worked at Pickering High School for 25 years and led the school's track and field team to 13 OFSAA team championships.
- Stan Tzogas – wrestling coach at Pickering High School and longtime coach with Team Impact Wrestling Club. He has coached at the Olympic Games and multiple senior World Championships and has played a major role in Wrestling Canada's high-performance program.

== News stories ==
- 2002 sawed-off rifle incident:In January 2002, a 16-year-old student retrieved a sawed-off rifle after an altercation in the cafeteria and fired it in the school's lobby. The incident resulted in criminal proceedings and received local media coverage.
- 2019 Women's Soccer: Pickering alumnus Nichelle Prince was featured in national coverage while representing Canada at the 2019 FIFA Women's World Cup. The coverage also discussed her time at Pickering High School and her success as a student athlete.
- 2026 National Photography Championship: Pickering High School student Ethan Geng won gold at the Skills Canada National Competition after previously winning the provincial competition, making him the only DDSB representative on Team Ontario at the national event.

== Feeder schools ==
Located in Ajax, Ontario

- Alexander Graham Bell Public School
- Cadarakque Public School
- Eagle Ridge Public School
- Lincoln Alexander Public School
- Lincoln Avenue Public School
- Michaëlle Jean Public School
- Vimy Ridge Public School
- Westney Heights Public School
- Roland Michener Public School
- Applecroft Public School
- Rosemary Brown Public School

Located in Pickering, Ontario

- Frenchman's Bay Public School
- William Dunbar Public School

== See also ==
- Education in Ontario
- List of secondary schools in Ontario
