= Cucumber (Canadian TV series) =

Canadian TV series

Cucumber is a TV show produced by TVOntario in 1975, and repeated regularly throughout the 1970s and 1980s during TVOntario's daytime kids' programming block.

The show's title was an acronym for Children's Underground Club of United Moose and Beaver for Enthusiastic Reporters. It featured a human-sized moose (played in costume by Alex Laurier) and beaver (Nikki Tilroe) living in a treehouse, and acting as amateur journalists as they present various educational segments on topics such as science or history. Segments were keyed to Ontario's elementary school curriculum, so that the show could be used as a teaching tool in schools.

By sending in a story or some artwork to the show (the mailing address was in Toronto), one could become a member of the Cucumber Club.

== Guest stars ==
Some notable people appeared on the show:

- John Candy guest starred as a character named Weatherman
- Martin Short guest starred as a character named Smokey the Hare
- An interview featured a nine-year-old Jeff Healey.
