= Math Patrol =

Canadian children's television series

Math Patrol was a children's educational television show produced by TVOntario from 1976 to 1978 and aired by the public broadcaster in the late 1970s and the early 1980s.

The series starred John Kozak as "Sydney" – a "math detective" who repeatedly went undercover as a kangaroo ("the only disguise Math Patrol had that would fit him"). Other cast members included Carl Banas, Jessica Booker, Luba Goy and Nikki Tilroe.

Producer/Director Clive Vanderburgh, Production Assistant Jane Downey and Editor Brian Elston.

The program was designed to teach basic math skills and terminology in an entertaining fashion to children between approximately 8 and 10 years of age. In each 15-minute episode, Math Patrol's unseen (silhouetted) boss "Mr. Big" would send the detective on a case or charge him with a task which could only be solved through mathematic deduction.

Over the course of 20 episodes, Math Patrol provided introductory math lessons on topics including addition, subtraction, multiplication, division, area, fractions, length, shapes, geometry and symmetry.

Because of its highly educational nature, Math Patrol was often shown to groups of primary school students. A 1990 survey of Ontario teachers found that approximately 30% of primary teachers used Math Patrol and Readalong during class.
