= One Canadian: The Political Memoirs of the Rt. Hon. John G. Diefenbaker =

1976 Canadian TV series

- Genre: Biographical documentary
- Written by: Munroe Scott
- Directed by: Munroe Scott
- Starring: John Diefenbaker
- Composer: Herbert Helbig
- Country of origin: Canada
- Original language: English
- No. of seasons: 1
- No. of episodes: 13

Production
- Executive producer: Cameron Graham

Original release
- Network: CBC Television
- Release: 6 October 1976 – 6 January 1977

Related
- First Person Singular: Pearson – The Memoirs of a Prime Minister

One Canadian: The Political Memoirs of the Rt. Hon. John G. Diefenbaker is a Canadian biographical documentary television miniseries that aired on CBC Television from 1976 to 1977.

== Premise ==
John Munro filmed more than nine hours of interviews with former Canadian Prime Minister John Diefenbaker in late 1974. Episodes included this footage combined with historic photographs and other film footage of Diefenbaker. As a memoir, the series provided little critical examination of Diefenbaker's political career.

== Production ==
Douglas Rain supplied narration in place of the actual interviewers such as Thomas Van Dusen. Wilfred Doucette was the director of photography. Herbert Helbig composed the music, and the title theme was performed by the Canadian Brass.

== Scheduling ==
This half-hour series was broadcast on Wednesdays at 8:30 p.m. from 6 October 1976 to 6 January 1977.

== Episodes ==
- 1, 2: childhood and early legal career
- 3, 4: political career since 1919, to his 1940 election to the House of Commons of Canada after a series of unsuccessful election attempts, until his 1956 election as leader of the Progressive Conservative Party
- 5 to 11: from opposition leader to election as Prime Minister, then his return to opposition
- 12: loss of the Progressive Conservative party leadership in 1967
- 13: Diefenbaker's summary of his career and observations on government
