= Dear Aunt Agnes =

- Genre: Comedy drama
- Starring: Heather Conkie; Mya Rimon; Bradley Phillips; Bruce Tubbé; Elias Zarou; Rachael Crawford
- Country of origin: Canada
- Original language: English
- No. of seasons: 3
- No. of episodes: 39

Production
- Executive producer: Ruth Vernon
- Producer: Heather Conkie
- Production locations: Toronto, Ontario
- Running time: 30 Minutes

Original release
- Network: TV Ontario
- Release: January 7, 1986 – December 27, 1989

Dear Aunt Agnes is a Canadian television comedy-drama series that aired on TV Ontario from January 1986 to December 1989. It was filmed in Toronto, Ontario, and ran for three seasons.

== Cast ==
=== Main cast ===
- Heather Conkie - Agnes Peabody
- Mya Rimon - Alex Stefanidis
- Bradley Phillips - Andrew Stefanidis
- Bruce Tubbé - Gary Hutchins

=== Recurring Characters ===
- Elias Zarou - Mr. Stefanidis
- Rachael Crawford - Marsha

== Plot Background ==
Teenage Alex and her younger brother Andrew live in Toronto, and are the children of divorced parents. In the series debut, their mother has just departed on a temporary assignment to the Canadian embassy in Senegal, and her Aunt Agnes arrives to look after the two children in her absence. Also part of the household is a boarder Gary, who studies sociology at the local university.

The series focuses on a variety of challenges young people routinely find themselves dealing with - peer pressure, divorce, single-parent households, and questioning their own & others' values.

== Production ==
Dear Aunt Agnes was created at a time when TV Ontario (TVO) was looking to expand programming for pre-teens. During its research phase, the network discovered a demand for shows that could help young people deal with critical real-life situations in effective ways. At the time, educators around the province reported the number children from separated families was increasing, and requested programming that might help these young people cope with the anxieties and challenges of living apart from one or both parents.

The Agnes Peabody character had been developed by Heather Conkie in an earlier TVO series It's Mainly Music, and was popular with viewers. In creating the new show, both Conkie and executive producer Ruth Vernon thought this character might have the right mix of oddball fun and wisdom to be both appealing to audiences, and also effective as a guardian and mentor to her two young relatives. Conkie (who also produced the show, wrote some episodes and composed the theme music) said: "Agnes doesn't have the supreme right to say 'yes' or 'no' to the children, as a parent would. So they are free to test things out on their own and question adult values".

Although initially aimed at 8-12 year olds, the show also became a hit with parents. By the end of the second season, it was TVO's highest ever rated show in the early evening timeslot. But ratings success was not a priority for the public broadcaster and its primary sponsor: a sharp drop in Ontario government grants in 1987 reduced the network's budgets, and forced the series' cancellation after only two seasons. Viewers flooded the network with calls and letters protesting the decision, with some threatening to withhold their financial support until new episodes were aired. As a network that relied partly on viewer donations, TVO was able to reverse the decision and produced a third season in 1989 after a one year hiatus. The new batch of episodes featured Alex and Andrew facing challenges of teenagers, rather than young adolescents.

Filming was done primarily on a TVO set, with outdoor locations filmed around Toronto's Rosedale, Forest Hill, and Summerhill neighbourhoods, and the University of Toronto campus. The family house shown in the opening credits is located at 121 Crescent Road in Toronto, and was owned at the time by Conkie.

== Broadcast ==
The series ran from January 1986 to December 1989, and episodes were re-run until September 1993. Since then, TVO has not made any episodes available to the public. A very limited number of episodes from other shows were released on TVO's Public Archive streaming site in 2011, but the cost of obtaining rebroadcast rights from actors, writers, and composers has resulted in the archive project focusing more on current events programs than dramas.

== Episode guide ==
Episode #	Date	Title	Description
1.1	7 Jan 1986	Crossed Signals	Alex and Andrew don't like the idea of their great-aunt Agnes looking after them.
1.2	14 Jan 1986	Cover-Up	Alex covers up for Andrew when he gets in trouble.
1.3	21 Jan 1986	Fair Play	Alex sneaks downtown; Gary cheats on an essay deadline.
1.4	28 Jan 1986	Be Real	The children's father announces a visit on his birthday.
1.5	4 Feb 1986	The Best of Friends	Marsha hangs around with an older crowd.
1.6	11 Feb 1986	Moon Motel	Andrew finds he has misjudged his partner on the science project.
1.7	18 Feb 1986	The Visit	Andrew and Alex learn their father might marry.
1.8	25 Feb 1986	Battlezone	Gary and Agnes fight over the local election campaign.
1.9	4 Mar 1986	Popularity Game	Agnes encourages Gary. Andrew and Alex resist peer pressure.
1.10	11 Mar 1986	Wrong Route	Unable to handle his paper route, Andrew enlists the aid of others.
1.11	18 Mar 1986	Educating Agnes	Agnes becomes friends with old man Taylor, and is shocked to discover he is dying.
1.12	25 Mar 1986	Trouble with Travino	Alex loses a part in the school play; Andrew get a low grade on a geography project.
1.13	1 Apr 1986	Nobody's Fault	Elizabeth comes to visit; Andrew suffers a serious accident.
2.1	20 Jan 1987	Getting Even	A lesson to handle the school's bully gets Andrew into a much bigger battle.
2.2	27 Jan 1987	The New Neighbour	Andrew and his friend Steve play detective in order to track down missing bicycles from the neighbourhood.
2.3	3 Feb 1987	A Matter of Honour	Gary falls in love with his best friend's girlfriend, and Alex is suspicious about a package and its contents.
2.4	10 Feb 1987	Sisters in Spirit	Alex and Marsha meet a frightened young girl and later on discover that she needs help because of an unbearable family life.
2.5	17 Feb 1987	In a Fog	Things go awry for Alex and Andrew when they're left alone for a day while Aunt Agnes is on vacation.
2.6	24 Feb 1987	Job Hunting	Gary ignores Aunt Agnes' advice after he encounters a series of rejections in his job search.
2.7	3 Mar 1987	Tam Lin	An immigrant Vietnamese girl, scheduled for heart surgery, comes to live with the family.
2.8	10 Mar 1987	The Date	Alex's first date throws the household into a turmoil.
2.9	17 Mar 1987	Money Matters	Borrowing, spending and a mistaken debt present special problems for Alex, Gary and Andrew.
2.10	24 Mar 1987	Burnout	Alex and Andrew's mother arrives on a surprise visit from Africa.
2.11	31 Mar 1987	Standing on Ceremonies	When Aunt Agnes is left out, Alex and Andrew refuse to attend their father's marriage; Gary has a problem with the two girls he invited to his graduation.
2.12	7 Apr 1987	Opportunity Knocks	Exaggerated skills on a job application and participation in a protest demonstration make Alex and Gary reluctant to go to their respective job interviews.
2.13	14 Apr 1987	Body Beautiful	Alex, Andrew and Gary treat Aunt Agnes to a day at the beauty salon for her birthday.
3.1	4 Oct 1989	The Homecoming	Alex and Andrew return from France.
3.2	11 Oct 1989	A Question of Vanity	Alex and Andrew's bickering hinders busy Aunt Agnes.
3.3	18 Oct 1989	Fallen Idol	A wealthy boy moves into the neighbourhood.
3.4	25 Oct 1989	Dancing on Thin Ice	Alex thinks her ballerina friend has bulimia.
3.5	1 Nov 1989	The Crush	Alex develops a crush on a teacher.
3.6	8 Nov 1989	Gary's Driving School	Gary gives Alex driving lessons.
3.7	15 Nov 1989	Doing Good	Alex becomes a candy striper.
3.8	22 Nov 1989	Schultz's Dad	Alex discovers a friend's father is an alcoholic.
3.9	29 Nov 1989	Andrew in Love	Andrew's crush on the director complicates a school play.
3.10	6 Dec 1989	Home, Sweet Homeless	Schultz runs away from home and his father's problem.
3.11	13 Dec 1989	Bazaar Situation	
3.12	20 Dec 1989	Christmas at Loon Lake	Aunt Agnes gives Alex and Andrew an old-fashioned Christmas at her family cottage.
3.13	27 Dec 1989	Future Plans	Alex, Andrew and Aunt Agnes plan to go separate ways.
