= Nikki Tilroe =

American actress and puppeteer (1941–2005)

- Tilroe in her role as the Mime Lady on Today's Special
- Born: Nicole Ann Agee; December 26, 1941; Los Angeles, California, U.S.
- Died: September 1, 2005 (aged 63); Derry, New Hampshire, U.S.
- Occupations: Actress, dancer, puppeteer
- Years active: 1950–2002
- Spouse: Robert Dunning Tilroe (m. 1963)

Nikki Tilroe (born Nicole Ann Agee; December 26, 1941 – September 1, 2005) was an American actress, dancer and puppeteer. She is best known for her work as the "Mime Lady" on the children's television series Today's Special. She also operated Muppets on Fraggle Rock and played "Beaver" on Cucumber.

Tilroe worked out of Los Angeles during 1950s and 1960s, Tilroe married Robert Dunning Tilroe in August 25, 1963, and Toronto during the 1970s and 1980s, and served as director for Frog Print Theater. In 1975 Tilroe was awarded a "Citation of Excellence in the Art of Puppetry" by Jim Henson. In 1993 she received an Emmy Award as the head puppeteer on the production of The Land of I.

Tilroe appeared on the children's television show Charlie Horse Music Pizza, and was one of three puppeteers to manipulate the "Snuggle Bear", a puppet designed by Kermit Love. Tilroe also taught puppetry courses through several venues, including the University of Hawaiʻi, the Toronto Teacher's College, at festivals and conferences, and through the O'Neill Puppetry Conference. She also wrote about puppetry, including the 1996 booklet, Movement in puppetry performance.

Tilroe worked on the web-produced puppet films for Sammy Snail, and in 2004 she received a grant from The Jim Henson Foundation for a production called Aging, produced with Larry Siegel through Tricinium Limited in Keene, New Hampshire.

Tilroe died aged 63 at her home in Derry, New Hampshire on September 1, 2005. She had been suffering from liver and kidney diseases. Her remains were cremated and ashes gave final disposition burial at Elmwood Cemetery at Glenmont, New York on December 6, 2016. In November 2005, the two movies Friday Night Brights (DVD release film, November 24, 2005) and Escape from Octopus Shores (TV Film, November 27, 2005) were released as posthumous releases.

In 2007, the O'Neill Puppetry Conference recognized Tilroe's contribution to puppetry by providing a scholarship in her name. The Nikki Tilroe Scholarship is supported by her family and friends and it is awarded to candidates with a particular interest in "movement and dedication to the art of puppetry".

== Filmography ==
- Cucumber (1972) - Beaver, Ecology
- Math Patrol (1977)
- Today's Special: Live on Stage (1981) - Many characters
- Follow That Bird (1985) - Board of Birds
- The Christmas Toy (1986) - Ding-a-Ling
- Today's Special (1981–86) - Mime Lady
- Fraggle Rock (1983–87) - Merple Merggle
- The Wubbulous World of Dr. Seuss (1996) (Episode: The Simplifier)
- Water from the Moon (2002)
