= Report Canada =

Canadian children's television series

Report Canada is a 1978 Canadian television children's program hosted by Heather Conkie, which was modeled after a news program. Conkie sat at a desk in front of a big map of Canada, and provided historical, geographical, and social information about the country. The show also featured drawings or posters that were sent in by viewers. The program was aired on TVOntario; it succeeded an earlier show that was also hosted by Conkie, and which was called Report Metric, that helped to teach children the metric system, to which Canada was converting at the time.
