= Someday I'll Find You =

1930 song written by Noël Coward

"Someday I'll Find You" (sometimes printed as "Some Day I'll Find You") (Note: Coward was inconsistent about the title of the song: in his Collected Sketches and Lyrics (1932) and his Song Book (1953) it is "Some Day I'll Find You"; In The Lyrics of Noël Coward (1965) it is "Someday I'll Find You". The text of Private Lives, first published in 1930, does not include the title or words of the song and merely says "The orchestra downstairs strikes up a new melody. ... It is a sentimental, romantic little tune", and in Act 2 "They sing several old refrains from dead and gone musical comedies finishing with the song that brought them together again in the first Act". The song was published separately by the music publishers Chappell & Co. as "Someday I'll Find You", also in 1930.) is a song with words and music by Noël Coward. It was introduced by Gertrude Lawrence and Coward in his 1930 play Private Lives. The song has been recorded by various singers and was later used as the theme for the radio drama Mr. Keen, Tracer of Lost Persons.

== Description ==
It is played repeatedly by the hotel orchestra in the play, before being sung by the character Amanda and subsequently reprised in Act 2 by Elyot and Amanda. The song is a waltz and is written in the key of E-flat major.

Coward wrote of the song:

"Some Day I'll Find You" was written as a theme song for Private Lives. Gertrude Lawrence sang a refrain of it alone in the first act and in the second we sang it together. ... [A]mong my sentimental songs [it] ranks next in popularity to "I'll See You Again" and, now that Gertie is no longer alive, I find the nostalgia of it almost unbearable.

In his 1992 book Noel and Cole, Stephen Citron describes the song as encapsulating the whole theme of the play of Private Lives. The musicologists Marvin E. Paymer and Don Post describe "Someday I'll Find You" as "broadly romantic and unabashedly sentimental" and argue that the development of the melody of the song is impressive, particularly as Coward could neither read nor write music. The singer Ian Bostridge has commented, "Elyot (played by Coward himself in the first production) famously scorns the song as a 'nasty insistent little tune'; but it is Amanda who has the measure of its power and its importance in the drama they are playing out: 'Extraordinary how potent cheap music is'". (Note: In the 1930 His Master's Voice recording of scenes from the play, Lawrence delivers the line as "Strange how potent cheap music is", and Coward adopted this wording for a 1944 revival of the play and changed the line accordingly in the printed version of the text published at the time.)

"Someday I'll Find You" was the theme for the radio drama Mr. Keen, Tracer of Lost Persons, which ran from 1937 to 1955 on NBC Blue and CBS.

== Recordings ==
Between the pre-London tour of Private Lives and the West End premiere on 24 September 1930, Coward and Lawrence made studio recordings of scenes from Acts 1 and 2 of the play for the Gramophone Company, recorded at the Queen's Hall (upstairs in the Small Queen's Hall), London, on 15 September and released on the His Master's Voice label with the catalogue number C 2043. Ray Noble and his orchestra provided the musical accompaniment for "Someday I'll Find You".

Lawrence made a second recording of the song, released on Decca DL 5418 in 1952. The orchestra was conducted by Jay Blackton.

Coward made a studio recording of the song for the Philips label, with orchestral accompaniment conducted by Wally Stott, released with the catalogue number 8028. The following year his live cabaret performance of the song in the opening medley was included on the Columbia record Noël Coward at Las Vegas, ML 5063. Carlton Hayes and his orchestra provided the accompaniment.

Others who have recorded the song include Hilde Gueden, Mario Lanza, Doris Day, Bobby Short, Patricia Routledge, Perry Como, Julie Andrews and Ian Bostridge.
