= I'll See You Again =

1929 Noël Coward song

"I'll See You Again" is a song by the English songwriter Sir Noël Coward.

It originated in Coward's 1929 operetta Bitter Sweet, but soon became established as a standard in its own right and remains one of Coward's best-known compositions. He told how the waltz theme had suddenly emerged from a mix of car-horns and klaxons during a traffic-jam in New York.

The song has been covered by a wide range of singers and groups, including Jeanette MacDonald, Nelson Eddy, Hildegarde, Mario Lanza, Carmen McRae, Rosemary Clooney, Eddie Fisher, Vera Lynn, Bryan Ferry, Bob and Alf Pearson, Keith Jarrett and the Pasadena Roof Orchestra.

Anna Moffo and Sergio Franchi recorded the song in duet on the 1963 RCA Victor Red Seal Album The Dream Duet. It was memorably arranged by Axel Stordahl for Frank Sinatra's final Capitol Records album, Point of No Return.
