= Roderick Cook =

English playwright, writer and actor (1932–1990)

- Born: 9 February 1932; London, England
- Died: 17 August 1990 (aged 58); Los Angeles, California, United States
- Occupations: Playwright, theatre director, actor
- Years active: 1954–1990

Roderick Cook (9 February 1932 – 17 August 1990) was an English playwright, writer, theatre director and actor of stage, television and film. Cook is known for creating, directing and starring in the musical review Oh, Coward! and portraying Count Von Strack in the Oscar-winning film Amadeus.

== Career ==
Cook attended Queens' College, Cambridge, graduating in 1953, and then began his career appearing in plays at London's West End during the 1950s. He made his professional stage debut in 1954 as Feste in Twelfth Night; a production directed by Peter Hall. That same year, he worked under Hall again in the English language premiere of Waiting for Godot by Samuel Beckett at the Arts Theatre, London. He also starred alongside Maggie Smith in the original 1954 production of Listen to the Wind at the Oxford Playhouse. Cook worked with Smith again in the original 1957 production of Share My Lettuce at the Lyric Theatre, Hammersmith. In 1956, Cook worked under Hall's direction as Gaston in the English language premiere of The Waltz of the Toreadors at London's Arts Theatre where he played opposite Hugh Griffith and Beatrix Lehmann. In 1957, he appeared in the ill-fated musical Zuleika at the Saville Theatre.

Cook made his first film appearance in the 1959 British film Idle on Parade. Two years later, he made his first television appearance as a guest star on the series Jango followed by work on the series No Hiding Place. Shortly thereafter, he emigrated to the United States, making his Broadway debut as Lord Neville in the 1961 musical Kean. He returned to Broadway two years later to portray Peter Northbrook in Noël Coward's 1963 musical The Girl Who Came to Supper followed by the role of Edward in the 1964 play Roar Like a Dove. In February 1965, Cook began writing book reviews and poetry for Harper's Magazine. He wrote nineteen entries for the magazine over the next two years, with his last entry appearing in the November 1967 issue. In 1969, Cook returned to Broadway when he replaced Alec McCowen as Fr. William Rolfe in Hadrian the Seventh. That same year, he portrayed the role of Scrivens in the original cast of James Saunders' A Scent of Flowers at the Martinique Theatre.

In the late 1960s, Cook began appearing sporadically in American television appearing on such programmes as the Hallmark Hall of Fame (1967), One Life to Live (1968) and Lotsa Luck (1973). He also appeared in several films during the 1970s including Our Time (1974), The Great Waldo Pepper (1975) and Girlfriends (1978).

On the stage, Cook remained active off-Broadway and in regional theatre productions during the 1970s, but did not appear in a single Broadway show during the decade. His greatest success came from Oh, Coward!, a musical revue that Cook devised himself on the life and works of Noël Coward. The production premiered off-Broadway on 4 October 1972 and was one of the last Noël Coward shows staged during Coward's lifetime. Cook directed and starred in the show which ran for a total of 294 performances. The show then proceeded to tour the United States and Britain over the next several years in London, Los Angeles, Chicago, Washington, D.C., and San Francisco among other cities. His other stage credits during this time include Ernest in Design for Living opposite Maggie Smith at the Ahmanson Theatre and Lincoln Center (1971) and the Devil in Don Juan in Hell at the Alley Theatre (1979). Cook also worked as a director on several productions in the 1970s, including directing Peter O'Toole in both Present Laughter and Uncle Vanya in 1978.

In 1980, Cook returned to Broadway to portray Beverly Carlton in the revival of The Man Who Came to Dinner. For his performance, he received a Drama Desk Award nomination for Outstanding Featured Actor in a Play. That same year he devised a musical revue of the works of William Roy, entitled Special Delivery, that premiered at the Oakland West Dinner Theatre in Lauderdale Lakes, Florida. In 1981, Cook returned to Broadway as Gerald in the 1981 musical Woman of the Year, a role he played for two years. In 1982, he directed Tom Ziegler's The Ninth Step at the Riverwest Theatre in New York City. In 1987, he received a Tony Award nomination for his role in the original Broadway cast of Oh Coward!, a production which he also directed.

During the 1980s, Cook remained active in television with his work consisting of such series as One Life to Live (1983), All My Children (1985), Newhart (1988), Sledge Hammer! (1988), MacGyver (1988), Tattingers (1989) and Tales from the Crypt (aired posthumously in 1992) among others. He also portrayed Count Von Strack in the film Amadeus (1984) and Von Klammer in Garbo Talks (also 1984). His other film credits include Silent Madness (1984), 9½ Weeks (1986), Spellbinder (1988) and A More Perfect Union (1989).

Cook died of a heart attack on 17 August 1990 in Los Angeles.

== Filmography ==
| Year | Title | Role | Notes |
|---|---|---|---|
| 1959 | Idol on Parade | Nobby | |
| 1974 | Our Time | Headmaster | |
| 1975 | The Great Waldo Pepper | Werfel | |
| 1978 | Girlfriends | Simon Carpel | |
| 1984 | Amadeus | Count Von Strack | |
| 1984 | Garbo Talks | Von Klammer | |
| 1984 | Silent Madness | Dr. Kruger | |
| 1986 | 9½ Weeks | Sinclair - the Critic | |
| 1988 | Spellbinder | Ed Kennerle | |
| 1989 | A More Perfect Union | Nathaniel Gorham | |

== Sources ==
- "Roderick Cook, Actor On Stage, Dead at 58". The New York Times. 19 August 1990.
- Biography of Roderick Cook at Music Theatre International
- Biography of Roderick Cook at filmreference.com
