= Mad Dogs and Englishmen (song) =

Song composed by Noël Coward

Romney Brent sings "Mad Dogs and Englishmen", Words and Music, 1932

"Mad Dogs and Englishmen" is a song written by Noël Coward and first performed in The Third Little Show at the Music Box Theatre, New York, on 1 June 1931, by Beatrice Lillie. The following year it was used in the revue Words and Music and also released in a "studio version". It then became a signature feature in Coward's cabaret act.

The song's title refers to its refrain, "Mad dogs and Englishmen go out in the midday sun." The saying "Only mad dogs and Englishmen go out in the midday sun" is often asserted to have been coined by Rudyard Kipling describing the naiveté of English people regarding the effect of daytime heat in tropical climates, but no precise source is ever cited. The song begins with the first 10 notes of "Rule Britannia". This song is considered a patter song, because the lyrics are mostly spoken rather than sung. One of the memorable lines in the first chorus is "But Englishmen detest a siesta".

According to Sheridan Morley, Coward wrote the song while driving from Hanoi to Saigon "without pen, paper, or piano". Coward himself elucidated: "I wrestled in my mind with the complicated rhythms and rhymes of the song until finally it was complete, without even the aid of pencil and paper. I sang it triumphantly and unaccompanied to my travelling companion on the verandah of a small jungle guest house. Not only Jeffrey [Amherst], but the gecko lizards and the tree frogs gave every vocal indication of enthusiasm".

== Lyrics ==
In tropical climes there are certain times of day
When all the citizens retire,
to tear their clothes off and perspire.
It's one of those rules that the biggest fools obey,
Because the sun is much too sultry and one must avoid
its ultry-violet ray --
Papalaka-papalaka-papalaka-boo. (Repeat)
Digariga-digariga-digariga-doo. (Repeat)
The natives grieve when the white men leave their huts,
Because they're obviously, absolutely nuts --

Mad dogs and Englishmen go out in the midday sun.
The Japanese don't care to, the Chinese wouldn't dare to,
Hindus and Argentines sleep firmly from twelve to one,
But Englishmen detest a siesta,
In the Philippines there are lovely screens,
to protect you from the glare,
In the Malay states there are hats like plates,
which the Britishers won't wear,
At twelve noon the natives swoon, and
no further work is done -
But Mad Dogs and Englishmen go out in the midday sun.

It's such a surprise for the Eastern eyes to see,
That though the British are effete,
they're quite impervious to heat,
When the white man rides, every native hides in glee,
Because the simple creatures hope he will
impale his solar topee on a tree.
Bolyboly-bolyboly-bolyboly-baa. (Repeat)
Habaninny-habaninny-habaninny-haa. (Repeat)
It seems such a shame that when the English claim the earth
That they give rise to such hilarity and mirth -

Mad Dogs and Englishmen go out in the midday sun.
The toughest Burmese bandit can never understand it.
In Rangoon the heat of noon is just what the natives shun.
They put their scotch or rye down, and lie down.
In the jungle town where the sun beats down,
to the rage of man or beast,
The English garb of the English sahib merely gets a bit more creased.
In Bangkok, at twelve o'clock, they foam at the mouth and run,
But mad dogs and Englishmen go out in the midday sun.

Mad Dogs and Englishmen, go out in the midday sun.
The smallest Malay rabbit deplores this stupid habit.
In Hong Kong, they strike a gong, and fire off a noonday gun.
To reprimand each inmate, who's in late.
In the mangrove swamps where the python romps
there is peace from twelve till two.
Even caribous lie down and snooze, for there's nothing else to do.
In Bengal, to move at all, is seldom if ever done,
But mad dogs and Englishmen go out in the midday sun.

== The Noonday Gun ==
The lines

In Hong Kong, they strike a gong, and fire off a noonday gun
To reprimand each inmate who's in late

refer to the Noonday Gun opposite the Excelsior Hotel in Hong Kong, which is still fired every day at noon by a member of Jardines. In 1968, Coward visited Hong Kong and fired the gun.

== Churchill and Roosevelt ==
Coward wrote, "In Words and Music Romney Brent sang it as a missionary in one of Britain's tropical colonies. Since then I have sung it myself ad nauseam. On one occasion it achieved international significance. This was a dinner party given by Mr Winston Churchill on board HMS Prince of Wales in honour of President Franklin D. Roosevelt on the evening following the signing of the Atlantic Charter. From an eye-witness description of the scene it appears that the two world leaders became involved in a heated argument as to whether 'In Bangkok at twelve o'clock they foam at the mouth and run' came at the end of the first refrain or at the end of the second. President Roosevelt held firmly to the latter view and refused to budge even under the impact of Churchillian rhetoric. In this he was right and when, a little later, I asked Mr Churchill about the incident, he admitted defeat like a man."

== Cultural references ==
- The song is performed in episode 216 of The Muppet Show from 1977.
- The song is performed in Ten Little Indians (1989 film).
- A 2013 episode of Tom Kapinos' Californication is also named after the song.
- Mad Dogs and Englishmen (film) is a 1995 drama film starring Elizabeth Hurley and C. Thomas Howell.
- Mad Dogs & Englishmen was a National Review podcast by Charles C. W. Cooke and Kevin D. Williamson.
