= Eastern Commerce Collegiate Institute =

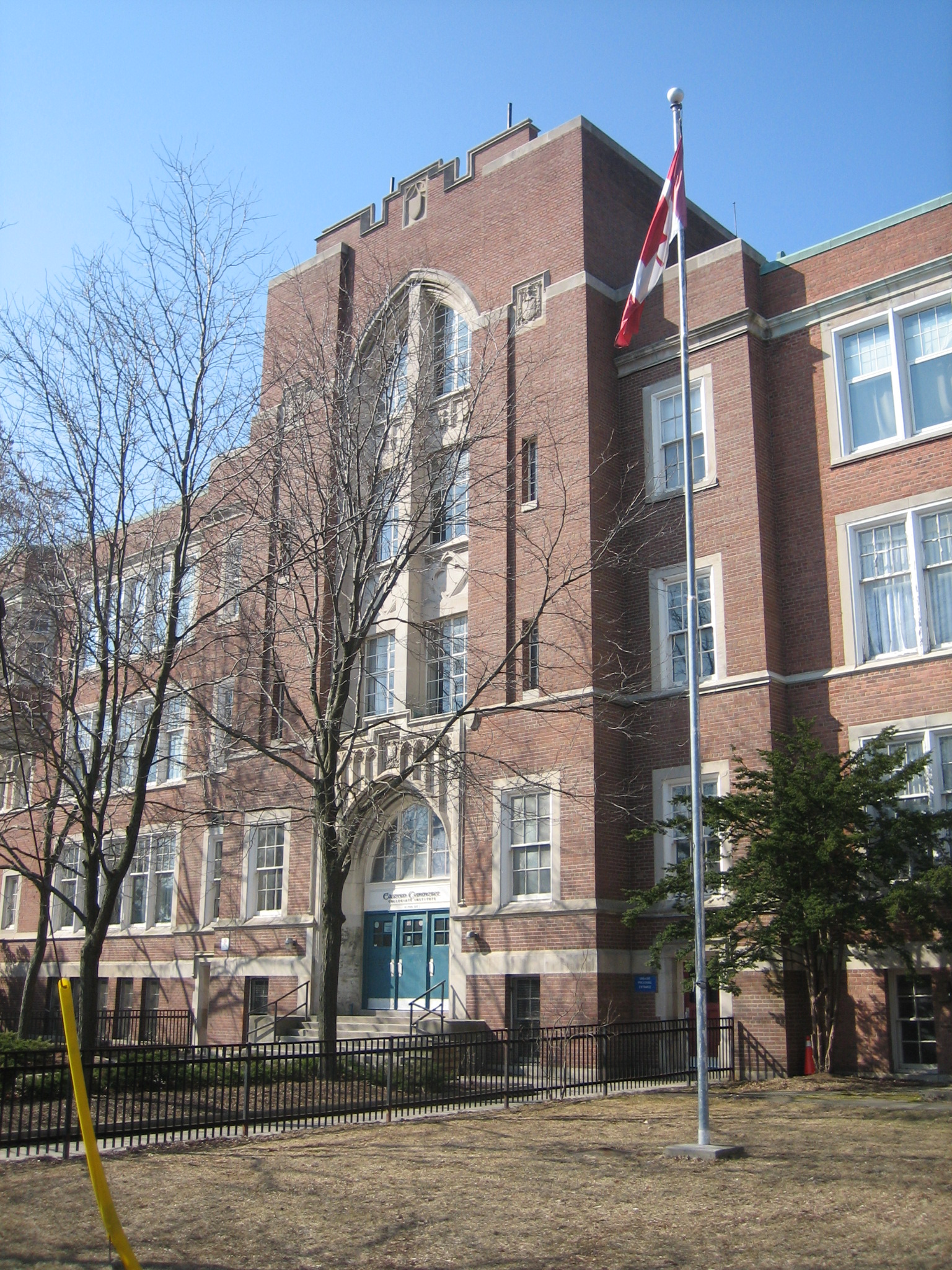

Location
- 16 Phin Avenue; Toronto, Ontario, M4J 3T2; Canada; 43.679266°N 79.336409°W

Information
- School type: High school
- Motto: Enter to Learn, Go Forth to Serve.
- Founded: 1925
- Closed: 2015
- School board: Toronto District School Board
- Superintendent: Mike Gallagher
- Area trustee: Jennifer Story
- Principal: Jennifer Chan
- Grades: 10-12
- Enrollment: 199+
- Language: English, French
- Schedule type: Semestered
- Colours: Red, Black, and White
- Team name: Saints
- Website: schools.tdsb.on.ca/easterncomm

Eastern Commerce Collegiate Institute (ECCI) was a public high school part of Toronto District School Board in Toronto, Ontario, Canada. It was originally named the Eastern High School of Commerce.

Opened in 1925, it offered a range of courses leading to all Ministry pathways: University, college, Apprenticeship, and Workplace. Co-operative Education is an integral part of the curriculum.

The school offered a Specialist High Skills Major in Business and Marketing, The National Retail Business Certificate, and an internationally recognized Computer Licence Certificate. In 2002, the department won the Kenneth Fryer Award for mathematics teaching.

The school attracted enrollment to students from all parts of Toronto due to its proximity to Donlands station. Since the school's closure in 2015, the building still hosts Subway Academy I, the First Nations School and the TDSB Historical and Archival Records.

== History ==
The school opened in 1924 and was designed by architect Charles Edmund Cyril Dyson. The school closed down in June 2015. The school was also a set for “FlashPoint” Flashpoint (TV series) a television program about Metropolitan Police's Strategic Response Unit, an elite and highly skilled group of cops, who work to save lives in Toronto, Ontario, Canada. Originally aired in 2008 and ended in 2012, with 5 seasons. Season 2 episode 7 titled “perfect storm“ used Eastern Commerce Collegiate Institute in 2009 as set and can be seen throughout the entire episode. https://www.imdb.com/title/tt1421126/

== Notable alumni ==
- Aaron Best (basketball) Professional basketball player
- Jamaal Magloire Drafted 19th overall in the 2000 NBA draft

== See also ==
- List of high schools in Ontario
