= 1955 in music =

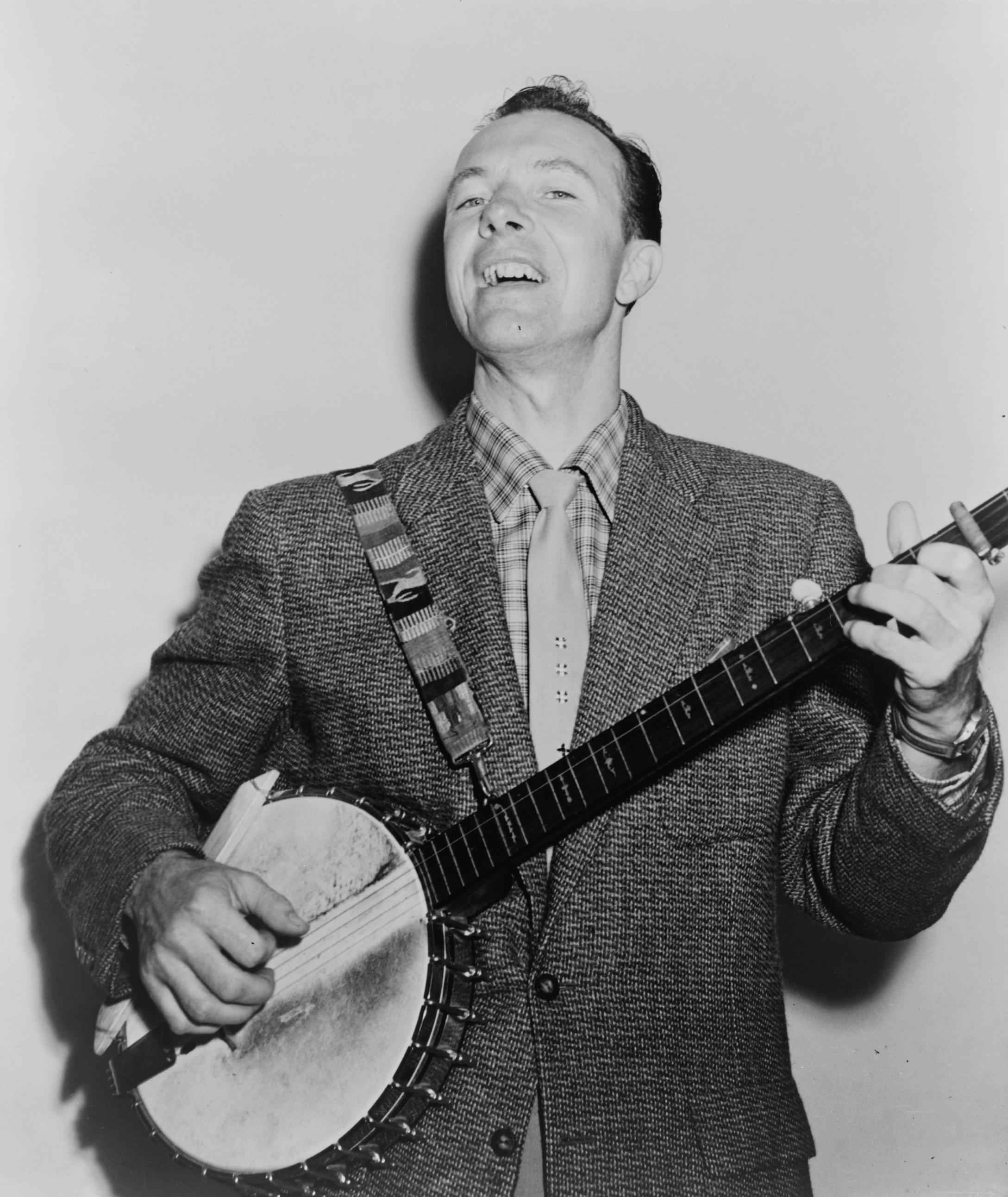
Pete Seeger in 1955

This is a list of notable events in music that took place in the year 1955.

== Specific locations ==
- 1955 in British music
- 1955 in Norwegian music

== Specific genres ==
- 1955 in country music
- 1955 in jazz

== Events ==
- January 1 – RCA Victor announces a marketing plan called "Operation TNT." The label drops the list price on LPs from $5.95 to $3.98, EPs from $4.95 to $2.98, 45 EPs from $1.58 to $1.49 and 45's from $1.16 to $.89. Other record labels follow RCA's lead and begin to drop prices as well.
- January 7
  - Marian Anderson is the first African American singer to perform at the Metropolitan Opera in New York City.
  - "Rock Around the Clock" by Bill Haley & His Comets first appears on the British charts.
- January 14 – In New York City, Alan Freed produces the first rock and roll concert.
- January 27 – Michael Tippett's opera The Midsummer Marriage is premiered at the Royal Opera House, Covent Garden in London, conducted by John Pritchard, with designs by Barbara Hepworth and choreography by John Cranko; it arouses controversy.
- February 19 – Dot Records introduces a new singer, Pat Boone, with an advertisement in Billboard magazine calling him "a great new voice". His first record for Dot Records is "Two Hearts, Two Kisses, One Love."
- February 24 – Carlisle Floyd's opera Susannah is premiered in the Ruby Diamond Auditorium of Florida State University, Tallahassee with Phyllis Curtin in the title role.
- February 26 – For the first time since their introduction in 1949, 45 rpm discs begin to outsell standard 78s.
- February – Kay Starr leaves Capitol to sign with RCA.
- March 3 – Italian soprano Mirella Freni makes her operatic debut as Micaëla in Carmen at the Teatro Municipale in her native Modena.
- March 7 – The Broadway production of Peter Pan, starring Mary Martin, is presented on American television for the first time by NBC-TV with its original cast, as an installment of Producers' Showcase. It is also the first time that a stage musical is presented in its entirety on TV almost exactly as it was performed on stage. This program gains the largest viewership of a TV special up to this time and becomes one of the first great TV family musical classics.
- March 15 – Colonel Tom Parker becomes Elvis Presley's de facto manager.
- March 19 – The film Blackboard Jungle is premièred in New York City, featuring Bill Haley & His Comets' "Rock Around the Clock" over the opening credits, the first use of a rock and roll song in a major film.
- March 22 – Decca Records signs DJ Alan Freed as an A&R man.
- March 26 – Bill Hayes tops the US charts for five weeks with "The Ballad of Davy Crockett" and starts a (fake) coonskin cap craze.
- April 14 – Imperial Records in the United States release "Ain't That a Shame" by Fats Domino (co-written with Dave Bartholomew). It reaches #1 in the R&B chart and becomes over time a million seller, bringing Domino to prominence and giving his work covers by white artists: Pat Boone makes this song a Billboard number-one single of 1955 for jukebox play.
- May 13 – First riot at an Elvis Presley concert takes place in Jacksonville, Florida.
- May 21 – Chuck Berry records his first single, "Maybellene", for Chess Records in Chicago.
- May 22 – Bridgeport, Connecticut, authorities cancel a rock concert to be headlined by Fats Domino for fear of a riot breaking out.
- June
  - The 29th International Society for Contemporary Music Festival takes place in Baden-Baden.
  - The newly formed Netherlands Chamber Orchestra gives its first performance at the Holland Festival.
- June 2 – Italian singers Natalino Otto and Flo Sandon's marry.
- June 16 – Glenn Gould completes his recording of Bach's Goldberg Variations.
- June 18
  - English singers Pearl Carr and Teddy Johnson marry.
  - Pierre Boulez's influential composition Le marteau sans maître ("The hammer without a master"), for contralto and six instrumentalists, is premiered (in its first revised version) at the International Society for Contemporary Music Festival in Baden-Baden at the insistence of Heinrich Strobel.
- July 9 – "Rock Around the Clock" becomes the first Rock and roll single to reach Number One on the American charts.
- July 13 – The Beaux Arts Trio make their debut at the Berkshire Music Festival.
- August 8 – Luigi Nono marries Arnold Schoenberg's daughter Nuria in Venice.
- August 19 – WINS radio station in New York City adopts a policy of not playing white cover versions of black R&B songs.
- August 31 – A Londoner is fined for "creating an abominable noise" for playing "Shake, Rattle, and Roll" at top volume.
- September 3 – Little Richard records "Tutti Frutti" in New Orleans with significantly cleaned up lyrics (originally "Tutti Frutti, good booty" among other things); it is released in October.
- September 26 – "America's Sweethearts", singers Eddie Fisher and Debbie Reynolds, marry.
- October 15 – Elvis Presley plays a concert in Lubbock, Texas. Opening act is local duo Buddy and Bob, Buddy being future rock star Buddy Holly.
- October 20 – Disc jockey Bill Randle of WERE (Cleveland) is the key presenter of a concert at Brooklyn High School (Ohio), featuring Pat Boone and Bill Haley & His Comets and opening with Elvis Presley, not only Elvis's first performance north of the Mason–Dixon line, but also his first filmed performance, for a documentary on Randle titled The Pied Piper of Cleveland.
- October 29 – Dmitri Shostakovich's Violin Concerto No. 1, originally completed in 1948, is premiered by the Leningrad Philharmonic Orchestra with its dedicatee, David Oistrakh, as soloist.
- November 4 – William Schuman's orchestral piece Credendum: Article of Faith, commissioned by UNESCO, is premiered in Cincinnati.
- November 12 – Billboard magazine DJ poll names Elvis Presley as the most promising new country and western singer.
- November 20 – Bo Diddley makes his debut TV appearance on The Ed Sullivan Show on CBS television.
- November 22 – Colonel Tom Parker signs Elvis Presley to RCA Records.
- November 29 – Juan José Castro conducts the UK première of Carlos Chávez's Symphony No. 3 at the Maida Vale Studios with the London Symphony Orchestra.
- December 15 – Sun Records releases "Folsom Prison Blues" recorded by Johnny Cash on July 30.
- Christmas – The Temperance Seven is founded as a jazz band, initially comprising three members from the Chelsea School of Art in London.
- Paul Simon and Art Garfunkel write their first song, "The Girl For Me" (copyrighted with the Library of Congress in 1956), and begin singing together as a duo while still in high school in New York City.
- Nine-year-old Al Green forms a gospel quartet, the Green Brothers.
- Clyde McPhatter launches a solo career.
- Renato Carosone and Nicola Salerno meet and start their songwriting partnership.
- Astor Piazzolla, returning to Argentina from his studies with Nadia Boulanger, forms his string orchestra (Orquesta de Cuerdas) and octet (Octeto Buenos Aires) and introduces the nuevo tango style.
- Indian santoor player Shivkumar Sharma gives his first public performance in Bombay.
- Etta James makes her debut with "The Wallflower (Dance with Me, Henry)" which tops the R&B Chart but is considered too risqué for pop radio. The song is subsequently covered by Georgia Gibbs in a sanitized version where the line "Roll with me Henry" is changed to "Dance with me Henry"
- Publication of Neue Mozart-Ausgabe begins.

== Albums released ==
In 1955, 1,615 albums and 4,542 pop singles were released in the US.

- And I Thought About You – Patti Page
- At the Cafe Bohemia, Vol. 1 – The Jazz Messengers
- At the Cafe Bohemia, Vol. 2 – The Jazz Messengers
- Day Dreams – Doris Day
- Blue Moods – Miles Davis
- Brute Force Steel Bands of Antigua, B.W.I.
- Christmas with Patti Page – Patti Page
- Clifford Brown with Strings – Clifford Brown
- Cloud 7 – Tony Bennett
- Concert by the Sea – Erroll Garner
- Dinner in Caracas – Aldemaro Romero
- Doris Day in Hollywood – Doris Day
- Eddie Fisher Sings Academy Award Winning Songs – Eddie Fisher
- Especially for You... – Teresa Brewer
- Four Brothers – Ames Brothers
- Happy Holiday – Jo Stafford
- The Hi-Lo's, I Presume – The Hi-Lo's
- I Cry for You – Johnnie Ray
- I Love You – Eddie Fisher
- In a Blue Mood – Kay Starr
- In a Romantic Mood – Oscar Peterson
- In the Land of Hi-Fi – Sarah Vaughan
- In the Wee Small Hours – Frank Sinatra
- Jazz Spectacular – Frankie Laine & Buck Clayton
- Julie Is Her Name – Julie London
- Love Me or Leave Me – Doris Day
- Lovers' Laine – Frankie Laine
- Mamborama – Tito Puente
- Meet Betty Carter and Ray Bryant – Betty Carter and Ray Bryant
- Memory Songs – Jo Stafford
- Moments to Remember – The Four Lads
- Music Ala Carte – The Crew-Cuts
- The Musings of Miles – Miles Davis
- Noël Coward at Las Vegas – Noël Coward
- Oklahoma! – Original Broadway Cast
- Oscar Peterson Plays Count Basie – Oscar Peterson
- The One, the Only Kay Starr – Kay Starr
- Quintet/Sextet – Miles Davis
- Rain or Shine – Dick Haymes
- Rock Around the Clock – Bill Haley & His Comets
- Rock with Bill Haley and the Comets – Bill Haley & His Comets
- Romance on the Range – Patti Page
- Satch Plays Fats – Louis Armstrong
- Shake, Rattle and Roll – Bill Haley & His Comets
- So Smooth – Perry Como
- Soft and Sentimental – Jo Stafford
- Songs of Scotland – Jo Stafford
- Songs from Pete Kelly's Blues – Peggy Lee, Ella Fitzgerald
- Starring Sammy Davis Jr. – Sammy Davis Jr.
- Study in Brown – Clifford Brown and Max Roach
- Swingin' Down Yonder – Dean Martin
- Symphony No. 10 (Shostakovich) – Philharmonic-Symphony Orchestra of New York, Dimitri Mitropoulos, conductor (12-inch LP. Columbia Masterworks ML 4959)
- Thelonious Monk Plays Duke Ellington – Thelonious Monk
- Voice of our Choice – Guy Mitchell
- The Waltz Queen – Patti Page

== Biggest hit singles ==
The following singles achieved the highest chart positions in the set of charts available for 1955.

#	Artist	Title	Year	Country	Chart Entries
1	Bill Haley & His Comets	Rock Around the Clock	1955	US	UK 1 – Jan 1955 (36 weeks), US Billboard 1 – May 1955 (24 weeks), US BB 1 of 1955, US CashBox 1 – Jul 1954 (31 weeks), Your Hit Parade 1 of 1955, Record Mirror 1 for 8 weeks – Nov 1955, Australia 1 for 6 weeks – Aug 1955, Germany 1 for 4 weeks – Jun 1956, UK sales 1 of the 1950s (1,390 k in 1955), Grammy Hall of Fame in 1982 (1954), DDD 1 of 1954, POP 1 of 1955, DZE 1 of 1955, Flanders 2 – Nov 1955 (14 months), RYM 2 of 1954, DMDB 2 (1954), Italy 3 of 1957, UKMIX 3, nuTsie 3 of 1950s, Brazil 4 of 1956, Europe 5 of the 1950s (1955), D.Marsh 7 of 1955, Scrobulate 8 of rock & roll, RIAA 12, Germany 17 – Jun 1968 (2 months), Holland 27 – Jun 1968 (5 weeks), Belgium 30 – Jun 1974 (1 week), 41 in 2FM list, Acclaimed 49 (1954), AFI 50, Rolling Stone 158, Global 4 (20 M sold) – 1954, one of the Rock and Roll Hall of Fame 500, Party 180 of 1999
2	Tennessee Ernie Ford	Sixteen Tons	1955	US	UK 1 – Jan 1956 (11 weeks), US Billboard 1 – Nov 1955 (22 weeks), US CashBox 1 – Nov 1955 (21 weeks), Record Mirror 1 for 5 weeks – Jan 1956, Australia 1 for 6 weeks – Feb 1956, Grammy Hall of Fame in 1998 (1955), DZE 2 of 1955, Flanders 3 – Jan 1956 (7 months), Brazil 7 of 1956, D.Marsh 12 of 1955, RYM 13 of 1955, US BB 20 of 1955, POP 20 of 1955, DDD 49 of 1955, RIAA 83, DMDB 88 (1955), Acclaimed 276 (1955), UKMIX 933
3	The Platters	Only You (And You Alone)	1955	US	Italy 1 of 1957, France 1 for 13 weeks – Nov 1957, Grammy Hall of Fame in 1999 (1955), US CashBox 3 – Aug 1955 (26 weeks), US BB 4 of 1955, Brazil 4 of 1957, POP 4 of 1955, UK 5 – Sep 1956 (16 weeks), US Billboard 5 – Sep 1955 (22 weeks), D.Marsh 10 of 1955, DDD 12 of 1955, RYM 15 of 1955, Europe 22 of the 1950s (1955), nuTsie 88 of 1950s, Acclaimed 643 (1955), Party 271 of 1999
4	Pérez Prado	Cherry Pink (and Apple Blossom White)	1955	US	UK 1 – Mar 1955 (17 weeks), US Billboard 1 – Mar 1955 (26 weeks), Australia 1 for 3 weeks – Jul 1955, Germany 1 for 7 weeks – Oct 1955, US CashBox 2 – Mar 1955 (29 weeks), Flanders 2 – Apr 1955 (5 months), Your Hit Parade 3 of 1955, Brazil 4 of 1955, US BB 7 of 1955, POP 7 of 1955, RYM 27 of 1955, DDD 68 of 1955, UKMIX 188
5	Four Aces	Love is a Many Splendoured Thing	1955	US	US Billboard 1 – Aug 1955 (21 weeks), US CashBox 1 – Aug 1955 (29 weeks), Radio Luxembourg sheet music 1 for 1 week – Jan 1956, Oscar in 1955 (film 'Love is a Many Splendored Thing'), UK 2 – Nov 1955 (13 weeks), Peel list 2 of 1955, Italy 3 of 1956, DZE 3 of 1955, US BB 9 of 1955, POP 9 of 1955, Flanders 13 – Dec 1955 (3 months), RYM 29 of 1955, UKMIX 550

== US No. 1 hit singles ==
These singles reached the top of US Billboard magazine's charts in 1955.

First week	Number of weeks	Title	Artist
January 22, 1955	2	"Let Me Go, Lover!"	Joan Weber
February 5, 1955	1	"Hearts of Stone"	The Fontane Sisters
February 12, 1955	6	"Sincerely"	The McGuire Sisters
March 26, 1955	5	"The Ballad of Davy Crockett"	Bill Hayes
April 30, 1955	10	"Cherry Pink and Apple Blossom White"	Pérez Prado
July 9, 1955	8	"Rock Around the Clock"	Bill Haley & His Comets
September 3, 1955	5	"The Yellow Rose of Texas"	Mitch Miller
October 8, 1955	1	"Love Is a Many-Splendored Thing"	The Four Aces
October 15, 1955	1	"The Yellow Rose of Texas"	Mitch Miller
October 22, 1955	1	"Love Is a Many-Splendored Thing"	The Four Aces
October 29, 1955	4	"Autumn Leaves"	Roger Williams
November 26, 1955	7	"Sixteen Tons"	Tennessee Ernie Ford

== Top hits on record ==
- "Adorable" - The Drifters
- "Ain't That A Shame" – Pat Boone
- "Arrivederci Roma" – Georgia Gibbs
- "Baby Let's Play House" – Elvis Presley
- "Band Of Gold" – Don Cherry
- "A Blossom Fell" / "If I May" – Nat King Cole
- "The Crazy Otto Medley" – Johnny Maddox
- "Cherry Pink And Apple Blossom White" – Pérez Prado
- "Cool Water" – Frankie Laine
- "Croce Di Oro" – Patti Page
- "Cry Me a River" – Julie London
- "Danger! Heartbreak Ahead" – Jaye P. Morgan
- "Darling, Je Vous Aime Beaucoup" – Nat King Cole
- "Der Mond hält seine Wacht" – Peter Alexander
- "Earth Angel" – The Crew-Cuts
- "Gum Drop" – The Crew-Cuts
- "The Great Pretender" – The Platters
- "Hawkeye" – Frankie Laine
- "He", recorded by
  - Al Hibbler
  - McGuire Sisters
- "Heart" – Eddie Fisher
- "Honey-Babe" – Art Mooney and His Orchestra
- "How Important Can It Be?" – Joni James
- "Hummingbird", recorded by
  - Frankie Laine
  - Les Paul and Mary Ford
- "I Hear You Knocking" – Gale Storm
- "I Need You Now" – Eddie Fisher
- "I Want You to Be My Baby" – Georgia Gibbs
- "If I Give My Heart to You", recorded by
  - Doris Day
  - Denise Lor
- "In The Beginning" – Frankie Laine
- "It's A Sin To Tell A Lie" – Somethin' Smith and the Redheads
- "Learnin' the Blues" – Frank Sinatra
- "Let Me Go, Lover!" – Joan Weber
- "Let's Go Fishin'" – Frankie Laine & Jimmy Boyd
- "Love Is A Many-Splendored Thing" – The Four Aces featuring Al Alberts
- "Love Me or Leave Me" – Doris Day
- "Maybellene" – Chuck Berry
- "Melody of Love" – Billy Vaughn
- "Mera Joota Hai Japani" – Mukesh
- "Memories Are Made Of This" – Dean Martin
- "Moments to Remember" – The Four Lads
- "My Friend" – Frankie Laine
- "Never Look Back" – Doris Day
- "Only You (And You Alone)" – The Platters
- "Playmates" – The Fontane Sisters
- "Rock Around the Clock" – Bill Haley & His Comets
- "Rock And Roll Waltz" – Kay Starr
- "Rock Island Line" – Lonnie Donegan
- "Same Old Saturday Night" – Frank Sinatra
- "Seventeen", recorded by
  - Boyd Bennett and His Rockets
  - The Fontane Sisters
- "Sincerely" – McGuire Sisters (also in 1954)
- "Sixteen Tons", recorded by
  - Tennessee Ernie Ford
  - Frankie Laine
- "Smack Dab In The Middle" – The Mills Brothers
- "Sur ma vie" – Charles Aznavour
- "Speedoo" – The Cadillacs
- "Stars Fell On Alabama" – Frankie Laine & Buck Clayton
- "Steamboat" - The Drifters
- "Suddenly There's A Valley" – Gogi Grant
- "Teen Age Prayer", recorded by
  - Gale Storm
  - Gloria Mann
- "That Old Feeling", recorded by
  - Frankie Laine & Buck Clayton
  - Patti Page
- "That's All I Want from You" – Jaye P. Morgan
- "Unchained Melody", recorded by
  - Les Baxter
  - Roy Hamilton
  - Al Hibbler
  - Jimmy Young
- "Vecchio Frac – Domenico Modugno
- "The Wallflower"- Etta James
- "What'cha Gonna Do" - Clyde McPhatter and The Drifters
- "A Woman in Love" – Frankie Laine
- "The Yellow Rose Of Texas" – Mitch Miller & The Gang
- "You Are My Love" – Joni James

== Top R&B and country hits on record ==
- "Ain't That a Shame" – Fats Domino
- "Close Your Eyes" – The Five Keys
- "Earth Angel" – The Penguins
- "Flip, Flop and Fly" – Big Joe Turner
- "Lonely Nights" – The Hearts
- "Love Love Love" – Webb Pierce
- "Silver Threads and Golden Needles" – Wanda Jackson
- "Tutti Frutti" – Little Richard
- "Tweedle Dee" – LaVern Baker
- "The Wallflower" – Etta James
- "At My Front Door" – The El Dorados

== Published popular music ==
- "Ain't That a Shame" – w.m. Fats Domino and Dave Bartholomew
- "Ain't That Lovin' You Baby" – w.m. Jimmy Reed
- "Arrivederci Roma" – w. (Eng) Carl Sigman m. Renato Ranucci
- "Ballad Of Davy Crockett" – w. Tom Blackburn m. George Bruns
- "Band of Gold" – w. Bob Musel m. Jack Taylor
- "The Bible Tells Me So" – w.m. Dale Evans
- "Black Denim Trousers And Motorcycle Boots" – w.m. Jerry Leiber and Mike Stoller
- "Blue Monday" – w.m. Fats Domino and Dave Bartholomew
- "Blue Star" w. Edward Heyman m. Victor Young
- "Blue Suede Shoes" – w.m. Carl Perkins
- "Bo Diddley" – w.m. Ellas McDaniel
- "Charlie Brown" – w.m. Jerry Leiber and Mike Stoller
- "Christmas Alphabet" – Buddy Kaye, Jules Loman
- "Dance with Me, Henry" – w.m. Johnny Otis, Hank Ballard and Etta James aka "Wallflower"
- "Day-O (The Banana Boat Song)" – trad West Indies arr. William Attaway and Irving Burgie (aka Lord Burgess)
- "Domani" – w. Tony Velona m. Ulpio Minucci
- "Don't Be Angry" – w.m. Nappy Brown, Rose Marie McCoy and Fred Mendelsohn
- "Dreamboat" – w.m. Jack Hoffman
- "Dungaree Doll" – w. Ben Raleigh m. Sherman Edwards
- "En Tu Reja" – m. Aldemaro Romero, arranged for accordion quartet by John Serry Sr.
- "Folsom Prison Blues" – w.m. Johnny Cash
- "Forever Darling" w. Sammy Cahn m. Bronislau Kaper. Introduced by Desi Arnaz in the 1956 film Forever, Darling
- "The Great Pretender" – w.m. Buck Ram
- "Hallelujah I Love Her So" – w.m. Ray Charles
- "He" – w. Richard Mullan m. Jack Richards
- "He's a Tramp" w.m. Peggy Lee and Sonny Burke. Introduced by Peggy Lee in the animated film Lady and the Tramp
- "Heart" – w.m. Richard Adler and Jerry Ross
- "Hey, Mister Banjo" – w.m. Freddy Morgan and Norman Malkin
- "I Hear You Knocking" – w.m. Dave Bartholomew and Pearl King
- "Holiday in Rio" – m. Terig Tucci arranged for accordion quartet by John Serry Sr.
- "I Never Has Seen Snow" – w. Truman Capote and Harold Arlen m. Harold Arlen
- "I'll Never Stop Loving You" w. Sammy Cahn m. Nicholas Brodszky. Introduced by Doris Day in the film Love Me or Leave Me.
- "I'm in Love Again" – w.m. Fats Dominio and Dave Bartholomew
- "In the Wee Small Hours of the Morning" w. Bob Hilliard m. Dave Mann
- "Innamorata" – w. Jack Brooks m. Harry Warren Introduced by Dean Martin in the film Artists and Models
- "It's Almost Tomorrow" – w. Wade Buff m. Gene Adkinson
- "Jamaica Farewell" – w.m. Lord Burgess
- "Jim Dandy" – w.m. Lincoln Chase
- "Ko Ko Mo (I Love You So)" – w.m. Forest Wilson, Jake Porter and Eunice Levy
- "Learnin' The Blues" – w.m. Dolores Vicki Silvers
- "Life Could Not Better Be" – w.m. Sylvia Fine and Sammy Cahn. Introduced by Danny Kaye in the film The Court Jester.
- "Little One (1956 song)" – w.m. Cole Porter
- "Love and Marriage" – w. Sammy Cahn m. Jimmy Van Heusen
- "Love Is a Many-Splendored Thing" – w. Paul Francis Webster m. Sammy Fain
- "Monolas" – m. Manolo Escobar, arranged for accordion quartet by John Serry Sr.
- "Maybellene" – w.m. Chuck Berry, Russ Frato and Alan Freed
- "Memories Are Made of This" – w.m. Terry Gilkyson, Rich Dehr and Frank Miller
- "Mind if I Make Love to You?" – w.m. Cole Porter
- "Moments To Remember" – w. Al Stillman m. Robert Allen
- "Mr. Wonderful" – w.m. Jerry Bock, George David Weiss and Larry Holofcener
- "My Boy – Flat Top" – w.m. Boyd Bennett and John Young Jr
- "No, Not Much" – w. Al Stillman m. Robert Allen
- "Once-a-Year Day" – w.m. Richard Adler and Jerry Ross from the musical The Pajama Game
- "Paper Roses" – w. Janice Torre m. Fred Spielman
- "Pete Kelly's Blues" – w. Sammy Cahn m. Ray Heindorf
- "Relax-Ay-Voo" – Sammy Cahn and Arthur Schwartz
- "Robin Hood" w.m. Carl Sigman. Theme song of the Television series starring Richard Greene.
- "The Rock and Roll Waltz" – w. Dick Ware m. Shorty Allen
- "Rock-A-Beatin' Boogie" – w.m. Bill Haley
- "See You Later Alligator" – w.m. Robert Guidry
- "The Siamese Cat Song" – w.m. Peggy Lee and Sonny Burke. Introduced by Peggy Lee in the animated film Lady and the Tramp.
- "A Sleepin' Bee" – w. Truman Capote and Harold Arlen m. Harold Arlen. Introduced in the musical House of Flowers by Diahann Carroll, Ada Moore, Dolores Harper and Enid Mosier
- "Smokey Joe's Cafe" – w.m. Jerry Leiber and Mike Stoller
- "Softly, Softly" – Pierre Dudan, Paddy Roberts and Mark Paul
- "Something's Gotta Give" – w.m. Johnny Mercer. Introduced by Fred Astaire in the musical film Daddy Long Legs.
- "Speedoo" – w.m. Esther Navarro
- "A Story Untold" – Leroy Griffin
- "Suddenly There's a Valley" – w.m. Chuck Meyer and Biff Jones
- "Tango Verde" – m. Aldemaro Romero, arranger John Serry Sr. for accordion quartet
- "(Love Is) The Tender Trap" w. Sammy Cahn m. Jimmy Van Heusen. Introduced by Frank Sinatra in the film The Tender Trap.
- "Theme from East Of Eden" – m. Leonard Rosenman
- "Tina Marie" – w.m. Bob Merrill
- "Tutti Frutti" – w.m. Richard Penniman, D. La Bostrie and Joe Lubin
- "Unchained Melody" – w. Hy Zaret m. Alex North
- "Wake the Town and Tell the People" – w. Sammy Gallop m. Jerry Livingston
- "The Wallflower" (aka "Dance With Me Henry") – w.m. Johnny Otis, Hank Ballard and Etta James
- "Whatever Lola Wants" – w.m. Richard Adler and Jerry Ross. Introduced by Gwen Verdon in the musical Damn Yankees. Gwen also performed the song in the 1958 film version.
- "Why Do Fools Fall in Love" – w.m. Frankie Lymon and George Goldner
- "A Woman in Love" – w.m. Frank Loesser
- "You Are My Love" – w.m. Jimmie Nabbie
- "You Don't Know Me" – w.m. Cindy Walker and Eddy Arnold

== Other notable songs ==
- "Mera Joota Hai Japani" by Shankar-Jaikishan
- "Moscow Nights" by Vasily Solovyov-Sedoy and Mikhail Matusovsky
- "Satumaa" by Unto Mononen

== Classical music ==
=== Premieres ===
Sortable table
Composer	Composition	Date	Location	Performers
Berio, Luciano	Mimusique No. 2	1955-10-25	Bergamo, Italy	Albertini, Cacciari, Carpi, Chazalettes, Consonni, Nogara, Pistone, Ridoni, Tortorella, Zovianoff – Maderna
Blacher, Boris	Viola Concerto	1955-03-14	Cologne, Germany	Wolf / ? – Sawallisch
Bliss, Sir Arthur	Meditation on a Theme by John Blow (orchestral)	1955-12-13	Birmingham, UK (Town Hall)	City of Birmingham Symphony – Rudolf Schwarz
Bliss, Sir Arthur	Violin Concerto	1955-05-11	London, UK	London Symphony – Sargent
Boulez, Pierre	Le Marteau sans maître	1955-08-16	Baden-Baden, Germany	Plate / members of SWF Symphony – Rosbaud
Boulez, Pierre	Sonatine for flute and piano	1955-06-01	Darmstadt, Germany (Ferienkurse)	Redel, Loriod
Enescu, George	Chamber Symphony, Op. 33	1955-01-23	Paris	Association of Chamber Music Concerts of Paris – Obradous
Engelmann, Hans Ulrich	Atlantische Ballade for soprano, baritone, and string quartet	1955-06-01	Darmstadt, Germany (Ferienkurse)	Stix, Rehfuss, Drolc Quartet
Finzi, Gerald	Cello Concerto	1955-07-19	Cheltenham, UK (Festival)	Bunting / Hallé Orchestra – Barbirolli
Fricker, Peter Racine	Three Movements for viola solo	1955-06-01	Darmstadt, Germany (Ferienkurse)	Zug
Gerhard, Roberto	Symphony No. 1	1955-06-21	Baden-Baden, Germany (ISCM Festival)	SWF Symphony – Rosbaud
Hanson, Howard	Sinfonia sacra (Symphony No. 5)	1955-02-18	Philadelphia, US	Philadelphia Orchestra – Ormandy
Heiss, Hermann	Sinfonia giocosa	1955-06-04	Darmstadt, Germany (Ferienkurse)	Landestheater-Orchester Darmstadt – Sanzogno
Helm, Everett B.	Eight minutes for two pianos	1955-06-01	Darmstadt, Germany (Ferienkurse)	Seemann, Schröter
Hovhaness, Alan	Symphony No. 2, Mysterious Mountain	1955-10-31	Houston, US	Houston Symphony – Stokowski
Klebe, Giselher	Sonata No. 2 for solo violin, Op. 20	1955-06-01	Darmstadt, Germany (Ferienkurse)	Kolisch
Leibowitz, René	Concerto for viola and chamber orchestra	1955-06-04	Darmstadt, Germany (Ferienkurse)	Mann / Landestheater-Orchester Darmstadt – Sanzogno
Lutoslawski, Witold	Dance Preludes for clarinet and piano (Note: A second version for clarinet and chamber orchestra is recorded this year by Alojcy Szulc and the Polish National Radio Symphony conducted by Jan Krenz, though it does not receive a concert premiere until the 1963 Aldeburgh Festival.)	1955-02-15	Warsaw, Poland	Kurkiewicz, Nadgryzowski
Maderna, Bruno	String Quartet	1955-06-01	Darmstadt, Germany (Ferienkurse)	Drolc Quartet
Martinů, Bohuslav	Fantaisies symphoniques (Symphony No. 6)	1955-01-05	Boston, US	Boston Symphony – Munch
Milhaud, Darius	Symphony No. 6	1955-10-07	Boston, US	Boston Symphony – Munch
Milhaud, Darius	Symphony No. 7	1955-09-13	Venice, Italy (Biennale)	INR Orchestra – André
Montsalvatge, Xavier	Calidoscopi simfònic	1955-05-06	Barcelona, Spain	Barcelona Municipal Orchestra – Toldrà
Nono, Luigi	Canti per tredici	1955-03-26	Paris	Domaine Musical – Boulez
Nono, Luigi	Incontri	1955-05-30	Darmstadt, Germany (Ferienkurse)	SWF Symphony – Rosbaud
Piston, Walter	Symphony No. 6	1955-11-25	Boston, US	Boston Symphony – Munch
Rodrigo, Joaquín	Pavana real, ballet	1955-12-19	Barcelona, Spain	Liceu Symphony – Sardó
Sauguet, Henri	Symphony No. 3, I.N.R.	1955-09-13	Venice, Italy (Biennale)	Belgian Radio Orchestra – André
Schuman, William	Credendum	1955-11-04	Cincinnati, US	Cincinnati Symphony – Johnson
Shostakovich, Dmitri	From Jewish Folk Poetry (1948)	1955-01-15	Leningrad, Russia	Dorliak, Dolukhanova, Maslennikov, Shostakovich
Shostakovich, Dmitri	Violin Concerto No. 1	1955-10-29	Leningrad, Russia	Oistrakh / Leningrad Philharmonic – Mravinsky
Stockhausen, Karlheinz	Klavierstücke VI–VIII (Note: Official premieres. In fact, Klavierstücke VII and VIII had been performed already by David Tudor in New York on 15 December 1954. Mercenier claimed not to have performed VI at all, though a recording of the performance in the Darmstadt archives includes a truncated version of it, as well as a failed attempt at VII disrupted by a sustained audience disturbance after three pages. After an intervention by Luigi Nono. Mercenier made a second attempt to perform the piece, but was once again obliged to stop when she could not hear what she was playing because of the audience uproar.)	1955-06-01	Darmstadt, Germany (Ferienkurse)	Mercenier
Tansman, Alexandre	Concerto for Orchestra	1955-09-13	Venice, Italy (Biennale)	Belgian Radio Orchestra – André
Tippett, Michael	Sonata for Four Horns	1955-12-20	London, UK	Dennis Brain Wind Ensemble
Toch, Ernst	Symphony No. 3 – [1956 Pulitzer]	1955-12-02	Pittsburgh, US	Pittsburgh Symphony – Steinberg
Togni, Camillo	Helian for soprano and piano	1955-06-01	Darmstadt, Germany (Ferienkurse)	Stix, Togni
Tubin, Eduard	Symphony No. 6	1955-09-30	Stockholm, Sweden	Swedish Radio Symphony – Mann
Villa-Lobos, Heitor	Cello Concerto No. 2	1955-02-05	New York City	Parisot / New York Philharmonic – Hendl
Villa-Lobos, Heitor	Harp Concerto	1955-01-14	Philadelphia, US	Zabaleta / Philadelphia Orchestra – Villa-Lobos
Waxman, Franz	Sinfonietta for Strings and Timpani	1955-10-30	Zürich, Switzerland	Zurich Radio Symphony – Liebermann
Xenakis, Iannis	Metastaseis	1955-10-16	Donaueschingen, Germany (Musiktage)	SWF Symphony – Rosbaud
Zimmermann, Bernd Alois	Perspektiven for two pianos	1955-06-01	Darmstadt, Germany (Ferienkurse)	Rossmann, Maderna

=== Compositions ===
- Milton Babbitt – Sonnets (2), for baritone voice, clarinet, viola and cello
- Jean Barraqué – Séquence
- Luciano Berio
  - Mimusique No. 2 for orchestra
  - Mutazione for tape
  - Quartetto
  - Variazione for chamber orchestra
- Arthur Bliss
  - Meditations on a Theme by John Blow, Op. 118
  - Violin Concerto, Op. 111
- Ernest Bloch – Proclamation, B.91
- Pierre Boulez – Le Marteau sans maître
- York Bowen – Rhapsody for Viola and Piano in G Minor
- Mario Castelnuovo-Tedesco
  - Tre Preludi mediterranei, Op. 176
  - Escarramán, Op. 177
- Eric Coates – The Dam Busters March
- Henry Cowell – Symphony No. 12
- George Crumb
  - Diptych for orchestra
  - Sonata for solo cello
- Mario Davidovsky
  - Quintet for Clarinet and Strings
  - Suite Sinfonica Para "El Payaso" for orchestra
- Einar Englund – Piano Concerto No. 1
- Ferenc Farkas – Bukki Varlatok
- Gerald Finzi – Cello Concerto
- Henryk Mikołaj Górecki –
  - Four Preludes, Op. 1
  - Toccata, Op. 2, for two pianos
- Camargo Guarnieri
  - Poemas afro-brasileiros (3), for voice and orchestra
  - Ponteios, vol. 3, for piano
  - Sonata No. 2, for cello and piano
  - Songs (2), for voice and piano
- Howard Hanson – Symphony No. 5, Op. 43, Sinfonia Sacra (premiered February 18 in Philadelphia)
- Hans Werner Henze – Symphony No. 4
- Vagn Holmboe
  - String Quartet No. 5, Op. 66
  - Cantata No. 9
- Alan Hovhaness – Symphony No. 2 Mysterious Mountain
- Wojciech Kilar
  - Small Overture (Little Overture) for symphony orchestra
  - Symphony for Strings
- Zoltan Kodaly – Nemzeti dal
- Osvaldo Lacerda – Miniaturas de Adelmar Tavares (4), for voice and piano
- Witold Lutosławski – Dance Preludes (2nd version for clarinet and chamber group)
- Bohuslav Martinů
  - Gilgameš (choral work based on the Epic of Gilgamesh)
  - The Frescoes of Piero della Francesca (Les fresques de Piero della Francesca, orchestral; composed)
  - Oboe Concerto
- Darius Milhaud – Symphony No. 6
- Luigi Nono
  - Canti per tredeci for 13 instruments
  - Incontri for 24 instruments
- Per Nørgård
  - Symphony No. 1 Sinfonia austera
  - Trio No. 1, Op. 15
- Walter Piston – Symphony No. 6
- Edmund Rubbra – Piano Concerto
- William Schuman – Credendum
- John Serry Sr. –
  - American Rhapsody – for Stradella Accordion
  - Petite Tango – for Stradella Accordion
  - Tarantella – for Stradella Accordion revised
- Fela Sowande – African Suite for string orchestra
- Karlheinz Stockhausen – Klavierstücke V–VIII
- Igor Stravinsky – Canticum Sacrum
- Alexandre Tansman
  - Concerto for Orchestra
  - Capriccio for Orchestra
- Michael Tippett
  - Piano Concerto (composition completed)
  - Sonata for Four Horns
- Ernst Toch – Symphony No. 3
- Ralph Vaughan Williams – Symphony No. 8 in D minor
- Heitor Villa-Lobos
  - String Quartet No. 16
  - Symphony No. 11
- William Walton
  - Johannesburg Festival Overture
  - Score for Richard III (film)
- Franz Waxman – Sinfonietta for Strings and Timpani
- Iannis Xenakis – Pithoprakta for orchestra

== Opera ==
- Carlisle Floyd – Susannah (premiered February 24 at Florida State University, Tallahassee)
- Lukas Foss – Griffelkin (opera in three acts, libretto by A. Reed after H. Foss, premiered November 6 on NBC television in the United States)
- Dmitry Kabalevsky – Nikita Vershinin (premiered November 26 at Bolshoi Theatre, Moscow)
- Darius Milhaud – Agamemnon and Les choëphores (from the Oresteia trilogy, premiered May 29 at Landestheater Darmstadt, Germany)
- Alexis Roland-Manuel – Jeanne d'Arc
- Michael Tippett – The Midsummer Marriage (premiered January 27 at Royal Opera House, Covent Garden, London)

== Film ==
- Elmer Bernstein – The Man with the Golden Arm
- Bernard Herrmann – The Trouble With Harry
- Bronislau Kaper – The Prodigal
- Alex North – Unchained (featuring "Unchained Melody")
- Leonard Rosenman – East of Eden
- Leonard Rosenman – Rebel Without a Cause
- William Walton – Richard III

== Musical theater ==
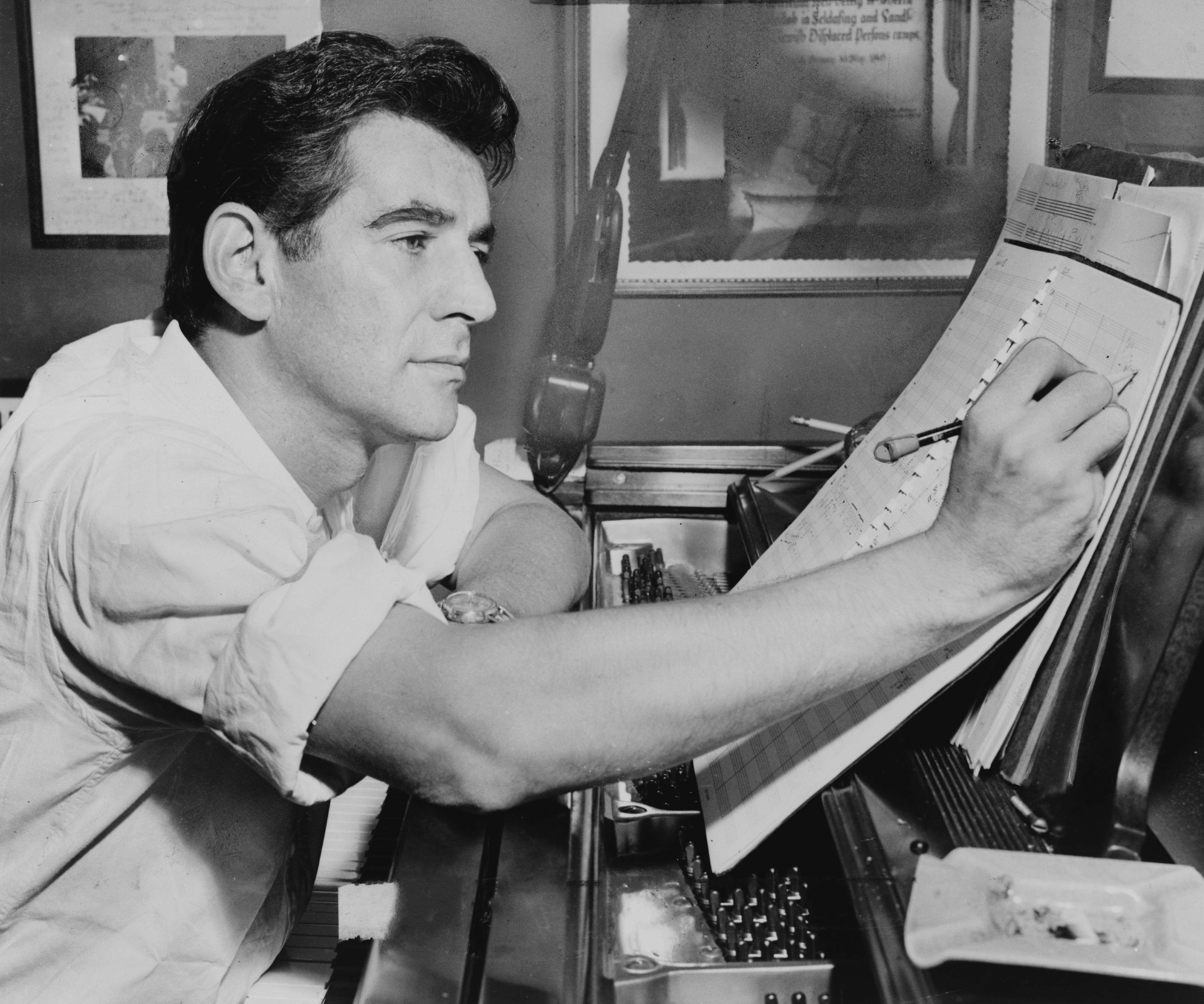
Composer and conductor Leonard Bernstein in 1955

- The Amazing Adele – Philadelphia production
- Ankles Aweigh – Broadway production
- Catch A Star – Broadway production
- Damn Yankees (Richard Adler and Jerry Ross) – Broadway production
- Kismet – London production opens at the Stoll Theatre on April 20 and runs for 648 performances
- The Pajama Game (Richard Adler and Jerry Ross) – London production opens at the Coliseum on October 13 and runs for 501 performances
- Phoenix '55 – Broadway production
- Pipe Dream (Rodgers and Hammerstein) – Broadway production
- Plain and Fancy – Broadway production
- Romance in Candlelight – London production opens at the Piccadilly Theatre on September 15 and runs for 53 performances
- Seventh Heaven – Broadway production opens at the ANTA Playhouse on May 26 and runs for 44 performances
- Shoestring Revue – Broadway production
- Silk Stockings – Broadway production
- Wonderful Town (Leonard Bernstein, Betty Comden and Adolph Green) – London production opens at the Princes Theatre on February 24 and runs for 207 performances

== Musical films ==
- Artists and Models released November 7 starring Dean Martin and Jerry Lewis
- As Long as They're Happy starring Jack Buchanan, Janette Scott, Jeannie Carson, Jerry Wayne, Diana Dors and Joan Sims
- The Benny Goodman Story
- Daddy Long Legs
- Gentlemen Marry Brunettes
- The Girl Rush starring Rosalind Russell, Fernando Lamas, Eddie Albert and Gloria DeHaven
- Guys and Dolls released November 3 starring Frank Sinatra and Marlon Brando
- It's Always Fair Weather
- Jupiter's Darling starring Howard Keel, Esther Williams, Marge Champion and Gower Champion
- King's Rhapsody starring Anna Neagle and Errol Flynn
- Kismet
- Lady and the Tramp – animated feature released June 22 featuring the songs and voice of Peggy Lee
- Love Me or Leave Me
- Oklahoma! (Rodgers and Hammerstein) released October 11
- Pete Kelly's Blues
- The Seven Little Foys

== Musical television ==
- Heidi – television production
- Our Town – television production
- Together With Music – CBS television production by Noël Coward

== Births ==
- January 3 – Helen O'Hara, British rock violinist (Dexys Midnight Runners)
- January 4 – Mark Hollis, English rock singer-songwriter (Talk Talk) (died 2019)
- January 8 – Mike Reno, Canadian rock drummer and lead singer (Loverboy and Moxy
- January 10 – Michael Schenker, German guitarist, songwriter and producer
- January 13
  - Paul Kelly, rock musician
  - Fred White, drummer (Earth Wind & Fire) (died 2022)
- January 17 – Steve Earle, folk singer (Del McCoury Band)
- January 19 – Sir Simon Rattle, orchestral conductor
- January 26 – Eddie Van Halen, rock guitarist and songwriter (died 2020)
- January 27 – Richard Young (Kentucky Headhunters)
- February 12 – Bill Laswell, American bass guitarist and producer (Massacre, Material, Tabla Beat Science, Painkiller and Praxis)
- February 18 – Riff Regan, lead singer of rock band London
- February 23 – Howard Jones, pop keyboardist and singer-songwriter
- March 2 – Jay Osmond, singer-songwriter (The Osmonds)
- March 4 – Boon Gould, guitarist (Level 42)
- March 10 – Bunny DeBarge, soul singer-songwriter (DeBarge)
- March 15 – Dee Snider, rock singer-songwriter (Twisted Sister and Bent Brother)
- March 28 – Reba McEntire, country singer
- March 31 – Angus Young, rock guitarist and songwriter (AC/DC)
- April 10 – Lesley Garrett, soprano
- April 13 – Louis Johnson, bass guitarist (The Brothers Johnson)
- April 17 – Pete Shelley, rock singer, songwriter and guitarist (Buzzcocks) (died 2018)
- April 19 – Rolf Løvland, Norwegian composer, lyricist, arranger and pianist (Secret Garden)
- May 4 – Lynne Spears, American mother of musician and singer-songwriters Jamie Lynn Spears and Britney Spears
- May 7 – Steve Diggle, English punk musician (Buzzcocks and Flag of Convenience)
- May 9 – Anne Sofie von Otter, operatic mezzo-soprano
- May 12 – Kix Brooks, country singer (Brooks & Dunn)
- May 13 – Garry Bushell, newspaper columnist, rock music journalist and singer, television presenter, writer and political activist
- May 16 – Hazel O'Connor, new wave singer-songwriter
- May 20
  - Steve George, keyboardist (Mr. Mister)
  - Zbigniew Preisner, composer
- May 21 – Stan Lynch, songwriter and drummer (Tom Petty & the Heartbreakers)
- May 23 – Mary Black, folk singer
- May 29 – Pascal Dusapin, French composer
- May 30 – Topper Headon, rock drummer (The Clash)
- June 7
  - Jon Balke, Norwegian pianist and orchestra leader
  - Joey Scarbury, singer
- June 8 – Jon King, post-punk singer-songwriter (Gang Of Four)
- June 23 – Glenn Danzig, lead singer of Danzig
- June 26 – Mick Jones, rock guitarist and singer-songwriter (The Clash)
- June 28 – Thomas Hampson, operatic baritone
- July 1
  - Nikolai Demidenko, classical pianist
  - Keith Whitley, country music singer (died 1989)
- July 4 – John Waite, rock singer, bass guitarist and songwriter
- July 10 – Stan Munsey, songwriter and keyboardist (Shenandoah)
- July 14 – Matthew Seligman, rock bassist (The Soft Boys) (died 2020)
- July 18 – Terry Chambers, rock drummer (XTC)
- July 20 – Jem Finer, folk rock banjoist, composer (The Pogues) and multimedia artist
- July 21
  - Howie Epstein, American bass guitarist, songwriter and producer (Tom Petty and the Heartbreakers) (died 2003)
  - Henry Priestman, English singer-songwriter, keyboardist and producer (The Christians, It's Immaterial and Yachts)
- July 29 – Eusèbe Jaojoby, salegy composer and singer
- August 2 – Butch Vig, producer, drummer (Garbage)
- August 6 – Eric Paulin, drummer (The Meetles)
- August 13 – Mulgrew Miller, American jazz pianist (died 2013)
- August 17
  - Colin Moulding, English bass guitarist, songwriter and vocalist (XTC)
  - Kevin Welch, American singer-songwriter and guitarist
- August 25 – John McGeoch guitarist (Magazine, PiL and Siouxsie and the Banshees) (died 2004)
- August 28 – Beres Hammond, reggae singer
- August 29 – Diamanda Galás, singer, composer, pianist and performance artist
- September 1
  - Bruce Foxton, rock singer (The Jam)
  - Andy Pape, American-born Danish composer
- September 3 – Steve Jones, rock guitarist and singer (The Sex Pistols)
- September 9 – Ivan Nikolayevich Smirnov, guitarist
- September 13 – Andreas Staier, harpsichordist and fortepianist
- September 18 – Sid Griffin, bluegrass singer-songwriter and popular music historian
- September 25
  - Zucchero Fornaciari, singer-songwriter and blues musician
  - Steve Severin, British bassist (Siouxsie and the Banshees)
- September 26 – Carlene Carter, American singer-songwriter and guitarist
- September 28 – Kenny Kirkland, American jazz pianist (died 1998)
- October 2 – Philip Oakey, singer (The Human League)
- October 7 – Yo-Yo Ma, cellist
- October 12
  - Pat DiNizio, American singer/guitarist (The Smithereens) (died 2017)
  - Jane Siberry, Canadian singer-songwriter
- October 16 – Leonid Desyatnikov, composer
- October 18 – Hiromi Go, singer
- October 21
  - Fred Hersch, American jazz pianist
  - Rich Mullins, American Christian singer-songwriter (died 1997)
- October 25 – Matthias Jabs, German rock guitarist (Scorpions)
- October 29
  - Kevin Dubrow, American rock singer (Quiet Riot) (died 2007)
  - Roger O'Donnell, English rock keyboardist
- November 12 – Les McKeown, pop rock singer (Bay City Rollers) (died 2021)
- November 21 – Kyle Gann, American composer, teacher and critic
- November 23 – Ludovico Einaudi, Italian composer and pianist
- November 27 – Bill Nye, American television presenter
- November 30 – Billy Idol, rock singer
- December 6
  - Rick Buckler, rock drummer (The Jam) (died 2025)
  - Bright Sheng, composer
- December 8 – Kasim Sulton, American singer-songwriter, bass player and producer
- December 15 – Paul Simonon, bass guitarist (The Clash)
- date unknown – Susan Addison, sackbut player

== Deaths ==
- January 10 – Annette Mills, partner of "Muffin the Mule", 60
- January 27 – Maurice Frigara, French conductor, 80
- January 30 – Mary Mellish, American soprano
- February 14 – Charles Cuvillier, composer of operettas, 77
- March 12 – Charlie Parker, jazz saxophonist, 34 (lobar pneumonia, bleeding ulcer and cirrhosis of liver)
- April 10 – Oskar Lindberg, composer, 67
- April 12 – W. H. Anderson, composer, 72
- May 4 – George Enescu, composer, 73
- May 15 – Oskar Adler, violinist and music critic, 79
- May 17 – Francesco Balilla Pratella, composer and musicologist, 75
- May 22 – Albert Valsien, composer and conductor, 73
- June 11 – Marcel Samuel-Rousseau, organist, composer and opera producer, 72
- June 19 – Willy Burkhard, composer, 55
- June 28 – Göta Ljungberg, Wagnerian soprano, 56
- July 4 – Ruth Vincent, operatic soprano, 78
- July 7 – Franco Casavola, Futurist composer, 63
- July 25
  - Isaak Dunayevsky, conductor and composer, 55
  - Ilmari Hannikainen, composer, 62 (drowned)
- August 5 – Carmen Miranda, singer and dancer, 46 (heart attack)
- August 13 – Florence Easton, soprano, 72
- August 22 – Olin Downes, music critic, 69
- August 24 – Edgar Henrichsen, organist and composer, 76
- October 7 – Frieda Hempel, operatic soprano, 70
- October 14 – Harry Parr-Davies, composer and songwriter, 41 (perforated ulcer)
- October 20 – Adolf Mišek, double bassist and composer, 80
- October 27 – Bernardo de Muro, operatic tenor, 73
- November 11 – Jerry Ross, songwriter, 29 (bronchiectasis)
- November 12 – Bessie Brown, 65 (heart attack)
- November 22 – Guy Ropartz, composer and conductor, 91
- November 27 – Arthur Honegger, composer, 63
- November 30 – Josip Štolcer-Slavenski, composer, 58
- December 5 – Lucien Durosoir, violinist and composer, 67
- December 11 – Franz Syberg, composer, 51
- December 21 – Gladys Ripley, operatic contralto, 47
- date unknown – Vernon Isley, original Isley brother, 13 (road accident)
