= Alberto Caprioli =

Italian composer and conductor

- Born: 16 November 1956 (age 69); Bologna, Italy
- Occupations: Composer and conductor

Alberto Caprioli (born 16 November 1956) is an Italian composer and conductor associated with contemporary classical music. Baker's Biographical Dictionary of Musicians also describes him as a teacher and writer on music. In 2012, the Accademia dei Lincei awarded him the Leonardo Paterna Baldizzi Prize for the composition Fuggente (a Giovanni Morelli, Voce del Pensiero).

== Education and career ==
Caprioli was born in Bologna. He studied composition with Camillo Togni and conducting with Otmar Suitner. He continued his composition studies with Bogusław Schaeffer at Mozarteum University Salzburg and studied the humanities at the University of Bologna.

According to Baker's Biographical Dictionary, Caprioli began teaching conducting at the Bologna Conservatory in 1980 and held its conducting chair from 1989. Milano Musica records conducting appearances at the Berlin State Opera and Austrian Radio in 1981, followed by an Italian debut with the Dresden Philharmonic in 1983.

== Music ==
Caprioli's output includes chamber, vocal and orchestral music, as well as works using tape and live electronics. His compositions have been commissioned by festivals and institutions including Wien Modern, the Warsaw Autumn, the Europäisches Musikfest Stuttgart and the Centre de Création Musicale Iannis Xenakis. The 1989 Aspekte festival in Salzburg programmed several of his works.

Among his works are Due notturni d'oblio (1988), Sette frammenti dal Kyrie per Dino Campana (1991) and Vor dem singenden Odem, first performed in 1990 and revised in 1992. In 2016, the Teatro Comunale di Bologna commissioned his orchestral work Ode alla luce, which received its premiere at the Bologna Modern festival under conductor Marco Angius. In 2020, Vor dem singenden Odem was performed by the Ex Novo Ensemble, conducted by Claudio Ambrosini, at the Venice Biennale's 64th International Festival of Contemporary Music.

== Reception and recordings ==
Caprioli is included in the ninth edition of Baker's Biographical Dictionary of Musicians, in the 2005 update to the Dizionario enciclopedico universale della musica e dei musicisti, and in the second volume of Bogusław Schaeffer's survey of twentieth-century composers, Kompozytorzy XX wieku: Od Messiaena do Capriolego.

Recordings devoted to his music include Alberto Caprioli: Musica da camera, issued by Pro Viva in 1988, and Alberto Caprioli: Aria bizantina, released by Stradivarius in 2016. The latter recording was reviewed in the Italian music magazines Amadeus and Classic Voice.
