= Together With Music =

Mary Martin and Noël Coward in Together With Music

Together With Music was a one-off programme, broadcast live in 1955 on American television, starring Noël Coward and Mary Martin. Described as "an entertainment", the show was directed by Coward, who wrote most of the featured material, some of it written for the broadcast. Songs by Cole Porter, George and Ira Gershwin, Rodgers and Hammerstein and others were also included. A kinescope recording of the live broadcast survives, and an audio recording has been published on LP and CD.

The show was Coward's début on American television; Martin had appeared in several earlier TV broadcasts. As it was to be transmitted live, Coward insisted on exceptionally thorough rehearsal to ensure as far as possible that nothing went wrong on the night. There was no chorus, there were no elaborate sets. The two stars performed the entire ninety-minute show, separately and together. Reviews were enthusiastic.

== Background ==
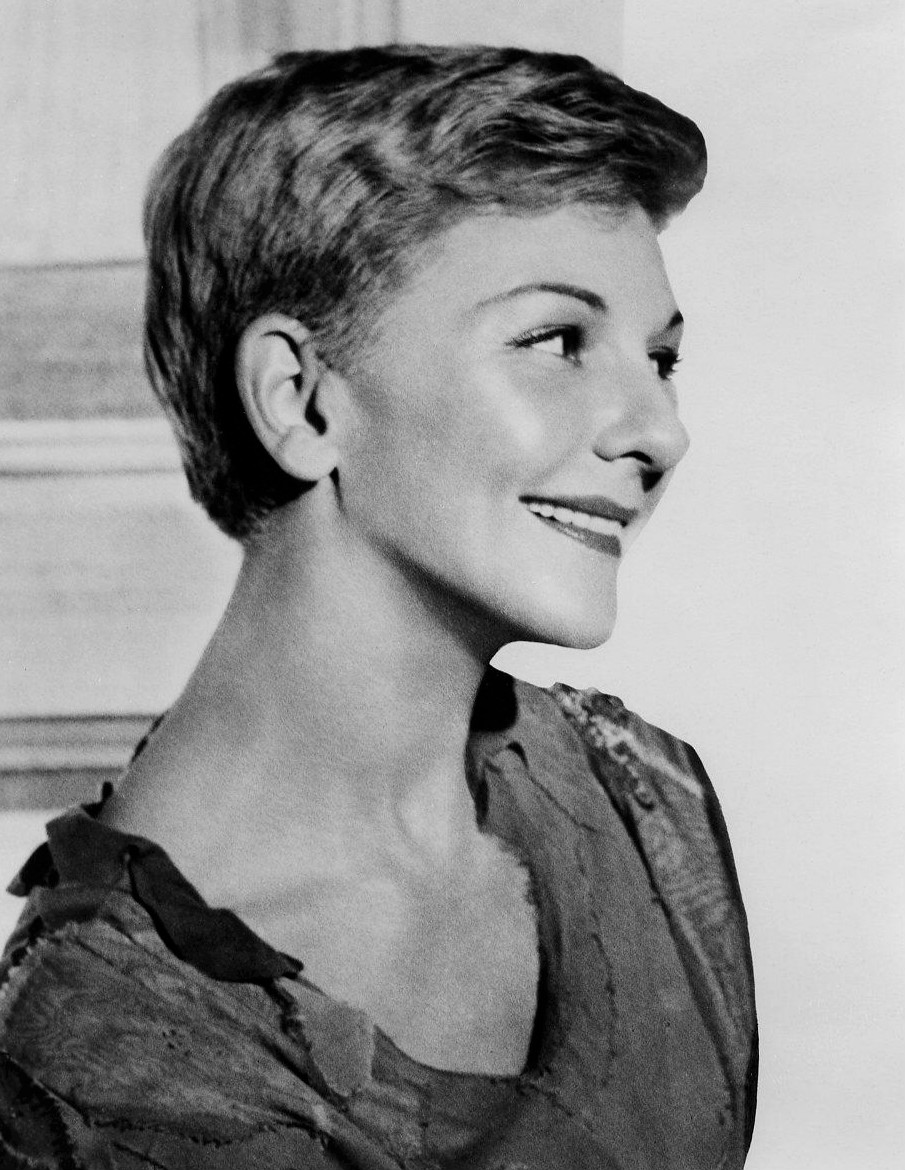
Martin as Peter Pan in 1954

By the mid-1950s Mary Martin was an established Broadway star. She had appeared in leading roles in shows including One Touch of Venus (1943) and South Pacific (1949). Coward had been a successful dramatist, song-writer and performer since the 1920s. The two had worked together on Pacific 1860, a musical written and directed by Coward, which ran in London at the Theatre Royal, Drury Lane in 1946–47. Although they got on well socially, their working relationship proved difficult, and after the show closed, Martin concluded, "Professionally, Coward and Martin just don't have anything more to offer each other". There was a rapprochement in the 1950s. When Martin was appearing in the West End production of South Pacific in 1951–52 Coward found an opportunity to renew their professional association. Asked to stage and appear in a fund-raising show for charity at the Cafe de Paris, where he starred as a cabaret entertainer, Coward recruited Martin as his sole co-performer in a two-and-a-half hour musical revue in January 1952. It was so successful that they repeated it the following year. Gertrude Lawrence, the singer and actress with whom Coward was most closely associated, died in 1952, and when offered $500,000 to make three coast-to-coast television broadcasts for CBS in 1955 Coward chose to co-star with Martin in the first of the three, a show based on his songs. (Note: The other two CBS broadcasts were Blithe Spirit and This Happy Breed, in live performances transmitted respectively on 14 January and 5 May 1956. The original plan was that the third broadcast would be of Present Laughter, but Bill Paley, the head of CBS, took a dislike to the play, fearing it would provoke "angry letters ... written by outraged Methodists in Omaha".)

Because the show was to be broadcast live Coward insisted on rigorous rehearsals, of which there were forty-one. Martin had performed on American television before, but this was Coward's début. At an early stage Martin found fault with one of the two new numbers, "Together With Music", the title song Coward had written for the show. He rewrote it, noting in his diary, "'Together with Music', second version, is finished. It is better than the first really but it was bloody hell to do. However, now it is done, and Mary's delighted and everyone's delighted. There were last-minute problems with the sponsors of the show. CBS had sold the airtime to the Ford Motor Company for its "Ford Star Jubilee" series. Executives at Ford took exception to some of Coward's lyrics such as (in "Nina") "that sycophantic lot of sluts/For ever wriggling their guts", which they said would offend the Bible Belt. Coward refused to make the changes they sought.

This was CBS's first live colour production. In the middle of rehearsals Coward learned that it was common studio practice to kinescope live broadcasts for archival purposes. He suggested that CBS should kinescope a rehearsal, so that all concerned could learn from their mistakes and correct them before the broadcast. In viewing the result, even a newcomer such as Coward could see that the camera techniques were inadequate. His life partner, Graham Payn, wrote: "the production was sloppy; the sound balance was frequently off, most of it was in long shot, and the 'point' numbers were made pointless. It was terrible!" Coward took control. He re-blocked the show to ensure that most of it was seen in close-up, and he marked the script in precise detail, instructing cameramen when to zoom in on the performer.

== Show ==
Together With Music was broadcast live on 22 October 1955. Coward directed the staging (Jerome Shaw was the director for television). The nationwide audience was estimated at thirty million. There were no elaborate sets. The two performers were seen coming out of their dressing rooms, bickering mildly:

You always hoot when you go over E-flat.
I haven't hooted in years.
You haven't been over E-flat in years.

Coward felt that Martin's sweet nature somewhat undermined the effect of their supposed squabbling:

She infuses our comedy bickering with saccharin and shies away from any riposte which sounds as though she were being "mean" to me. This is not a help in scenes which have been written on the assumption that we are having a light professional quarrel. The result will be that I shall play rings round her. None of this much matters but it is certainly aggravating.

== Songs ==
As the broadcast was live on commercial television there had to be advertisement breaks, during which the performance in the studio stopped. The programme consisted of the following numbers, all of which have words and music by Coward except where indicated:

=== Part I ===
- Duologue outside the dressing-room, with song, "Ninety Minutes is a Long, Long Time"
- Duet: "Together with Music"
- Coward solo items, introduced by Martin:

- "Uncle Harry" (Pacific 1860)
- "Loch Lomond" (trad.)
- "Nina" (Sigh No More)
- "Mad Dogs and Englishmen" (Words and Music)

- Martin solo items, introduced by Coward:

- "I Only Have Eyes for You" (Harry Warren and Al Dubin)
- "I Get a Kick Out of You" (Cole Porter)
- "Les filles de Cadiz" (Léo Delibes)

=== Part II ===
- Coward in a medley of his songs:

- "I'll See You Again" (Bitter Sweet)
- "Dance, Little Lady" (This Year of Grace)
- "Poor Little Rich Girl" (On with the Dance)
- "A Room with a View" (This Year of Grace)
- "Some Day I'll Find You" (Private Lives)
- "I'll Follow My Secret Heart" (Conversation Piece)
- "If Love were All" (Bitter-Sweet)
- "Play, Orchestra, Play" (Tonight at 8.30)

- Martin in a medley from South Pacific (Rodgers and Hammerstein):

- "Dites Moi"
- "Cockeyed Optimist"
- "Some Enchanted Evening"
- "I'm Gonna Wash That Man Right Outa My Hair"
- "I'm in Love with a Wonderful Guy"

- Martin: "My Heart Belongs to Daddy" (Porter)
- Coward solos:

- "World Weary" (This Year of Grace)
- "What's Going to Happen to the Tots?" (Whitebirds)

- Martin: burlesque of "One Fine Day" (Puccini, Madama Butterfly)

=== Part III ===
- Martin solo: "London Pride"
- Coward solo: "Deep in the Heart of Texas" (June Hershey and Don Swander)
- Duets:

- "Get Out Those Old Records" (Carmen Lombardo and John Jacob Loeb)
- "They Didn't Believe Me" (Jerome Kern and Herbert Reynolds)
- "'S Wonderful" (George and Ira Gershwin)
- "Time on My Hands" (Vincent Youmans, Harold Adamson and Mack Gordon)
- "I Never Knew What Time It Was" (Rodgers and Hart)
- "Anything Goes" (Porter)
- "Dancing In the Dark" (Howard Dietz and Arthur Schwartz)
- "Ballerina" (Sidney Keith Russell and Carl Sigman)
- "I Won't Dance" (Kern and Dorothy Fields)
- "Papa, Won't You Dance with Me?" (Sammy Cahn and Jule Styne)
- "Charleston" (Cecil Mack and James P. Johnson)
- "The Way You Look Tonight" (Kern and Fields)
- "You're an Old Smoothie" (Nacio Herb Brown, Buddy DeSylva, Richard A. Whiting)
- "Young and Foolish" (Albert Hague and Arnold B. Horwitt)
- "Always True to You in My Fashion" (Porter)
- "Stumbling" (Zez Confrey)
- "Japanese Sandman" (Richard A. Whiting and Raymond B. Egan)
- "The Continental" (Con Conrad and Herb Magidson)

The show ended with the two performers waltzing to "Shall We Dance?" from Rodgers and Hammerstein's The King and I and finally turning their backs to the cameras and strolling away arm in arm.

== Reception ==
The performances of the two stars were praised. Hedda Hopper wrote, "The greatest entertainment I've ever seen on TV was Mary Martin and Noel Coward in 90 minutes of song and fun. Mary was a vision in Mainbocher's gowns; Noel's sophistication a delight; their songs, their delivery, their everything was only great". In the Daily News, Ben Gross wrote:

A genius and a superb singer of musical comedy songs highlighted television over the week-end. … The genius is that amazingly versatile Britisher, Noel Coward, and the one-in-a-million intoner of tuneful ditties, that pride of Texas, Mary Martin. It was Noel's TV debut, and he may write off the occasion as one of the triumphs of his career. During ninety minutes, less time out for commercials, the Britisher and Mary, alone and together, faced the inexorable cameras and presented the brightest, most intelligent, and most captivating musical revue I have ever seen on video … it was a knock-out of a show.

Other press comments included, "Are there greater heights for television than Together With Music? An hour and a half of Mary Martin and Noel Coward, performing with that suave perfection that no one else can touch, was the pinnacle of entertainment" (Mary Cremmen, Boston Evening Globe); "I've never seen the likes of this astonishing theatrical tour de force on television before and it may be a long time before we see anything comparable to it again" (Jack Anderson, Miami Herald; "In terms of artistry, wit and sheer excitement, I doubt that there has ever been a more satisfying television show than the Mary Martin–Noel Coward act, Together With Music. ... It will stand as a landmark" (Harriet Van Horne, New York World-Telegram & Sun); and "What is there to say about it? If you saw it you know it was sheer delight, and if you didn't see it, there aren't words to tell you what you missed" (Ethel Daccardo, Chicago News).

On his return home, Coward wrote:

I came back here, flushed with triumph; as I said to Larry and Vivien, my TV success made Las Vegas look like a bad matinée at the Dundee Rep. I was really quite startled; telegrams started to arrive while the show was still on, from all over America, and from the moment it was over I was buttonholed wherever I went, the telephone never stopped ringing and I didn’t have a moment to go to the loo. One night at Twenty-One I was serenaded by the entire Yale Glee Club who came up to my table and belted "Anchors Aweigh" while I was trying to have a quiet dinner with Edna Ferber.

== Recordings ==
The show, though transmitted live, was filmed by the kinescope process (in grainy black-and-white rather than colour), and an audio recording was also made. The former has been posted on YouTube and the latter was released on LP in 1978 and on CD the following year by DRG Records.

== Notes, references and sources ==
=== Sources ===
- Coward, Noël (1982). Payn, Graham; Morley, Sheridan (eds.). The Noël Coward Diaries (1941–1969). London: Methuen. ISBN 978-0-297-78142-4.
- Day, Barry, ed. (2007). The Letters of Noël Coward. London: Methuen. ISBN 978-1-4081-0675-4.
- Hoare, Philip (1995). Noël Coward, A Biography. London: Sinclair-Stevenson. ISBN 978-1-4081-0675-4.
- Mander, Raymond; Mitchenson, Joe; Day, Barry; Morley, Sheridan (2000) [1957]. Theatrical Companion to Coward (second ed.). London: Oberon. ISBN 978-1-84002-054-0.
- Morley, Sheridan (1974) [1969]. A Talent to Amuse. London: Penguin. ISBN 978-0-14-003863-7.
- Payn, Graham (1994). My Life with Noël Coward. New York: Applause Books. ISBN 978-1-55783-190-3.
