= I Do! I Do! (original Broadway cast recording) =

Cast recording by the original Broadway cast
- Released: 1966
- Genre: Show tunes
- Label: RCA Victor
- Producer: Andy Wiswell

I Do! I Do!, subtitled The Original Broadway Cast Recording, is an album containing a recording of the 1966 Broadway musical I Do! I Do! made by its original cast consisting of Mary Martin and Robert Preston. The album was released by RCA Victor on December 1, 1966.

== Critical reception ==
Professional ratings
Review scores
Source	Rating
Billboard	(favorable)
AllMusic	4.5/5 stars

In his retrospective review for AllMusic, William Ruhlmann rated the album 4.5 stars out of five, writing: "The main draws to this two-character musical are the two stars: Mary Martin and Robert Preston. [The show] traces 50 years of a marriage, and [its] relative banality is overcome by the strong performances of the principals."

Back in 1966, Billboard picked the album for its "Spotlight" section. The magazine's reviewer noted: "The cast of two comes across the wax as a full chorus. They beautifully interpret the music and lyrics [...]."

== Chart performance ==
The album reached number 84 on the Billboard's Top LPs chart.

== Track listing ==
LP – RCA Victor LOC-1128 (mono), LSO-1128 (stereo)

All lyrics are written by Tom Jones; all music is composed by Harvey Schmidt.

Side 1
No.	Title	Artist(s)	Length
1.	"All The Dearly Beloved; Together Forever; I Do! I Do!"	Mary Martin and Robert Preston	5:55
2.	"Goodnight"	Mary Martin and Robert Preston	2:13
3.	"I Love My Wife"	Robert Preston	2:00
4.	"Something Has Happened"	Mary Martin	1:39
5.	"My Cup Runneth Over"	Mary Martin and Robert Preston	2:10
6.	"Love Isn't Everything"	Mary Martin and Robert Preston	3:23
7.	"Nobody's Perfect"	Mary Martin and Robert Preston	5:48

Side 2
No.	Title	Artist(s)	Length
1.	"A Well Known Fact"	Robert Preston	2:37
2.	"Flaming Agnes"	Mary Martin	3:42
3.	"The Honeymoon Is Over"	Mary Martin and Robert Preston	1:55
4.	"Where Are the Snows?"	Mary Martin and Robert Preston	2:39
5.	"When the Kids Get Married"	Mary Martin and Robert Preston	2:10
6.	"The Father of the Bride"	Robert Preston	2:56
7.	"What Is a Woman?"	Mary Martin	3:05
8.	"Someone Needs Me"	Mary Martin	1:49
9.	"Roll Up the Ribbons"	Mary Martin and Robert Preston	1:23
10.	"This House"	Mary Martin and Robert Preston	1:53

== Personnel ==
- Mary Martin
- Robert Preston
- Orchestra conducted by John Lesko

== Charts ==
Chart (1967)	Peak position
US Billboard Top LPs	84

== Awards ==
Year	Award type	Categories	Results	Ref.
1968	Grammy Awards	Best Score from an Original Cast Show Album	Nominated	
