= Drei Originalstücke für das elektrische Welte-Mignon-Klavier =

- by Ernst Toch
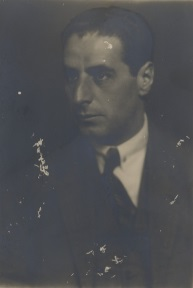
- Ernst Toch in 1919
- English: Three Original Pieces for the Electric Welte-Mignon Piano
- Form: Set of études
- Occasion: Donaueschingen Festival
- Composed: 1926
- Performed: July 25, 1926
- Duration: 5 minutes
- Movements: 3
- Scoring: Player piano (Welte-Mignon mechanical piano)

Drei Originalstücke für das elektrische Welte-Mignon-Klavier (German: Three Original Pieces for the Electric Welte-Mignon Piano) is a set of three études for player piano by composer Ernst Toch. Completed in 1926, these were some of the few pieces composed for the Welte-Mignon.

== Background ==
These three études were composed along with an arrangement for player piano of "Der Jongleur" (The Juggler), a burlesque originally written in 1923 and included in the set Three Burlesques, Op. 31, for piano. The études, as opposed to the arrangement, were original compositions written with the player piano in mind, which allowed for less technical limitations. All four pieces were written for the 1926 edition of the Donaueschingen Festival, a very well-known festival of modern music, as Toch, along with other composers like Paul Hindemith and Gerhart Münch, was asked to write pieces for the occasion. The original piano rolls had the inscription "Nicht handgespielt, sondern mechanisch übertragen" (Created mechanically, not played by hand) on them. All pieces premiered on July 25, 1926, in Donaueschingen, Germany. The pieces were never published as scores and the circulation of any original rolls is nowadays rare. The three studies were catalogued as "Welte No. 4013", "Welte No. 4014", and "Welte No. 4015" respectively, whereas the arrangement of "Der Jongleur" received "Welte No. 4016".

Just as I do not want to spend my days and nights in water, since I am a human being, not a fish, but nonetheless partake of the quite incomparable enjoyment of a sporadic dip, so the 'coolness' of mechanical music is not meant to replace the 'heat' of the usual, but exist beside it as something special, unique.

— Ernst Toch

== Structure ==
The set comprises three studies of a very short duration, the longest one of them lasting for 2 minutes and 30 seconds approximately. They are specifically written for player piano, so they are not constrained by the technical capabilities of a real human performer. Player piano champion Jürgen Hocker has described the first study as a fantasia, the second one as a scherzo, and the third one as a slow passacaglia. Harmonically and rhythmically, it contains elements of ragtime and bears the inspiration of fellow composer Hans Haass.

== Recording ==
Jürgen Hocker has recorded the piece on a Bosendörfer grand piano. The recording process took place in June 2005 in an extensive collection of pieces written specifically for player piano. The recording, taken in Immanuelskirche, in Wuppertal, was released by MDG in 2007, and, as of 2026, remains the only published recording of the set.
