= Mary Martin Sings, Richard Rodgers Plays =

Mary Martin Sings – Richard Rodgers Plays

Studio album by Mary Martin and Richard Rodgers
- Released: 1958
- Label: RCA Victor

Mary Martin Sings – Richard Rodgers Plays is a studio album by Mary Martin and Richard Rodgers, released in 1958 on RCA Victor.

== Background ==
The album featured Richard Rodgers' songs as sung by Mary Martin, with arrangements by Robert Russell Bennett. The official Masterworks Broadway website describes it as "in essence, an early concept album, not a series of haphazardly selected numbers" and continues: "At the heart of this album [...] is the evident joy and warmth shared by two good friends, and the magic that frequently happened when these friends found themselves together in festive company. This album is a party, just like those opening-night parties way back when."

== Critical reception ==
Professional ratings
Review scores
Source	Rating
Billboard	(favorable)

The Billboard magazine picked the album for review. The reviewer started by noting that the album included "some of the composer's best songs" along with "several that did not quite reach the popularity of his many standards". Then, he noted that Mary Martin sang the songs "with charm", commended the "attractive arrangements" by Robert Russell Bennett and concluded: "The Broadway-goer will find this very much to his liking". Moreover, the reviewer noted the "good cover shot of the composer and artist".

== Track listing ==
12-inch LP – RCA Victor LPM 1539

Side 1
No.	Title	Lyrics	Music	Length
1.	"Getting to Know You"	Oscar Hammerstein II	Richard Rodgers	2:38
2.	"You're Nearer"	Lorenz Hart	Richard Rodgers	3:44
3.	"I Could Write a Book"	Lorenz Hart	Richard Rodgers	2:36
4.	"Sleepy Head"	Lorenz Hart	Richard Rodgers	3:33
5.	"It Might as Well Be Spring" "My Funny Valentine"	Oscar Hammerstein II; Lorenz Hart	Richard Rodgers; Richard Rodgers	2:56; 2:13

Side 2
No.	Title	Lyrics	Music	Length
1.	"To Keep My Love Alive"	Lorenz Hart	Richard Rodgers	3:24
2.	"It Never Entered My Mind"	Lorenz Hart	Richard Rodgers	3:26
3.	"Moon of My Delight"	Lorenz Hart	Richard Rodgers	2:25
4.	"You Are Never Away"	Oscar Hammerstein II	Richard Rodgers	2:43
5.	"There's a Small Hotel"	Lorenz Hart	Richard Rodgers	3:55
6.	"Some Enchanted Evening"	Oscar Hammerstein II	Richard Rodgers	2:45

== Personnel ==
- Mary Martin
- Richard Rodgers
- Robert Russell Bennett
