= Symphony No. 11 (Villa-Lobos) =

- by Heitor Villa-Lobos
- Villa-Lobos in June 1952
- Catalogue: W527
- Composed: 1955
- Dedication: Serge and Natalie Koussevitzky
- Published: 1955: Paris
- Publisher: Max Eschig
- Movements: 4
- Scoring: Orchestra

Premiere
- Date: 2 March 1956:
- Location: Symphony Hall, Boston
- Conductor: Heitor Villa-Lobos
- Performers: Boston Symphony Orchestra

Symphony No. 11 is a composition by the Brazilian composer Heitor Villa-Lobos, written in 1955. A performance lasts about 25 minutes.

On 29 October 1954, along with a number of other prominent composers, Villa-Lobos was commissioned jointly by the Koussevitzky Music Foundation in the Library of Congress and the Boston Symphony Orchestra for a work to celebrate that orchestra's 75th anniversary. In response, he composed his Eleventh Symphony, which was completed in 1955. The autograph manuscript of the score, held by the Library of Congress, Washington, DC, is dedicated to Serge and Natalie Koussevitzky.

The symphony was first performed in Symphony Hall, Boston, on 2 March 1956 by the Boston Symphony Orchestra, conducted by the composer. The performance was warmly received in the press.

== Music ==
The symphony is scored for an orchestra consisting of 2 piccolos, 2 flutes, 2 oboes, cor anglais, 2 clarinets, bass clarinet, 2 bassoons, contrabassoon, 4 horns, 4 trumpets, 4 trombones, tuba, percussion (timpani, tam-tam, cymbals, triangle, matraca [a wooden rattle], bass drum, marimba, xylophone, celesta, and vibraphone), 2 harps, piano, and strings.

The symphony is in four movements:

1. Allegro moderato
2. Largo
3. Scherzo (Molto vivace)
4. Molto allegro
