= Symphony No. 3 (Toch) =

Symphony No. 3, Op. 75 (1955) is Ernst Toch's (1887—1964) third of seven symphonies. He was awarded the 1956 Pulitzer Prize for Music for the piece. Premiered December 2, 1955 by the Pittsburgh Symphony Orchestra conducted by William Steinberg, it was commissioned by the American Jewish Tercentenary Committee of Chicago.

The orchestration includes a "hisser", a carbon dioxide tank that makes a hissing noise, whose use is optional. His first three symphonies were inspired by his need to flee Nazi Germany and move to America.

Selecting the piece the jury wrote: "one of his finest works, of sure craftsmanship, contemporary in feeling, without self-conscious striving for the new and the original, beautiful and brilliant in orchestral sound."
