= Ernst Toch =

Austrian composer (1887–1964)

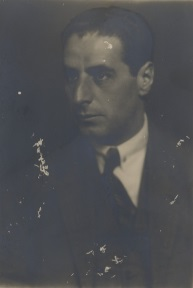
Ernst Toch in 1919

Ernst Toch (German: [ˈtɔχ]; 7 December 1887 – 1 October 1964) was an Austrian composer of European classical music and film scores, who from 1933 worked as an émigré in Paris, London and New York. He sought throughout his life to introduce new approaches to music.

== Biography ==
Toch was born in Leopoldstadt, Vienna, into the family of a humble Jewish leather dealer when the city was at its 19th-century cultural zenith. He studied philosophy at the University of Vienna, medicine at Heidelberg and music at the Hoch Conservatory (1909–1913) in Frankfurt under Iwan Knorr. His main instrument was the piano, and he was a pianist of considerable stature, performing to acclaim throughout much of western Europe. Much of his writing was intended for the piano.

Toch continued to grow as an artist and composer throughout his adult life, and in America came to influence whole new generations of composers. His first compositions date from c. 1900 and were pastiches in the style of Mozart (quartets, 1905 album verses for piano). His first quartet was performed in Leipzig in 1908, and his sixth (Opus 12, 1905) in the year 1909. In 1909, his Chamber Symphony in F major (written 1906) won the Frankfurt/Main Mozart prize. From this time onwards, Toch dedicated himself to being a full-time composer. He won the Mendelssohn prize for composition in 1910. In 1913, he was appointed lecturer of both piano and composition at the College of Music in Mannheim. After winning a further five major prizes for his works, he served four years in the army on the Italian Front during World War I. In 1916, he married Lilly Zwack, the daughter of a banker.

After World War I, he returned to Mannheim to compose, developing a new style of polyphony. He received his Ph.D. degree from Heidelberg University in 1921. He then taught on the faculty of the Mannheim Conservatory where one of his pupils was Hugo Chaim Adler.

Following Hitler's seizure of power in 1933, Toch went into exile, first to Paris and then London, where Berthold Viertel and Elisabeth Bergner helped him find work as a composer for the cinema. Films scored during this period included Catherine the Great, Little Friend and The Private Life of Don Juan. In 1935, he accepted an invitation from Alvin Johnson of the New School for Social Research to go to New York City. He could, however, only secure his living in California by composing film music for Hollywood, completing 16 scores. Unlike his colleague Erich Wolfgang Korngold, Toch never got much attention in the industry and was rarely top-billed, although he did win three Academy Award nominations - for Peter Ibbetson (1935), Ladies in Retirement (1941) and Address Unknown (1944). His score for the chase scene in Shirley Temple's 1937 Heidi perhaps remains his best-known piece of film music.

During his residence in California, he was a professor at the University of Southern California, where he taught both music and philosophy. He was also a guest lecturer at Harvard University. In 1958, he received the Order of Merit of the Federal Republic of Germany (Grand Merit Cross). He died in Santa Monica, California, and was interred in the Westwood Village Memorial Park Cemetery in Los Angeles. He is the grandfather of authors Lawrence Weschler and Toni Weschler.

== Work ==
Toch wrote eight string quartets before the war and five afterwards. No 9 (1919) marked a significant stylistic change, shifting from the influence of Brahms towards a more radical, extended tonality and linear development. During the 1920s Toch was considered one of the great avant-garde composers. His work during that decade included the Cello Concerto (1925) and the humorous Bunte Suite (1929), but also two short operas, Die Prinzessin auf der Erbse (1927) and Egon und Emilie (1928), notable examples of the short-lived Zeitoper genre. These led him towards the full-length three act opera Der Fächer of 1930. That year he also invented "Gesprochene Musik," the idiom of the "spoken chorus", a technique used in his most performed work, Fuge aus der Geographie, which he himself regarded as an unimportant diversion.

Between 1950 and 1964 he wrote seven symphonies. He won the Pulitzer Prize for Music in 1956 for his Third Symphony (premiered by the Pittsburgh Symphony Orchestra on December 2, 1955). He also wrote books dealing with musical theory: Melodielehre (1923) and The Shaping Forces in Music (1948). His notable students included Vagn Holmboe, André Previn and Richard Wernick.

== List of works ==
=== Symphonies ===
- Symphony No. 1, Op. 72 (1950) (pub. 1951)
- Symphony No. 2, Op. 73 (1951) (pub. 1953)
- Symphony No. 3, Op. 75 (1955) (pub. 1957)
- Symphony No. 4, for orchestra and speaker, Op. 80 (1957) (pub. 1960)
- Symphony No. 5 ‘Jephtha, Rhapsodic Poem’, Op. 89 (1963) (pub. 1965)
- Symphony No. 6, Op. 93 (1963) (pub. 1966)
- Symphony No. 7, Op. 95 (1964) (pub. 1968)

=== Concertos ===
- Concerto for Cello and Chamber Orchestra, Op. 35 (1924) (pub. 1925)
- Concerto for Piano and Orchestra, (Piano Concerto No. 1), Op. 38 (1926) (pub. 1926)
- Symphony for Piano and Orchestra, (Piano Concerto No. 2), Op. 61 (1933) (pub. 1933)

=== Other orchestral works ===
- Scherzo in B minor, orchestral version, Op. 11 (1904) (pub. c. 1905)
- Phantastishche Nachtmusik (Fantastic Serenade), for orchestra, Op. 27 (1920) (pub. c. 1921)
- Five Pieces for Chamber Orchestra, Op. 33 (1924) (pub. 1924)
- Komödie für Orchester in Einem Satz (Comedy for Orchestra in One Movement), Op. 42 (1927) (pub. 1927)
- Vorspiel zu einem Märchen (Prelude to a Fairy Tale), for orchestra, Op. 43a (1927) (pub. 1927) (Adapted from the overture of Princess & the Pea)
- Fanal (Beacon) for Organ and Orchestra, Op. 45 (1928) (pub. 1928)
- Bunte Suite (Motley Suite), for orchestra, Op. 48 (1928) (pub. 1929)
- Kleine Ouvertüre zu der Fächer (Little Overture to the Fan), for orchestra, Op. 51 (1929) (pub. 1929)
- Kleine Theater-Suite (Little Theater Suite), for orchestra, Op. 54 (1930) (pub. 1931)
- Big Ben: Variation-Fantasy on the Westminster Chimes, for orchestra, Op. 62 (1934) (pub. 1935)
- Pinocchio: A Merry Overture for Orchestra (1935) (pub. 1937)
- The Idle Stroller Suite, for orchestra (1938) (Unpublished)
- The Covenant (Sixth movement from The Genesis Suite), for orchestra and narrator (c. 1945) (Score lost; recording exists)
- Hyperion: A Dramatic Prelude for Orchestra, Op. 71 (1947) (pub. 1950)
- Circus: An Overture, for orchestra (1953) (pub. 1954)
- Notturno, for orchestra, Op. 77 (1953) (pub. 1957)
- Peter Pan, for orchestra, Op. 76 (1956) (pub. 1956)
- Intermezzo for orchestra (1959) (pub. 1962)
- Epilogue for orchestra (reorchestration of first movement of Idle Stroller) (1959) (pub. 1964)
- Short Story for orchestra (1961) (Unpublished)
- The Enamoured Harlequin, for orchestra, Op. 94 (1963) (Unpublished)
- Sinfonietta for String Orchestra, Op. 96 (1964) (pub. 1965)
- Variations on the Swabian Folk Song "Muss i denn zum Städtele hinaus", for orchestra (1964) (Unpublished)

=== Chamber ===
- String Quartet no. 6 in A minor, Op. 12 (1904–1905) (Unpublished)
- Chamber Symphony in F major, for flute, oboe, clarinet, bassoon, horn, 2 violins, cello and bass (1906) (Unpublished)
- String Quartet no. 7 in G major, Op. 15 (1908)
- Vom sterbenden Rokoko (From the Dying Rococo), for violin and piano, Op. 16 (1909) (pub. 1910)
- Duos for Two Violins, Op. 17 (1909) (pub. c. 1910)
- Romanze, for violin and piano (c. 1910) (pub. 1911)
- Serenade for Three Violins, Op. 20 (1911) (pub. 1912)
- Sonata for Violin and Piano, Op. 21 (1912) (Unpublished)
- Serenade (Spitzweg) for Two Violins and Viola, Op. 25 (1916) (pub. 1921)
- String Quartet no. 8 in D-flat major, Op. 18 (1910) (pub. 1911)
- String Quartet no. 9 in C major, Op. 26 (1919) (pub. 1920)
- String Quartet no. 10 on the Name ‘Bass’, Op. 28 (1920) (pub. c. 1923)
- Tanz-Suite (Dance Suite), for flute, clarinet, violin, viola, bass and percussion, Op. 30 (1923) (pub. 1924) (optional add. strings)
- String Quartet no. 11, Op. 34 (1924) (pub. 1924)
- Two Divertimentos for String Duet, Op. 37 (No. 1: violin and cello / No. 2: violin and viola) (1925) (pub. 1926)
- Sonata for Violin and Piano, Op. 44 (1928) (pub. 1928)
- Sonata for Cello and Piano, Op. 50 (1929) (pub. 1929)
- String Trio, for violin, viola and cello, Op. 63 (1936) (pub. 1955)
- Quintet for Piano, Two Violins, Viola and Cello, Op. 64 (1938) (pub. 1947)
- String Quartet no. 12, Op. 70 (1946) (pub. 1949)
- Dedication, for string quartet or string orchestra (1948) (pub. 1957)
- Adagio Elegiaco, for clarinet & piano (1950) (pub. 1987)
- String Quartet no. 13, Op. 74 (1953–1954) (pub. 1961)
- Sonatinetta, for flute, clarinet and bassoon, Op. 84 (1959) (pub. 1961)
- Three Impromptus for Unaccompanied String Instruments, Op. 90a (violin), 90b (viola), 90c (cello) (1963) (pub. 1965)
- Quartet for Oboe, Clarinet, Bassoon and Viola, Op. 98 (1964) (pub. 1967)

=== Wind ensemble ===
- Spiel für Blasorchester (Divertimento for Wind Orchestra), Op. 39 (1926) (pub. 1926; Donaueschingen première)
- Miniatur Ouvertüre for 2 flutes, oboe, clarinet, bass clarinet, 2 trumpets, trombone and percussion (1932) (pub. 1932)
- Five Pieces for Wind Instruments and Percussion, Op. 83 (1959) (pub. 1961)
  for flute, oboe, clarinet, bassoon, 2 horns and percussion
- Sinfonietta for Wind Instruments and Percussion, Op. 97 (1964) (pub. 1967)
  for 2 flutes, 2 oboes, 2 clarinets, 2 bassoons, 2 horns, 2 trumpets and percussion

=== Piano ===
The music accompanying this molecular modelling piece is based on Toch's Burlesques for piano.

- Melodische Skizzen (Melodic Sketches), Op. 9 (1903) (pub. c. 1903–1905)
- Three Preludes, Op. 10 (c. 1903) (pub. unknown)
- Scherzo in B minor, original piano version, Op. 11 (1904) (pub. c. 1905)
- Stammbuchverse (Album Verses), Op. 13 (1905) (pub. 1905)
- Begegnung (Meeting) (1908) (Unpublished)
- Reminiszenzen (Reminiscences), Op. 14 (1909) (pub. 1909)
- Canon (Aus Dem ‘Tagebuch) (1914) (pub. 1915)
- Burlesken (Burlesques), Op. 31 (1923) (pub. 1924)
  - Gemächlich
  - Lebhaft
  - "Der Jongleur" - Watch at Welte-Mignon Recording # 4106
- Three Piano Pieces, Op. 32 (1924) (pub. 1925)
- Capriccetti, Op. 36 (1925) (pub. 1925)
- Tanz-und-Spielstücke (Pieces for Dancing and Playing), Op. 40 (c. 1926) (pub. 1927)
- Sonata for Piano, Op. 47 (1928) (pub. 1928)
- Kleinstadtbilder (Echoes From a Small Town), 14 Moderately Easy Piano Pieces, Op. 49 (1929) (pub. 1929)
- 5 × 10 Etudes, Op. 55–59 (1931) (pub. 1931)
- Profiles, Op. 68 (1946) (pub. 1948)
- Ideas, Op. 69 (1946) (pub. 1947)
- Diversions, Op. 78a (1956) (pub. 1958)
- Sonatinetta, Op. 78b (1956) (pub. 1958)
- (Untitled canon) (1959) (Unpublished)
- Three Little Dances, Op. 85 (1961) (pub. 1962)
- Reflections, Op. 86 (1962) (pub. 1962)
- Sonata for Piano Four-Hands, Op. 87 (1962) (pub. 1963)

Toch's piano music has been recorded by Austrian pianist Anna Magdalena Kokits.

=== Other solo instrumental works ===
- Three Original Pieces for the Electric Welte-Mignon Piano (1926) (Unpublished)
- Studie, for mechanical organ (1927) (Unpublished)
- Two Études for Violoncello Solo (1930) (pub. 1931)

=== Operas ===
- Die Prinzessin auf der Erbse (The Princess and the Pea), Op. 43 (1927) (pub. 1927)
  Musical fairy tale in one act; text after H. C. Andersen by Benno Elkan; English and German versions exist
- Egon und Emilie (Edgar and Emily), Op. 46 (c. 1928) (pub. 1928)
  Chamber opera in one act; "Not a family drama" (Kein Familiendrama); text by Christian Morgenstern; English and German versions exist
- Der Fächer (The Fan), Op. 51 (1929 or 1930) (pub. 1930)
  Opera-capriccio in three acts; text by Ferdinand Lion. Der Fächer was rediscovered and produced for the first time since the 1930s by the Bielefeld Opera conducted by Geoffrey Moull in 1995.
- Scheherazade: The Last Tale (Das letzte Märchen), Op. 88 (1962) (pub. 1965)
  Opera in one act; text by Melchior Lengyel, English translation by Cornel Lengyel

=== Choral ===
- An mein Vaterland (To My Fatherland), Op. 23 (1913) (Unpublished)
  for large orchestra, organ, solo soprano, mixed chorus & boys’ chorus
- Gesprochene Musik (Speaking Music), (1930). Only No. 1 of 3 published:
- Geographical Fugue, for speaking chorus (1930) (pub. 1950) No. 1 of 3 from Gesprochene Musik
- Der Tierkreis (The Zodiac), for women's chorus (1930) (Nos. 1 and 2 pub. 1930; No. 3 unpublished)
- Das Wasser (The Water), Cantata after a text by A. Döblin, Op. 53 (1930) (pub. 1930)
  for tenor, baritone, narrator, chorus, flute, trumpet, percussion & strings
- Cantata of the Bitter Herbs, Op. 65 (1938) (pub.?)
  for solo soprano, alto, tenor & baritone, narrator, chorus & orchestra
- The Inner Circle, six a cappella choruses for mixed chorus, Op.67 (1945, revised 1953) (pub. 1953)
  Cui bono (Thomas Carlyle) / The Lamb (William Blake) / Extinguish my eyes (Rainer Maria Rilke) / O World, thou chosest not (George Santayana) / Have you not heard his silent step (Rabindranath Tagore) / 6. Goodbye, proud world (Ralph Waldo Emerson)
- Phantoms, Op.81 (1957) (pub.?)
  for male and female speakers, women's speaking chorus, flute, clarinet, vibraphone, xylophone, timpani & percussion
- Song of Myself, for mixed chorus (1961) (pub. 1961)
- Valse (Waltz), for speaking chorus & optional percussion (1961) (pub. 1962)

=== Other vocal works ===
- Ich wollt, ich wär ein fisch (I wish I were a fish), for high voice & piano (1920) (Unpublished)
- Die chinesische Flöte (The Chinese Flute), Op. 29 (1922) (pub. 1923)
  for soprano, 2 flutes, clarinet, bass clarinet, percussion, celesta & strings. Exists in German and English versions
- Nine Songs for Soprano and Piano, Op. 41 (1926) (pub. 1928). Exists in German and English versions
- Music for Orchestra and Baritone, Op. 60 (1931) (pub. 1932)
- Chansons sans paroles, for voice and piano (1940) (Unpublished)
- Poems to Martha, for medium voice & string quartet (1942) (pub. 1943)
- There Is a Season for Everything, for mezzo-soprano, flute, clarinet, violin & cello (c. 1953) (pub. 1953)
- Vanity of Vanities, for soprano, tenor, flute, clarinet, violin, viola & cello (1954) (pub.?)
- Lange schon haben meine Freunde versucht (My friends have long tried), for soprano & baritone (1958) (Unpublished)

=== Incidental music ===
- Der Kinder Neujahrstraum (The Children’s New Year’s Dream) (stage play), Op. 19, for solo soprano, alto, tenor & baritone, chorus & orchestra (1910)
- Anabasis (radio play), for flute, clarinet, 2 trumpets, trombone, tuba, percussion & chorus (1931)
- Im fernen Osten (In the Far East) (radio play), for flute, 2 trumpets in C, mandolin, guitar, 2 violins, viola, cello, percussion, chorus & male solo voice (1931)
- Die Heilige von U.S.A. (The Saint of the U.S.A.) (stage play), for wind ensemble, percussion, piano, harmonium, alto solo & chorus (1931)
- König Ödipus (Oedipus Rex) (radio play), for 2 clarinets, 2 trumpets, 2 trombones, percussion & strings (1931)
- Medea (radio play), for wind ensemble, percussion & speaking chorus (1931)
- Die Räuber (The Robbers) (radio play), for 2 trumpets in C, bass trumpet or trombone & percussion (1931)
- Die Rollen des Schauspielers Seami (The Roles of the Actor Seami) (radio play), for flute, clarinet, violin, banjo, guitar & percussion (1931)
- Turandot (radio play), for flute, clarinet, trumpet in C, cello, piano & percussion (1931)
- Uli Wittewüpp (stage play), for clarinet, trumpet, percussion, piano & strings (1931)
- Napoleon, oder die 100 Tage (Napoleon, or the 100 Days) (radio play) (1931 or 1932)
- Das Kirschblütenfest (The Cherry Blossom Festival) (stage play), for timpani, percussion, harmonium & strings (1927)
- The Gates of Carven Jade or The Garden of Jade (radio play), for flute, clarinet, banjo, guitar, violin & soprano solo (c. 1934)
- William Tell (stage play), for flute, 2 clarinets, bassoon, trumpet, horn, 2 trombones, percussion and chorus (1939)

All incidental music listed is unpublished except Das Kirschblütenfest (pub. 1927).

=== Film music ===
- Catherine the Great (composed 1933)
- The Private Life of Don Juan (composed 1934)
- Little Friend (composed 1934)
- Peter Ibbetson (composed 1935)
- Outcast (composed 1936)
- On Such a Night (composed 1937)
- The Rebel Son (1938)
- The Story of Alexander Graham Bell (composed 1939)
- The Cat and the Canary (composed 1939)
- The Ghost Breakers (composed 1940)
- Dr. Cyclops (composed 1940)
- Ladies in Retirement (composed 1941)
- First Comes Courage (composed 1943)
- None Shall Escape (composed 1943)
- Address Unknown (composed 1944)
- The Unseen (composed 1945)

=== Books ===
- Beiträge zur Stilkunde der Melodie (1921) – dissertation for Heidelberg University
- Melodielehre (1923) – based upon the dissertation
- The Shaping Forces in Music: An Inquiry into the Nature of Harmony, Melody, Counterpoint, Form (1948) – uses material from the dissertation
