= Mary Martin =

American singer and actress (1913–1990)

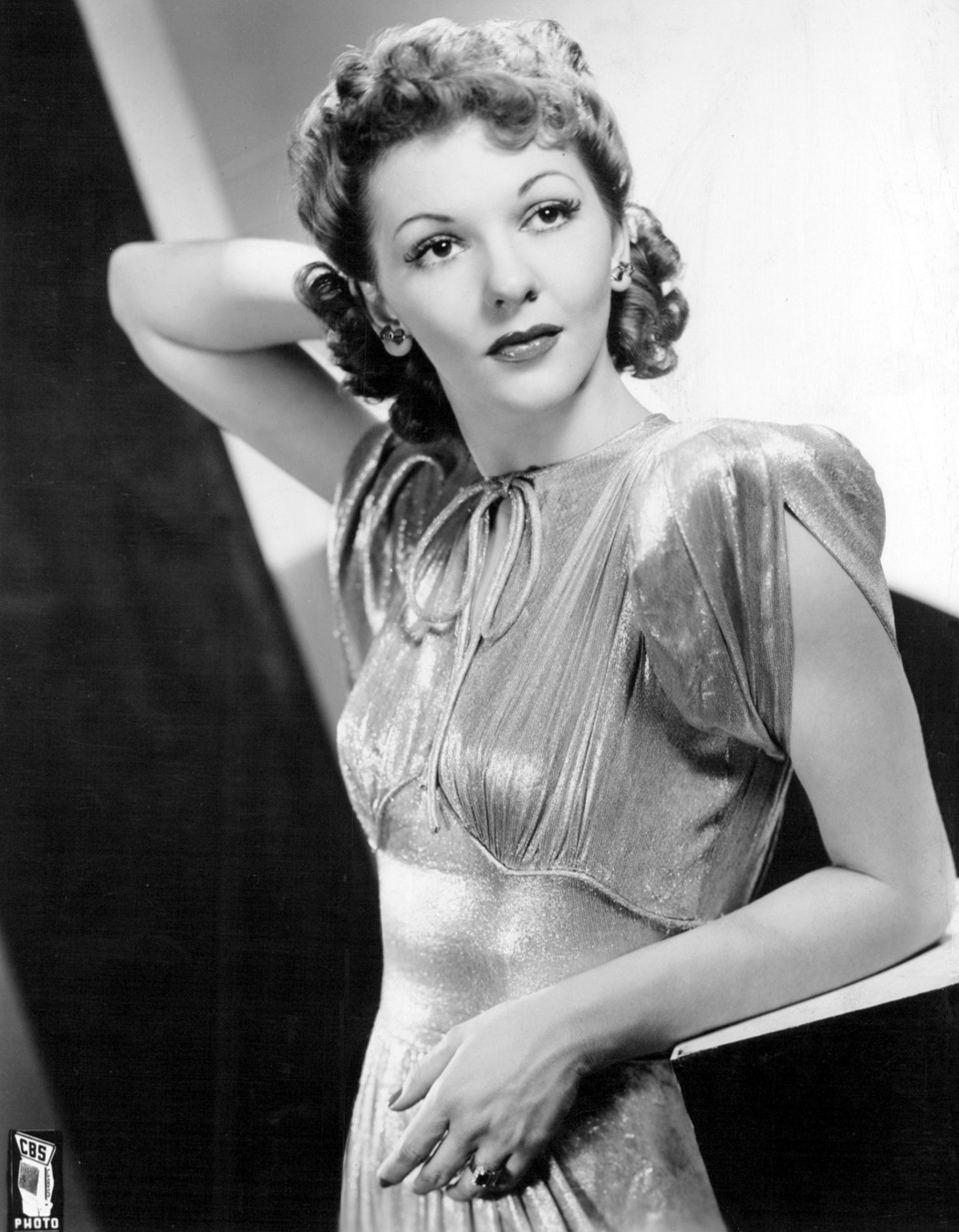
- Martin in 1939
- Born: Mary Virginia Martin; December 1, 1913; Weatherford, Texas, U.S.
- Died: November 3, 1990 (aged 76); Rancho Mirage, California, U.S.
- Resting place: Greenwood Cemetery, Weatherford, Texas
- Occupations: Actress; singer
- Years active: 1938–1985
- Spouses: Benjamin Hagman (m. 1930; div. 1936) Richard Halliday (m. 1940; died 1973)
- Children: 2, including Larry Hagman
- Awards: American Theater Hall of Fame; Hollywood Walk of Fame

Mary Virginia Martin (December 1, 1913 – November 3, 1990) was an American actress and singer. A muse of Rodgers and Hammerstein, she originated many leading roles on stage over her career, including Nellie Forbush in South Pacific (1949), the title character in Peter Pan (1954), and Maria von Trapp in The Sound of Music (1959). Over the course of her career, she won four Tony Awards and an Emmy Award. She was named a Kennedy Center Honoree in 1989. She was the mother of actor Larry Hagman.

== Early life ==
Martin was born in Weatherford, Texas. Her autobiography described her childhood as secure and happy. She had close relationships with both of her parents as well as her siblings. Her father, Preston Martin, was a lawyer, and her mother, Juanita Presley, was a violin teacher. Although the doctors told Juanita that she would risk her life if she attempted to have another baby, she was determined to have a boy. Instead, she had Mary, who became a tomboy.

Martin's family had a barn and orchard that kept her entertained. She played with her elder sister Geraldine (whom she called "Sister"), climbing trees and riding ponies. Martin adored her father. "He was tall, good-looking, silver-haired, with the kindest brown eyes. Mother was the disciplinarian, but it was Daddy who could turn me into an angel with just one look." Martin, who said "I'd never understand the law" began singing every Saturday night at a bandstand that was near the courtroom where her father worked. She sang in a trio with her sister and Marion Swofford, all three in bellhop costumes. "Even in those days, without microphones, my high piping voice carried all over the square. I have always thought that I inherited my carrying voice from my father."

She remembered having a photographic memory as a child. School tests were not a problem, and learning songs was easy. She had her first experience of singing solo at a fire hall, where she felt the crowd's appreciation. "Sometimes I think that I cheated my own family and my closest friends by giving to audiences so much of the love I might have kept for them. But that's the way I was made; I truly don't think I could help it." Martin's craft was developed by seeing movies and becoming a mimic. She would win prizes for looking, acting and dancing like Ruby Keeler and singing exactly like Bing Crosby. "Never, never, never can I say I had a frustrating childhood. It was all joy. Mother used to say she never had seen such a happy child — that I awakened each morning with a smile. I don't remember that, but I do remember that I never wanted to go to bed, to go to sleep, for fear I'd miss something."

== Marriage ==
During high school, Martin dated Benjamin Hagman before she left to attend finishing school at Ward–Belmont in Nashville, Tennessee. In Nashville she enjoyed imitating Fanny Brice at singing gigs, but she found school dull and felt confined by its strict rules. She was homesick for Weatherford, her family and Hagman. During a visit, Mary and Benjamin persuaded Mary's mother to allow them to marry. She was legally married on November 3, 1930, at Grace Episcopal Church (Hopkinsville, Kentucky). 10 months later, pregnant with her first child (Larry Hagman) she was forced to leave Ward–Belmont. She was, however, happy to begin her new life, but she soon learned that this life as she would later say was nothing but "role playing".

Their honeymoon was at her parents' house, and Martin's dream of life with a family and a white-picket fence faded. "I was 17, a married woman without real responsibilities, miserable about my mixed-up emotions, afraid there was something awfully wrong with me because I didn't enjoy being a wife. Worst of all, I didn't have enough to do." (p. 39) It was "Sister" who came to her rescue, suggesting that she should teach dance. "Sister" taught Martin her first real dance—the waltz clog. Martin perfectly imitated her first dance move, and she opened a dance studio. Here, she created her own moves, imitated the famous dancers she watched in the movies and taught "Sister's" waltz clog. As she later recalled, "I was doing something I wanted to do—creating."

== Apprenticeship ==
Wanting to learn more moves, Martin went to California to attend the dance school at the Franchon and Marco School of the Theatre and then opened her own dance studio in Mineral Wells, Texas. She was given a ballroom studio with the premise that she would sing in the lobby every Saturday. There, she learned how to sing into a microphone and how to phrase blues songs. One day at work, she accidentally walked into the wrong room, where auditions were being held. They asked her in what key she would like to sing "How Red the Rose, How Blue the Sky". Having absolutely no idea what her key was, she sang regardless and got the job.

Returning to California, Martin was hired to sing "How Red the Rose" at the Fox Theater in San Francisco followed by a gig at the Paramount Theater in Los Angeles. There was one catch: she had to sing in the wings. She scored her first professional gig unaware that she would soon be center stage.

Soon after, Martin learned that her studio in Texas had been burned down by a man who thought dancing was a sin. She began to express her unhappiness. Her father gave her advice, saying she was too young to be married. Martin left everything behind including her young son, Larry, and stayed in Los Angeles while her father handled her divorce from Benjamin Hagman for her. In Los Angeles, Martin plunged herself into auditions—so many that she became known as "Audition Mary". Her first professional audition and job was on a national radio network. Among Martin's first auditions, she sang "Indian Love Call". After she finished the song, "a tall, craggly man who looked like a mountain" told Martin that he thought she had something special. It was Oscar Hammerstein II This marked the start of her career.

== Radio ==
Martin began her radio career in 1939 as the vocalist on a short-lived revival of The Tuesday Night Party on CBS. In 1940, she was a singer on NBC's Good News of 1940, which was renamed Maxwell House Coffee Time during that year. In 1942, she joined the cast of Kraft Music Hall on NBC, replacing Connee Boswell. She was also one of the stars of Stage Door Canteen on CBS, 1942–1945.

== Broadway ==
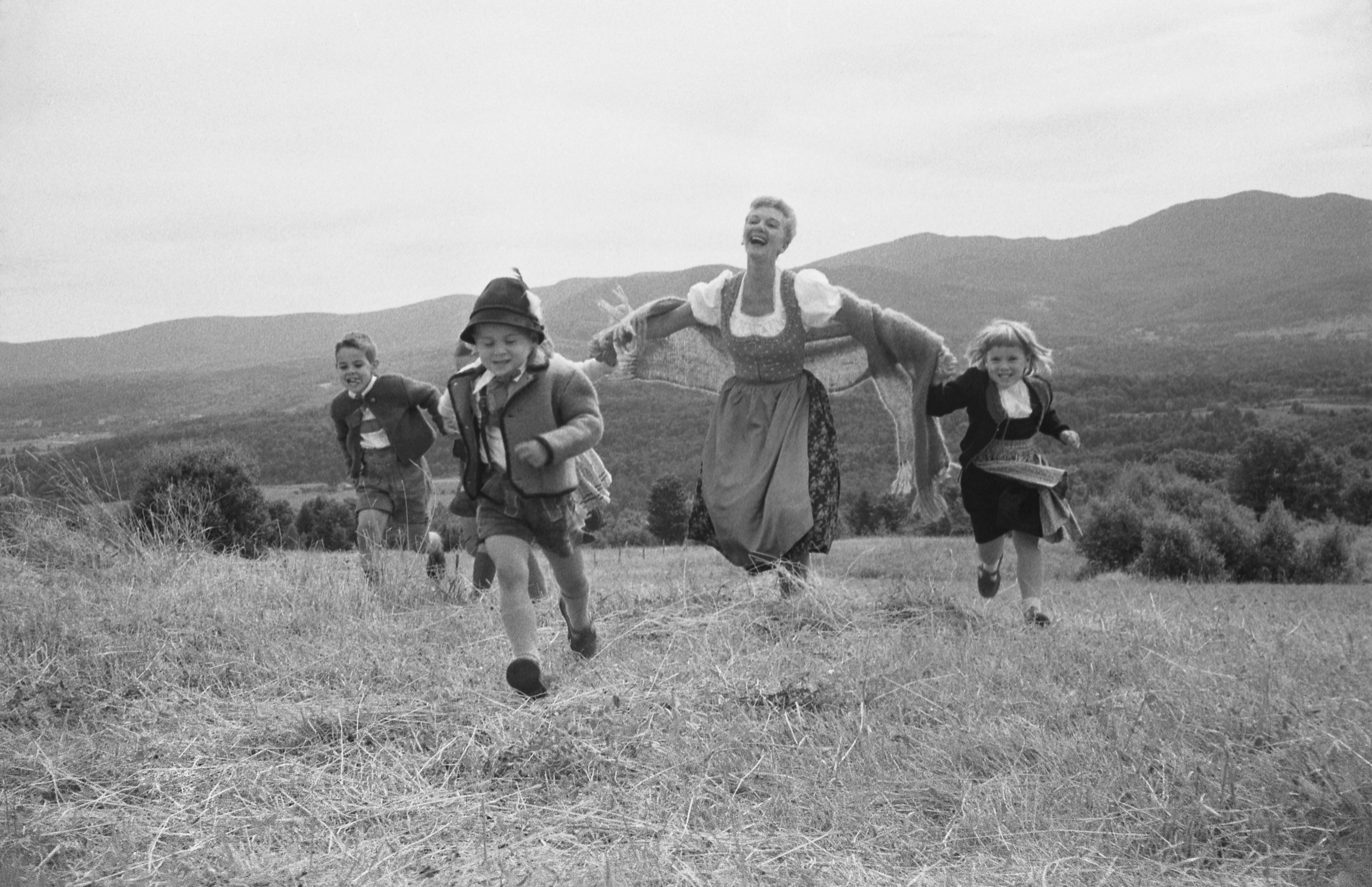
Martin in promotional photo for the original production of The Sound of Music

Martin was cast in Cole Porter's Leave It to Me!, making her Broadway debut in November 1938 in that production. She became popular on Broadway and received attention in the national media singing the spoof striptease song "My Heart Belongs to Daddy". With that one song in the second act, she became a star 'overnight'. Martin reprised the song in Night and Day, a Hollywood film about Cole Porter, in which she played herself auditioning for Porter (Cary Grant). "My Heart Belongs to Daddy" catapulted her career and became very special to Martin—she even sang it to her ailing father in his hospital bed while he was in a coma. Martin did not learn immediately that her father had died. Headlines read "Daddy Girl Sings About Daddy as Daddy Dies". Because of the show's demanding schedule, Martin was unable to attend her father's funeral. In 1943 she starred in the new Kurt Weill musical One Touch of Venus and then Lute Song in 1946.

As nurse Nellie Forbush, Martin opened on Broadway in South Pacific on April 7, 1949. Her performance was called "memorable ... funny and poignant in turns", and she earned a Tony Award. Richard Watts Jr. of the New York Post wrote: "nothing I have ever seen her do prepared me for the loveliness, humor, gift for joyous characterization, and sheer lovableness of her portrayal of Nellie Forbush .... Hers is a completely irresistible performance." She opened in the West End production on November 1, 1951.

Her next major success was in the role of Peter in the Broadway production of Peter Pan in October 1954 with Martin winning the Tony Award.

Martin opened on Broadway in The Sound of Music as Maria on November 16, 1959, and stayed in the show until October 1961. She won the Tony Award for Best Actress in a Musical. The musical gave Martin "the chance to display her homespun charm".

In 1966, she appeared on Broadway in the two-person musical I Do! I Do! with Robert Preston and was nominated for the Tony Award (Leading Actress in a Musical). A national tour with Preston began in March 1968 but was canceled early due to Martin's illness.

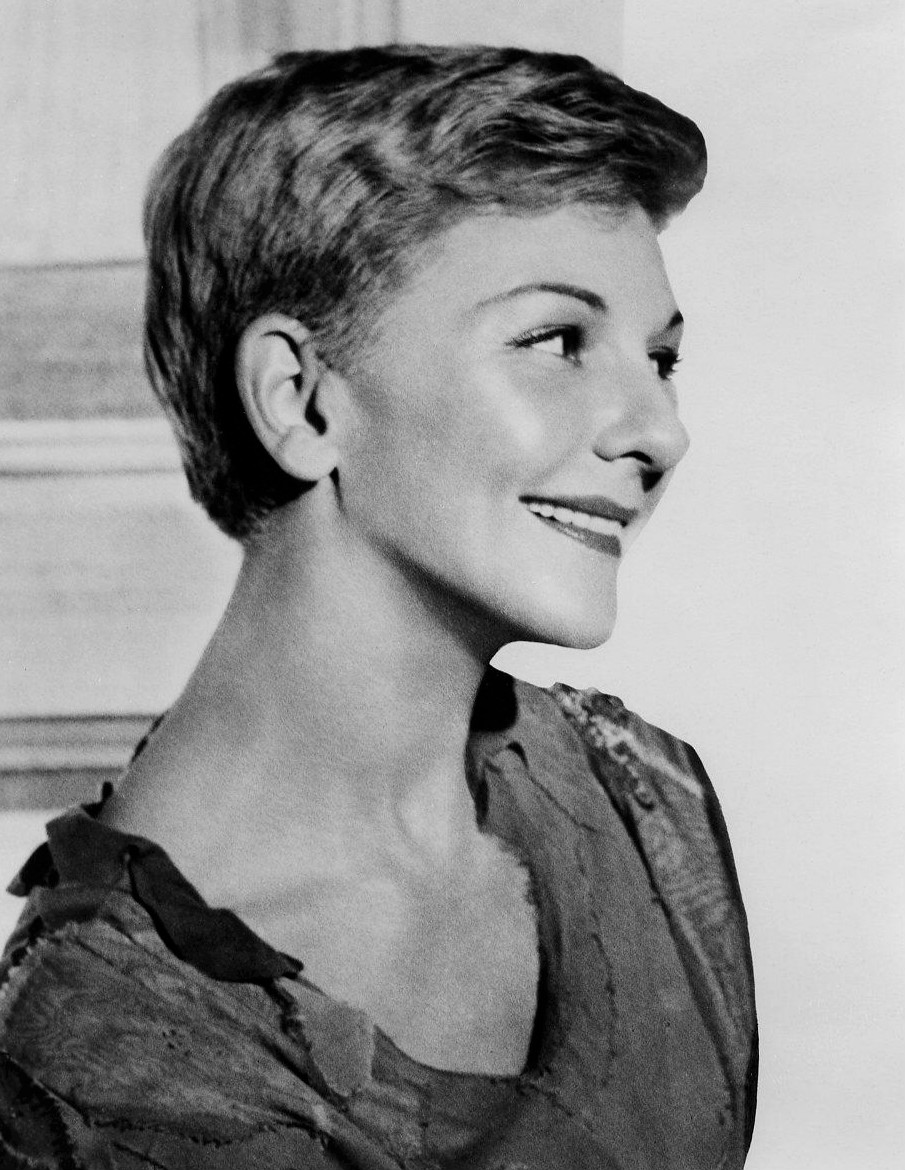
Martin portraying Peter Pan on stage, in 1954

Although she appeared in nine films between 1938 and 1943, she was generally passed over for the filmed version of the musical plays. She herself once explained that she did not enjoy making films because she did not have the connection with an audience that she had in live performances. The closest that she ever came to preserving her stage performances was her television appearances as Peter Pan. The Broadway production from 1954 was subsequently performed on NBC television in RCA's compatible color in 1955, 1956, and 1960. Martin also preserved her 1957 stage performance as Annie Oakley in Annie Get Your Gun when NBC television broadcast the production live that year.

While Martin did not enjoy making films, she frequently appeared on television. Her last feature film appearance was a cameo as herself in MGM's Main Street to Broadway in 1953. Martin made an appearance in 1980 in a Royal Variety Performance in London performing "Honey Bun" from South Pacific. Martin appeared in the play Legends with Carol Channing in a one-year US national tour opening in Dallas on January 9, 1986.

== Awards and honors ==
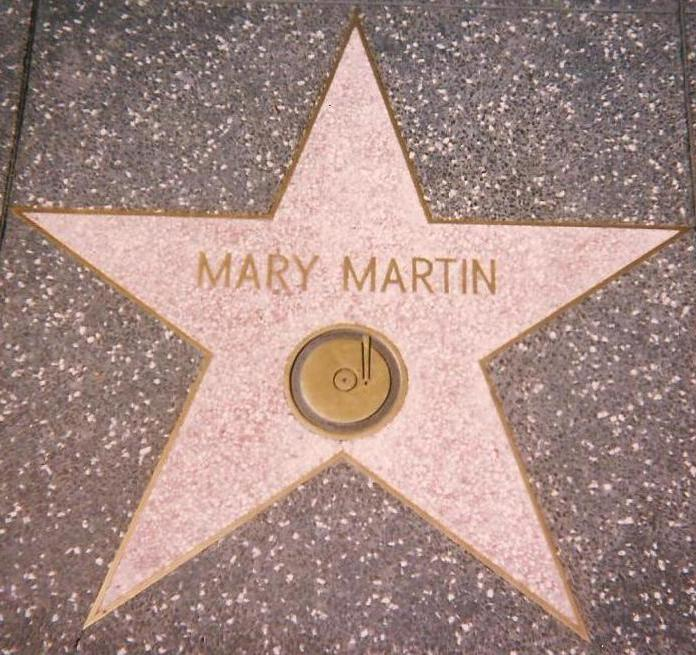
Star for Recording on the Hollywood Walk of Fame at 1560 Vine Street, Hollywood: She also has one for Radio at 6609 Hollywood Blvd.

Martin was inducted into the American Theater Hall of Fame in 1973. She received the Kennedy Center Honors, an annual honor for career achievements, in 1989. She received the Donaldson Award in 1943 for One Touch of Venus. A Special Tony Award was presented to her in 1948 while she appeared in the national touring company of Annie Get Your Gun for "spreading theatre to the rest of the country while the originals perform in New York." In 1955 and 1956, she received, first, a Tony Award for Peter Pan, and then an Emmy for appearing in the same role on television. She also received Tonys for South Pacific and in 1959 for The Sound of Music.

In September 1963, a statue of Peter Pan dedicated to her was unveiled in Weatherford, donated by the Peter Pan Peanut Butter Company.

== Personal life ==
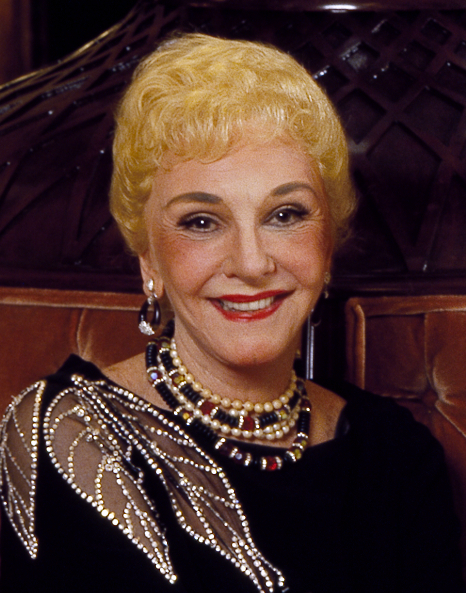
Martin in 1986

After Martin's 1936 divorce from Benjamin Hagman, she married Richard Halliday in 1940. Early in their marriage, he worked as a drama critic for the New York World-Telegram and a movie critic for the New York Daily News. Together they had one daughter, Heller Halliday, who was born on November 4, 1941. Eventually, Halliday became producer or co-producer of at least two of Martin's projects.

Cultural scholar Lillian Faderman wrote that Martin and actress Janet Gaynor often traveled together along with their husbands.

Gaynor and her husband discovered Anápolis in 1950, soon after, Martin and her husband visited. Martin and Janet Gaynor had adjoining ranches near Anápolis, Goiás, Brazil.

The Jack Paar Program (1962-1965) showed film from Martin at her ranch near Anápolis, Goiás, Brazil.

In the early 1970s, the couple lived, according to his March 1973 obituary in the Connecticut Sunday Herald, "on a vast ranch they own near Anápolis" in the state of Goiás, Brazil. The ranch was called "Nossa Fazenda Halliday" (Our Halliday Farm). Martin was called Dona Maria by people in the vicinity of the Brazilian ranch.

On the evening of September 5, 1982, Martin, Janet Gaynor, Gaynor's husband Paul Gregory, and Martin's manager Ben Washer were involved in a serious car crash in San Francisco. A van ran a red light at the corner of California and Franklin streets and crashed into the Luxor taxicab in which the group was riding, knocking it into a tree. Washer was killed, Martin sustained two broken ribs and a broken pelvis, and Gregory suffered two broken legs. Gaynor sustained several serious injuries. The driver of the van was arrested on two counts of felony drunk driving, reckless driving, speeding, running a red light, and vehicular homicide. On March 15, 1983, he was found guilty of drunk driving and vehicular homicide and was sentenced to three years in prison. Gaynor died in September of 1984 from her injuries.

Martin's sexuality has long been a topic of debate. In 1979, Patsy Kelly told Boze Hadleigh that Martin was a lesbian. In 2016, biographer David Kaufman stated that Halliday served as "[Martin's] husband, her best friend, her gay/straight 'cover,'" while in 2019, The Advocate stated that Martin "simply [was the subject of] a lifetime of lavender rumors."

=== Death ===
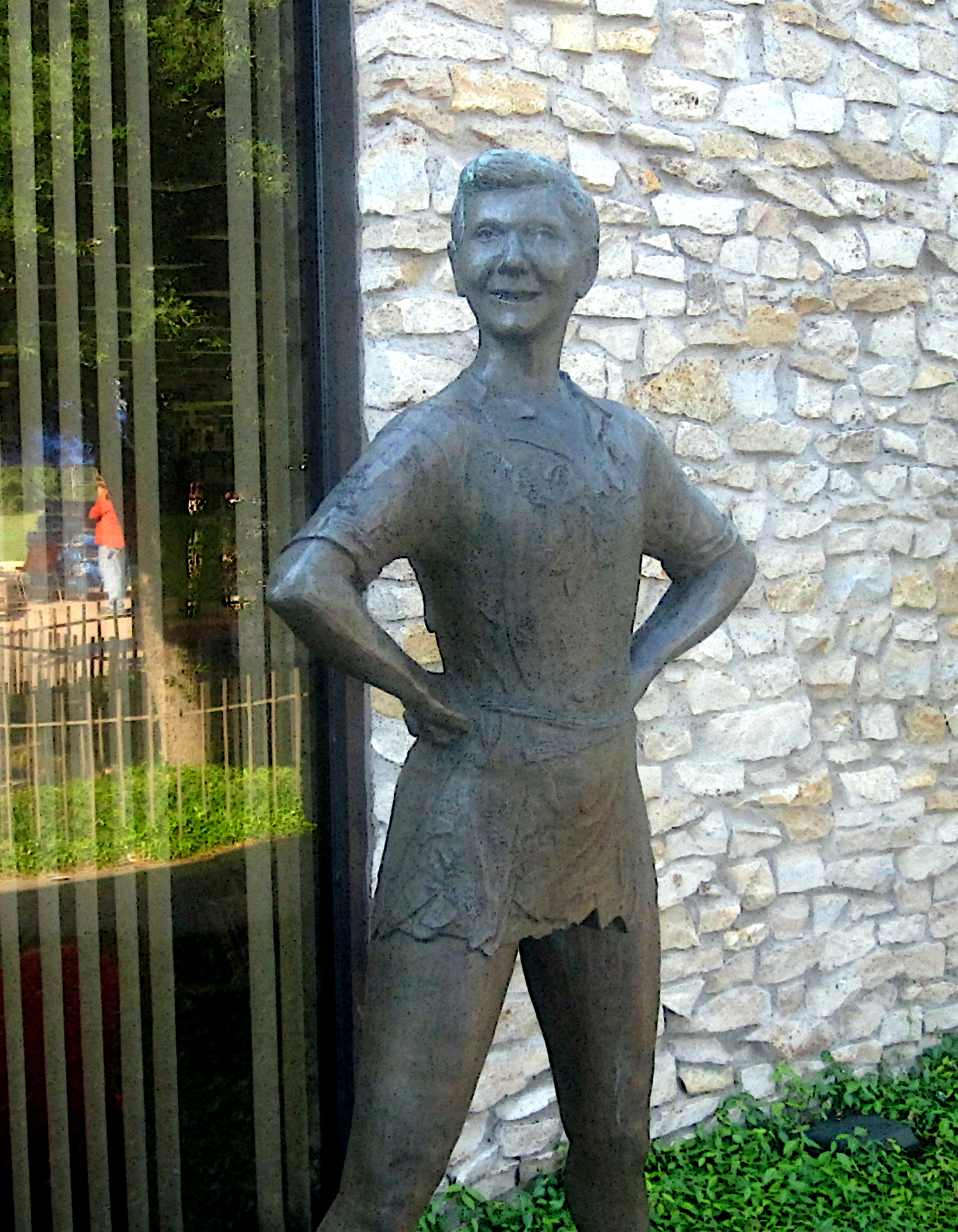
Peter Pan statue in Martin's hometown of Weatherford in Parker County, Texas

Martin died of cancer at age 76 at her home in Rancho Mirage, California, on November 3, 1990. She was cremated at Neptune Society in Riverside, California. Her urn is buried at City Greenwood Cemetery in her native Weatherford, Texas.

== Work ==
=== Stage ===
- Leave It to Me! (1938)
- Nice Goin'! (1939)
- One Touch of Venus (1943–1945)
- Pacific 1860 (1946)
- Lute Song (1946)
- Annie Get Your Gun (1947)
- South Pacific (1949–1951)
- Kind Sir (1953)
- Peter Pan (1954)
- The Skin of Our Teeth (1955)
- Annie Get Your Gun (1957) 10 weeks Los Angeles and San Francisco
- South Pacific (1957) 10 weeks touring Los Angeles and San Francisco
- Music with Mary Martin (1958)
- The Sound of Music (1959)
- Jennie (1963)
- Hello, Dolly! (1965–1966) US Tour, Asia and for 6 months in London
- I Do! I Do! (1966–1969) One year on Broadway, nearly one year on tour
- A Celebration of Richard Rodgers (1972)
- Together on Broadway: Mary Martin & Ethel Merman (1977)
- Do You Turn Somersaults? (1978)
- Our Heart Belongs To Mary (1983); 1 performance only at the Shubert Theater on Broadway
- Legends (1985–1987)

=== Film ===
- The Shopworn Angel (1938) (dubbed singing voice of Margaret Sullavan)
- Battle of Broadway (1938) (dubbed singing voice of Gypsy Rose Lee)
- The Great Victor Herbert (1939) - Louise Hall
- Fashion Horizons (1940, Short subject) - Herself
- Rhythm on the River (1940) - Cherry Lane
- Love Thy Neighbor (1940) - Mary Allen
- Kiss the Boys Goodbye (1941) - Cindy Lou Bethany
- Birth of the Blues (1941) - Betty Lou Cobb
- New York Town (1941) - Alexandra Curtis
- Star Spangled Rhythm (1942) - Herself - 'Hit the Road to Dreamland' Number
- Happy Go Lucky (1943) - Marjory Stuart
- True to Life (1943) - Bonnie Porter
- Night and Day (1946) - Herself
- Main Street to Broadway (1953) - Herself

=== Television ===
- America Applauds: An Evening for Richard Rodgers (1951)
- The Ford 50th Anniversary Show (1953) (song medley duet with Ethel Merman, aired on NBC and CBS)
- General Foods 25th Anniversary Show: A Salute to Rodgers and Hammerstein (March 28, 1954) (aired on all networks)
- Noël Coward & Mary Martin – Together With Music (1955, CBS)
- Producers' Showcase: Peter Pan (twice, in 1955 and 1956)
- Annie Get Your Gun (1957)
- Magic with Mary Martin (1959)
- Peter Pan (1960)
- The Bing Crosby Show for Clairol (1962)
- Mary Martin: Hello, Dolly! Round the World (1966)
- Mary Martin at Eastertime (1966)
- Valentine (1979)
- Over Easy (host from 1981 to 1983)
- Rodgers and Hammerstein: The Sound of American Music (1985)

== Radio appearances ==
Year	Program	Episode/source
1942	Kraft Music Hall	resident singer
1943	Stage Door Canteen	Curtain Up for Victory
1943	Philip Morris Playhouse	Roberta

== Recordings ==
Albums

Mary Martin in an Album of Cole Porter Songs (1940)
One Touch of Venus (1944)
Lute Song (1946)
Mary Martin Sings for You (1949)
South Pacific (1949)
Anything Goes (1950)
The Bandwagon (1950)
Babes in Arms (1951)
Girl Crazy (1952)
Peter Pan (1954)
Annie Get Your Gun (1957)
Walt Disney’s Story of Sleeping Beauty (1958)
Mary Martin Sings – Richard Rodgers Plays (1958)
Hi-Ho (1958)
Mary Martin Sings a Musical Love Story (1959)
The Sound of Music (1959)
Rodgers and Hammerstein’s Cinderella (1959)
The Little Lame Lamb, A Christmas Story of St. Francis (1960)
Guideposts for Living (1962)
Jennie – The Original Broadway Cast (1963)
Hello, Dolly! (1965)
I Do! I Do! (1966)
Mary Martin Tells the Story and Sings the Songs of Rodgers and Hammerstein’s The Sound of Music (1966)

Hit singles
My Heart Belongs to Daddy (1939, #2)
The Waiter and the Porter and the Upstairs Maid (with Bing Crosby and Jack Teagarden, 1941, #23)
Pound Your Table Polka (1942, #22)
I'll Walk Alone (1944, #6)
Almost Like Being in Love (1947, #21)
Go to Sleep, Go to Sleep, Go to Sleep (with Arthur Godfrey, 1950. #8)
