= Noël Coward at Las Vegas =

Live album by Noël Coward
- Released: 1955
- Recorded: June 1955
- Studio: Desert Inn, Las Vegas Strip, Paradise, Nevada
- Genre: Traditional pop
- Length: 44:33
- Label: Columbia
- Producer: Dan O'Leary

Noël Coward chronology
Noël Coward at Las Vegas (1955)	Together with Music (1956)

Professional ratings
Review scores
Source	Rating
AllMusic	4.5/5 stars

Noël Coward at Las Vegas is a 1955 live album by Noël Coward.

This was Coward's first appearance on the Las Vegas Strip, with Coward claiming that the dates gave him "one of the most sensational successes of my career, and to pretend that I am not absolutely delighted would be idiotic." Life magazine wrote that Coward was paid $40,000 per week for the engagements. Coward was accompanied by Peter Matz, who also provided the orchestrations, Matz arranged Coward's next live album, Noël Coward in New York.

The album reached No. 14 on the Billboard albums chart.

== Track listing ==
1. Noël Coward Medley ("I'll See You Again", "Dance Little Lady", "Poor Little Rich Girl", "A Room With A View", "Someday I'll Find You", "I'll Follow My Secret Heart", "If Love Were All", "Play, Orchestra, Play") – 5:19
2. "Uncle Harry" – 3:45
3. "Loch Lomond" (Traditional) – 2:28
4. "A Bar on the Piccola Marina" – 4:48
5. "World Weary" – 3:11
6. "Nina" (Coward, Cole Porter) – 4:22
7. "Mad Dogs and Englishmen" – 3:14
8. "Matelot" – 4:35
9. "Alice Is At It Again" – 3:33
10. "A Room with a View" – 3:04
11. "Let's Do It, Let's Fall in Love" (Porter) – 4:30
12. "The Party's Over Now" – 1:44

All music and lyrics written by Noël Coward unless otherwise indicated.

== Personnel ==
- Noël Coward – vocal
- Peter Matz – piano, arranger
