= Camillo Togni =

Italian composer

Camillo Togni (18 October 1922 – 28 November 1993) was an Italian composer, teacher, and pianist. Coming from a family of independent means, he was able to pursue his art as he saw fit, regardless of changing fashions or economic pressure.

== Life ==
Togni was born in Gussago, near Brescia. He began studying piano at the age of 7, with Franco Margola in Brescia, then from 1939 to 1943 with Alfredo Casella in Rome and Siena, and Giovanni Anfossi in Milan. Later he studied with Arturo Benedetti Michelangeli, receiving his diploma from the Conservatory of Parma in 1946.

He studied Classics in Brescia, musical aesthetics at the University of Milan, and in 1948 graduated in philosophy from the University of Pavia with a dissertation titled “The Aesthetics of B. Croce and the Problem of Musical Interpretation”. Contemporaneously, he began to study composition in Brescia with Margola, subsequently in Rome and in Siena with Casella. He was active as a concert artist until 1953; subsequently, he performed only his own music in public.

Michelangeli introduced him in 1938 to the music of Arnold Schoenberg, which affected him profoundly and caused him to develop a tremendous interest in the Second Viennese School. During the war, he gained access to Schoenberg's scores through Luigi Rognoni, with whom he was studying. By 1940, Schoenberg's influence was clearly at work in Togni's Prima serenata for piano, and his new-found technique came to full flower in the Variazioni for piano and orchestra (1945–46), with which he made his compositional debut at the 1946 Venice Festival of Contemporary Music. In 1949, together with Luigi Dallapiccola and Bruno Maderna, he addressed the First International Dodecaphonic Congress in Milan. From 1951 to 1957 he attended the Ferienkurse in Darmstadt, but he found the turn toward aleatoricism there, beginning in 1957, alien to his nature, and did not return until he was invited back in 1990.

From 1960 to 1961, he taught courses on contemporary music at the University for Foreigners in Florence. From 1977 to 1988 he held the chair of the Advanced Course in composition at the Conservatory in Parma. Starting in 1989 he taught the special courses in composition at the School of Music in Fiesole.

Amongst the most widely admired works from his post-Darmstadt period are the Charles d'Orléans settings, Rondeaux per dieci (1963–64), which acquires a "torpid expressivity" through the juxtaposition of the coolness of an extremely high lyrical soprano voice and the resonance of the instrumental bass register. It was awarded the 1965 ISCM Prize for chamber music. His last project was a trilogy of operas on texts by Georg Trakl, a poet whose works had engaged Togni's attention since 1955. The first part, Blaubart, was composed between 1972 and 1975, and the second part, Barrabas, between 1981 and 1985. However, the planned third part, Maria Magdalena, remained unwritten at the time of his death in Brescia in 1993.

Togni's music can be heard in labels such as Naxos, Stradivarius, and Bongiovanni.

== Principal works ==
- Variazioni, for piano and orchestra, Op. 27 (1946)
- Tre capricci, for piano, Op. 38 (1954–57)
- Fantasia concertante, for flute and strings (1957)
- Helian di Trakl, cycle of five Lieder for soprano and chamber ensemble (words of Georg Trakl) (1955)
- Gesang zur Nacht, for contralto and instrumental ensemble (words of Georg Trakl) (1962)
- Recitativo for tape (1961)
- Rondeaux per dieci, for soprano and instrumental ensemble (words of Charles d'Orleans) (1963)
- Three Preludes for harpsichord (1963–75)
- Quarto Capriccio, for piano (1969)
- Blaubart, lyric opera (1972–75) (a companion piece to Duke Bluebeard's Castle)
- Für Herbert, for two violins, viola, and harpsichord (1976)
- Some other where, for orchestra (1977)
- String Trio, for violin, viola and cello (1978)
- Quasi una serenata, for guitar (1979)
- Barrabas, lyric opera (1981–85)
- Permaila for flute and piano (1982)
- Quinto Capriccio, for piano (1987)
- Sesto Capriccio, for piano (1991)
- Concerto for piano and orchestra (1989–93, unfinished; completed 2004 by Paulo de Assis)

== Sources ==
- Anon. n.d.""Camillo Togni: Biography"". Archived from the original on 2007-09-27. . Italian Composers Website.
- Bortolotto, Mario. 1964. "Italy: New Music at Palermo", translated by David L. Burrows. Perspectives of New Music 2, no. 2 (Spring–Summer): 159–63.
- Osmond-Smith, David. 2001. "Togni, Camillo." The New Grove Dictionary of Music and Musicians, edited by Stanley Sadie and John Tyrrell. London: Macmillan Publishers.
