= Deaths in May 2007 =

The following is a list of notable deaths in May 2007.

Entries for each day are listed alphabetically by surname. A typical entry lists information in the following sequence:

- Name, age, country of citizenship at birth, subsequent country of citizenship (if applicable), reason for notability, cause of death (if known), and reference.

== May 2007 ==
=== 1 ===
- Wiley Harker, 92, American actor (The Straight Story, City Heat, Things to Do in Denver When You're Dead).
- Temira Pachmuss, 79, Russian-American philologist.
- Winifred Pennington, 91, British limnologist.
- Fermín Trueba, 92, Spanish road cyclist.

=== 2 ===
- Phillip Carter, 44, British businessman, founder of Carter & Carter, helicopter crash.
- Maurice Jacob, 74, French theoretical particle physicist.
- Abdul Sabur Farid Kohistani, 54–55, Afghan legislator and Prime Minister (1992), assassination by gunshot.
- Brad McGann, 43, New Zealand film director (In My Father's Den), cancer.
- Juan Valdivieso, 96, Peruvian football goalkeeper and manager, heart failure.

=== 3 ===
- Alex Agase, 85, Iranian-born American football player (Cleveland Browns), and coach (Northwestern Wildcats, Purdue Boilermakers).
- Bart Bongers, 60, Dutch Olympic water polo player (1968).
- J. Robert Bradley, 87, American gospel singer, diabetes.
- Leonard Eron, 87, American psychologist, congestive heart failure.
- Warja Lavater, 93, Swiss artist and illustrator.
- Pat O'Shea, 76, Irish writer.
- Wally Schirra, 84, American astronaut in Mercury, Gemini, and Apollo projects, heart attack.
- Knock Yokoyama, 75, Japanese comedian and politician, throat cancer.
- Mamadou Zaré, 42, Ivorian footballer.

=== 4 ===
- Danilo Fioravanti, 93, Italian Olympic gymnast (1936, 1948).
- Russell W. Kruse, 85, American auctioneer, stroke.
- Jeremias Nguenha, 35, Mozambican political musician who sang in Shangaan.
- José Antonio Roca, 78, Mexican football player and manager.
- Gábor Takács, 47, Hungarian Olympic sprint canoer.

=== 5 ===
- Prince Abdul Majeed bin Abdulaziz Al Saud, 64–65, Saudi politician, governor of Mecca.
- José Aponte de la Torre, 65, Puerto Rican mayor, respiratory complications.
- Tom Hutchinson, 65, American football player (Cleveland Browns, Atlanta Falcons).
- Theodore Maiman, 79, American physicist who built the first laser, systemic mastocytosis.
- Anthony Mitchell, 39–40, British journalist, plane crash.
- Edwin H. Simmons, 85, American Marine Corps historian.
- Gusti Wolf, 95, Austrian actress.
- John Zamet, 74, British periodontist.

=== 6 ===
- Alvin Batiste, 74, American jazz musician, heart attack.
- Carey Bell, 70, American blues harmonica player, heart failure.
- Lesley Blanch, 102, British writer and fashion editor.
- Enéas Carneiro, 68, Brazilian politician, leukemia.
- Tamás Gábor, 75, Hungarian Olympic fencer (1960, 1964).
- Curtis Harrington, 80, American film director.
- Kazuo Kitamura, 80, Japanese actor (Tora! Tora! Tora!, Black Rain, Shinobi: Heart Under Blade), pneumonia.
- Maurice Marsac, 92, French actor (King of Kings, The Jerk, Robert Kennedy and His Times), cardiac arrest.
- Đorđe Novković, 63, Croatian songwriter.
- Bernard Weatherill, Baron Weatherill, 86, English Speaker of the British House of Commons (1983–1992), after short illness.

=== 7 ===
- Isabella Blow, 48, British fashion journalist and stylist, suicide by poisoning.
- Quentin Brooks, 86, American Olympic shooter (1948).
- Fulton Burley, 84, Canadian performer, heart failure.
- Diego Corrales, 29, American world champion boxer, motorcycle accident.
- Shirl Conway, 90, American actress.
- George Dawson, 45, British politician, Northern Ireland Assembly member, cancer.
- Donald Ginsberg, 73, American physicist, melanoma.
- Tomasi Kulimoetoke II, 88, Wallisian King of Wallis ('Uvea).
- Raffi Lavie, 70, Israeli artist, pancreatic cancer.
- Emma Lehmer, 100, Russian-born American mathematician.
- Sonny Myers, 83, American professional wrestler.
- Octavian Paler, 81, Romanian writer and journalist, heart attack.
- Nicholas Worth, 69, American actor (Darkman, Heartbreak Ridge, Night Court), heart failure.
- Yahweh ben Yahweh, 71, American religious cult leader (Nation of Yahweh) and convicted felon, prostate cancer.

=== 8 ===
- Lloyd Ailsby, 89, Canadian ice hockey player (New York Rangers).
- Mark Burns, 71, English actor (Exodus, House of the Living Dead, By the Sword Divided), cancer.
- Philip R. Craig, 74, American mystery writer.
- Velma Dunn, 88, American Olympic diver (1936), stroke.
- Abdullah bin Faisal Al Saud, 85, Saudi prince, writer and businessman, after long illness.
- David Farquhar, 79, New Zealand composer.
- Len Fenton, 78, Australian Olympic sailor (1948).
- John Henry, 68, British toxicologist, haemorrhage.
- René Lamps, 91, French politician.
- Jim Richards, 79, Australian rugby league player (South Sydney, Newtown).
- Jagdish Narain Sapru, 74, Indian former chairman of ITC Limited and BOC India.
- Carson Whitsett, 62, American composer, musician and record producer, brain tumor.

=== 9 ===
- Donald Alexander, 79, Scottish medical researcher.
- Charlie Ane Jr., 76, American football player (Detroit Lions), pneumonia.
- Alfred D. Chandler Jr., 88, American economic historian.
- Gino Pariani, 79, American soccer player (1950 World Cup), bone cancer.
- George Seddon, 80, Australian environmental scholar.
- Dwight Wilson, 106, Canadian centenarian, second-to-last surviving World War I veteran.
- Philip Workman, 53, American convicted murderer, execution by lethal injection.

=== 10 ===
- Dale Atkeson, 76, American football player (Washington Redskins).
- John K. Lattimer, 92, American urologist who developed a cure for renal tuberculosis.
- Sir Oliver Millar, 84, British Surveyor of the Queen's Pictures (1972–1988) and Director of the Royal Collection (1987–1988).
- Robert Oelman, 97, American chief executive of NCR Corporation (1962–1973), co-founder of Wright State University.
- Chuck Riley, 66, American voice actor.

=== 11 ===
- Henry Duys Jr., 82, American Olympic sailor (1948).
- Norman Frank, 82, American producer and political strategist.
- Bernard Gordon, 88, American screenwriter, named on the Hollywood blacklist, cancer.
- Stanley Holden, 79, British ballet dancer, complications from heart problems and colon cancer.
- Chief Stephen Osita Osadebe, 71, Nigerian Igbo highlife musician.
- Malietoa Tanumafili II, 94, Samoan politician, head of state.

=== 12 ===
- Mullah Dadullah, 41, Afghan militant, Taliban military commander, shot.
- Teddy Infuhr, 70, American child actor.
- Kai Johansen, 66, Danish footballer (Greenock Morton F.C. and Rangers), cancer.
- Henri Klein, 87, French Olympic middle-distance runner (1948).
- Edy Vásquez, 23, Honduran footballer, car accident.

=== 13 ===
- Zaka Ullah Bhangoo, 58–59, Pakistani army brigadier general and aviator, plane crash.
- Alexander Buchanan Campbell, 92, Scottish architect.
- Chen Xiaoxu, 41, Chinese actress (Dream of the Red Mansion) and Buddhist nun, breast cancer.
- Mendel Jackson Davis, 64, American politician, U.S. Representative from South Carolina (1971–1981), emphysema.
- Gomer Hodge, 63, American baseball player (Cleveland Indians), amyotrophic lateral sclerosis.
- Kai Johansen, 66, Danish footballer.
- Luis María Mendía, 82, Argentine naval officer.
- Kate Webb, 64, New Zealand journalist and foreign correspondent, bowel cancer.

=== 14 ===
- Orlando Bobo, 33, American-born Canadian football player (Winnipeg Blue Bombers), heart and liver failure.
- Ülo Jõgi, 86, Estonian anti-communist.
- Sir Edward Jones, 70, British Army general, Black Rod (1996–2001), heart attack.
- Nancy McDonald, 72, American politician, member of the Texas House of Representatives (1984–1995), ovarian cancer.
- Aaron McMillan, 30, Australian classical pianist, bone cancer.
- Jean Saubert, 65, American dual medalist in slalom (1964 Winter Olympics), breast cancer.
- Sir Colin St John Wilson, 85, British architect, designer of the British Library.

=== 15 ===
- Richard Bordewick, 68, Canadian Olympic rower (1964).
- Giorgio Cavaglieri, 95, Italian-born American architect, founder of New York City's urban preservation movement.
- Jerry Falwell, 73, American minister, television evangelist, and conservative activist, founder of the Moral Majority, cardiac arrhythmia.
- Karen Hess, 88, American culinary historian and author, stroke.
- John Hurst, 83, American Olympic sports shooter (1960).
- Yolanda King, 51, American activist and actress, daughter and first-born child of civil rights leader Martin Luther King Jr.
- Duncan Macrae, 92, British rugby football player, (Scotland Rugby Union Team).
- Angus McBride, 76, British illustrator.
- Lauren Terrazzano, 39, American journalist, chronicled her battle with cancer, lung cancer.

=== 16 ===
- Alphonse "Bois Sec" Ardoin, 91, American creole accordionist.
- Dame Mary Douglas, 86, British social anthropologist.
- Gohar Gasparyan, 83, Armenian soprano opera singer.
- Allan Hird Sr., 88, Australian footballer and academic, President of Essendon Football Club (1969–1975), Victorian Director-general of Education.
- Peter Marner, 71, British cricketer, youngest player to represent the Lancashire County Cricket Club.
- C. Timothy O'Meara, 64, American film editor (The Rose, Hoosiers, Conan the Barbarian).
- Terry Ryan, 60, American writer (The Prize Winner of Defiance, Ohio), cancer.

=== 17 ===
- Lloyd Alexander, 83, American author (The Chronicles of Prydain), cancer.
- Petro Balabuyev, 76, Ukrainian aircraft designer, including world's largest aeroplane, the An-225.
- Don Burton, 87, Australian politician, member of the New South Wales Legislative Council (1976–1984).
- Baruch Feinberg, 73, Israeli javelin thrower and Olympian (1960).
- Egmont Foregger, 84, Austrian jurist, official and politician, severe illness.
- John Gonzaga, 74, American football player with the San Francisco 49ers, Dallas Cowboys, Detroit Lions and Denver Broncos.
- Kawika Kapahulehua, 76, American captain of the Hokulea's first voyage from Hawaii to Tahiti.
- Sir John Nicholls, 80, British air marshal.
- Eugen Weber, 82, Romanian-born American historian, pancreatic cancer.
- Bill Wight, 85, American MLB pitcher and scout.
- Wiktor Zin, 82, Polish architect and graphic artist.

=== 18 ===
- Alan Bannister, 84, English cyclist and Olympian (1948, 1952).
- Roy De Forest, 77, American artist and professor at University of California, Davis.
- Nikolai Galushkin, 85, Soviet military sniper
- Pierre-Gilles de Gennes, 74, French physicist who won the Nobel Prize for Physics in 1991.
- Cornelius R. Hager, 93, American educator, President of Asbury University.
- Saud Memon, 44, Pakistani businessman implicated in the murder of Daniel Pearl, tuberculosis and meningitis.
- Les Schwab, 89, American tire tycoon.
- Mika Špiljak, 90, Croatian politician, chairman of the Collective Presidency of Yugoslavia (1983–1984).
- Yoyoy Villame, 69, Filipino musician and comedian, heart attack.

=== 19 ===
- Bernard Blaut, 67, Polish footballer and manager.
- Derek Cooper, 94, British army officer and refugee campaigner.
- Miroslav Deronjić, 52, Bosnian Serb politician and convicted war criminal, natural causes.
- Willie Ferguson, 67, South African racing driver.
- Jack Findlay, 72, Australian Grand Prix motorcycle racer.
- Frank Guida, 84, Italian-born American record producer.
- Ron Hall, 43, American football player (Tampa Bay Buccaneers, Detroit Lions).
- Marian Radke-Yarrow, 89, American researcher in child psychology, leukemia.
- Scott Thorkelson, 49, Canadian member of the House of Commons (1988–1993), heart attack.
- Michel Visi, 52, Vanuatuan Catholic bishop.
- Hans Wollschläger, 72, German author and translator.
- Carl Wright, 75, American actor (Big Momma's House, Barbershop, Soul Food), cancer.

=== 20 ===
- Bobby Ash, 82, British-born Canadian television host (The Uncle Bobby Show), heart attack.
- Dame Jean Herbison, 84, New Zealand academic, first N.Z. female chancellor (University of Canterbury, 1979–1984).
- Baruch Kimmerling, 67, Israeli sociologist and historian.
- Valentina Leontyeva, 84, Russian television presenter, one of the first television presenters in the Soviet Union.
- Sir George Macfarlane, 91, British scientist and engineer.
- Tod H. Mikuriya, 73, American psychiatrist and medical marijuana advocate, cancer.
- Stanley Miller, 77, American chemist and biologist, known for the Miller–Urey experiment into the origins of life, heart failure.
- William Peters, 85, American journalist and documentarian of race issues, Alzheimer's disease.
- Guram Sharadze, 66, Georgian philologist and politician, shot.
- Norman Von Nida, 93, Australian golfer.
- Ben Weisman, 85, American musician and songwriter, wrote nearly 60 songs for singer Elvis Presley, stroke.

=== 21 ===
- Clark Adams, 37, American secular humanist leader and activist.
- Frank William Gay, 86, American businessman, senior corporate aide to Howard Hughes.
- Peter Hayes, 58, Australian lawyer.
- Bruno Mattei, 75, Italian film director.
- Kenneth Sokoloff, 54, American economist who examined factor endowment, liver cancer.
- Sakorn Yang-keawsot, 85, Thai puppeteer, lung illness.

=== 22 ===
- Fannie Lee Chaney, 84, American civil rights activist.
- Erik Gaardhøje, 68, Danish footballer and Olympian (1960).
- Frank E. Maestrone, 84, American diplomat, ambassador to Kuwait (1976–1979), infection.
- Jef Planckaert, 73, Belgian cyclist.
- Pemba Doma Sherpa, 36, Nepali mountaineer, two-time summiteer of Mt. Everest, fall from Lhotse.
- Art Stevens, 92, American animator, film director and screenwriter (The Fox and the Hound, The Rescuers, The Black Cauldron), heart attack.

=== 23 ===
- Clyde Robert Bulla, 93, American children's author.
- Leo Cortsen, 76, Danish Olympic wrestler (1952).
- Kurt Dvorak, 78, Austrian Olympic field hockey player (1952).
- Dick Humbert, 88, American gridiron football player (Philadelphia Eagles).
- Kei Kumai, 76, Japanese film director, brain hemorrhage.
- Tron Øgrim, 59, Norwegian author and politician.
- Åke Sundborg, 85, Swedish geographer and geomorphologist.

=== 24 ===
- André Brunaud, 92, French Olympic wrestler (1948, 1952).
- Buddy Childers, 81, American jazz trumpeter, cancer.
- Les Harmer, 86, New Zealand cricket umpire.
- Bill Johnston, 85, Australian cricketer, member of the 1948 Invincibles.
- Philip Mayer Kaiser, 93, American diplomat, ambassador to Senegal and Mauritania, Hungary, and Austria, pneumonia.
- Norm Maleng, 68, American prosecutor (King County, Washington), cardiac arrest.
- Christopher Newton, 37, American convicted murderer, execution by lethal injection.
- Minako Oba, 77, Japanese author.
- David Renton, Baron Renton, 98, British politician and aristocrat, oldest peer in the House of Lords.

=== 25 ===
- Arwon, 33, New Zealand-born racehorse, longest surviving Melbourne Cup winner, euthanasia.
- Laurie Bartram, 49, American actress (Friday the 13th) and ballet dancer, pancreatic cancer.
- Victor Firea, 84, Romanian Olympic middle-distance runner (1952).
- Vladimír Kučera, 64, Czech boxer and Olympian (1964, 1968).
- Charles Nelson Reilly, 76, American actor (How to Succeed in Business Without Really Trying, The Ghost & Mrs. Muir, All Dogs Go to Heaven), Tony winner (1962), complications from pneumonia.
- Kaspar Schiesser, 91, Swiss Olympic runner.
- Sun Yuanliang, 103, Chinese-born General with the Kuomintang, exiled in Taiwan.
- Bartholomew Ulufa'alu, 56, Solomon Islander politician, Prime Minister of the Solomon Islands (1997–2000), after long illness.

=== 26 ===
- Sir James Baird, 92, British army general.
- James Beck, 77, American art historian, founder of ArtWatch International.
- Jimmy Crawford, 62, American racing driver.
- Gene Gibson, 82, American basketball player and coach (Texas Tech University), complications from surgery.
- Marek Krejčí, 26, Slovak footballer, car accident.
- Tommie Laubscher, 43, South African rugby union player (Western Province, national team), hit by a car.
- Phyllis Sellick, 95, British pianist.
- Aubrey Singer, 80, British television executive, head of BBC Two (1974–1978).
- Moses Siregar, 96, Indonesian American Army Veteran, Maritime Chef (born 1912 or 1910 or 1914)
- Khalil al-Zahawi, 60–61, Iraqi calligrapher, shot.

=== 27 ===
- Ron Archer, 73, Australian Test cricketer, lung cancer.
- Nariman Ataev, 36, Uzbek boxer and Olympian (1996).
- Edward Behr, 81, British journalist and author.
- Gilbert Fillion, 66, Canadian politician, member of the House of Commons of Canada (1993-1997).
- Sam Garrison, 65, American lawyer, defended President Richard Nixon in impeachment hearings in 1974, leukemia.
- Marquise Hill, 24, American football player (New England Patriots), drowning.
- Jack Kerr, 96, New Zealand cricket player, chairman and president of New Zealand Cricket.
- Wiley Mayne, 90, American politician, U.S. Representative from Iowa (1966–1974), cardiopulmonary incident.
- Howard Porter, 58, American basketball player (Bulls, Knicks, Pistons), injuries sustained from beating.
- Izumi Sakai, 40, Japanese singer (Zard), cerebral contusion.
- Percy Sonn, 57, South African cricket player, President of the International Cricket Council, complications after surgery.
- Gretchen Wyler, 75, American actress (Private Benjamin, Dallas, The Devil's Brigade) and animal rights activist, complications from breast cancer.
- Ed Yost, 87, American inventor of the modern hot air balloon.

=== 28 ===
- Barbara Cox Anthony, 84, American heiress, after long illness.
- Tatyana Gonobobleva, 58, Soviet Russian volleyball player and Olympian (1972).
- Hal Helgeson, 75, American geochemist, lung cancer.
- Jörg Immendorff, 61, German painter, amyotrophic lateral sclerosis.
- Phyllis Koehn, 84, American baseball player (All-American Girls Professional Baseball League).
- David Lane, 68, American white supremacist leader and author.
- John Macquarrie, 87, British theologian, Lady Margaret Professor of Divinity at Oxford (1970–1986).
- Toshikatsu Matsuoka, 62, Japanese politician, Minister of Agriculture, suicide by hanging.
- Parren Mitchell, 85, American politician, U.S. Representative from Maryland (1971–1987), co-founder of Congressional Black Caucus, pneumonia.
- Ethel Mutharika, 63, Zimbabwe-born First Lady of Malawi, cancer.

=== 29 ===
- Dave Balon, 68, Canadian ice hockey player, multiple sclerosis.
- Tony Bastable, 62, British television presenter (Magpie), DJ and independent producer, pneumonia.
- Dame Lois Browne-Evans, 79, Bermudian politician.
- John Collins, 68, New Zealand rugby union player (Poverty Bay, national team).
- Donald Johanos, 79, American conductor.
- Norman Kaye, 80, Australian actor and musician, Alzheimer's disease.
- Posteal Laskey Jr., 69, American convicted murderer, commonly believed to be the serial killer called the "Cincinnati Strangler".
- Tahir Mirza, 70, Pakistani journalist and former editor of Dawn, lung cancer.
- Folole Muliaga, 44, Samoan–NZ teacher whose oxygen machine failed after power cut for unpaid account, heart and lung disease.
- Michael Seaton, 84, British astronomer and physicist.
- Wallace Seawell, 90, American photographer and filmmaker, age-related causes.
- John Stanning Jr, 87, English cricketer.

=== 30 ===
- Jean-Claude Brialy, 74, French actor and director, cancer.
- Kieran Carey, 74, Irish hurler.
- Birgit Dalland, 100, Norwegian politician.
- Mark Harris, 84, American author (Bang the Drum Slowly), Alzheimer's disease.
- Emmanuel Hostache, 31, French bobsledder and Olympian (1998, 2002).
- Preston Martin, 83, American banker, Deputy Chairman of the Federal Reserve Board (1982–1986), cancer.
- William Morris Meredith Jr., 88, American poet and Pulitzer Prize winner.
- Yevgeni Mishakov, 66, Russian ice hockey player.

=== 31 ===
- George Bragg, 81, American conductor and founder of the Texas Boys Choir.
- Norman Fletcher, 89, American architect.
- Clifford Scott Green, 84, American jurist, Federal Court judge.
- David J. Lawson, 77, American minister, bishop of the United Methodist Church, after long illness.
- Fathia Nkrumah, 75, Egyptian–born Ghanaian First Lady, after long illness.
- Charles Lee Remington, 85, American zoologist, known for studies of butterflies and moths.
- Alexander Tubelsky, 66, Russian academic, President of Association of Democratic Schools, stroke.
- Jim Williams, 92, American basketball coach (Colorado State University).
