= 1932 in the United Kingdom =

Events from the year 1932 in the United Kingdom.

== Incumbents ==
- Monarch – George V
- Prime Minister – Ramsay MacDonald (Coalition)

== Events ==
- 1 January
  - The English Folk Dance and Song Society holds its first festival under this name following merger of the Folk-Song Society and the English Folk Dance Society.
  - The King gives the title of Princess Royal to his only daughter, Princess Mary, Countess of Harewood, a year after the death of the previous holder.
- 8 January — the Archbishop of Canterbury forbids church remarriage of divorcees.
- 24 January — inmates at Dartmoor Prison mutiny.
- 26 January — British submarine HMS M2 sinks off the Dorset coast with all sixty hands.
- 1-29 February — with an average precipitation of 9.5 millimetres or 0.37 inches, this period constitutes the driest calendar month over the United Kingdom as a whole since records began in 1836.
- 4—15 February — Great Britain and Northern Ireland compete in the Winter Olympics at Lake Placid, New York, but do not win any medals.

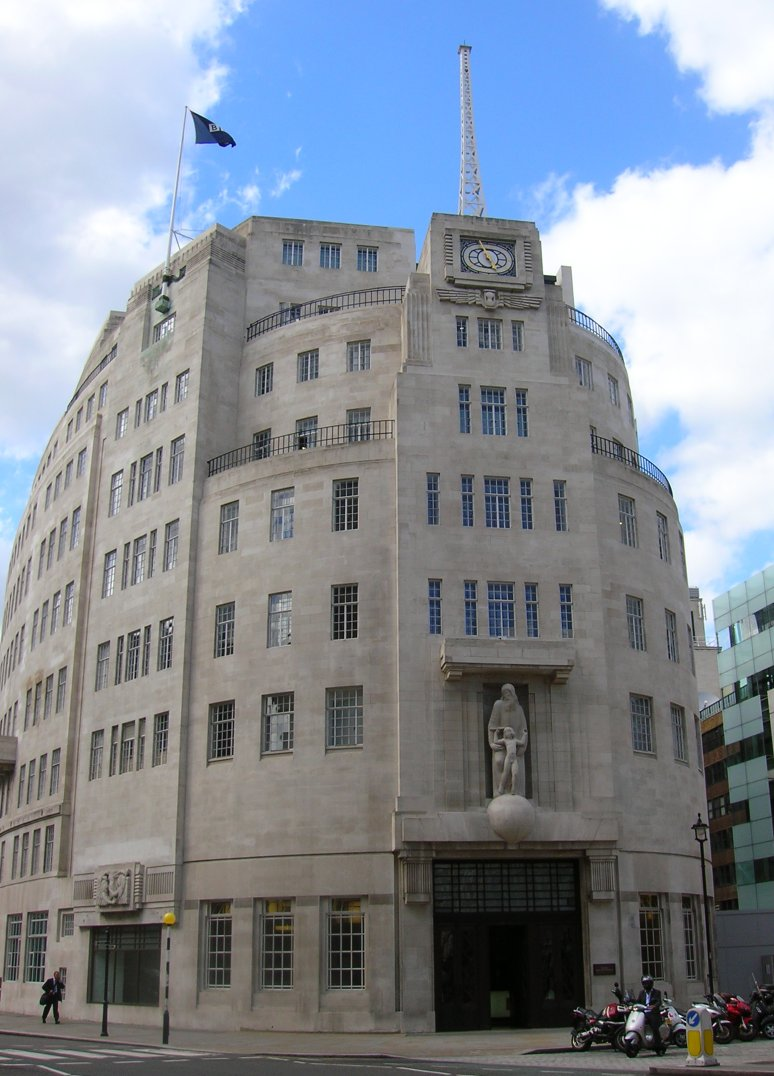
Broadcasting House

- 1 March — Import Duties Act re-establishes protective trade tariffs.
- 15 March — first BBC radio broadcast from the new Broadcasting House in London; all programmes transfer from 15 May.
- 6 April – Ministry of Health encourages local councils to engage in widespread slum clearance.
- 13 April — mass trespass of Kinder Scout, a wilful trespass by ramblers at Kinder Scout, in the Peak District of England, to protest against lack of free public access to open country.
- 14 April – John Cockcroft and Ernest Walton, at the Cavendish Laboratory in the University of Cambridge, focus a proton beam on lithium and split its nucleus ("splitting the atom").
- 23 April — new Shakespeare Memorial Theatre opens in Stratford-upon-Avon; designed by Elisabeth Scott, it is the country's first important work by a woman architect.
- 1 May — protestors clash with police in Hyde Park, London, during a May day protest against Japan's attitude towards China when they try to march on the Japanese Embassy.
- 10 May — James Chadwick, working at the Cavendish Laboratory in the University of Cambridge, reports the existence of the neutron.
- 26 May — the Scots law case of Donoghue v Stevenson is decided in the House of Lords, establishing the modern concept of a duty of care in cases of negligence.
- 25 June – India plays its first Test cricket match with England at Lord's.
- 2 July — the exiled former king of Portugal, Manuel II, dies at Fulwell in Middlesex; his body is later returned to Portugal for burial.
- 4 July — George Carwardine patents the Anglepoise lamp.
- 12 July — Hedley Verity of Yorkshire establishes a new first-class cricket record by taking all ten wickets for only ten runs against Nottinghamshire on a pitch affected by a storm.
- 19 July — King George V opens the replacement Lambeth Bridge across the Thames in London.
- 30 July—14 August — Great Britain and Northern Ireland compete at the Olympics in Los Angeles, California and win 4 gold, 7 silver and 5 bronze.
- 1 August — Forrest Mars produces the first Mars bar in his Slough factory.
- 22 August — first experimental television broadcast by the BBC.
- 20 September — Methodist Union: the Methodist Church is formed in Britain by merger of the Wesleyan Methodist Church, the Primitive Methodists and the United Methodist Church.
- 26 September — first contingent of the National Hunger March leaves Glasgow.
- October
  - Oswald Mosley founds the British Union of Fascists.
  - Anglo-Irish Trade War begins.
- 3 October — The Times newspaper first appears set in the Times New Roman typeface devised by Stanley Morison.
- 7 October — Thomas Beecham establishes the London Philharmonic Orchestra.
- 10 October — a mine cage accident at Bickershaw Colliery in the Lancashire Coalfield drowns 19.
- 13 October — Britain grants independence to the kingdom of Iraq, ending the British mandate there in exchange for a restrictive long-term military alliance.
- 25 October – George Lansbury becomes the leader of the opposition Labour Party.
- 27 October — arrival of the Hunger March in London leads to several violent clashes with police.
- 14 November — book tokens go on sale in the UK.
- 30 November — the BBC begins a series of radio broadcasts to mark the 75th birthday of Sir Edward Elgar.
- 2 December — English cricket team in Australia in 1932–33: opening of the “bodyline” series.
- 5 December — the comic strip character Jane first appears in the Daily Mirror.
- 10 December
  - John Galsworthy wins the Nobel Prize in Literature "for his distinguished art of narration which takes its highest form in The Forsyte Saga".
  - Charles Scott Sherrington and Edgar Adrian, 1st Baron Adrian, win the Nobel Prize in Physiology or Medicine "for their discoveries regarding the functions of neurons".
- 19 December — the BBC Empire Service, later known as the BBC World Service, begins broadcasting using a shortwave radio facility at its Daventry transmitting station.
- 25 December — King George V delivers the first Royal Christmas Message on the BBC Empire Service from Sandringham House; the text has been written by Rudyard Kipling.

=== Undated ===
- Opening of the Hoover Building on the Western Avenue in Perivale, Middlesex, a noted example of Art Deco architecture, designed by Wallis, Gilbert and Partners for The Hoover Company.
- Production of Fordson tractors in the U.K. begins at Dagenham in Essex.
- Production of Weetabix breakfast cereal in the U.K. begins at Burton Latimer in Northamptonshire.

== Publications ==
- Agatha Christie's Hercule Poirot novel Peril at End House.
- Lewis Grassic Gibbon's novel Sunset Song, first in A Scots Quair trilogy.
- Stella Gibbons' parodic novel Cold Comfort Farm.
- J. B. S. Haldane's study The Causes of Evolution, unifying Mendelian genetics and evolutionary science.
- Aldous Huxley's dystopian novel Brave New World.
- Captain W. E. Johns' first Biggles aviation stories, collected as The Camels are Coming.
- F. R. Leavis' study New Bearings in English Poetry.
- Q. D. Leavis' study Fiction and the Reading Public.
- John Cowper Powys' Wessex novel A Glastonbury Romance.
- Dorothy L. Sayers' Lord Peter Wimsey novel Have His Carcase.
- Evelyn Waugh's satirical novel Black Mischief.
- First issue of the journal of literary criticism Scrutiny: a quarterly review edited by F. R. Leavis (published in May).
- First issue of the magazine Woman's Own.

== Births ==
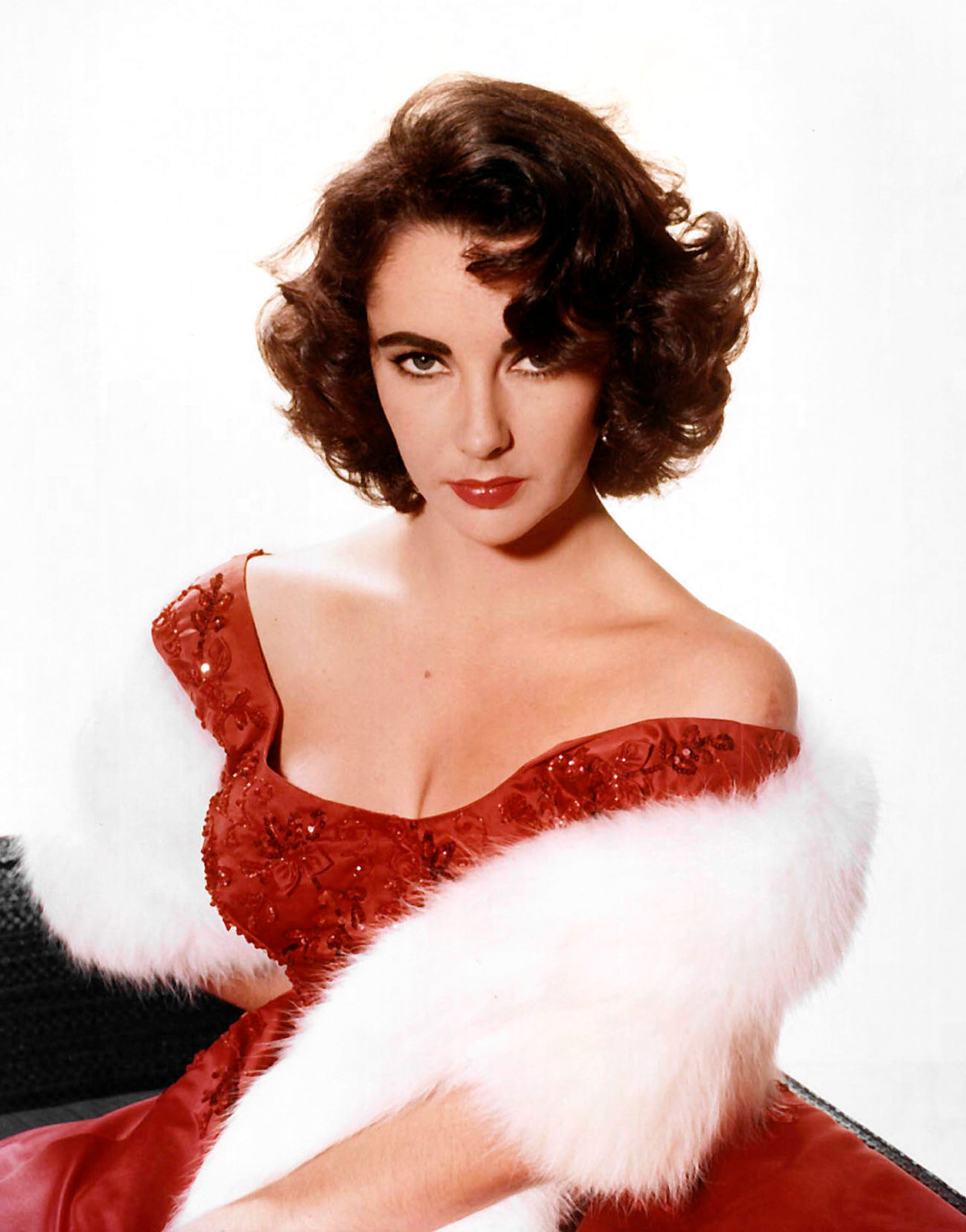
Elizabeth Taylor

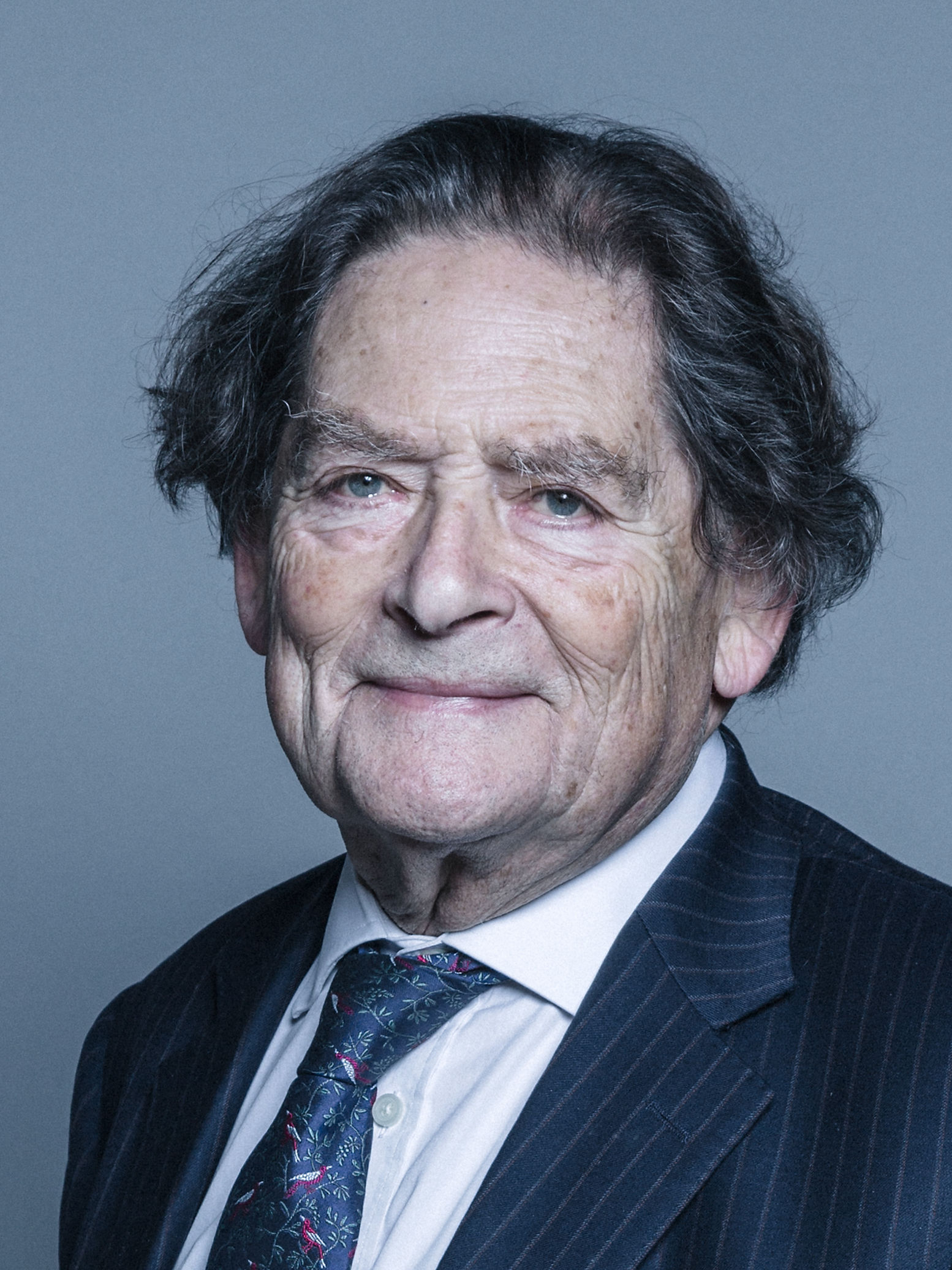
Nigel Lawson

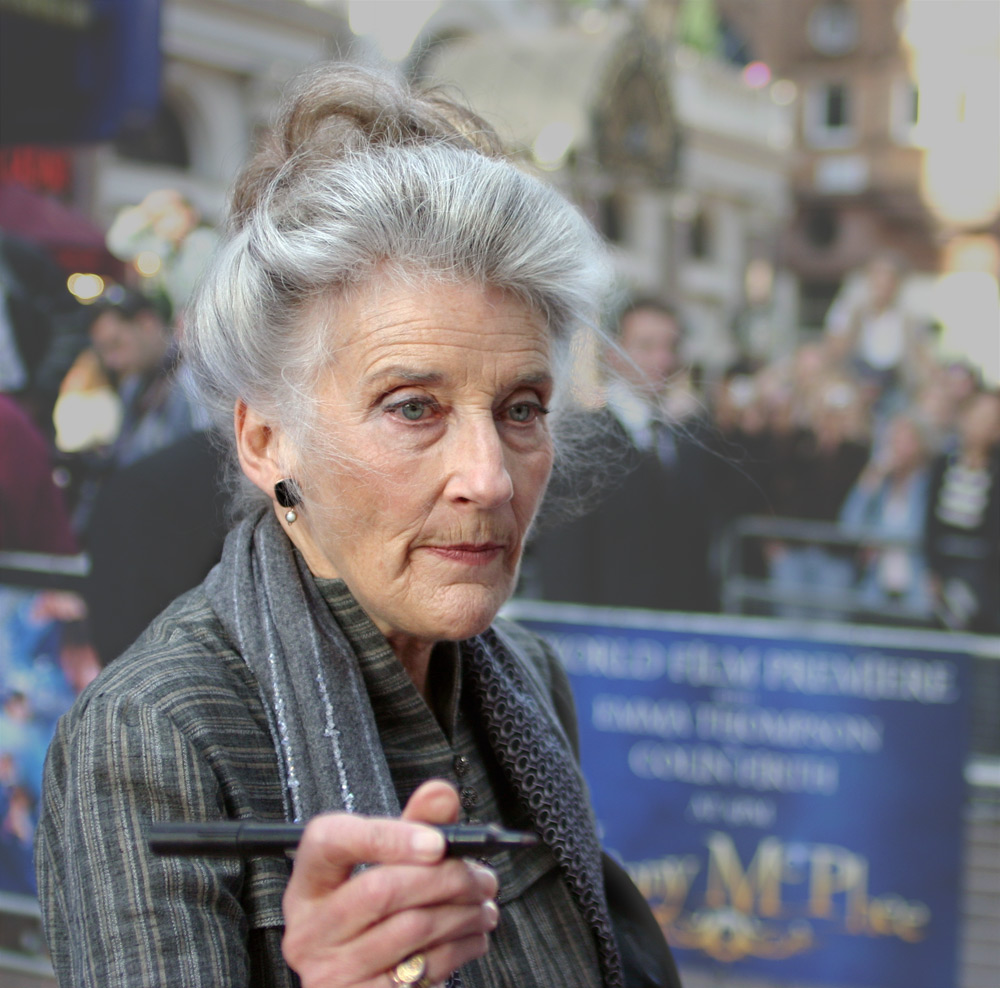
Phyllida Law

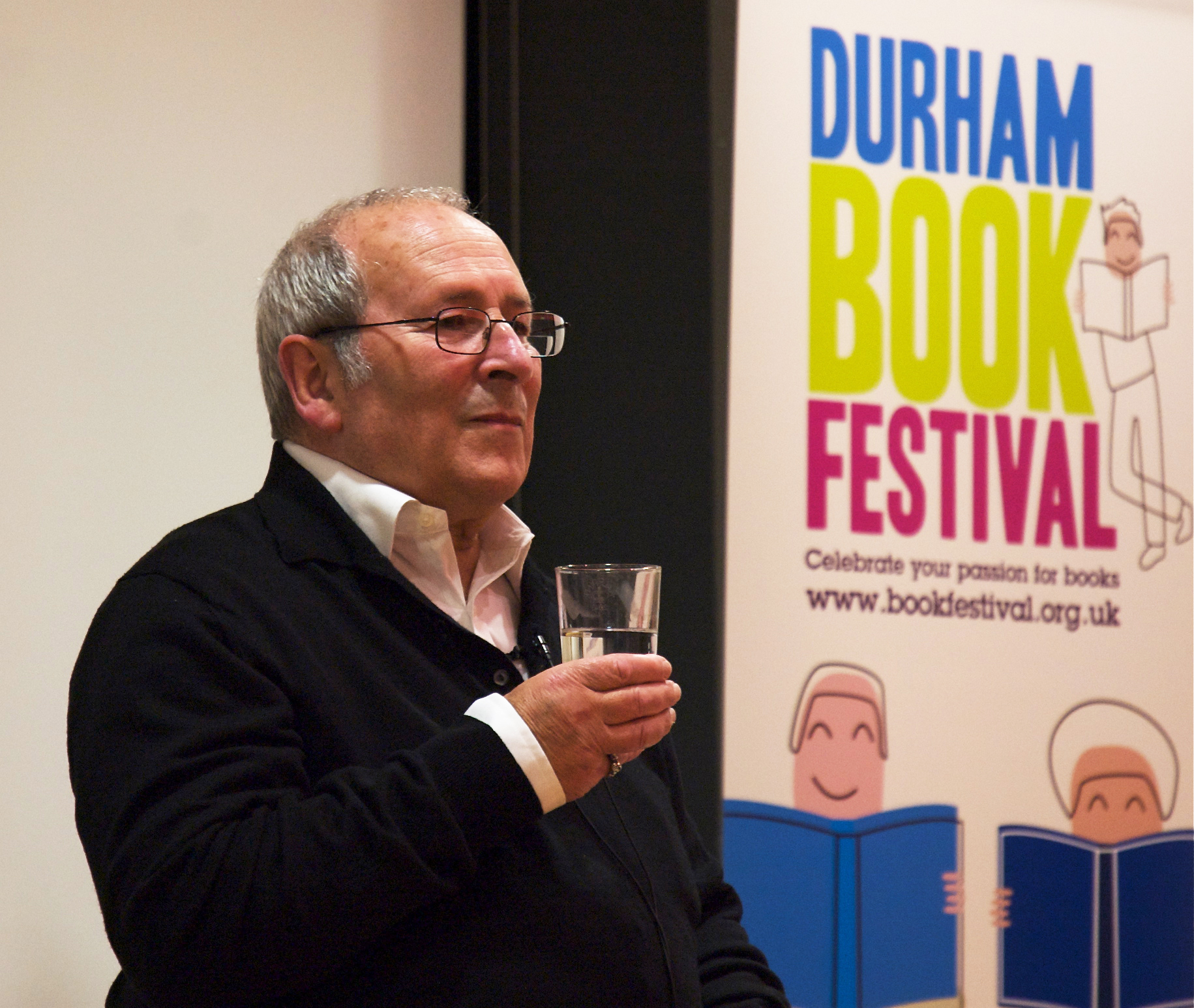
Arnold Wesker

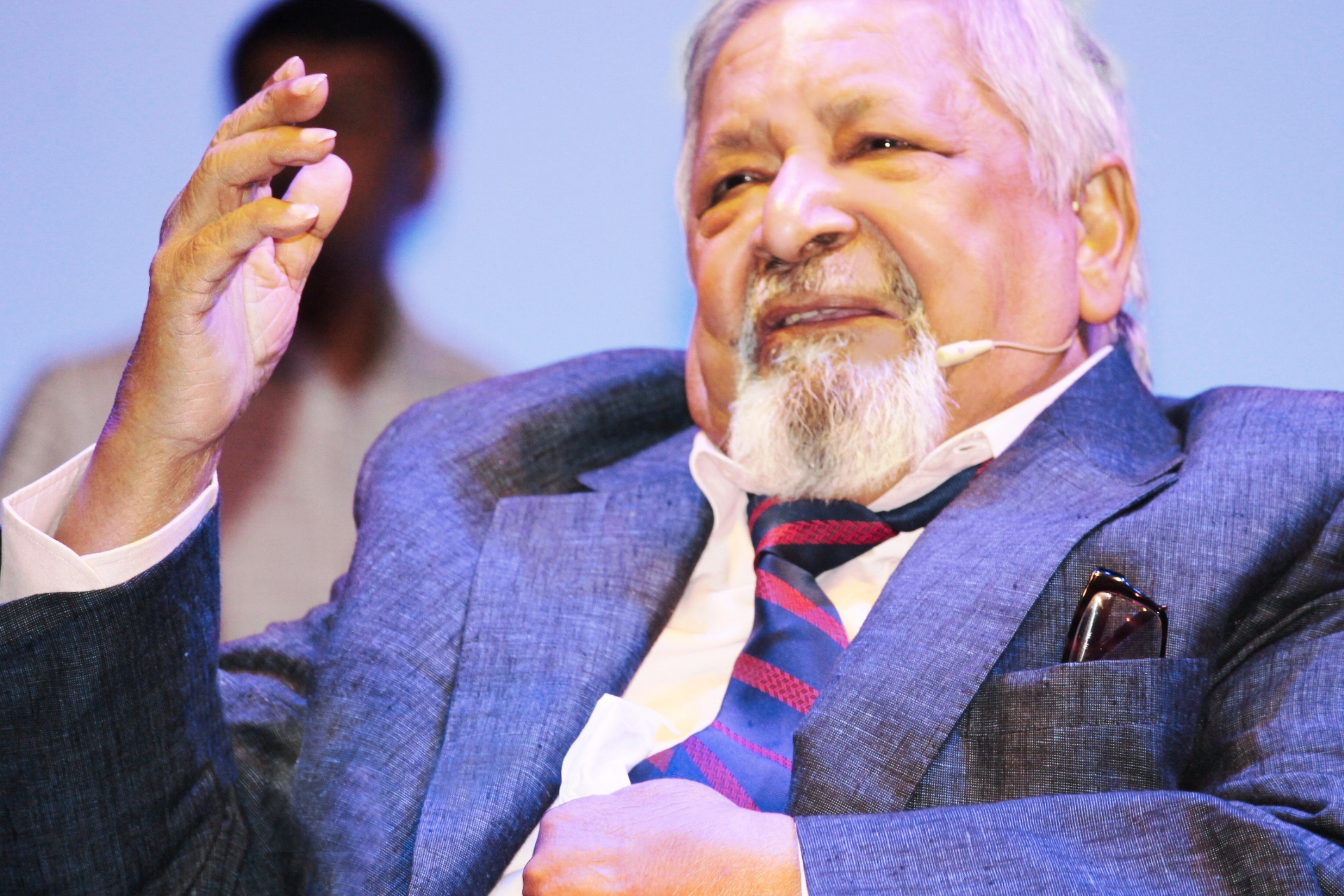
V. S. Naipaul

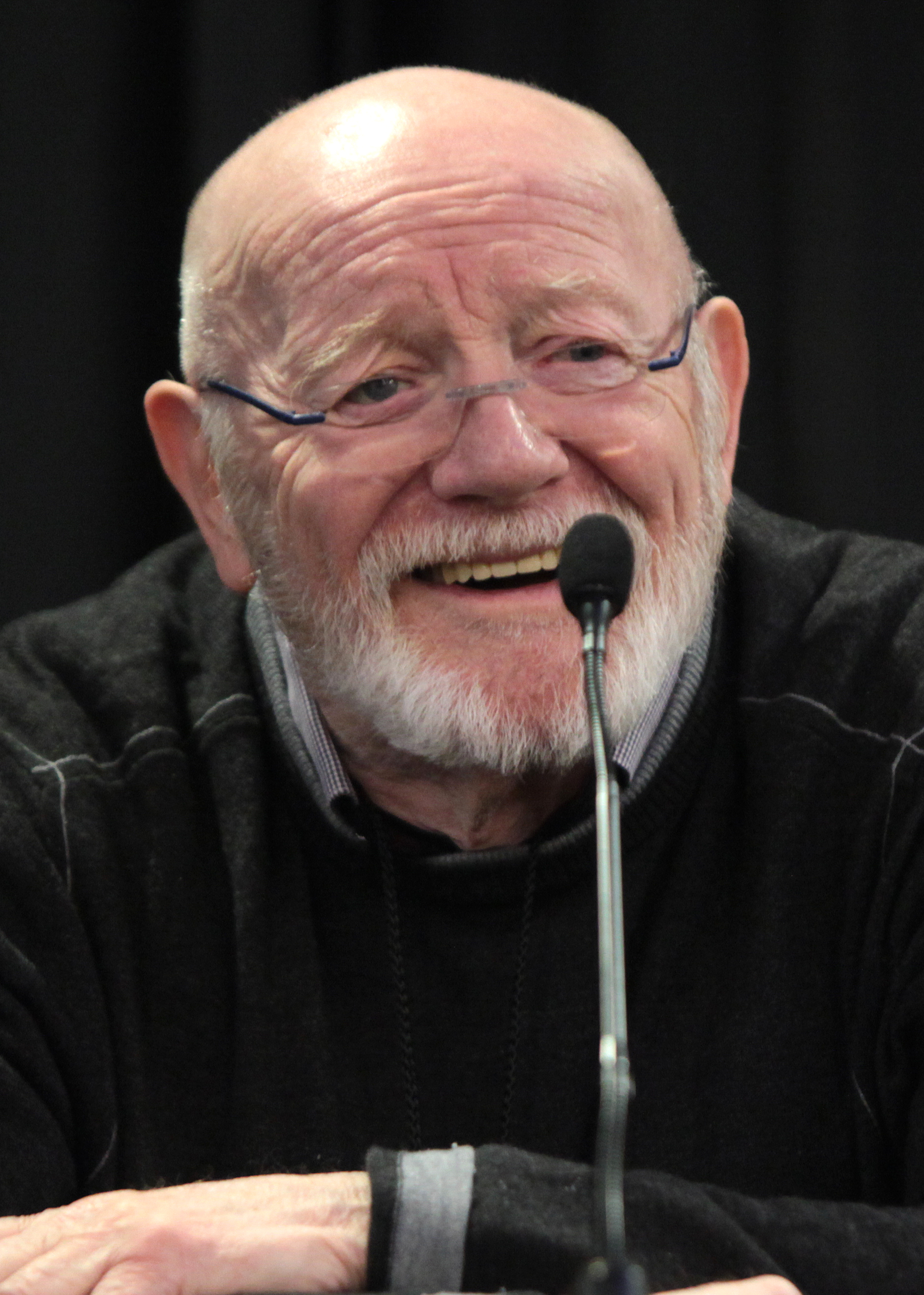
W. Morgan Sheppard

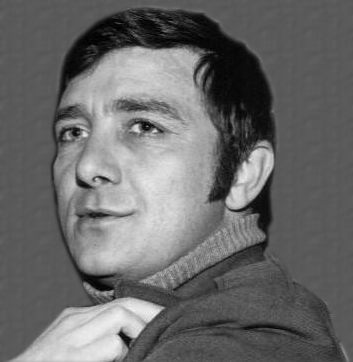
Richard Dawson

- 2 January – Peter Redgrove, poet (died 2003)
- 4 January – Thelma Holt, actress and producer
- 12 January – Des O'Connor, comedian, singer and television presenter (died 2020)
- 14 January – Timothy Sprigge, philosopher (died 2007)
- 15 January – Louis George Alexander, teacher and author (died 2002)
- 19 January – Russ Hamilton, singer (died 2008)
- 23 January – George Allen, footballer (died 2016)
- 29 January – Tommy Taylor, footballer (died 1958)
- 30 January – Lady Mary Colman, socialite and philanthropist (died 2021)
- 1 February – John Nott, Conservative politician (died 2024)
- 3 February – Molly Parkin, journalist, novelist and painter (died 2026)
- 8 February
  - Cliff Allison, racing driver (died 2005)
  - Elspeth Howe, public servant (died 2022)
  - Jean Saunders, romantic novelist (died 2011)
- 11 February – Dennis Skinner, politician
- 12 February – Richard Rougier, judge (died 2007)
- 13 February
  - David Neal, actor (died 2000)
  - Barbara Shelley, actress (died 2021)
- 14 February
  - Peter Ball, bishop and sex offender (died 2019)
  - Jocelyn Stevens, publisher, journalist and charity executive (died 2014)
- 15 February – Adrian Swire, English businessman (died 2018)
- 22 February – Roger Squires, crossword compiler (died 2023)
- 25 February – Tony Brooks, racing driver (died 2022)
- 27 February – Elizabeth Taylor, film actress (died 2011 in the United States)
- 28 February – Brian Moore, football commentator (died 2001)
- 11 March – Nigel Lawson, Chancellor of the Exchequer (died 2023)
- 21 March – Tom Watson, actor (died 2001)
- 25 March – Martin Brandon-Bravo, politician (died 2018)
- 27 March – Patrick Newell, actor (died 1988)
- 1 April – Avril Elgar, actress (died 2021)
- 9 April – Jack Smethurst, actor (died 2022)
- 10 April – Adrian Henri, Liverpool poet (died 2000)
- 14 April – Bob Grant, actor, comedian and writer (died 2003)
- 15 April – John T. Lewis, Welsh physicist (died 2004)
- 21 April – Angela Mortimer, tennis player (died 2025)
- 25 April
  - David Frederick Case, audiobook narrator (died 2005)
  - William Roache, actor (Coronation Street)
- 26 April – Michael Smith, chemist, Nobel Prize laureate (died 2000 in Canada)
- 4 May – Ivor Wood, television animator (died 2004)
- 6 May – Alexander Thynn, 7th Marquess of Bath, peer and landowner (died 2020)
- 7 May – Jenny Joseph, poet (died 2018)
- 9 May
  - Gavin Lyall, novelist (died 2003)
  - Geraldine McEwan, actress (died 2015)
- 12 May – Derek Malcolm, historian and film critic (died 2023)
- 19 May – Alma Cogan, singer (died 1966)
- 20 May – Kevin Ruane, journalist (died 2018)
- 24 May – Arnold Wesker, dramatist (died 2016)
- 25 May – Norman Drew, Northern Irish golfer (died 2023)
- 27 May – Jeffrey Bernard, journalist (died 1997)
- 29 May – Walker H. Land, academic bioengineering researcher
- 30 May
  - Ray Cooney, farceur
  - Ivor Richard, Welsh Labour politician (died 2018)
- 8 June – Ray Illingworth, cricketer (died 2021)
- 9 June – Denise Robertson, broadcaster and writer (died 2016)
- 18 June – Geoffrey Hill, poet (died 2016)
- 21 June – Bernard Ingham, journalist and government press secretary (died 2023)
- 22 June
  - Prunella Scales, actress (died 2025)
  - John Wakeham, businessman and Conservative Party politician
- 25 June
  - Peter Blake, pop artist
  - Charles Morrison, politician (died 2005)
  - Tim Parnell, racing driver (died 2017)
- 26 June – John Wall, inventor (died 2018)
- 27 June
  - Alan Warren, Anglican priest and author (died 2020)
  - Hugh Wood, composer (died 2021)
- 30 June – Ingrid Allen, neuroscientist (died 2020)
- 4 July – Matt Crowe, Scottish football (soccer) player (died 2017)
- 6 July – Phyllida Law, actress
- 8 July
  - Roy Proverbs, football (soccer) player (died 2017)
  - Brian Walden, politician and political interviewer (died 2019)
- 10 July – George Black, Royal Air Force officer
- 16 July – John Chilton, jazz trumpeter (died 2016)
- 17 July – Colin Webster, Welsh footballer (died 2001)
- 21 July – Vilma Hollingbery, actress (died 2021)
- 23 July
  - Hugh Davies, Welsh cricketer (died 2017)
  - Tony Dean, racing driver (died 2008)
- 26 July – Neil McCarthy, actor (died 1985)
- 28 July – Russell Johnston, politician (died 2008)
- 6 August
  - Michael Deeley, film producer
  - Howard Hodgkin, painter and print-maker (died 2017)
- 9 August – Reginald Bosanquet, television news presenter (died 1984)
- 11 August – Eric Varley, politician (died 2008)
- 17 August – V. S. Naipaul, Trinidadian-born writer (died 2018)
- 20 August – Anthony Ainley, actor (died 2004)
- 23 August – Christopher Parsons, film-maker (died 2002)
- 24 August
  - Cormac Murphy-O'Connor, cardinal and Archbishop of Westminster (died 2017)
  - W. Morgan Sheppard, actor (died 2019)
- 27 August – Lady Antonia Fraser, writer
- 31 August – Roy Castle, entertainer (died 1994)
- 1 September – Raymond Durgnat, film critic (died 2002)
- 4 September
  - Edward de Souza, actor
  - Dinsdale Landen, actor (died 2003)
- 7 September – Malcolm Bradbury, author and academic (died 2000)
- 9 September – Alice Thomas Ellis, writer (died 2005)
- 11 September
  - Peter Anderson, footballer (died 2009)
  - Ian Hamer, jazz trumpeter (died 2006)
- 16 September – Micky Stewart, cricketer
- 21 September – Shirley Conran, author and journalist (died 2024)
- 22 September
  - Michael Barnes, politician (died 2018)
  - Ian Kennedy, comics artist (died 2022)
- 25 September
  - Terry Medwin, footballer (died 2024)
  - Brian Murphy, comedy actor (died 2025)
- 27 September – Michael Colvin, Conservative politician (died 2000)
- 28 September – Jeremy Isaacs, television executive and opera manager
- 4 October – Edward Judd, actor (died 2009)
- 5 October – Michael John Rogers, ornithologist (died 2006)
- 8 October – Ray Reardon, Welsh snooker player (died 2024)
- 9 October – Colin Clark, film-maker (died 2002)
- 10 October – Harry Smith, footballer (died 2016)
- 15 October – Vince Karalius, English rugby league footballer and coach (died 2008)
- 17 October – David Willey, journalist (died 2026)
- 24 October – Adrian Mitchell, poet and novelist (died 2008)
- 6 November – Ron Saunders, footballer and manager (died 2019)
- 4 November – Joyce Blair, actress (died 2006)
- 11 November – John Zamet, periodontist (died 2007)
- 15 November – Petula Clark, singer, actress and songwriter
- 18 November – Trevor Baxter, actor and playwright (died 2017)
- 20 November – Richard Dawson, comedian and game show host (died 2012)
- 21 November – Beryl Bainbridge, novelist (died 2010)
- 30 November – Arthur Hopcraft, scriptwriter (died 2004)
- 5 December – Alf Dubs, Baron Dubs, politician
- 15 December – John Meurig Thomas, scientist (died 2020)
- 16 December – Quentin Blake, cartoonist and illustrator
- 18 December – Marian Wenzel, art historian (died 2002)
- 19 December
  - Angela Flowers, gallerist (died 2023)
  - Crispin Nash-Williams, mathematician (died 2001)
- 24 December – Colin Cowdrey, cricketer (died 2000)
- 26 December – Ken Howard, painter (died 2022)
- 28 December – Roy Hattersley, Labour politician (died 2026)

== Deaths ==
- 8 January – William Graham, Scottish politician (born 1887)
- 13 January – Ernest Mangnall, football manager (born 1866)
- 21 January – Lytton Strachey, writer and biographer (born 1880)
- 24 January – Sir Alfred Yarrow, shipbuilder and philanthropist (born 1842)
- 10 February – Edgar Wallace, novelist and screenwriter (born 1875)
- 4 March – Fawcet Wray, admiral (born 1873)
- 11 March – Dora Carrington, painter (born 1893)
- 16 March – Harold Monro, poet and bookshop proprietor (born 1879)
- 22 April – Edward Taylor Scott, newspaper editor/proprietor (drowned in yachting accident) (born 1883)
- 26 April – William Lockwood, cricketer (born 1868)
- 13 June – Alexander Bethell, admiral (born 1855)
- 2 July – Manuel II of Portugal, exiled monarch (born 1889)
- 6 July – Kenneth Grahame, author (born 1859)
- 16 July – Herbert Plumer, 1st Viscount Plumer, general (born 1857)
- 22 July – J. Meade Falkner, novelist and poet (born 1858)
- 23 July – Tenby Davies, Welsh sprinter (born 1884)
- 19 August – E. S. Prior, Arts and Crafts architect and theorist (born 1852)
- 16 September – Ronald Ross, physician, recipient of the Nobel Prize in Physiology or Medicine (born 1857)
- 1 October – W. G. Collingwood, painter and author (born 1854)
- 30 October – Paul Methuen, 3rd Baron Methuen, field marshal (born 1845)
- 12 November – Sir Dugald Clerk, mechanical engineer (born 1854)
- 13 November – Catherine Isabella Dodd, education writer and novelist (born 1860)
- 8 December – Gertrude Jekyll, garden designer, writer and artist (born 1843)

== See also ==
- List of British films of 1932
