= Ronald Stanley Leonard =

Canadian entertainer (1923–1998)

Ronald Stanley Leonard (August 23, 1923 – October 5, 1998) was a Canadian entertainer, artist, and entrepreneur. Best known as a talented magician and illusionist, he was also an accomplished painter. He used oils and watercolours to paint landscapes. His brother was the ventriloquist Cy Leonard.

He was a trained MC, a singer, and an actor who appeared on the same bill as Robert Goulet, Cab Calloway, Rich Little, and Jane Morgan. For 16 years, he was the featured magician known as Mr. Magic on Uncle Bobby, a children’s show on CFTO that ran in the 1960s and 1970s. He was given life membership to the Society of Canadian Magicians and the Toronto Hat and Rabbit Club, Ring 17. He toured a comedic illusionist act called “Funzafizzen Magic a Go-Go” in Toronto, Niagara Falls, and internationally. He called himself a comedian who happened to use magic as his vehicle.
