= Eurocopter AS355 Écureuil 2 =

Utility helicopter in France

AS355 Écureuil 2/Twin Squirrel/TwinStar
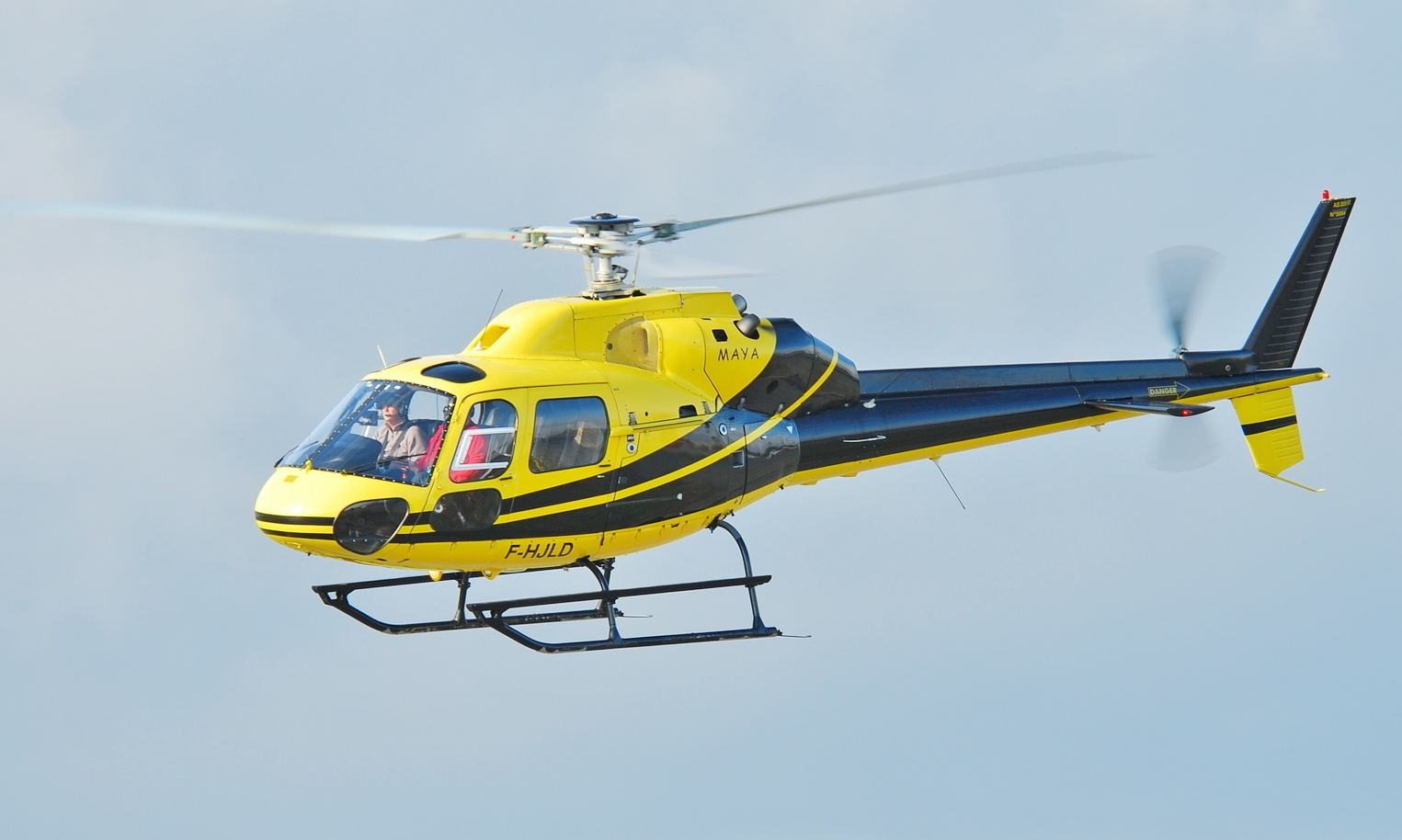
- A AS355 departs Toulouse–Blagnac Airport.

General information
- Type: Light utility helicopter
- National origin: France
- Manufacturer: Aérospatiale; Eurocopter; Airbus Helicopters; DaimlerChrysler Aerospace
- Status: In service

History
- Manufactured: 1975–2016
- First flight: 28 September 1979
- Developed from: Eurocopter AS350 Écureuil
- Developed into: Eurocopter AS555 Fennec 2

The Eurocopter, later Airbus Helicopters, AS355 Écureuil 2, or Twin Squirrel, is a twin-engine light utility helicopter developed and originally manufactured by Aérospatiale in France.

The Écureuil 2 was directly derived from the single-engined AS350 Écureuil, performing its maiden flight on 28 September 1979 and introduced to service shortly thereafter. The type was marketed in North America as the TwinStar. During the 1990s, Aérospatiale merged its helicopter interests into the multinational Eurocopter consortium; under this new entity, the Écureuil 2 continued to be manufactured. In 2016, shortly after Eurocopter's rebranding as Airbus Helicopters, the group ended production of the Écureuil 2.

== Design and development ==
During the early 1970s, Aérospatiale initiated a development programme to produce a replacement for the aging Aérospatiale Alouette II. While the Aérospatiale Gazelle, which had been developed in the 1960s and 1970s, had been met with numerous orders by military customers, commercial sales of the type had been less than anticipated, thus the need for a civil-oriented development was identified.

The development of the new rotorcraft, which was headed by Chief Engineer René Mouille, was focused on the production of an economic and cost-effective aerial vehicle. Both Aérospatiale's Production and Procurement departments were heavily involved in the design process. One such measure was the use of a rolled sheet structure, a manufacturing technique adapted from the automotive industry; another innovation was the newly developed Starflex main rotor. It was also decided that both civil and military variants of the emergent helicopter would be developed to conform with established military requirements.

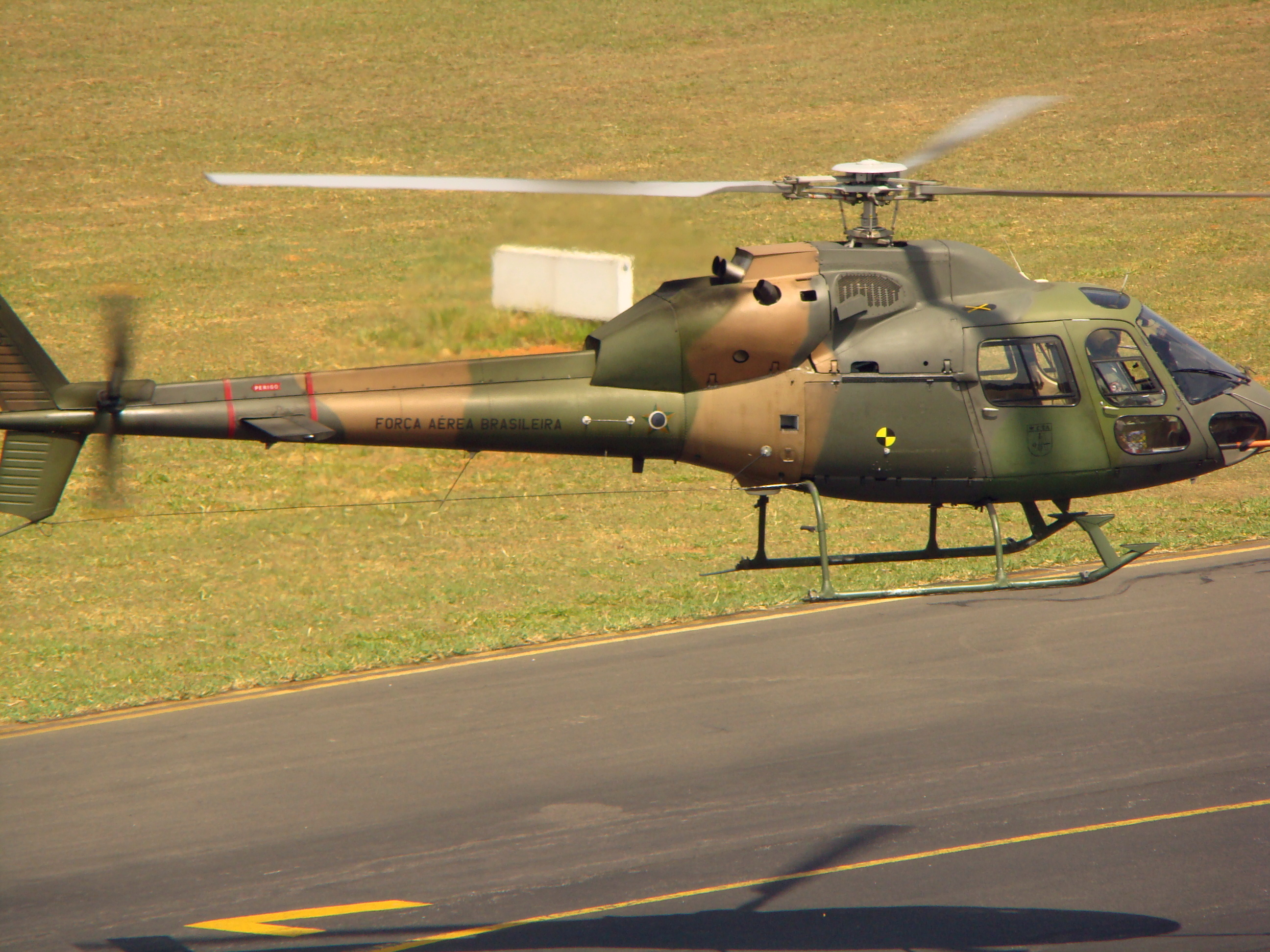
Helibras-built AS355 Écureuil 2

On 27 June 1974, the first prototype, an AS350C powered by a Lycoming LTS101 turboshaft engine, conducted its maiden flight at Marignane, France; the second prototype, powered by a Turbomeca Arriel 1A, following on 14 February 1975. On 28 September 1979, a twin-engined version of the rotorcraft made its first flight; it was subsequently released and marketed under the names Écureuil 2, Twin Squirrel and in North America, TwinStar.

It was not long before overseas production of the type commenced. The Brazilian helicopter manufacturer Helibras' most numerous product in its lineup has been the Eurocopter AS350 Écureuil. The company had licence-assembled both the AS350 and AS355 from kits shipped from Eurocopter main production line for the family in Marignane, France; Brazilian AS355s contain a level of indigenously developed content as well. During the 2000s, Eurocopter was reportedly in talks to open up an additional AS355 production line in China.

Despite the introduction of the Eurocopter EC130 in 2001, production of both the AS350 and AS355, and of their AS550 and AS555 Fennec militarized counterparts, was continued for some time. During 2007, the more capable AS355 NP variant, was introduced to service. According to aerospace periodical Flight International, the decision to develop the AS355 NP, which Eurocopter stated was aimed at the corporate transport and utility operators, had been the firm's response to American competitor Bell Helicopter's launch of the Bell 417.

In addition to Eurocopter's internal efforts to enhance the Écureuil 2, third parties developed their own modifications and upgrades specifically for the type. Conversion programs and addons for the AS350 family have been produced and are offered by numerous 'aftermarket' specialists; many upgrade and refit programmes have involved the increasing use of digital systems, such as the Garmin-built G500H avionics suite.

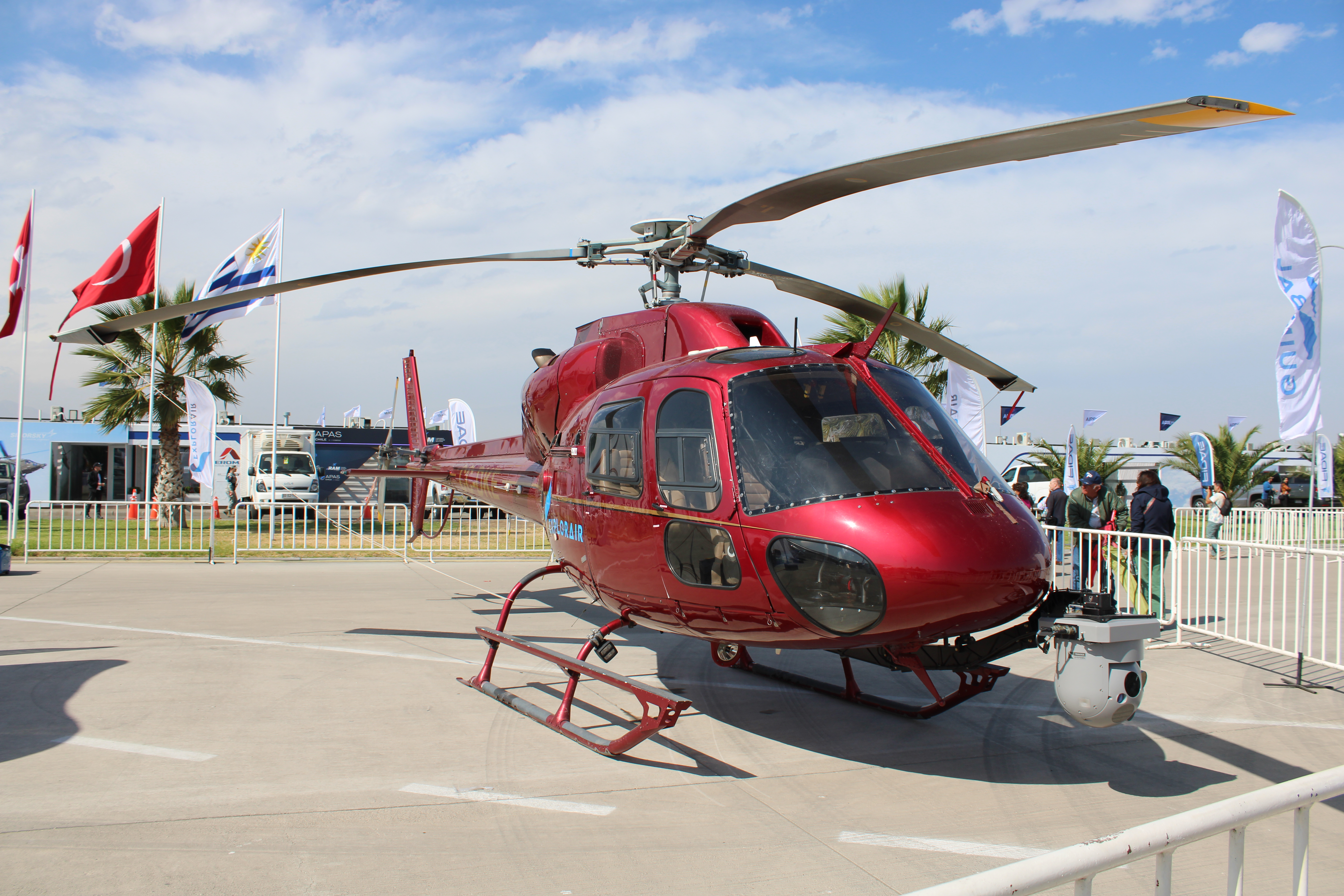
A parked Ecureuil 2.

During September 2015, Airbus Helicopters announced that the company had decided to terminate the manufacture of the AS355 as part of an effort to focus on stronger-selling rotorcraft. Production of the AS355 continued through 2016 until the existing order backlog had been fulfilled. Despite the termination of the AS355 programme, production of its AS350 siblings has continued and even been expanded around the same timeframe.

== Variants ==
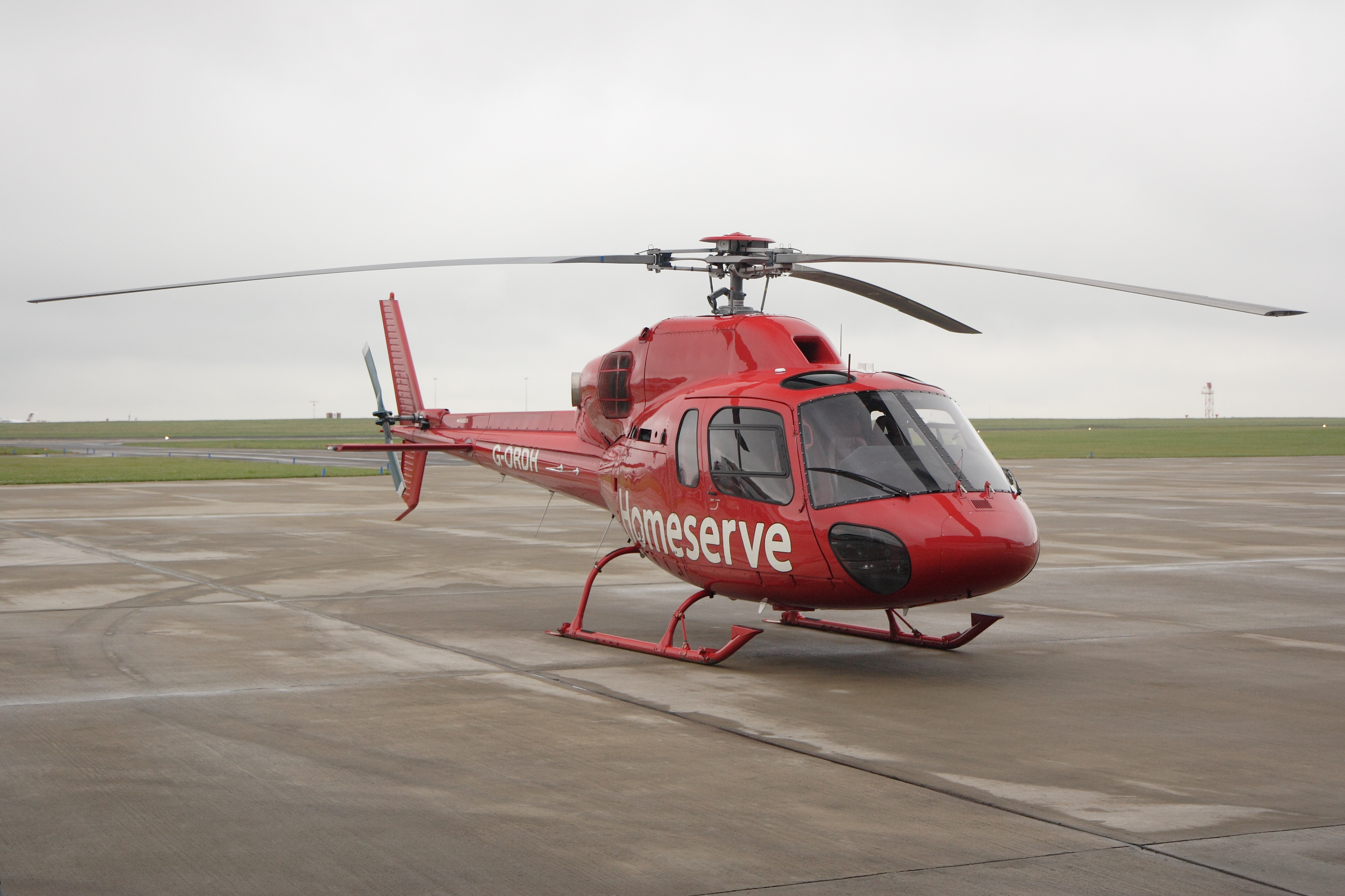
AS355N Twin Squirrel

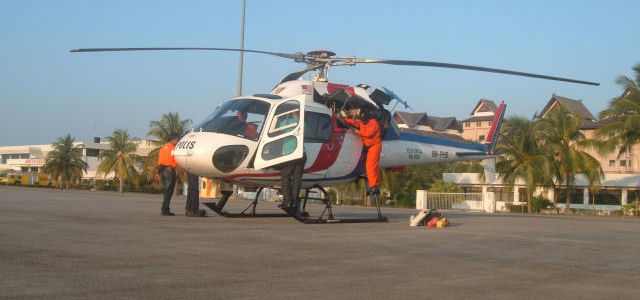
Royal Malaysian Police Air Wing's Twin Squirrel

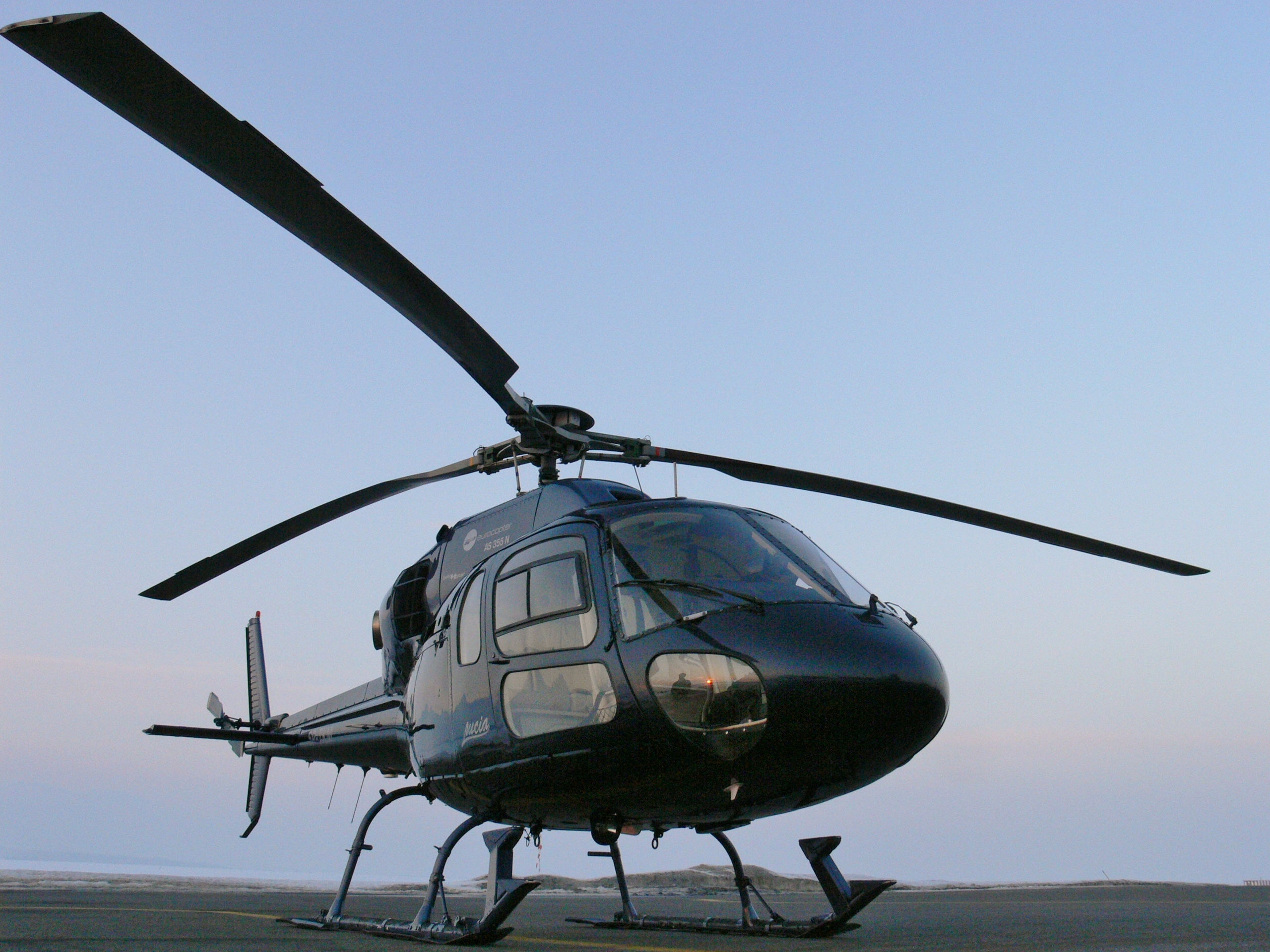
AS355 Ecureuil 2

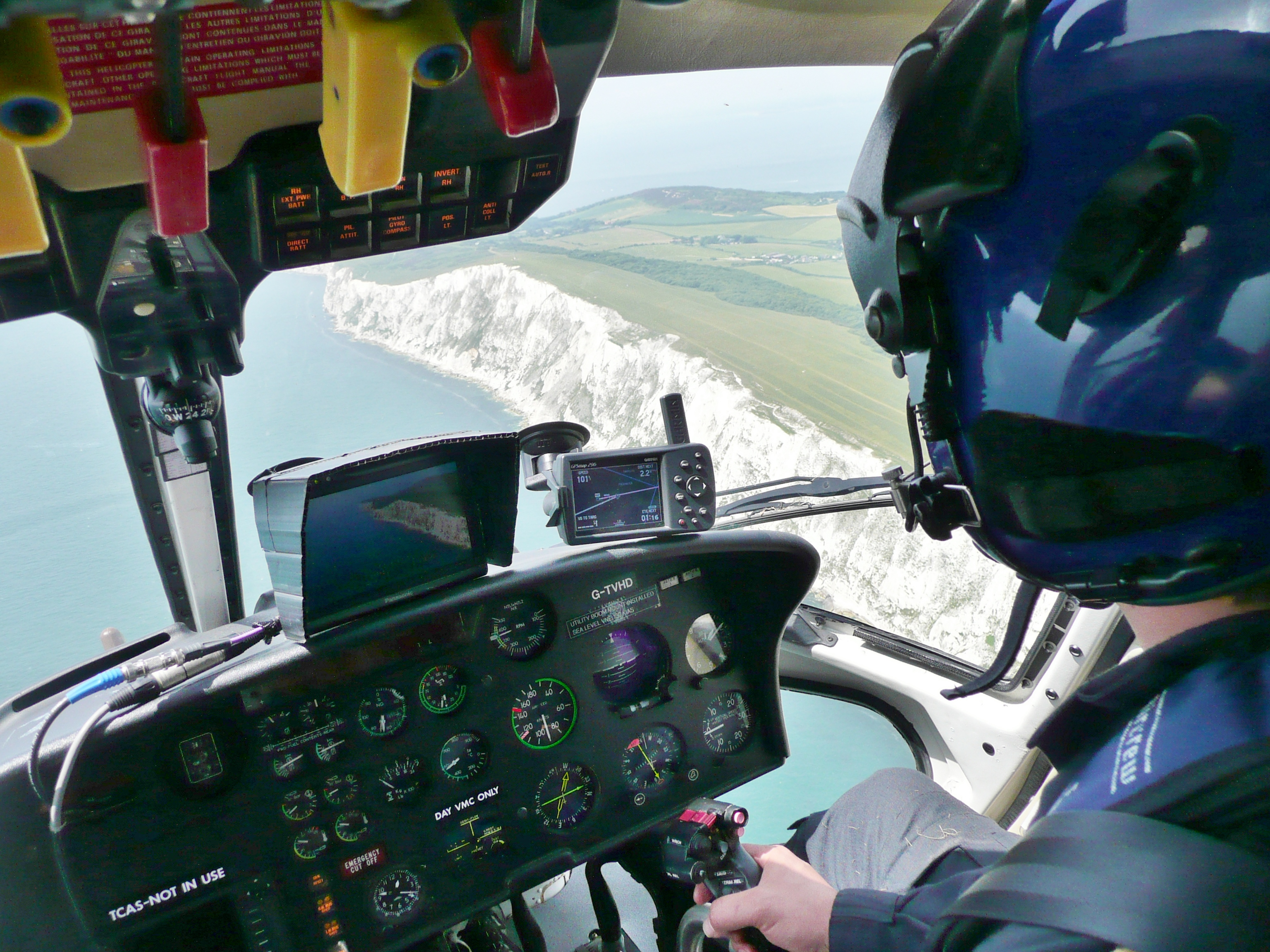
BBC News AS355 G-TVHD

AS355
Prototype of the twin-engined Écureuil 2 or Twin Squirrel
AS355 E
Initial production version, with single hydraulics, powered by two Allison 250-C20F turboshaft engines
AS355 F
Improved version, with dual hydraulics and increased maximum weight of 2,300 kg (5,070 lb)
AS355 F1
Powered by two Allison 250-C20F engines; 2,400 kg (5,291 lb) maximum weight
AS355 F2
Powered by two Allison 250-C20F engines; 2,540 kg (5,600 lb) maximum weight and a yaw compensation system
AS355 M
Initial armed version of AS355 F1
AS355 M2
Armed version of AS355 F2. Superseded by AS555 Fennec
AS355 N Ecureuil 2
Version fitted with two Turbomeca Arrius 1A engines and a Full Authority Digital Engine Control (FADEC) system for better M.T.O.W (2,600 kg or 5,732 lb) and better single engine performance, tail rotor strake added along starboard side of tail boom for better yaw authority
AS355 NP Ecureuil 2
Introduced in 2007, this version is fitted with two Turbomeca Arrius 1A1 turboshaft engines and a new AS350 B3-based main gearbox, increasing maximum take-off weight to 2,800 kg (6,173 lb).
HB.355F Esquilo Bi
Assembled in Brazil by Helibras (part of Eurocopter). Designated UH-13 by the Brazilian Navy. Cargo and VIP transport variants are respectively designated CH-55 and VH-55 by the Brazilian Air Force.
HB.355N Esquilo Bi
Assembled in Brazil by Helibras

=== Aftermarket conversions ===
Heli-Lynx 355FX1
Powered by the Allison C20F engine. FAA, TC, and EASA approved
Heli-Lynx 355FX2
Powered by the Allison C20F engine. FAA, TC and EASA approved
Heli-Lynx 355FX2R
Powered by the Allison C20R engine. FAA and TC approved
Starflex AS355F1R
AS355 F1 powered by the Allison C20R engine. FAA, TC and EASA approved
Starflex AS355F2R
AS355 F2 Powered by the Allison C20R engine with optimised tail rotor blades. FAA, TC and EASA approved

== Operators ==
The AS355 Écureuil 2 is used by both private individuals and companies, helicopter charter and training organizations as well as law enforcement and government use.

=== Military and government operators ===
Algeria

- Algerian Air Force

Argentina

- Argentine Naval Prefecture

Australia
- Bernie Wainscott Helicopters
- Surf Life Saving South Australia
Austria

- Austrian Federal Police

Belarus

- Border Guard
- Ministry of Emergency Situations

Brazil

- Brazilian Air Force
- Brazilian Naval Aviation

Cambodia

- Royal Cambodian Air Force

Canada

- International Test Pilots School
- Ontario Provincial Police

Chile

- Chilean Army

Djibouti

- Djibouti Air Force

Jamaica

- Jamaica Defence Force

Malawi

- Malawi Air Wing

Malaysia

- Royal Malaysia Police

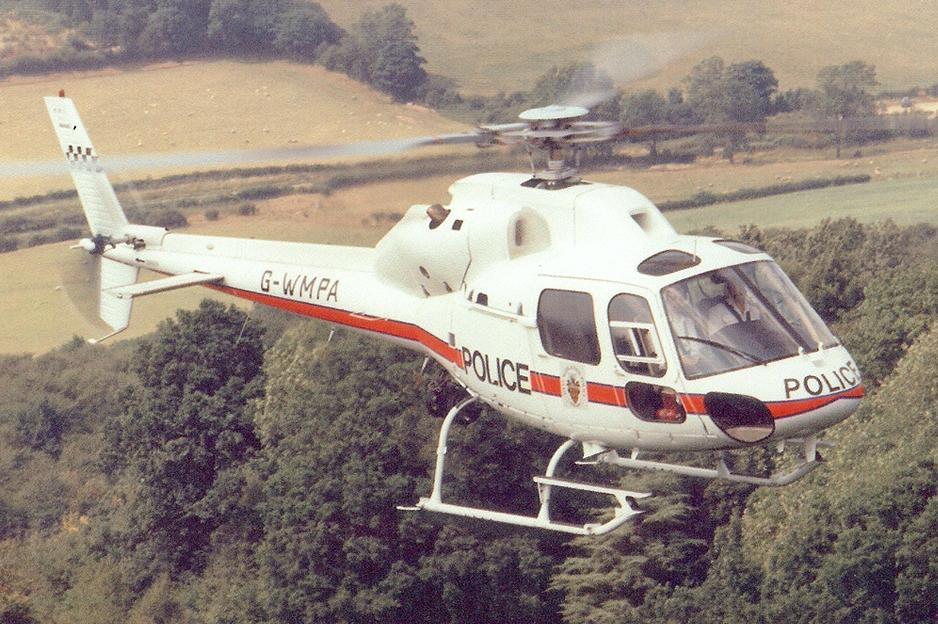
West Midlands Police's G-WMPA

Russia

- Ministry of Interior

Uruguay

- National Navy of Uruguay

United States

- Massachusetts State Police

=== Former operators ===
Bophuthatswana

- Bophuthatswana Air Force

Ireland

- Garda Air Support Unit

New Zealand

- New Zealand Police

== Accidents and incidents ==
- On 8 May 1992, the Western Australian Police Polair One helicopter crashed while attempting to land on a sports oval for a public display in Kelmscott. The helicopter was destroyed after a fire started in the engine bay following ground impact. The Bureau of Air Safety Investigation report determined "The helicopter probably entered a vortex ring state during the final approach". The pilot and crewman received minor injuries, and the two passengers serious injuries, as a result of the accident.
- On 22 October 1996, an AS355 F1 Squirrel, registration G-CFLT, crashed in bad weather near Middlewich, Cheshire, England, killing all five on board. The people on board included Matthew Harding, a businessman and vice chairman of English football club Chelsea F.C. (the flight was returning to London from a Chelsea match in Bolton). The UK's Air Accidents Investigation Branch found that the pilot had insufficient qualifications and experience to fly in such poor conditions; the agency also recommended a ban on commercial VFR helicopter night flying.
- In July 1998, the Kent Air Ambulance, an AS355 F1 Squirrel, crashed in good weather after colliding with power cables near Burham whilst returning to Rochester Airport following an aborted call to attend a road accident. All three crew – the pilot, Graham Budden, and two paramedics, Tony Richardson and Mark Darby – were killed on impact.
- On 2 May 2007, Chelsea Football Club Vice President Philip Carter, founder of training company Carter and Carter, crashed in his part-owned Twin Squirrel registration G-BYPA returning from Liverpool John Lennon Airport after watching Chelsea play Liverpool F.C.

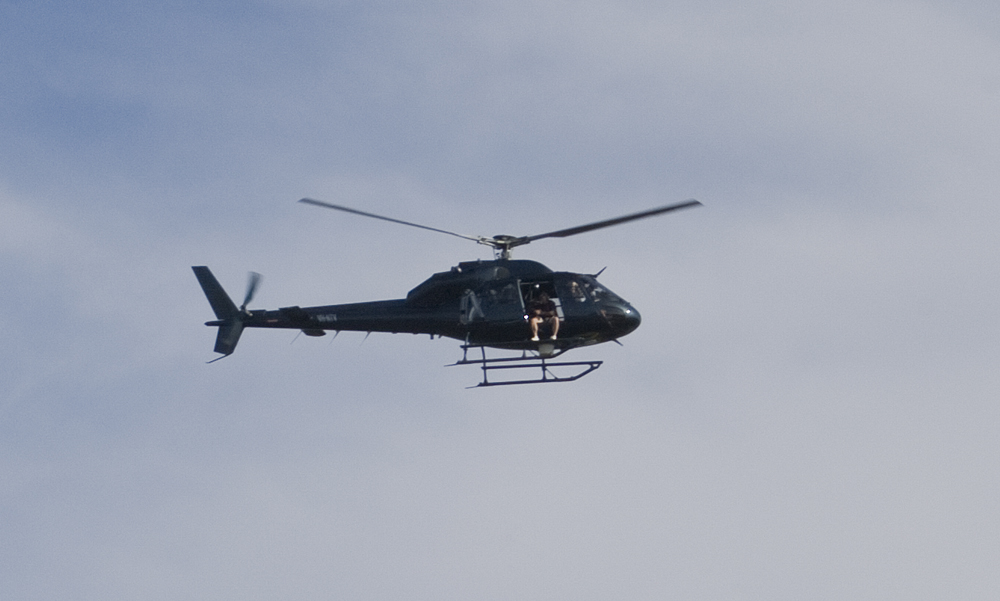
VH-NTV in December 2010

- On 18 August 2011, an AS-355F-2 (reg No/ VH-NTV) crashed near Lake Eyre in South Australia, resulting in three fatalities. The helicopter was owned by the Australian Broadcasting Corporation. On board were Gary Ticehurst, ABC's chief helicopter pilot for 25 years, cameraman John Bean and TV journalist Paul Lockyer. In response to the accident, Australia tightened the rules governing helicopter night flights.
- On 20 October 2011, a Belarus border patrol Eurocopter twin-engine helicopter crashed close to the village of Vileity near the Lithuanian border and burst into flames, killing all five people on board, including three members of a television crew.
- On 29 March 2017, a Eurocopter AS-355F-1 Ecureuil 2 was lost over the Snowdonia National Park in Wales whilst en route from Luton to Dublin, carrying five people on board.

== Specifications (AS355F2) ==
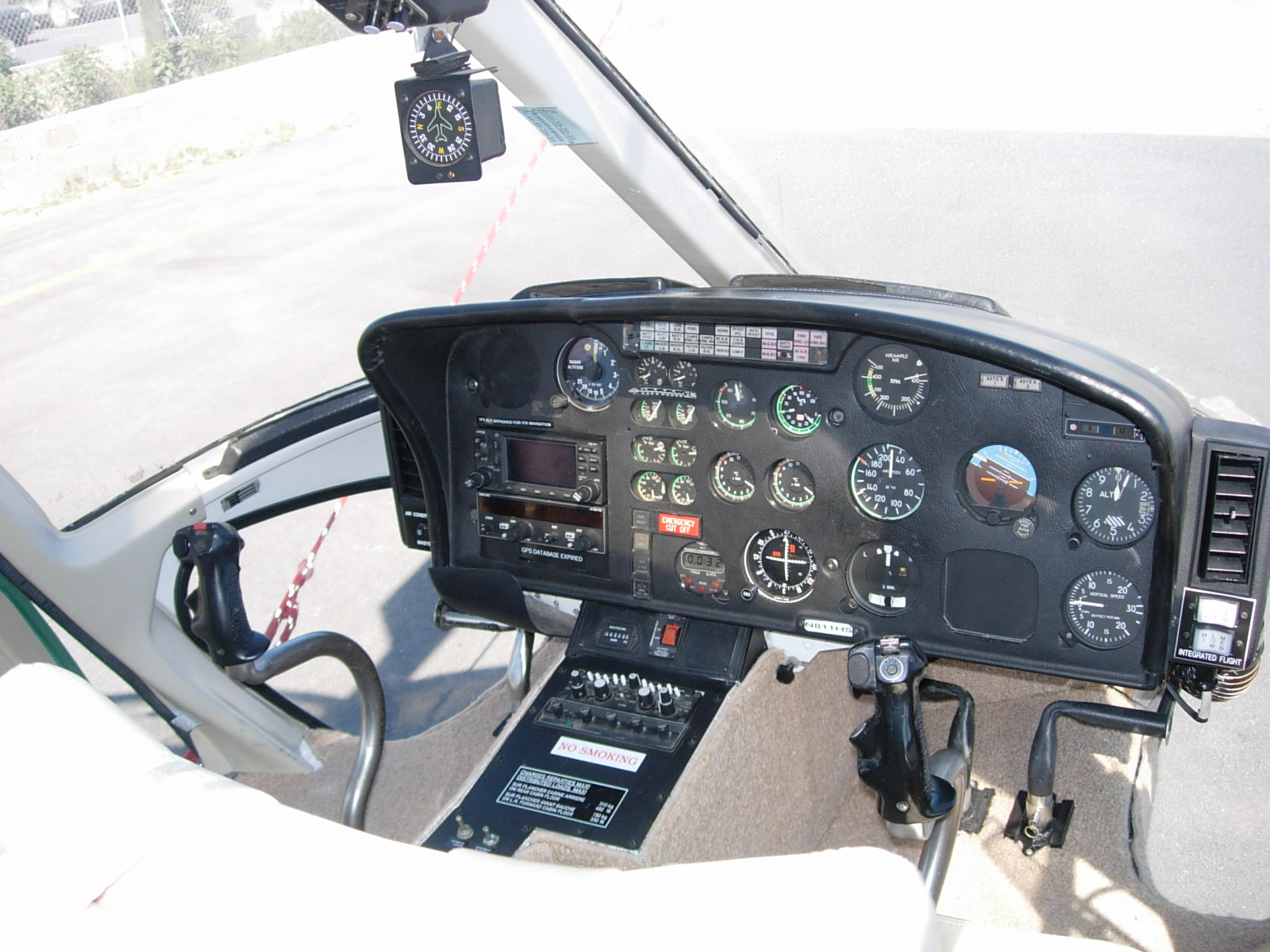
Cockpit of AS355 F1 Ecureuil 2

Data from Jane's All The World's Aircraft 1988–89

General characteristics

- Crew: 1
- Capacity: 6 /
- Length: 12.94 m (42 ft 5 in) inc. main and tail rotors

10.93 m (36 ft) fuselage and tail rotor only

- Height: 3.14 m (10 ft 4 in)
- Empty weight: 1,305 kg (2,877 lb)
- Max takeoff weight: 2,540 kg (5,600 lb) internal load

2,600 kg (5,732 lb) with max. slung load

- Fuel capacity: 730 L (190 US gal; 160 imp gal) usable, in two tanks
- Powerplant: 2 × Allison 250-C20F turboshaft engines, 313 kW (420 hp) each
- Main rotor diameter: 10.69 m (35 ft 1 in)
- Main rotor area: 89.75 m^{2} (966.1 sq ft)
- Blade aerofoil section: ONERA OA211 : root; ONERA OA209/OA207 : tip

Performance

- Cruise speed: 224 km/h (139 mph, 121 kn) (max cruise)
- Never exceed speed: 278 km/h (173 mph, 150 kn)
- Range: 703 km (437 mi, 380 nmi) with max fuel no reserve
- Service ceiling: 3,400 m (11,200 ft)
- Rate of climb: 6.5 m/s (1,280 ft/min)

== See also ==
Related development

- Eurocopter AS350 Écureuil
- Eurocopter AS555 Fennec
- Eurocopter EC130

Aircraft of comparable role, configuration, and era

- Bell 427
- MD Helicopters MD Explorer
- HAL Light Utility Helicopter

Related lists

- List of active United Kingdom military aircraft
