= Sam Garrison =

Sam Garrison may refer to:

- Sam Garrison (lawyer)
- Sam Garrison (politician)
