= Fannie Lee Chaney =

American civil rights activist

- Fannie Lee Chaney, photographed by Jim Marshall (photographer), as the FBI informed her of her son's death at the hands of the Ku Klux Klan in 1964.
- Born: Fannie Lee Roberts; September 4, 1921; Meridian, Mississippi, US
- Died: May 22, 2007 (aged 85); Willingboro Township, New Jersey, US
- Occupation: Baker
- Known for: Civil rights activist

Fannie Lee Chaney (née Roberts; September 4, 1921 – May 22, 2007) was an American baker turned civil rights activist after her son James Chaney was murdered by the Ku Klux Klan during the 1964 Freedom Summer rides in Mississippi.

After her son's murder, Chaney sued five restaurants in Meridian for racial discrimination. She was fired from her job and could not find other work. Crosses were burned on her lawn, and a firebomb intended for her family's house destroyed that of a neighbor. She moved to New York City, finding work at a nursing home. After 30 years, she retired and moved to New Jersey.

In 2005 she testified for the State of Mississippi in the murder case against Edgar Ray Killen, one of her son's killers. Killen was cleared of murder by the jury, but convicted of manslaughter and given a 60 years sentence, which he served until his death in January 2018.

== Early life ==
Fannie Lee Chaney was born on September 4, 1921, in Meridian, Mississippi, where she lived until 1965. She was born Fannie Lee Robert, but changed her name after marrying Ben Chaney Sr. Ben Chaney Sr. worked as a plasterer, and she worked as a baker, earning roughly $28 a week. The two had five children, two sons named James Earl Chaney, and Ben Chaney Jr., and three daughters named Barbara, Janice, and Julia. Her oldest son, James, became involved in the civil rights movement early in his life. Both Fannie Lee and Ben Sr. were skeptical of his work, however Fannie Lee learned more about the civil rights movement and ultimately supported her son's work. Ben Chaney Sr., however, did not support James' work. He eventually left the family.

== Freedom Summer ==
=== Mississippi Burning and Activism ===
Chaney's oldest son, James Earl Chaney became involved in the Freedom Summer movement in Mississippi, and as a result was murdered by the Ku Klux Klan with his co-workers Andrew Goodman and Michael Schwerner. These murders, known as the Mississippi Burning case, put a national spotlight on the family. In the aftermath of the murders, Chaney began giving speeches about racial justice and voting rights in Meridian. She also filed a racial discrimination lawsuit against five restaurants in Meridian after losing her job as a baker and being unable to find other work.

=== Backlash ===
Chaney and her family faced significant backlash as a result of her outspokenness on civil rights. She lost her job as a baker, and was unable to find work in Meridian. The family also received threatening phone calls, and their house as well as James' grave was repeatedly vandalized. A cross was burned on the family's lawn, and bullets were fired at their house.

=== Aftermath ===
As a result of the numerous hate crimes against her and her family in Meridian, Chaney and her family moved to Willows Point, New York in 1965. There, she began working as a cleaner at a nursing home, caring for her four children. In 2000, after 35 years in New York, Chaney retired and moved to Willingboro, New Jersey, where her daughter Julia lived.

== Edgar Ray Killen Trial ==
In 2005, Edgar Ray Killen, the Klansman who had orchestrated the murder of James Chaney was brought to trial. This trial, 41 years after the murders of James Chaney, Michael Schwerner, and Andrew Goodman, was in part a result of the work of the James Earl Chaney foundation, founded by Ben Chaney Jr. At the age of 82, Chaney returned to Mississippi to testify against Edgar Ray Killen. In her emotional testimony, she highlighted the relationship between her oldest son, James, and her youngest son, Ben. She also recounted the last time she saw James alive, leaving her house with the two men he was killed with, Michael Schwerner and Andrew Goodman. Her testimony also included an account of when she learned that her son had died, first hearing from a neighbor who notified her that they were unable to find James, and later learning his cause of death after seeing his burnt car on TV, testifying to the court that “J.E. never come back”. Her testimony also covered the violence and threats she faced after the murders. Her testimony lasted about 12 minutes, and there was no cross-examination.

Edgar Ray Killen was found guilty of three counts of manslaughter. Chaney was reportedly happy about the verdict, her son Ben saying that “she finally believes that the life of her son has some value to the people in this community”

== Death and legacy ==
Chaney passed away on the 22nd of May, 2007 from undisclosed causes. She was buried on June 2, 2007 in Okatibbee Baptist Church outside of Meridian, next to her son James. Her funeral service was held at First Union Missionary Baptist Church, the same church where James' funeral service was held. She is survived by her son, Ben Chaney Jr., as well as her three daughters Barbara Dailey, Janice Chaney, and Julia Chaney-Moss. She is also remembered by the James Earl Chaney Foundation, founded by Ben Chaney Jr., which now works to protect the constitutional rights of all Americans.
