= Jeremias Nguenha =

Mozambican musician

- Born: March 19, 1972; Inhambane
- Died: May 4, 2007 (aged 35)
- Occupation: Singer

Jeremias Nguenha (19 March 1972, Inhambane – 3 May 2007, Maputo) was a Mozambican musician. He sang in Shangaan.

== Early life, career and death ==
Nguenha started to sing in the church 'Assembleia de Deus' and by that time he pretended to be a pastor.

He started to sing in order to spread the message of social injustice and educative messages to the people. In 1994/1995 his songs appear like magic from scratch on the radios, being the most famous 'Vadhla Vôche'. In his words he pretended to: 'denounce the selfishness, hypocrisy and corruption that tainted the society'. His style was also used to shock the Mozambican public, who connected with his message quickly. He used to present himself with military clothes and a military type haircut, carrying the bible many times with him on stage. He soon released one of his biggest hits La Famba bicha ("The line goes on").

Ngenha gets the opportunity to make some international digressions to South Africa, where he performs to the Mozambican community. And in 2002 he is invited to Brazil, where he performs in the most famous celebration Rio Carnival. Due to financial constrains he goes alone, leaving his band in Mozambique.

In 2001, he was awarded with the Mozambican National prize - Ngoma Mozambique - for the most famous song. In the same year, the current president of that time - Joaquim Chissano - invites him to the official residence - Palácio da Ponta Vermelha. According to the press the only thing he asks the president is for the bible.

Even though he succeeded as a singer, he was also a football player, he played in Swaziland and South Africa. However a knee injury dictated the end of his career. Artistically he also performed as an actor.

On May 3, 2007, at the age of 35, the notice of his death due to illness shocked the entire Mozambique and the music association. The music association soon demanded that Mozambican artists should have better conditions for the artists since many of them died of illness, not having financial conditions to afford better health treatments for their condition. In previous years, the music association dealt with consecutive losses of artists due to illness.

== Sources ==
- "Morreu Jeremias Nguenha, um dos músicos mais críticos do poder". Noticias Lusofonas (in Portuguese). 4 May 2007. Archived from the original on 6 May 2021.
- "Jeremias Nguenha (1972-2007): o precoce desaparecimento de um homem do palco". Jornal Notícias (in Portuguese).
- "Faleceu esta noite o músico jovem moçambicano Jeremias Nguenha". Moçambique para todos (in Portuguese). 4 May 2007.
