= Bobby Ash =

British-Canadian actor

Robert William "Bobby" Ash (November 5, 1925 – May 20, 2007) was an English-born Canadian actor who became known to children in the Toronto area as Uncle Bobby the host of The Uncle Bobby Show on local station CFTO-TV.

== Early years ==
Robert Ash was born in Walsall, England into a family of actors and was brought up in the "pirate" circuses of Britain. Ash's entertainment career began as a child actor with a role in No Mother to Guide Her. During World War II, Ash performed for the British Forces in Stars in Battledress. Ash also worked as a comedy performer and circus clown.

== Moving to Canada ==
After immigrating to Canada (leaving his parents and an unknown woman), Ash answered an advertisement for a television role as a clown in the CFTO program The Professor's Hideaway in 1959. He appeared on CFTO when it began broadcasting in 1961. (The character of Kiddo later went on to his own show, with a different actor.) After Ash left his first show, he returned to Britain, but returned shortly to Canada to create a new program for CFTO (from 1962 to 1979). Ash took early education course at Seneca College to help his work on television.

== Retirement and death ==
Even after retirement Ash continued to live in Toronto (Guildwood) and worked on children's books.

Ash later moved north to Elliot Lake from Toronto and died there of a heart attack on May 20, 2007.

== Bibliography ==
- Ash, Robert (2005). Corky the Clown's Halloween. Illustrated by Amy Thibeault. Ilfracombe: Arthur H. Stockwell Limited. ISBN 978-0-72233697-7.
