= Kevin Ruane =

English journalist

- Born: 20 May 1932; Liverpool, Merseyside, England
- Died: 3 December 2018 (aged 86); Canberra, Australia
- Occupation: Journalist
- Years active: 1955–1986
- Children: 2

Kevin Ruane (20 May 1932 – 3 December 2018) was an English journalist. He was a member of the BBC Monitoring Service at Caversham montoring Soviet broadcasts until he became the foreign deputy editor at the BBC Radio newsroom in 1968. Ruane was later foreign desk editor at BBC Radio 4 before he became a foreign correspondent and then Moscow correspondent from 1977 to 1980. He worked as Eastern European correspondent between 1980 and 1986, when he retired from the BBC. Ruane was presented with the Knight's Cross of the Order of Merit of the Republic of Poland in 2013.

== Early life ==
Ruane was born in Liverpool on 20 May 1932, the son of a professional gardener. At school, a teacher noticed his ability to speak ancient Greek, leading him to read classics at Peterhouse, Cambridge. Following graduation, Ruane did his national service with the British Army's Royal Artillery and learnt Russian after his commanding officer asked, on his daughter's behalf, if he would sell raffle tickets to benefit the Little Children of Mary.

== Career ==
Enrolling on the Army Russian course and the one-year at Cambridge led him following National Service to join GCHQ at its communications centre Cheltenham and then to the BBC Monitoring Service at Caversham in 1955; he was the sole non-Russian in the Russian monitoring service and listened in to Soviet broadcasts. Ruane remained at Caversham for 13 years until he was promoted to foreign deputy editor at the BBC Radio newsroom at Broadcasting House in 1968. He worked as the foreign desk editor at BBC Radio 4 before he became a foreign correspondent. In the role, Ruane travelled widely and covered such events as the Resignation of Richard Nixon from Washington D.C. He was the presenter of the weekly foreign press round-up on BBC Radio 3 and was a frequent producer of the radio programme From Our Own Correspondent.

In December 1976, Ruane was appointed the BBC's Moscow correspondent, replacing Philip Short, whom he deputised for two months in 1975. He began working in the role on 14 February 1977, reporting on the goings-on in the Soviet Union, presenting BBC Radio 3's Six Continents with clips from foreign radio broadcasts. Ruane reported on the trial of the Moscow Helsinki Group founder Yuri Orlov and a demonstration by Ugandan students against the regime of Idi Amin outside the Ugandan embassy in Moscow. He reported on religion and national identity in Armenia for Newsday on BBC2, and on the Britain Today Exhibition from Novosibirsk, the Siberian capital. Ruane was appointed Eastern European correspondent in 1980, and relocated to Warsaw in 1981. He published the book, The Polish Challenge, in June 1982. In late 1982, Ruane was instructed to leave Poland because officials from the Ministry of Foreign Affairs told him that his press credentials would not be renewed following the broadcast of the Panorama programme Two Weeks in Winter about the imposition of martial law in 1981. His press accreditation was restored by Polish officials in April 1983. In April 1984, Ruane was questioned by authorities in connection of an investigation into the humans rights lawyer Władysław Siła-Nowicki and how he came into possession of a latter by the latter accusing the authorities of law breaking and covering up the death of a teenage schoolboy by police.

He left the BBC in 1986 and moved to Australia. In retirement, Ruane authored a second book, To Kill a Priest, concerning the murder of the parish priest Jerzy Popiełuszko by the secret police.

== Personal life ==
He was married to Margaret (Maggie) and the couple had two children. Ruane was the recipient of three medals from the Polish state for his contribution to Poland. He was given the Knight's Cross of the Order of Merit of the Republic of Poland in June 2013. Following a brief illness, Ruane died in Canberra on 3 December 2018.
