= Book token =

Type of gift voucher

A book token is a traditional form of gift voucher similar to modern gift cards redeemable in hundreds of participating bookshops as an alternative to cash.

== History ==
The term "book token" was first coined in the 1920s by Harold Raymond, an English publisher who noticed that for Christmas his friends had received a collective total of only three books out of 119 total gifts. He felt that some sort of coupon could be used to take the risk out of giving books as gifts. Book tokens were first officially distributed in November of 1932, just in time for the holidays.

In the 1990s, "lick and stick" stamps were replaced with tokens in voucher form, to resemble British currency.

== Current versions ==
=== UK ===
Book Tokens Ltd (part of the Booksellers Association Group of Companies) was established as the sole issuer of book tokens in the UK. They have now grown into one of the largest multi-retail gift cards in the UK and Ireland and were renamed "National Book Tokens" in 2000, the year the tokens were also sold online for the first time by firstbookshop.com. The seller of electronic book tokens promises the gift card will be able to be used at any time at all reputable book sellers with the exception of airports and some train stations. The cards do expire every two years but can be replaced for free. Gift givers can choose from different designs and receive promotions such as free books by Penguin when spending more than a certain amount.

=== Other countries ===
National book voucher schemes are also run in the United States, Australia, New Zealand, the Netherlands, Norway, Switzerland, and Japan.
