= Walker H. Land =

American professor of bioengineering

Walker Haden Land, Jr. (born May 29, 1932) is a former research professor in the Department of Bioengineering at Binghamton University. Land joined the faculty at Binghamton after a long career at IBM, and has publications in the fields of complex adaptive systems, statistical learning theory, bioinformatics, and cancer research.

With his background in creating code and years of work at companies like IBM, Land was instrumental in perfecting the weights and bias for codes that are capable of solving complex adaptive systems.

== Early life ==
Land worked at IBM for 27 years after being honorably discharged from the United States Air Force. He was responsible for research and development in statistical and stochastic processes, Bayesian inference, artificial intelligence, expert systems, coherent processing, neural networks, and guidance and location systems. Land also participated in development and evaluation of guidance systems for the Saturn and Apollo vehicles, as well as worked with post-Apollo space configurations, including the Space Shuttle. He made calculations for the original Apollo mission to circle the Moon and come back to Earth. The initial conditions in his calculation included the then-nine planets as well as all of their then-known moons.
