= Cy Leonard =

Cy Leonard (1926 – May 20, 2008) was a Canadian entertainer who was the first ventriloquist to perform on Canadian television. He also appeared on The Adventures of Tugboat Annie, the first Canadian-made situation comedy. He made several guest appearances on CBC-TV's The Tommy Hunter Show and was a regular feature on The Uncle Bobby Show, where his brother Ron Leonard was the featured magician.

In 1941, Leonard joined the Royal Canadian Air Force and was sent to entertain Allied troops in Europe. He also was hired by the Canadian government in 1978 and 1980 to entertain Canadian troops.

Leonard claimed to have "probably" been the first disk jockey, in 1939.

== Family ==
Leonard's granddaughter is singer and voice actress Emilie-Claire Barlow.
