= Phillip Carter (businessman) =

Phillip Carter (16 May 1962 – 2 May 2007) was a British businessman. He founded Carter & Carter in 1992 after a career in sales and marketing at Imperial Chemical Industries, including being the European Business Development Manager of the Paints Division. Carter was named Entrepreneur of the Year at 2007's PLC Awards.

A lifelong Chelsea fan, Carter was an honorary vice president of the club.

On 1 May 2007 he attended the UEFA Champions League semi-final second leg at Anfield against Liverpool. His jointly owned Twin Squirrel helicopter left Liverpool John Lennon Airport at 23:00 for Thornhaugh, Peterborough where Carter lived with his wife Judith and two children. The helicopter last made radio contact two hours later. On the morning of 2 May the Cambridgeshire Constabulary found the virtually intact wreckage of G-BYPA at woods in Kings Cliffe, near Wansford, Peterborough. The helicopter was piloted by Stephen Holdich, co-owner of operating company Atlas Helicopters, who had piloted Carter over 70 times in the past four years. The other occupants were believed to be Carter's son Andrew aged 17, and his lifelong friend Jonathan Waller. An AAIB inquiry into the accident concluded the most likely cause of the accident was pilot disorientation, although the possibility that the pilot had had an epileptic seizure could not be completely ruled out.
