= John Zamet =

English periodontist (1932-2007)

John Zamet FDS
- Born: 11 November 1932; London, England
- Died: 5 May 2007 (aged 74)
- Education: Royal Dental Hospital; Royal College of Surgeons of England; University of Pennsylvania; University College London
- Occupation: Periodontist
- Known for: First periodontal practice in London, 1966; Holocaust studies
- Medical career
- Institutions: Eastman Dental Hospital; Guy's Hospital; Royal Dental Hospital

John Saville Zamet FDS (11 November 1932 - 5 May 2007) was a periodontist in the United Kingdom. He established the first exclusively periodontal practice in London in 1966.

After he retired, he attended the University College Hospital and took a course in Holocaust studies, leading him to write the biographies of refugee dental surgeons in the UK, and assess their skills as a missed opportunity for improving the ordinary quality of interwar British dental surgery. He died shortly after completing his PhD thesis on German and Austrian Refugee Dentists 1933–1945, The Response of The British Authorities in 2007. His PhD degree was awarded posthumously and his thesis remains unpublished.

== Early life and career ==
John Zamet was born in London on 11 November 1932.

In 1958, three years after completing his studies in dentistry at the Royal Dental Hospital (RDH), he obtained his fellowship in dental surgery of the Royal College of Surgeons of England.

With an interest in periodontology, between 1956 and 1962, he worked in the departments at the Eastman Dental Hospital, Guy's Hospital and the RDH. At the time the subject was still in its infancy in the UK. Although in the US the speciality was long established, the first British academic department was only set up in 1948 at the Eastman Dental Hospital, under W. G. Cross.

He went to America in 1962 on a post-graduate fellowship to study at the University of Pennsylvania Department of Periodontics. There he came under the influence of periodontologist D. Walter Cohen.

=== Return to London and senior posts ===
On his return to the UK, Zamet was appointed senior lecturer at the RDH, and later consultant in periodontology at University College Hospital (UCH) Dental School. After the closure of the UCH school Zamet moved to the Eastman as honorary consultant in periodontology. He stayed there until he retired in 2001.

Whilst at UCH and the Eastman, Zamet carried out several research projects. In 1974 he was awarded an MPhil degree by the University of London for his dissertation, A Comparative Clinical Study of Three Periodontal Surgical techniques, which examined clinical outcomes of surgical periodontal therapy. Other research was carried out into particulate bioglass grafts.

In 1966, Zamet established the first, and for many years the only, singularly periodontal practice in London. He was also the first UK periodontist to participate in the Brånemark Osseointegration Programme in Gothenburg. This programme stemmed from when, in 1952 Per-Ingvar Brånemark put titanium-encased optical devices into the legs of rabbits to study the healing process. At the end of the research period, after removing the devices, they discovered unexpectedly that the titanium had fused into the bone and could not be removed. He called the process osseointegration. The toleration to long-term presence of titanium led to the potential for new research in using it to create an anchor for artificial teeth.

Zamet pursued recognition for periodontology as a UK speciality and played an influential role in the establishment of the General Dental Council's Specialist Register in Periodontology.

== Other roles ==
=== Societies ===
He took up responsibilities in numerous societies, including President, Honorary Vice-president and Honorary Life Member of the British Society of Periodontology, a Life Member of the American Academy of Periodontology and an Honorary Member of the American Dental Society of London.

=== Alpha Omega International Dental Fraternity ===
At a time when Jewish students were not allowed to form social groups, a group of Jewish dental students founded The Alpha Omega International Dental Fraternity in 1907 at the University of Maryland School of Dental Medicine, which claims to be the oldest international dental organisation and the oldest international Jewish medical organisation. It eventually incorporated over 100 alumni and student chapters in ten countries.

Zamet became the first and twenty-fifth chairman of the London chapter of the Alpha Omega dental fraternity, which sponsored numerous projects in the UK and Israel. He also served as secretary of its London Charitable Trust.

At one time, he liaised with Walter Annenberg and obtained funding for postgraduate education and the Annenberg Lecture and Traveling Scholarship.

== Retirement and Holocaust studies ==
Zamet retired in 2001, following which he enrolled at University College London in Holocaust studies, where he was a student of Michael Berkowitz. After completing an MA, he furthered his studies by working on a PhD thesis on German and Austrian Refugee Dentists 1933–1945, The Response of The British Authorities. In the 1930s and 1940s, displaced doctors searched the world for locations where their skills might be appreciated and where they could find a place of safety from worsening Nazi persecution. As part of his thesis, in 2005, Zamet wrote to the British Dental Journal as he attempted to "reconstruct the history of this brave group of professionals, who despite the odds, succeeded in a foreign country which did not want them".

He recreated the biographies of refugee dental surgeons, and assessed their qualifications and skills as a missed opportunity for improving the quantity and quality of interwar British dental surgery. As a result, he established many contacts with surviving refugees and their families, assembling a unique compilation of sources. His research has been described by medical historian Paul Weindling as "outstanding" and "exceptional". Zamet compared dental training at the University of Vienna with that in Britain in the 1930s, concluding that the "dilapidated state of British dental health and dentistry" at that time was a "cottage industry". Despite demonstrating a British need for them, of the 360 Viennese dental surgeons (stomatologists) that applied to the General Medical Council (GMC) to register on the Dental Register, there being no General Dental Council until 1956, only 41 were granted registration, and only after re-certification. Many of those disallowed registration and therefore denied entry to the UK, "despite their excellent training, probably died during the Holocaust" or were led to suicide.

== Death and legacy ==
Weindling attributes the loss of records and lack of archival material on migrant practitioners in general to the delay in "Vergangenheitsbewältigung", that is, the coming to terms with the past. He consequently relates Zamet as a "pioneer" in this field and a historian of refugee dental surgeons, while other medical professionals have yet to find their historian.

Zamet completed his PhD thesis in December 2006. He died on 5 May 2007, and his PhD degree was awarded posthumously in 2007.

In acknowledgement of his contributions to periodontology, in 2011 the London Chapter and Charitable Trust established a John Zamet Memorial Prize in Periodontal Research open to UK-based postgraduate dental students studying for a master's degree or PhD who are undertaking or who have recently completed original research associated with clinical periodontology. It is awarded every second year.

== Selected works ==
=== Book chapters ===
- "Periodontics, the frontier" in The British Society of Periodontology, the First 50 Years, 1999.

=== Articles ===
- "Glickman's Clinical Periodontology, a book review", Journal of the Royal Society of Medicine, Vol. 72, July 1979, pp. 545–546.
- "Particulate bioglass as a grafting material in the treatment of periodontal intrabony defects". Journal of Clinical Periodontology, Vol. 24, No. 6 (June 1997), pp. 410–418. (Joint with U.R. Darbar, G.S. Griffiths, J.S. Bulman, U. Brägger, W. Bürgin, H. N. Newman) doi:10.1111/j.1600-051x.1997.tb00205.x.
- "Aliens or Colleagues? Refugees from Nazi Oppression 1933-1945", British Dental Journal, Vol. 201, No. 6 (September 2006), pp. 397–407.
- "The Anschluss and the Problem of Refugee Stomatologists", Social History of Medicine, Vol. 22, Issue 3 (1 December 2009), pp. 471–488. doi:10.1093/shm/hkp097

=== Unpublished ===
- "German and Austrian Refugee Dentists: The Response of the British Authorities, 1933–1945". Oxford Brookes University, 2007. Unpublished PhD thesis.
