= Carter & Carter =

British-based public limited company

Carter & Carter Group plc was a British-based public limited company that provided outsourced training services and apprenticeships on behalf of various international companies and UK government organisations, such as the Learning and Skills Council.

Established by Phillip Carter in 1992, the company employed 500 people and had its headquarters in Ruddington, Nottinghamshire, England, with offices in the US, Australia, Germany and Japan.

Following the death of founder Philip Carter in a helicopter accident on 2 May 2007, the company's shares were suspended on 3 October due to the uncertainty of its financial position.

In early March 2008, Carter & Carter entered into administration after it failed to reach agreement with its banks over a financial restructuring. Near to the end of the month, Newcastle College bought the majority of the company.

== History ==
- 1992 - Established by Phillip Carter as an outsource provider of accident repair services
- 1996 - Established US operations with General Motors, Ford, BMW, Mercedes, Nissan, Jaguar, Volvo, Audi, Bently, VW as clients
- 1997 - Wins Audi Academy contract in UK, establishing company in training and learning sector
- 2001 - Bridgepoint Capital invests in the business
- 2003 - Acquires the EMTEC Group, an established automotive training company
- 2005 - Acquires The Automobile Association technical training services group. Initial IPO launched in February. In September acquires ASSA, a provider of UK Government training in food manufacturing and engineering
- 2006 - Acquires Fern Group, a provider of training to unemployed and disabled people under Jobcentre Plus' 'New Deal'. In March acquires ReMIT, the second largest apprentice training provider in the motor industry, bringing the total number of learners managed in the automotive retail sector to over 12,000. In December, acquired the training division of Quantica, NTP Ltd and IMS (UK) Ltd
- 2007 - After the death of Phil Carter, the company enters a period of uncertainty. Contracts with manufacturers and contractors are ended and a huge proportion of the companies workforce are made redundant.
- 2008 - Carter & Carter enter into administration in March.
