= Sam Garrison (lawyer) =

American lawyer (1942–2007)

Commonwealth's Attorney
- In office 1969

Counsel to the House Judiciary Committee
- In office 1971

Member of the Virginia Council on Human Rights
- In office 2003

Personal details
- Born: February 21, 1942
- Died: May 27, 2007 (aged 65)
- Education: University of Virginia
- Occupation: lawyer

Sam Garrison III (February 21, 1942 – May 27, 2007) was an American lawyer, probably best known for his role as minority counsel for the House Judiciary Committee, defending President Richard Nixon in the 1974 impeachment hearings, and for his subsequent gay activism.

== Early years ==
Garrison graduated as valedictorian of the 1959 class of Roanoke Catholic High School, aged 17. He was president of his fraternity at the University of Virginia, where he received an undergraduate degree in 1963, and then a law degree in 1966. From there he became an assistant commonwealth's attorney in his home town of Roanoke, and by 1969, at age 27, became the youngest person elected as the Commonwealth's Attorney.

== National politics, and Watergate ==
In 1971, he moved to Washington to be staff counsel to the House Judiciary Committee, and just 16 months later, he joined the staff of newly elected Vice President Spiro Agnew as legislative liaison. After Agnew resigned in 1973, Garrison began working on the House Judiciary Committee's impeachment staff, and eventually replaced the committee's chief minority counsel, Albert E. Jenner Jr., who called the impeachment case against Nixon persuasive.

In an obituary The Washington Post wrote:

Garrison, then 32, was the last-minute replacement chosen by the committee's 17 Republicans to present the minority view of the case against Nixon. With just days to prepare, he submitted a 41-page argument against impeachment.

"By all accounts, Sam Garrison did not exactly hit a home run", reporter William Greider wrote in The Washington Post on July 23, 1974. "But his performance satisfied the senior Republicans who wanted someone, for appearance's sake if nothing else, to argue the soft spots in the Judiciary Committee's evidence."

"The question," Mr. Garrison said at the time, "is whether the public interest would better be served or not served by the removal of the president."

== Back to Roanoke ==
Garrison later moved back to Roanoke, and later ran into financial and legal problems. The Washington Post noted: "He was a partner in a failed Roanoke restaurant and disco. The business had $1 million in debts when it closed, and Mr. Garrison declared bankruptcy. His partner, left with the debt, conspired to kill him to recover $300,000 in insurance, a court later found.

In 1980, as a court-appointed attorney representing a bankrupt mobile home firm in Georgia, Garrison was indicted in a $46,000 theft from its trust. He was convicted and disbarred and served four months of a one-year sentence. (In 1993, the Virginia Supreme Court restored Garrison's law license).

In 1982 he publicly revealed that he was gay. Subsequently, he joined the Democratic Party and became active in party politics and in the gay rights movement, among other things, unsuccessfully campaigning for Virginia to repeal its anti-sodomy laws.

He was appointed in 2003 to the Virginia Council on Human Rights by Governor Mark R. Warner.
