= Uncle Bobby =

Canadian children's television show (1964-79)

Uncle Bobby is a Canadian children's television show that aired from 1964 to 1979 on Toronto's CFTO and, for two years beginning in 1968, was a weekly show on the CTV television network (although it continued to be aired on local CTV stations across Canada thereafter). In its later run the show was known as Uncle Bobby and Friends and, in 1979, the show was renamed Kid's Corner and lasted for a few more years as a syndicated Saturday morning offering (and into the early 1990s in repeats on YTV).

The half-hour show starred Bobby Ash (1924–2007), a former comedian and circus clown who had moved to Canada from the United Kingdom. The show aired weekdays over noonhour and featured staples such as "Bimbo: The Birthday Clown", a stationary cardboard cut-out who would come out of his closet, with a booming laugh, to the tune of Jim Reeves's Bimbo as Uncle Bobby announced that day's birthday greetings. Accompanying Bimbo were three puppets on a string, Wilson, Keppel and Betty, named after British music hall performers, who would "dance" to Bimbo's theme. The show featured regulars such as guitarist and singer Alex Laurier, Meredith Cutting (the singing police officer), ventriloquists Jack O'Reilly with his partner Daniel O'Rourke, and Cy Leonard and his partner Happy, magician Ron Leonard, accordionist Nancy McCaig, wildlife artist Barry Kent MacKay, clay artist Ruth Winkler, and Traffic Officer John (Big Big John) with safety tips for children. Uncle Bobby's catch phrase was "MMMM...BOBBY'S HERE!!!" Produced out of CFTO's Channel Nine Court studios, executive producers were Gerry Rochon, and, in the later years, Wayne Dayton. Children would also appear on the show and would be referred to by Uncle Bobby as "bobbysoxers." Maclean's magazine described Uncle Bobby as "avuncular without being condescending."

Ash had previously played a clown on Professor's Hideaway starring former BBC Radio star Stan Francis. He then went to England for three years and, upon his return, was given the job of Uncle Bobby on his own show. He did not earn very much from the show and had to support himself by moonlighting as a school bus driver in Scarborough, Ontario. He retired to Elliot Lake, where he died May 20, 2007, of a heart attack at age 82.

Ash was reportedly on set during the filming of the 1976's motion picture Network. The film was shot partially at the CTV News studios in Toronto, and Ash was reportedly just off camera during the filming of the famous scene where Howard Beale (portrayed by Peter Finch) proclaimed "I'm as mad as hell, and I'm not going to take this anymore!"
