= List of The New York Times number-one books of 1940 =

This is a list of books that topped The New York Times best-seller list in 1940. When the list began in 1931 through 1941 it only reflected sales in the New York City area.

== Fiction ==
The following list ranks the number-one best-selling fiction books.

The two most popular books that year were How Green Was My Valley, by Richard Llewellyn, which held on top of the list for 13 weeks, and Stars on the Sea by F. Van Wyck Mason, which was on top of the list for 10 weeks.

Date	Book	Author
January 1	The Nazarene	Sholem Asch
January 8	The Nazarene	Sholem Asch
January 15	The Nazarene	Sholem Asch
January 22	The Nazarene	Sholem Asch
January 29	The Nazarene	Sholem Asch
February 5	Kitty Foyle	Christopher Morley
February 12	The Nazarene	Sholem Asch
February 19	Kitty Foyle	Christopher Morley
February 26	Kitty Foyle	Christopher Morley
March 4	How Green Was My Valley	Richard Llewellyn
March 11	How Green Was My Valley	Richard Llewellyn
March 18	Native Son	Richard Wright
March 25	How Green Was My Valley	Richard Llewellyn
April 1	How Green Was My Valley	Richard Llewellyn
April 8	How Green Was My Valley	Richard Llewellyn
April 15	How Green Was My Valley	Richard Llewellyn
April 22	How Green Was My Valley	Richard Llewellyn
April 29	How Green Was My Valley	Richard Llewellyn
May 6	How Green Was My Valley	Richard Llewellyn
May 13	How Green Was My Valley	Richard Llewellyn
May 20	How Green Was My Valley	Richard Llewellyn
May 27	How Green Was My Valley	Richard Llewellyn
June 3	How Green Was My Valley	Richard Llewellyn
June 10	Stars on the Sea	F. Van Wyck Mason
June 17	Stars on the Sea	F. Van Wyck Mason
June 24	Stars on the Sea	F. Van Wyck Mason
July 1	Stars on the Sea	F. Van Wyck Mason
July 8	Stars on the Sea	F. Van Wyck Mason
July 15	Stars on the Sea	F. Van Wyck Mason
July 22	Stars on the Sea	F. Van Wyck Mason
July 29	Stars on the Sea	F. Van Wyck Mason
August 5	Stars on the Sea	F. Van Wyck Mason
August 12	Stars on the Sea	F. Van Wyck Mason
August 19	Mrs. Miniver	Jan Struther
August 26	Mrs. Miniver	Jan Struther
September 2	Mrs. Miniver	Jan Struther
September 9	The Beloved Returns	Thomas Mann
September 16	The Beloved Returns	Thomas Mann
September 23	Mrs. Miniver	Jan Struther
September 30	You Can't Go Home Again	Thomas Wolfe
October 7	You Can't Go Home Again	Thomas Wolfe
October 14	Mrs. Miniver	Jan Struther
October 21	Mrs. Miniver	Jan Struther
October 28	For Whom the Bell Tolls	Ernest Hemingway
November 4	For Whom the Bell Tolls	Ernest Hemingway
November 11	For Whom the Bell Tolls	Ernest Hemingway
November 18	For Whom the Bell Tolls	Ernest Hemingway
November 25	For Whom the Bell Tolls	Ernest Hemingway
December 2	Oliver Wiswell	Kenneth Roberts
December 9	Oliver Wiswell	Kenneth Roberts
December 16	Oliver Wiswell	Kenneth Roberts
December 23	Oliver Wiswell	Kenneth Roberts
December 30	Oliver Wiswell	Kenneth Roberts

== Nonfiction ==
The following list ranks the number-one best-selling nonfiction books.

Date	Book	Author
January 1	A Treasury of Art Masterpieces	Thomas Craven, editor
January 8	A Treasury of Art Masterpieces	Thomas Craven, editor
January 15	A Treasury of Art Masterpieces	Thomas Craven, editor
January 22	Country Lawyer	Bellamy Partridge
January 29	A Smattering of Ignorance	Oscar Levant
February 5	A Smattering of Ignorance	Oscar Levant
February 12	A Smattering of Ignorance	Oscar Levant
February 19	A Smattering of Ignorance	Oscar Levant
February 26	A Smattering of Ignorance	Oscar Levant
March 4	A Smattering of Ignorance	Oscar Levant
March 11	A Smattering of Ignorance	Oscar Levant
March 18	A Smattering of Ignorance	Oscar Levant
March 25	A Smattering of Ignorance	Oscar Levant
April 1	How to Read a Book	Mortimer J. Adler
April 8	How to Read a Book	Mortimer J. Adler
April 15	How to Read a Book	Mortimer J. Adler
April 22	A Smattering of Ignorance	Oscar Levant
April 29	How to Read a Book	Mortimer J. Adler
May 6	Failure of a Mission	Nevile Henderson
May 13	American White Paper	Joseph Alsop and Robert E. Kintner
May 20	American White Paper	Joseph Alsop and Robert E. Kintner
May 27	American White Paper	Joseph Alsop and Robert E. Kintner
June 3	American White Paper	Joseph Alsop and Robert E. Kintner
June 10	I Married Adventure	Osa Johnson
June 17	I Married Adventure	Osa Johnson
June 24	I Married Adventure	Osa Johnson
July 1	I Married Adventure	Osa Johnson
July 8	I Married Adventure	Osa Johnson
July 15	As I Remember Him	Hans Zinsser
July 22	As I Remember Him	Hans Zinsser
July 29	Country Squire in the White House	John T. Flynn
August 5	Country Squire in the White House	John T. Flynn
August 12	Country Squire in the White House	John T. Flynn
August 19	Country Squire in the White House	John T. Flynn
August 26	Country Squire in the White House	John T. Flynn
September 2	Country Squire in the White House	John T. Flynn
September 9	Country Squire in the White House	John T. Flynn
September 16	Country Squire in the White House	John T. Flynn
September 23	Country Squire in the White House	John T. Flynn
September 30	Country Squire in the White House	John T. Flynn
October 7	Country Squire in the White House	John T. Flynn
October 14	Country Squire in the White House	John T. Flynn
October 21	Country Squire in the White House	John T. Flynn
October 28	Country Squire in the White House	John T. Flynn
November 4	Country Squire in the White House	John T. Flynn
November 11	The Wave of the Future	Anne Morrow Lindbergh
November 18	The Wave of the Future	Anne Morrow Lindbergh
November 25	A Treasury of the World's Great Letters	M. Lincoln Schuster, editor
December 2	A Treasury of the World's Great Letters	M. Lincoln Schuster, editor
December 9	A Treasury of the World's Great Letters	M. Lincoln Schuster, editor
December 16	A Treasury of the World's Great Letters	M. Lincoln Schuster, editor
December 23	The White Cliffs	Alice Duer Miller
December 30	A Treasury of the World's Great Letters	M. Lincoln Schuster, editor

== See also ==
- Publishers Weekly list of bestselling novels in the United States in the 1940s
