= Mary Elizabeth Byrne =

Irish linguist and author (1880–1931)

- Born: 2 July 1880; Dublin, Ireland
- Died: 19 January 1931 (aged 50); Dublin, Ireland
- Education: Dominican Convent; Royal University of Ireland; University College, Dublin (M.A.)
- Occupations: Author, researcher and linguist

Mary Elizabeth Byrne (2 July 1880 – 19 January 1931) was an Irish linguist, author and journalist.

She is known for her contributions to Irish-language academia and as the translator of the Early Middle Irish prayer, Rob tu mo bhoile, into English as "Be Thou My Vision" in the journal Ériu in 1905.

== Background ==
Mary Byrne was born on 2 July 1880 at 1 Rae Cavendish, Dublin. Her father, Charles, was a stationer at the time, but by 1901 they were living in his news agency at 35 Upper Sackville Street. Charles was from Athy, Co. Kildare. When he died on 17 March 1909, it was announced in Irish in An Claidheamh Soluis. Her mother, Mary Doran, was a Dubliner. In the 1901 Census, her older sister Angela is living with them and in 1911 it is Mary herself who fills in the census form in Irish.

== Education ==
Mary attended school at the Dominican Convent of Our Lady of Sion in Eccles Street. Founded in 1882, the school prepared girls to engage in professions and attend university. In 1885, it became the first Catholic girls' school to provide university classes for women taking the Royal Universityexaminations.

Byrne passed the Royal University matriculation and her name is among the students registered in University College, Dublin, in 1901. She attained a master's degree with first-class honours in 1905 and was awarded the Chancellor's gold medal for English prose.

The same year, she put her name to a petition calling for applicants for scholarships to be given a simple exam in Irish and for girls to be eligible to apply. In 1906, she won a scholarship to the School of Advanced Studies in Irish. She was a member of the student council as long as she was there, along with R. I. Best, Pádraig Ó Brolcháin, Seosamh Laoide, Máire Ní Chinnéide, James George O’Keefe, Eoghan Ó Neachtain and Éamonn Ó Néill.

== Language activism ==
Byrne was a member of Conradh na Gaeilge in 1906 and was on the committee of Craobh na gCúig gCúigí (Five Provinces Branch) in 1907. From October 1915 onwards, she was in charge of an Old Irish team in that branch and she would go on to become vice-president.

== Academic career ==
She spent a lot of time working on the Royal Irish Academy's Dictionary of the Irish Language after being selected, along with Maud Joynt as assistants to Carl Marstrander in 1909. Myles Dillon commented in Révue Celtique XLVIII (1931) that "...she was especially suited for work which was necessarily teamwork and which gave her plenty of opportunity for helping others". Her name appears on fascicle G of the dictionary, which was published in 1955.

In the 1911 Census, she described her occupation as "Professor of French, and engaged in Research work". She did work cataloguing the manuscripts of the Royal Irish Academy and edited an edition of Táin bó Fraích with Myles Dillon that was published in 1933. At the time of her death, she was working on Togail Troí, a 10th-century Irish version of The Destruction of Troy.

== Death and legacy ==
She died on 31 January 1931 at 124 Lower Baggot Street, Dublin. According to An Claidheamh Soluis, she was struck by a bout of illness in August while she was in London lecturing at the Celtic Congress about women in Brehon law. She is buried in Glasnevin Cemetery. University College, Dublin, established "The Mary Byrne Medal for Early Irish Studies" in her memory.

Her essays and translations appeared in Révue Celtique, Ériu, Irish Monthly, Anecdota from Irish Manuscripts and the Journal of Theological Studies. Her translation of the Early Middle Irish lorica Rob tu mo bhoile (“May you be my vision”) was the basis for Eleanor Hull’s English hymn Be thou my vision.
