= Brian Rice =

Brian Rice may refer to:

- Brian Rice (footballer) (born 1963), Scottish football player and coach
- Brian Rice (artist) (born 1936), British abstract artist
- Brian W. Rice, American police officer
