= Arthur Knyvett-Lee =

- Born: Arthur Knyvett Lee; 6 June 1887
- Died: 1974 (aged 86–87)
- Occupation: art gallery owner
- Known for: co-founder, The Redfern Gallery
- Parent(s): Frederic Hugh Lee; Florence Lee

Arthur Knyvett-Lee (6 June 1887 - 1974) was a British art gallery owner, the co-founder of The Redfern Gallery.

Knyvett-Lee was born on 6 June 1887. He was the son of Frederic Hugh Lee, a solicitor and early England rugby union international, and his wife Florence Lee.

He served in the British Army during the First World War, rising to the rank of captain, with the Somerset Light Infantry.

In 1923, Knyvett-Lee co-founded The Redfern Gallery with Anthony Maxtone Graham on the top floor of Redfern House, 27 Old Bond Street, London, as an artists' cooperative.

He died in 1974.
