= The Miniver Story =

1950 film

- Theatrical release poster
- Directed by: H.C. Potter
- Screenplay by: George Froeschel; Ronald Millar
- Based on: Characters in Mrs. Miniver 1940 novel by Jan Struther
- Produced by: Sidney Franklin
- Starring: Greer Garson; Walter Pidgeon; John Hodiak; Leo Genn; Cathy O'Donnell; Reginald Owen; Henry Wilcoxon
- Cinematography: Joseph Ruttenberg
- Edited by: Frank Clarke; Harold F. Kress
- Music by: Miklós Rózsa; Herbert Stothart
- Production companies: Metro-Goldwyn-Mayer, MGM-British Studios
- Distributed by: Loew's, Inc.
- Release dates: October 26, 1950 (New York); November 10, 1950 (Los Angeles)
- Running time: 104 minutes
- Countries: United States, United Kingdom
- Language: English
- Budget: $3.66 million
- Box office: $2.22 million

The Miniver Story is a 1950 MGM-British Studios drama film starring Greer Garson and Walter Pidgeon that is the sequel to the 1942 film Mrs. Miniver. It was directed by H.C. Potter and produced by Sidney Franklin, with its screenplay written by George Froeschel and Ronald Millar based on characters created by Jan Struther. The music score was composed by Miklós Rózsa and Herbert Stothart, with additional uncredited music by Daniele Amfitheatrof, and the cinematographer was Joseph Ruttenberg. Garson, Pidgeon, Reginald Owen and Henry Wilcoxon return in their original roles from Mrs. Miniver.

== Plot ==
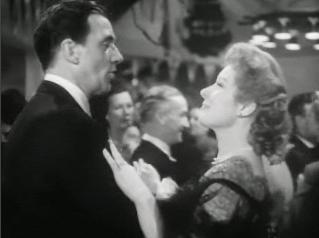
Walter Pidgeon and Greer Garson

At the conclusion of the war in Europe, Clem and Judy return home from service and Toby returns from a foster family in the United States. No mention is made of the oldest son, Vin; however, an early treatment reveals that he died fighting in the Battle of Britain, five years earlier.

Tom Foley, a captain in the Royal Engineers, loves corporal driver Judy, but she is smitten with commander Steve Brunswick, who is married but separated and twice her age. Kay Miniver has also become friendly with American colonel Spike.

Clem, restless and dissatisfied, is offered a design contract in Brazil. However, he does not know that Kay has developed a serious heart condition and has no longer than one year to live. Kay visits Brunswick and tells him about Judy’s quiet demeanor, which leads Brunswick to realize he wants to stay with his wife. Judy is heartbroken, but quickly recovers with Tom at the Sailing Club Dance, where Clem announces he’s decided to stay in London and offers Tom a job. Also during the SC Dance, Kay tells Clem she doesn’t have long to live. He is in shock, they dance in silence, looking at each other.

Judy marries Tom at church, then there’s a reception at the Miniver home. When the guests have all gone, Kay walks upstairs, saying she’ll be down in a moment but seems aware that it is her time. She dies at home on Judy’s wedding day.

== Cast ==
- Greer Garson as Kay Miniver
- Walter Pidgeon as Clem Miniver
- John Hodiak as Spike Romway
- Leo Genn as Steve Brunswick
- Cathy O'Donnell as Judy Miniver
- Reginald Owen as Mr. Foley
- Anthony Bushell as Dr. Kaneslaey
- Richard Gale as Tom Foley
- Peter Finch as Polish officer
- James Fox as Toby Miniver (as William Fox)

== Production ==
Cinematographer Joseph Ruttenberg was almost dismissed from the project because of British film-union regulations, but he was kept after Greer Garson threatened to quit the production.

Composer Miklós Rózsa was responsible for the musical scoring, using Herbert Stothart's thematic material from the original film. Stothart, M-G-M's leading composer for decades, had died in 1949. Muir Mathieson conducted in England.

No mention is made of the eldest Miniver son, Vincent, who was portrayed by Richard Ney in the earlier film. Garson and Ney had been married and divorced during the time between the two films.

== Reception ==
=== Critical ===
In a contemporary review for The New York Times, critic Bosley Crowther wrote:

[I]t takes Mrs. Miniver such an all-powerful long time to die that one suspects that this extension of the picture was the scriptwriter's primary aim. Certainly the prefatory problems are of such minor consequence—are so petty when compared to the problems and the theme of survival in the first film—that they look to be nothing more than fillers to make a story before the long death march. The poignancy of Mrs. Miniver's passing with the tall leaves is the motif of this film. This is too thin, and Miss Garson plays with such lofty humbleness that whatever emotion is in the story is drenched in great waves of obvious goo. So soft and beatific is her manner, so hushed and remote is her tone, that she seems, even before her passing, to have assumed her imminent state in another world.

Critic Edwin Schallert of the Los Angeles Times wrote: "Whether 'The Miniver Story' is deemed an important contribution to the screen, there is little question that it merits an accolade for the taste and sensitiveness that dignify it. The narration particularly at the end sustains this mode and is well recited by Pidgeon. Undoubtedly Its sentimentalism will be derided in some quarters. Simultaneously, many people will be moved by its sadness, which is deep-rooted."

=== Box office ===
According to MGM records, the film earned $990,000 in the U.S. and Canada and $1.23 million in other countries. However, this was not enough to recover the large budget of more than $3 million, and the film recorded a loss of $2.3 million, making it MGM's most costly flop of 1950.
