= The Redfern Gallery =

Redfern Gallery
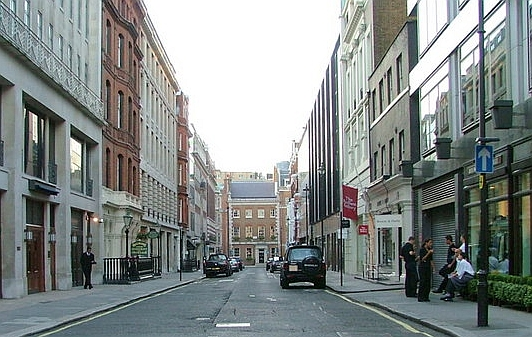
- View of Cork Street, with the Redfern on the right
- Formation: 1923
- Type: Art gallery
- Location: London, W1
- Coordinates: 51.51013°N 0.14117°W
- Founded by: Arthur Knyvett-Lee; Anthony Maxtone Graham
- Website: redfern-gallery.com

The Redfern Gallery is an exhibition space in the West End of London specialising in contemporary British art. It was founded by Arthur Knyvett-Lee and Anthony Maxtone Graham in 1923 as an artists' cooperative on the top floor of Redfern House, 27 Old Bond Street, and in 1936 moved to nearby 20 Cork Street.

== Exhibitions ==
In 1924 it showed the student work of Henry Moore and Barbara Hepworth, and in 1929, the first exhibition of British linocuts featuring work by Cyril Edward Power, Sybil Andrews, and Claude Flight. It showed many artists associated with Roger Fry's Omega Workshops, the later The London Group and members of the Bloomsbury School.

In 1963, The Redfern was the first gallery to show the work of Patrick Procktor. Sixteen more solo exhibitions of Proctor's works were to follow until 2017.

=== Recent exhibitions ===
In early 2014, the gallery held a retrospective of British pop art artist Brian Rice. In 2015–2016 it showed work by Sarah Armstrong-Jones.
