= Ray Bradley =

Ray Bradley may refer to:

- Raymond S. Bradley, climatologist
- Ray Bradley (artist), British artist, designer and lecturer
