= Be Thou My Vision =

Christian hymn

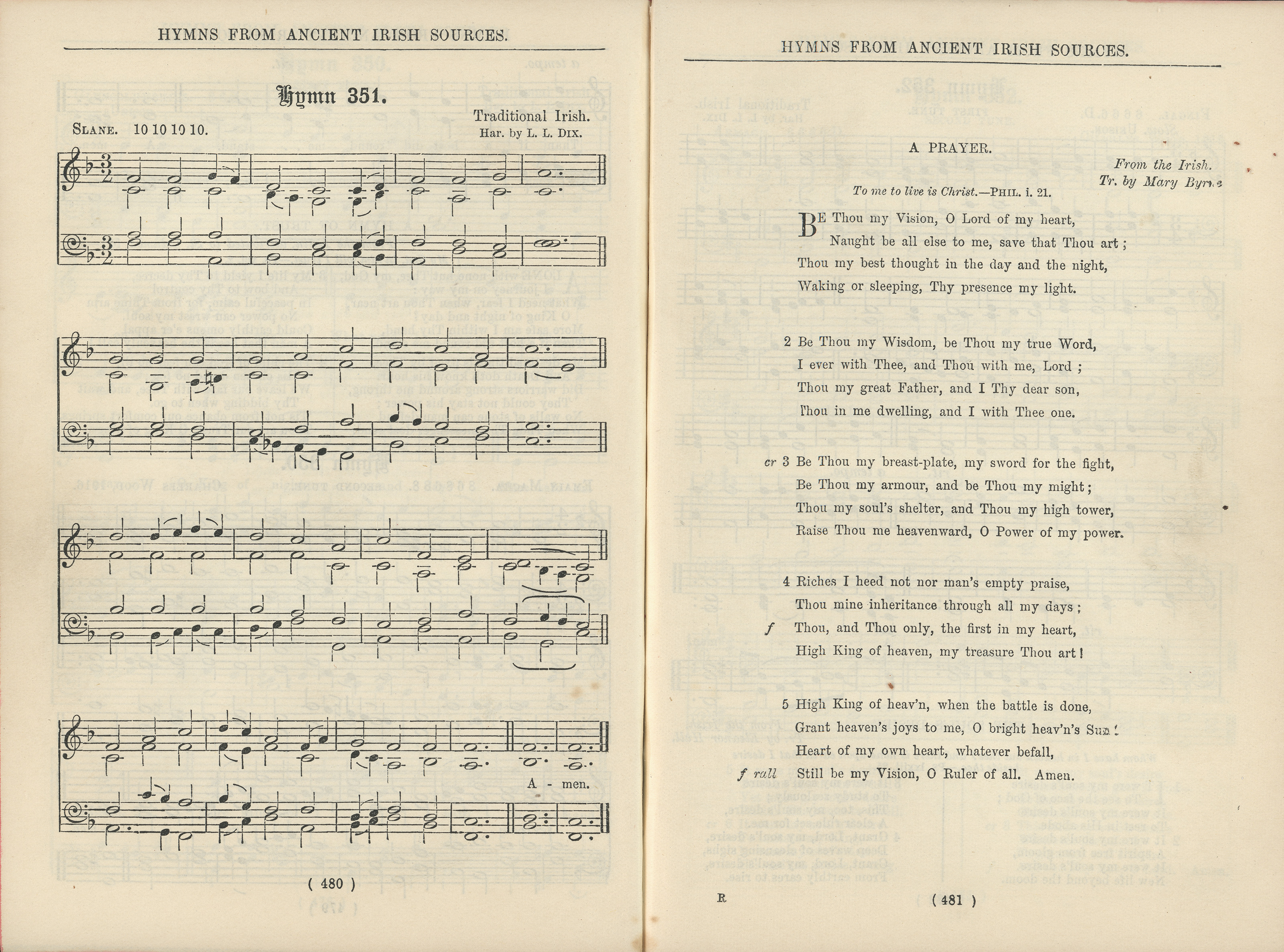
- Native name: Rop tú mo baile; Rob tu mo bhoile
- Genre: Hymn
- Text: Author unknown, attr. St. Dallán Forgaill; trans. Mary Elizabeth Byrne, Eleanor Hull
- Meter: 10.10.10.10
- Melody: Slane (trad. Irish)
- Published: 10th or 11th century (trans. 1912)
- Translations into English, Modern Irish and Scottish Gaelic

"Be Thou My Vision" (Old Irish: Rop tú mo baile or Rob tú mo bhoile) is a traditional Christian hymn of Irish origin. The words are based on a Middle Irish lorica that has sometimes been attributed to Dallán Forgaill.

The best-known English version, with some minor variations, was translated in 1905 by Mary Elizabeth Byrne, then made into verse by Eleanor Hull and published in 1912. Since 1919 it has been commonly sung to an Irish folk tune, noted as "Slane" in church hymnals, and is one of the most popular hymns in the United Kingdom.

== Text ==
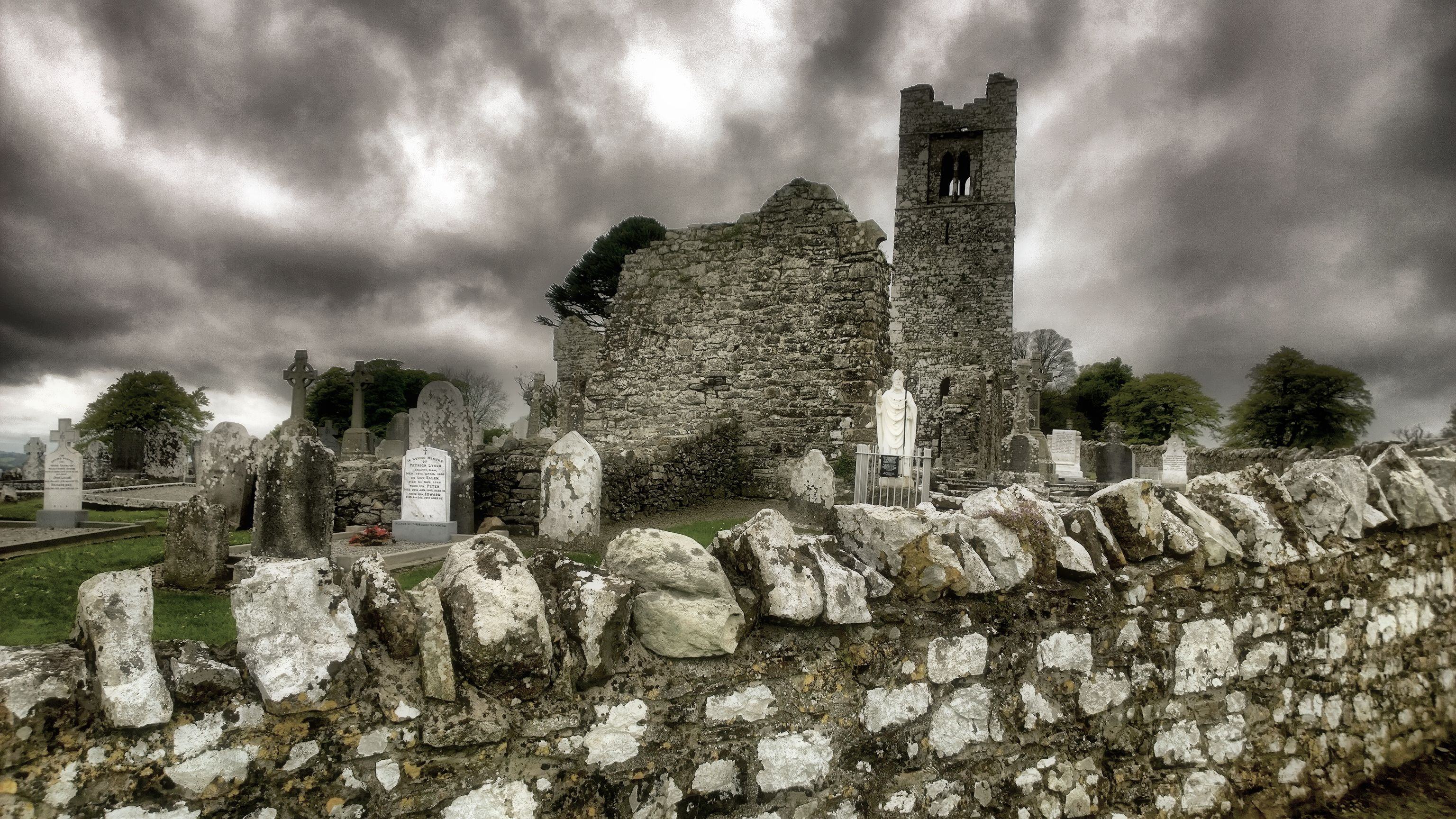
Church ruins on Slane Hill

The original Early Middle Irish text, "Rop tú mo baile" is attributed to Saint Dallán Forgaill in the 6th century. However, scholars believe it was written much later than that. Gerard Murphy follows Monica Nevin in dating it to "the end of the tenth century or in the eleventh century" based on the language used.

There are two manuscript sources for the prayer, National Library of Ireland MS. 3 (f. 22r), which Murphy calls P, and R.I.A. MS. 23 N 10 (pp. 95–96), which Murphy calls N. Murphy attributes N to the sixteenth-century (one of the scribes refers to the Saturday before St. Patrick’s Day 1575) and P "may also have been written in the sixteenth century, or perhaps a century of so earlier". Manuscript P has been attributed to Ádhamh Ó Cianáin which would suggest a 14th century origin, but parts of the manuscript, including this prayer, are in different handwriting.

Mary Elizabeth Byrne’s 1905 edition and translation in Ériu used Manuscript N (RIA MS 23 N 10), referring to Manuscript P as "evidently only a careless transcript of [Manuscript N]", though she gave no justification for this claim. Mrs. Monica Nevin also published an edition and translation of Manuscript P (NLI MS 3) in the journal Éigse in 1940.

Byrne’s English translation was first versified by Eleanor Hull, co-founder of the Irish Texts Society, and published under the title "A Prayer" in The Poem-Book of the Gael in 1912. This is now the most common text used.

The text of Rop tú mo Baile reflects aspects of life in Early Christian Ireland (c.400-800 AD). The prayer belongs to a type known as a lorica, a prayer for protection. The symbolic use of a battle-shield and a sword to invoke the power and protection of God draws on Saint Paul's Epistle to the Ephesians (Ephesians 6:16–17), which refers to "the shield of faith" and "the sword of the Spirit". Such military symbolism was common in the poetry and hymnology of Christian monasteries of the period due to the prevalence of clan warfare across Ireland. The poem makes reference to God as "King of the Seven Heavens" and the "High King of Heaven". This depiction of the Lord God of heaven and earth as a chieftain or High King (Irish: Ard Rí) is a traditional representation in Irish literature; medieval Irish poetry typically used heroic imagery to cast God as a clan protector.

== Musical accompaniment ==
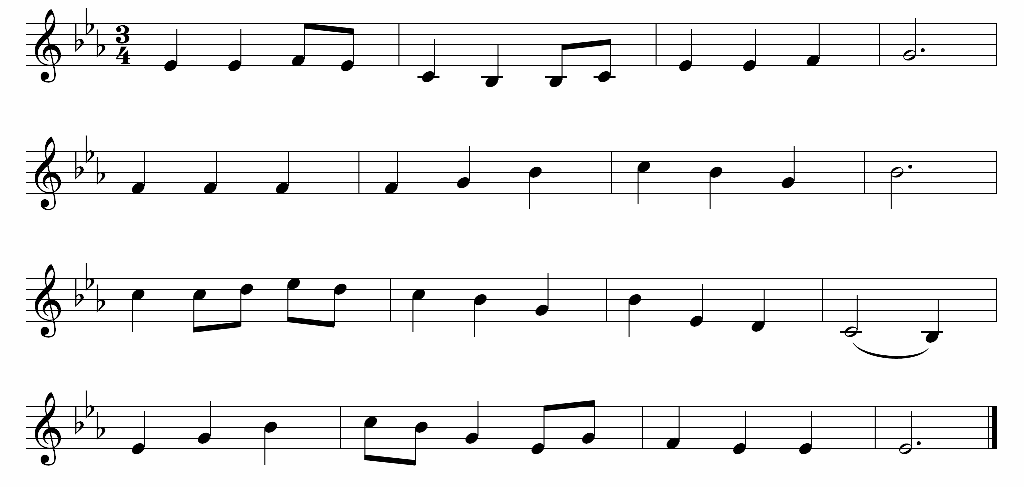
The melody "Slane"

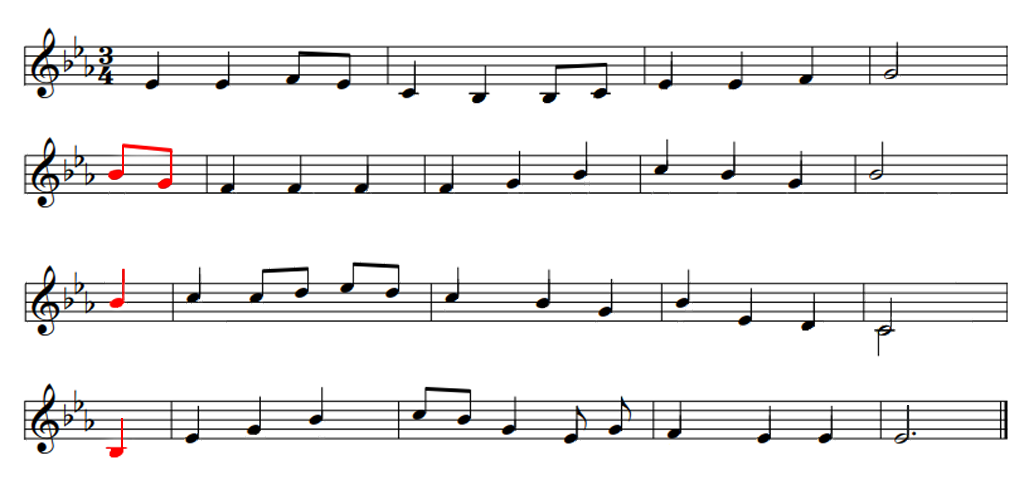
The alternative version of "Slane" (upbeats highlighted in red)

The hymn is sung to the melody noted as “Slane” in hymnals, an Irish folk tune in 3/4 time, first published as "With My Love on the Road" in Patrick Joyce's Old Irish Folk Music and Songs in 1909. The tune is a more elemental distillation of earlier forms, such as "The Hielan's o' Scotland' and "By the Banks of the Bann," also compiled in Joyce (1909). The words of "Be Thou My Vision" were first combined with this tune in 1919 (harmonised by Leopold L Dix, 1861-1935), and in a new version harmonised by David Evans in 1927. A further version was harmonised by Erik Routley in 1951 for Congregational Praise.

It was common practice to attribute hymn tune names to the place where they were collected by folk song collectors, such as Ralph Vaughan Williams who co-edited The English Hymnal, published in 1906. Slane is a village in Ireland.

Four more 20th century hymns have been set to the same tune. The first was "Lord of All Hopefulness" written by Jan Struther around 1931. The second was "Lord of Creation, to Thee be All Praise" written by J. C. Winslow and first published in 1961. The third was a popular wedding hymn, "God, In the Planning and Purpose of Life", written by John L. Bell and Graham Maule and first appearing in publication in 1989. The fourth is "Wake Now My Senses," written by Thomas Michaelson and published in "Singing the Living Tradition Hymnal" 1994, by the Unitarian Universalist Association.

Gå inte förbi ("Don't Walk Past") is a duet-single set to the tune, recorded by Swedish singer Peter Jöback and Norwegian singer Sissel Kyrkjebø and written by Ulf Schagerman. Jöback sings the lyrics in Swedish while Sissel sings in Norwegian. It was released as a single in 2003 and at an extended reissue of Jöback's Christmas album Jag kommer hem igen till jul. It was a hit in Norway and Sweden in the Christmas time of 2003 and a music video directed by Mikadelica was made in Denmark. Norwegian newspaper VG gave it 4 out of 6.

== Lyrics ==
"Rop Tú mo Baile"
Selected verses of "Be thou my vision" sung in Old Irish to the musical composition, "Slane"

The original texts of Rop Tú Mo Ḃaile are in Early Middle Irish. The hymn has been translated into Modern Irish many times. The most popular is that by Aodh Ó Dúgain of Gaoth Dobhair, County Donegal. Two verses of his translation were recorded by his granddaughter Máire Ní Bhraonáin – the first time any part of his text has been publicly recorded. Since then, those two verses have been recorded by many artists, including Roma Downey and Aoife and Iona. These verses are paraphrases of the English text and do not closely follow the original Gaelic.

The song has also been translated into Scottish Gaelic by Céitidh Mhoireasdan and published by Sabhal Mòr Ostaig.

Two variants of Eleanor Hull's 1912 English translation exist; one version, commonly used in Irish and Scottish hymnals (including the Hymnbooks of the Church of Scotland), fits the metre 10.10.10.10, while a paraphrased version that is used in English books (such as the New English Hymnal) is suitable to an anacrucial metre 10.11.11.11.

=== Original Old Irish Text ===
Rop tú mo baile, a Choimdiu cride:
ní ní nech aile acht Rí secht nime.

Rop tú mo scrútain i lló 's i n-aidche;
rop tú ad-chëar im chotlud caidche.

Rop tú mo labra, rop tú mo thuicsiu;
rop tussu dam-sa, rob misse duit-siu.

Rop tussu m'athair, rob mé do mac-su;
rop tussu lem-sa, rob misse lat-su.

Rop tú mo chathscíath, rop tú mo chlaideb;
rop tussu m'ordan, rop tussu m'airer.

Rop tú mo dítiu, rop tú mo daingen;
rop tú nom-thocba i n-áentaid n-aingel.

Rop tú cech maithius dom churp, dom anmain;
rop tú mo flaithius i nnim 's i talmain.

Rop tussu t'áenur sainṡerc mo chride;
ní rop nech aile acht Airdrí nime.

Co talla forum, ré ndul it láma,
mo chuit, mo chotlud, ar méit do gráda.

Rop tussu t'áenur m'urrann úais amra:
ní chuinngim daíne ná maíne marba.

Rop amlaid dínsiur cech sel, cech sáegul,
mar marb oc brénad, ar t'ḟégad t'áenur.

Do ṡerc im anmain, do grád im chride,
tabair dam amlaid, a Rí secht nime.

Tabair dam amlaid, a Rí secht nime,
do ṡerc im anmain, do grád im chride.

Go Ríg na n-uile rís íar mbúaid léire;
ro béo i flaith nime i ngile gréine

A Athair inmain, cluinte mo núall-sa:
mithig (mo-núarán!) lasin trúagán trúag-sa.

A Chríst (Note: Some sources have "cride" instead of "Chríst".) mo chride, cip ed dom-aire,
a Flaith na n-uile, rop tú mo baile.

=== English translation by Mary Byrne (1905) ===
Be thou my vision O Lord of my heart
None other is aught but the King of the seven heavens.

Be thou my meditation by day and night.
May it be thou that I behold ever in my sleep.

Be thou my speech, be thou my understanding.
Be thou with me, be I with thee

Be thou my father, be I thy son.
Mayst thou be mine, may I be thine.

Be thou my battle-shield, be thou my sword.
Be thou my dignity, be thou my delight.

Be thou my shelter, be thou my stronghold.
Mayst thou raise me up to the company of the angels.

Be thou every good to my body and soul.
Be thou my kingdom in heaven and on earth.

Be thou solely chief love of my heart.
Let there be none other, O high King of Heaven.

Till I am able to pass into thy hands,
My treasure, my beloved through the greatness of thy love

Be thou alone my noble and wondrous estate.
I seek not men nor lifeless wealth.

Be thou the constant guardian of every possession and every life.
For our corrupt desires are dead at the mere sight of thee.

Thy love in my soul and in my heart —
Grant this to me, O King of the seven heavens.

O King of the seven heavens grant me this —
Thy love to be in my heart and in my soul.

With the King of all, with him after victory won by piety,
May I be in the kingdom of heaven, O brightness of the sun.

Beloved Father, hear, hear my lamentations.
Timely is the cry of woe of this miserable wretch.

O heart of my heart, whatever befall me,
O ruler of all, be thou my vision.

=== Aodh Ó Dúgáin’s modern Irish translation ===
Bí Thusa ’mo shúile a Rí mhóir na ndúl
Líon thusa mo bheatha mo chéadfaí ’s mo stuaim
Bí thusa i m'aigne gach oíche ’s gach lá
Im chodladh nó im dhúiseacht, líon mé le do ghrá.

Bí thusa ’mo threorú i mbriathar ’s i mbeart
Fan thusa go deo liom is coinnigh mé ceart
Glac cúram mar Athair, is éist le mo ghuí
Is tabhair domsa áit cónaí istigh i do chroí.

=== English version by Eleanor Hull (1912) ===
Be Thou my Vision, O Lord of my heart;
Naught be all else to me, save that Thou art.
Thou my best Thought, by day or by night,
Waking or sleeping, Thy presence my light.

Be Thou my Wisdom, and Thou my true Word;
I ever with Thee and Thou with me, Lord;
Thou my great Father, I Thy true son;
Thou in me dwelling, and I with Thee one.

Be Thou my battle Shield, Sword for the fight;
Be Thou my Dignity, Thou my Delight;
Thou my soul’s Shelter, Thou my high Tow’r:
Raise Thou me heav’nward, O Pow’r of my pow’r.

Riches I heed not, nor man’s empty praise,
Thou mine Inheritance, now and always:
Thou and Thou only, first in my heart,
High King of Heaven, my Treasure Thou art.

High King of Heaven, my victory won,
May I reach Heaven’s joys, O bright Heav’n’s Sun!
Heart of my own heart, whatever befall,
Still be my Vision, O Ruler of all.

(The English Methodist version from 1964 omits verse 3.)

=== Alternative English version by Eleanor Hull (1912) ===
Be Thou my Vision, O Lord of my heart;
Be all else but naught to me, save that Thou art;
Be Thou my best thought in the day and the night,
Both waking and sleeping, Thy presence my light.

Be Thou my Wisdom, and Thou my true Word;
Be Thou ever with me, and I with Thee, Lord;
Be Thou my great Father, and I Thy true son;
Be Thou in me dwelling, and I with Thee one.

Be Thou my Breastplate, my Sword for the fight;
Be Thou my whole Armour, be Thou my true Might;
Be Thou my soul's Shelter, be Thou my strong Tow’r,
O raise Thou me heav’nward, great Pow’r of my pow’r.

Riches I heed not, nor man's empty praise;
Be Thou mine inheritance, now and always;
Be Thou and Thou only the first in my heart,
O high King of heaven, my Treasure Thou art.

High King of heaven, Thou heaven's bright Sun,
O grant me its joys, after vict'ry is won;
Great Heart of my own heart, whatever befall,
Still be Thou my vision, O Ruler of all.

=== Modern Scottish Gaelic translation by Céitidh Mhoireasdan ===
Dèan dhòmh-sa tuigse,
Cuir soills’ air mo smuain;
Dh’iarrainn gur Tu
Bhiodh ’gam stiùreadh gach uair;
Làmh rium ’s an oidhche
Is romham ’s an tràth,
Réidh rium ’sa mhadainn
Agus glèidh mi tro’n latha.

Ceartas do m’ bhriathran
Agus fìrinn do m’ bheul,
Thusa toirt iùil dhomh
’S mi dlùth riut, a Dhè.
Athair, thoir gràdh dhomh,
Gabh mis’ thugad fhéin;
Cum mi ri d’ thaobh
Is bi daonnan ’nam chrè.

Dìon mi, a Thighearna,
Ri mo chliathaich ’s gach feachd;
Cùm mi fo d’ sgiath
’S thoir dhomh misneachd is neart,
Fasgadh do m’ anam
Is mi ri d’uchd dlùth;
Treòraich mi dhachaigh,
Dhè chumhachdaich Thu.

Beartas cha’n fhiach leam;
No miann chlann ’nan daoin’,
Thusa na m’ fhianais
Fad làithean mo shaogh’il
Thusa, Dhè ghràsmhoir,
A-mhàin na mo chrìdh’,
Le blàths is gràdh sìorraidh,
Mo Thighearna ’s mo Rìgh.

== See also ==
- Saint Patrick's Breastplate
- Lord of All Hopefulness, a hymn sung to the same tune
