= Labby =

Labby may refer to

- Sherman Labby (1929–1998), American storyboard artist and production illustrator
- Labby, County Londonderry, a townland in County Londonderry, Northern Ireland
- Labrador Retriever, a breed of dog nicknamed "Labby"
- Jason "Labrat" Hawkins, Australian radio presenter
- Henry Labouchère (1831–1912), English politician, writer, publisher and theatre owner
