= Frederic Hugh Lee =

- Born: 14 September 1855 Westminster, London, England
- Died: 6 February 1924 (aged 68) Aberdeen, Scotland
- School: Marlborough College
- University: Trinity College, Oxford
- Occupation(s): Solicitor; ecclesiastical lawyer

Rugby union career
- Position: Forward
Amateur team(s)
Years	Team	Apps	(Points)
–	Oxford University		
International career
Years	Team	Apps	(Points)
1876–1877	England	2	(0)

Frederic Hugh Lee (14 September 1855 – 6 February 1924) was an English international rugby union forward and later an ecclesiastical lawyer. He represented England in 1876 and 1877 and was regarded as one of the finest “follower-up” forwards of his generation. He later served as Registrar of the Court of Arches and Principal Registrar of the Province of Canterbury.

== Early life and education ==
Lee was born in Westminster, London, the son of John Benjamin Lee (1811–1889), senior partner in the ecclesiastical law firm Lee, Bolton & Lee, of 1 The Sanctuary, Westminster, and 5 Deans Court, Doctors’ Commons. His mother was Amelia Bridget Knyvett (1811–1901).

He was educated at Marlborough College, where he distinguished himself in sport. In 1873 he represented the school in racquets in connection with the Public Schools Racquets Championship and captained the cricket XI.

Lee matriculated at Trinity College, Oxford on 19 October 1874, aged 19, and graduated B.A. in 1877.

== Rugby career ==
=== Oxford University ===
Lee played for Oxford University and won his Blue. He captained the University XV in the 1876–77 season. Contemporary rugby writing described him as perhaps the best “follower-up” of his day, noting his alert support play and stamina in broken-field situations.

=== England ===
Lee was selected for England in 1876 and again in 1877, earning two international caps as a forward. In one of his appearances against Scotland he backed up a “magnificent run” by a teammate and secured the try that won the match for England, an incident later cited as characteristic of his exceptional support play.

Marshall included Lee among the representative forwards of the period, praising his energy, stamina, and effectiveness in close play during the formative years of international rugby.

== Legal and ecclesiastical career ==
After leaving Oxford, Lee entered the family firm of Lee, Bolton & Lee, Westminster ecclesiastical solicitors, in partnership with his father and his elder brother, Harry Wilmot Lee.

By 1897 he was serving as Legal Secretary to the Bishop of London and promoted proceedings in the Probate Division in Lee v Hawtrey (1897), concerning ecclesiastical faculty jurisdiction and the removal of church fittings and remains.

In 1899 he was appointed Registrar of the Court of Arches, the senior ecclesiastical court of the Province of Canterbury. By 1914 he was described as Notary Public and Principal Registrar of the Province of Canterbury, participating in the legal confirmation of episcopal appointments, including that of the Bishop of Bristol.

== Marriage and family ==
On 12 January 1882 Lee married Florence Andrew, third daughter of Charles Andrew, J.P., of Coughton Court, Warwickshire.

The couple had three children:

- Hugh Ashton Lee (1882–1882)
- Bridget Ashton Lee (1886–1886)
- Arthur Knyvett Lee (1887–1974)

== Later life and death ==
Lee maintained professional chambers at 1 The Sanctuary, Westminster. He died on 6 February 1924 at Albyn Place, Aberdeen.
