= Vale Special =

Overview
- Manufacturer: Vale Engineering Company
- Production: 1932-1935 approx 100 made
- Designer: P. I. E. Pellew (chief); S. F. Mortimer (assistant)

Body and chassis
- Body style: two-seat tourer four-seat tourer (Tourette)

Powertrain
- Engine: Triumph 832 ccI4; Coventry Climax 1098 cc I4; Coventry Climax 1476 cc I6
- Transmission: 4-speed manual

Dimensions
- Wheelbase: 84 or 102 inches (2134 or 2590 mm
- Length: 132 inches (3352 mm)
- Width: 55 inches (1397 mm)

Chronology
- Predecessor: none
- Successor: none

The Vale Special (sometimes just Vale) was a British sports car made between 1932 and 1935 in Maida Vale, London.

== History ==
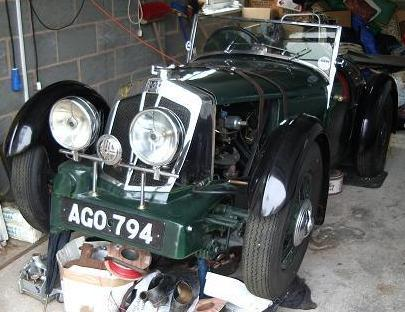
A Vale Special, previously belonging to Allan Gaspar, in the process of being restored by Dave Cox in 2005.

The Vale Motor Company was established in 1931 by Pownoll Pellew (later 9th Viscount Exmouth) as a 'gentleman's hobby' in a rented workshop behind The Warrington pub in Maida Vale. The project was initially funded by Pellew (helped by his mother and his actress girlfriend Kay Walsh) and his two business partners Allan Gaspar (with help from his bank manager father), and Robert Owen Wilcoxon (thanks to early film proceeds of his film actor brother Henry Wilcoxon). It was Henry who designed the striking Vale Motor Co. badge.

The cars were initially handmade and based on Triumph Motor Company components. What made the car 'special' was its low-slung chassis, considered a remedy to the poor road-holding of small sports cars. The first cars used the 832 cc side-valve engine from the Triumph Super 7 fitted to an 84-inch wheelbase chassis bought in from Rubery Owen, semi-elliptic leaf springs all round, and the hydraulic brakes and axles from the Triumph. The top speed was only 65 mph (105 km/h), which was too slow for serious sporting events: so from 1933 a 1098 cc, overhead-inlet, side-exhaust, four-cylinder, Coventry Climax engine was offered, followed in 1934 by the 1476 cc six-cylinder version of the same engine.

Most of the cars had lightweight two-seater open bodies with fold-flat windscreens, but a four-seat version on a long-wheelbase chassis, called the 'Tourette', was available with the larger-engined versions.

In 1933 a new model, the Vale 'Vixen', was proposed with a larger engine size, longer 102 inch wheelbase on a stronger chassis, a redesigned steering system and other improvements. The blueprint exists, but a complete car was never built.

Around 55-60 cars had been built by the company when production stopped in 1935, though some have suggested that there were more, up to 80.

== See also ==
- List of car manufacturers of the United Kingdom
