= The President's Mystery =

1936 film by Phil Rosen

- Directed by: Phil Rosen
- Written by: Franklin Delano Roosevelt; Samuel Hopkins Adams; Lester Cole; John Erskine; Rupert Hughes; Fulton Oursler; S.S. Van Dine; Rita Weiman; Nathanael West
- Produced by: Burt Kelly; Nat Levine; Albert E. Levoy
- Starring: Henry Wilcoxon; Betty Furness; Sidney Blackmer; Evelyn Brent
- Cinematography: Ernest Miller
- Edited by: Robert L. Simpson
- Music by: Hugo Riesenfeld
- Production company: Republic Pictures
- Distributed by: Republic Pictures
- Release date: September 28, 1936
- Running time: 80 minutes
- Country: United States
- Language: English

The President's Mystery is a 1936 American mystery film directed by Phil Rosen and starring Henry Wilcoxon, Betty Furness, Sidney Blackmer and Evelyn Brent. It was based on a novel inspired by an outline by the sitting President Franklin Delano Roosevelt, with all proceeds of both the book and film going to the Georgia Warm Springs Foundation. It was produced and distributed by Republic Pictures. The film was released under the alternative title One for All in the United Kingdom by British Lion Films.

== Plot summary ==
The film deals with a "problem Mr. Roosevelt submitted . . . whether it was possible for a man, weary of faithless friends and a wasted life, to convert a $5,000,000 estate into cash, disappear and start anew in some worth-while activity." (cited from The New York Times – Monday, April 16, 2012)

Disillusioned attorney James Blake is engaged by his friend George Sartos to lobby on behalf of the National Cannery against a bill that would've empowered smaller businesses. After James is successful, he encounters Charlotte Brown, who runs a cannery that is the main livelihood of the small town of Springvale; the cannery has been forced to close because of the bill. James listens to the townsfolk and is inspired to help them.

James liquidates his assets, closes his bank accounts, and stages a failed business venture to make it seem that he's gone bankrupt. Once ready, he leaves his estranged wife, Ilka, to fake his death in a car accident. Ilka tries to inform George, who is also her lover, about James's strange behavior but is accidentally killed by George's manservant, Andrew. James learns about Ilka's death through the radio, and how James is blamed for it but the case is considered closed since his "body" was found by the police.

Some months later James, using his new name James Carter, is in a relationship with Charlotte and has turned her cannery into a success. They are visited by George, who wants to buy out their business. George recognizes James and tries to blackmail him into compliance. When James refuses, George informs the police and James is arrested for Ilka's murder.

While James is held in the town jail, George plants agents provocateurs to cause a riot to destroy the cannery. James learns of this and, due to his good relationship with the people of Springvale, is allowed out of the town jail to talk the rioters down and bring proof of his intentions to keep the cannery going. Meanwhile, James's former manservant Roger, acting on his own initiative, finds out from Andrew that Ilka's death was an accident. George is arrested for causing the riot, and James is released, freeing him to marry Charlotte.

== Cast ==
- Henry Wilcoxon as James Blake
- Betty Furness as Charlotte Brown
- Sidney Blackmer as George Sartos
- Evelyn Brent as Ilka Blake
- Barnett Parker as Roger
- Mel Ruick as Andrew
- Wade Boteler as Floyd, the Sheriff
- John Wray as Shane
- Guy Usher as Police Lieutenant
- Robert Homans as Sergeant
- Si Jenks as Earl
- Arthur Aylesworth as Joe Reed
- Harry Antrim as Inspector A.R. Lahey

== Bibliography ==
- Menne, Jeff & Long, Christian B. Film and the American Presidency. Routledge, 2015.
- Neve, Brian. Film and Politics in America: A Social Tradition. Routledge, 2004.
