= Daniel A. Wehrschmidt =

German-American artist (1861–1932)

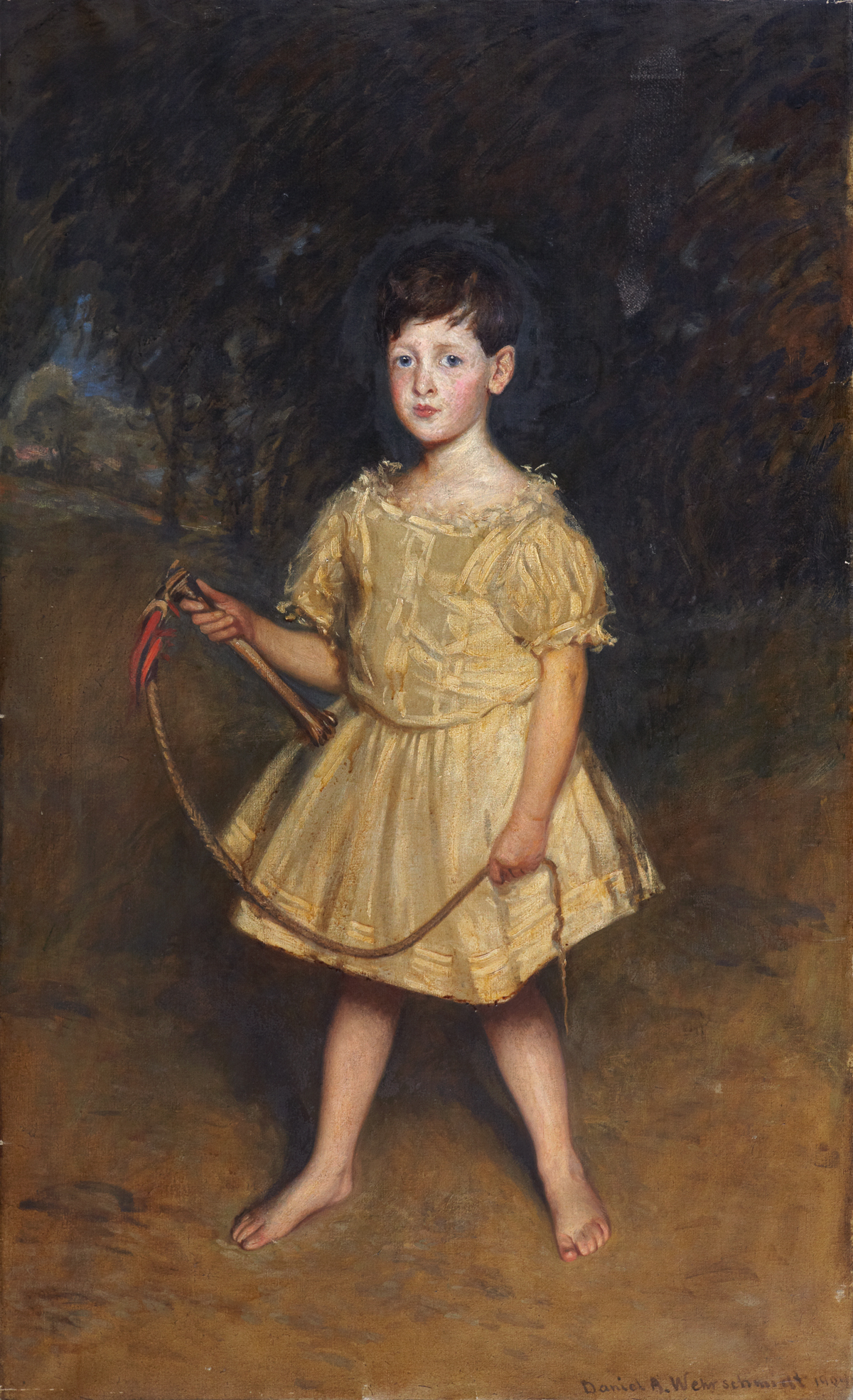
Anthony Maxtone Graham by Daniel A. Wehrschmidt. Oil on canvas, 1904.

Daniel Albert Wehrschmidt (1861 – 22 February 1932), also known as D. A. Veresmith, was a German-American artist from Ohio who made a career for himself in England as a portrait painter, lithographer, and engraver.

He exhibited ten paintings at the Royal Academy, London, between 1886 and 1893. His 1905 portrait of Robert Falcon Scott was accepted by the British government in lieu of tax in 2012 and allocated to the National Portrait Gallery, London.

Wehrschmidt is also noted for seven of twenty-five illustrations in Thomas Hardy's novel Tess of the d'Urbervilles.

His work is in the permanent collections of The London National Liberal Club (- Granville George Leveson Gower 2nd Earl Granville and Charles Robert Wynn Carrington first Marquess of Lincolnshire) - The Scottish National Portrait Gallery - (William Sharp) - The Edinburgh City Council Art Center - (Anthony J. O. Maxtone Graham (1900–1971) the 16th Laird of Culloquhey and 9th Laird of Redgorton and the co-founder of The Redfern Gallery in London in 1923) and The Bushey Museum and Art Gallery (A Foundryman).

Daniel Wehrschmidt was born in Cuyahoga County near Cleveland, Ohio, USA in 1861, the son of a German immigrant tailor. He was active in Cleveland's art scene and by the age of eighteen, had already exhibited his works locally. In 1882, he met Hubert von Herkomer, who was having a ten week tour of the United States. He was a prominent member of the Royal Academy, Royal Watercolour Society, and the Royal Engravers, and was the author of Etchings and Mezzotint Engraving, published in 1892, and of an autobiography, My School and my Gospel, 1907.

Herkomer was impressed by Wehrschmidt and invited him to join him in a new venture in England, which was a school to train illustrators and painters in Bushey, Hertfordshire.

Wehrschmidt took him up on the invitation and served as a teacher and eventually co-owner of the school where he remained until 1896, a year in which Von Herkomer was knighted by Queen Victoria.

At this time Wehrschmidt was living at Rose Cottage, Bushey. He was a portrait painter in oils; mezzotint artist, having created mezzotints for John Everett Millais); and an illustrator and engraver. He, along with Joseph Syddall (1864-1942), and Ernest Borough Johnson (1866-1949), produced the illustrations for Thomas Hardy's Tess of the D'Urbervilles. Wehrschmidt produced seven of the plates.

By 1891, Wehrschmidt had exhibited seven paintings, mostly portraits, although The Love Letter (1891) and Portrait of a Haymaker' revealed his interest in genre painting.

After 1904, when Herkomer closed the school at Bushey, he won numerous medals for his paintings and prints, in particular at the 1904 St. Louis Exhibition and at San Francisco's Panama Pacific Exhibition in 1915. He was elected a full Member of the Royal Society of Portrait Painters in 1915 and a Member of the International Society of Sculptors, Painters and Gravers.

He exhibited 39 paintings at the Royal Academy, 14 at the Walker in Liverpool, 12 at The Royal Society of Portrait Painters, 12 at the Glasgow Institute of Fine Arts, 17 at the Fine Art Society, 9 at the London Salon, and variously in the Provinces, as well as abroad. There are ten of his paintings in the National Collection.

He married his wife Marie Louise Isabel Norie, a descendant of Scottish painter James Norie 1684 - 1757, whom he met at the school in Bushey on 22 July 1890 at St. Mary's Cathedral Midlothian. She was also a student of Herkomer and an accomplished watercolorist and painter. She exhibited two landscape paintings at the Fine Art Society in 1892.

They had six children, of whom, two of his sons (twins) were killed in action in WWI. He became a naturalized British Subject in 1890, and due to the anti-German feeling common in Britain around the time of the first World War, Anglicised his name to Veresmith.

He is shown in the 1901 Census as living at 67 Burnt Ash Hill, Lee, London. He lived briefly in Co. Cork in Ireland around 1921, before moving to North Curry Somerset, where he had a studio and painted till he died on 22 February 1932. He is buried with family at St. Peter & Paul Church in North Curry.
