= Mrs. Miniver (character) =

Fictional British character created by Jan Struther in 1937

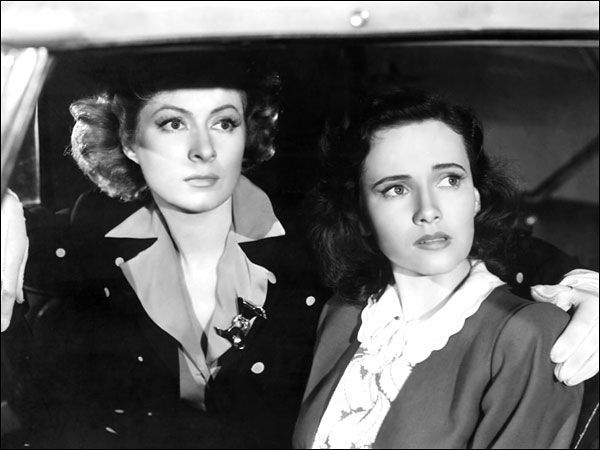
Mrs. Miniver (left, played by Greer Garson) and Carol Beldon (played by Teresa Wright)

Mrs. Miniver is a fictional British housewife created by Jan Struther in 1937 for a series of newspaper columns for The Times. The Mrs. Miniver story was later adapted into a film of the same name and starred Greer Garson in the titular role for which she won the Academy Award for Best Actress.

== Origin ==
In the 1930s, Jan Struther started to write for Punch magazine, and this brought her to the attention of The Times newspaper, where Peter Fleming asked her to write a series of columns for the paper, about "an ordinary sort of woman who leads an ordinary sort of life – rather like yourself". The resulting character that she created, Mrs. Kay Miniver, a British housewife living in Chelsea, proved a huge success from the character's inception in 1937, and the columns were subsequently published in book form in 1939. On the outbreak of war, this book became the basis for a patriotic and sentimental American film, Mrs. Miniver, released in 1942, which won six Academy Awards, including Best Picture.

The Times columns were short reflections on everyday life, based in part on Struther's own family and experiences. While the columns started as lighthearted domestic scenes where the outside world barely intruded, the approach of World War II slowly brought darker global concerns into Mrs. Miniver's world. One of the more memorable pieces appears near the middle of the series, where the Minivers get gas masks.

== Book publication ==
The columns were first published in book form in 1939, shortly after the outbreak of World War II. Struther stopped the regular newspaper columns that year, but wrote a series of letters from Mrs. Miniver, expanding on the character's wartime experiences. These were published in later editions.

The book became an enormous success, especially in the United States, where Struther went on a lecture tour shortly after the book's release.

The U.S. was still officially neutral, but as war with Nazi Germany intensified in Europe, the tribulations of the Miniver family engaged the sympathy of the American public sufficiently that President Franklin D. Roosevelt credited it for hastening America's involvement in the war. Winston Churchill is said to have claimed that it had done more for the Allied cause than a flotilla of battleships. Churchill is further quoted by Bernard Wasserstein in his book, "Barbarism and Civilization," as saying that the book (and later the film) was worth "six divisions of war effort."

In 1942, when the film came out, Roosevelt ordered it rushed to theaters.

== Adaptations ==
=== Film ===
The film adaptation of Mrs. Miniver was produced by MGM in 1942 with Greer Garson in the leading role and William Wyler directing. Under the influence of the American Office of War Information, the film attempted to undermine Hollywood's prewar depiction of Britain as a glamorous bastion of social privilege, anachronistic habits and snobbery in favour of more democratic, modern images. To this end, the social status enjoyed by the Miniver family in the print version was downgraded and increased attention was given to the erosion of class barriers under the pressures of wartime. In 1942, the film won an Oscar in the Best Picture category and both Greer Garson and Teresa Wright won an Oscar in the Best Actress and Best Supporting Actress categories, respectively. The film grossed $5,358,000 (equivalent to $83,362,466 in 2025) in North America (the highest for any MGM film at the time) and $3,520,000 abroad equivalent to $54,765,935 in 2025. In Britain, it was named the top box office attraction of 1942. 555 of the 592 film critics polled by American magazine Film Daily named it the best film of 1942.

A sequel to Mrs. Miniver, The Miniver Story was made by the same studio in 1950 with Greer Garson and Walter Pidgeon reprising their original roles. The characters were based on those in the original film, but their creator, Jan Struther, did not participate in the sequel.

=== Radio ===
In 1944, CBS Radio presented a Friday-night series named Mrs. Miniver starring Judith Evelyn and Karl Swenson. They were soon replaced by Gertrude Warner and John Moore. But the show only lasted 9 months.

=== Television ===
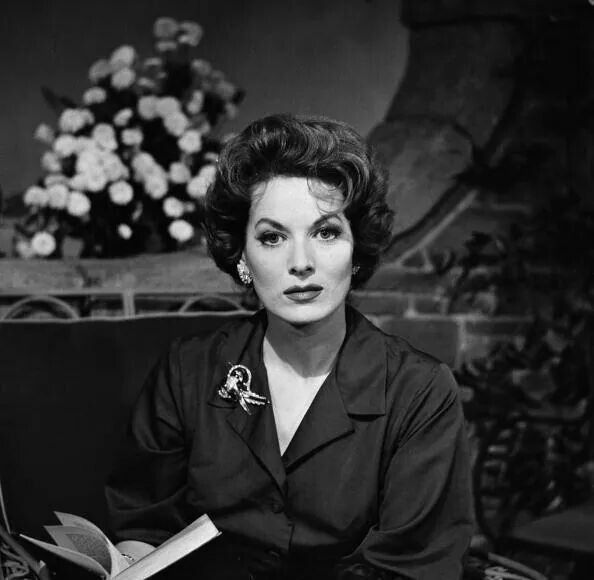
Maureen O'Hara as Kay Miniver in a 1960 television remake of Mrs Miniver

In 1960, CBS Television presented Mrs. Miniver starring Maureen O'Hara as Mrs Miniver, Leo Genn as Clem Miniver, Juliet Mills and Keir Dullea. The adaptation was by George Bart and was directed by Marc Daniels.

== See also ==
- Mrs. Miniver's problem
