= Mrs. Miniver =

1942 film by William Wyler

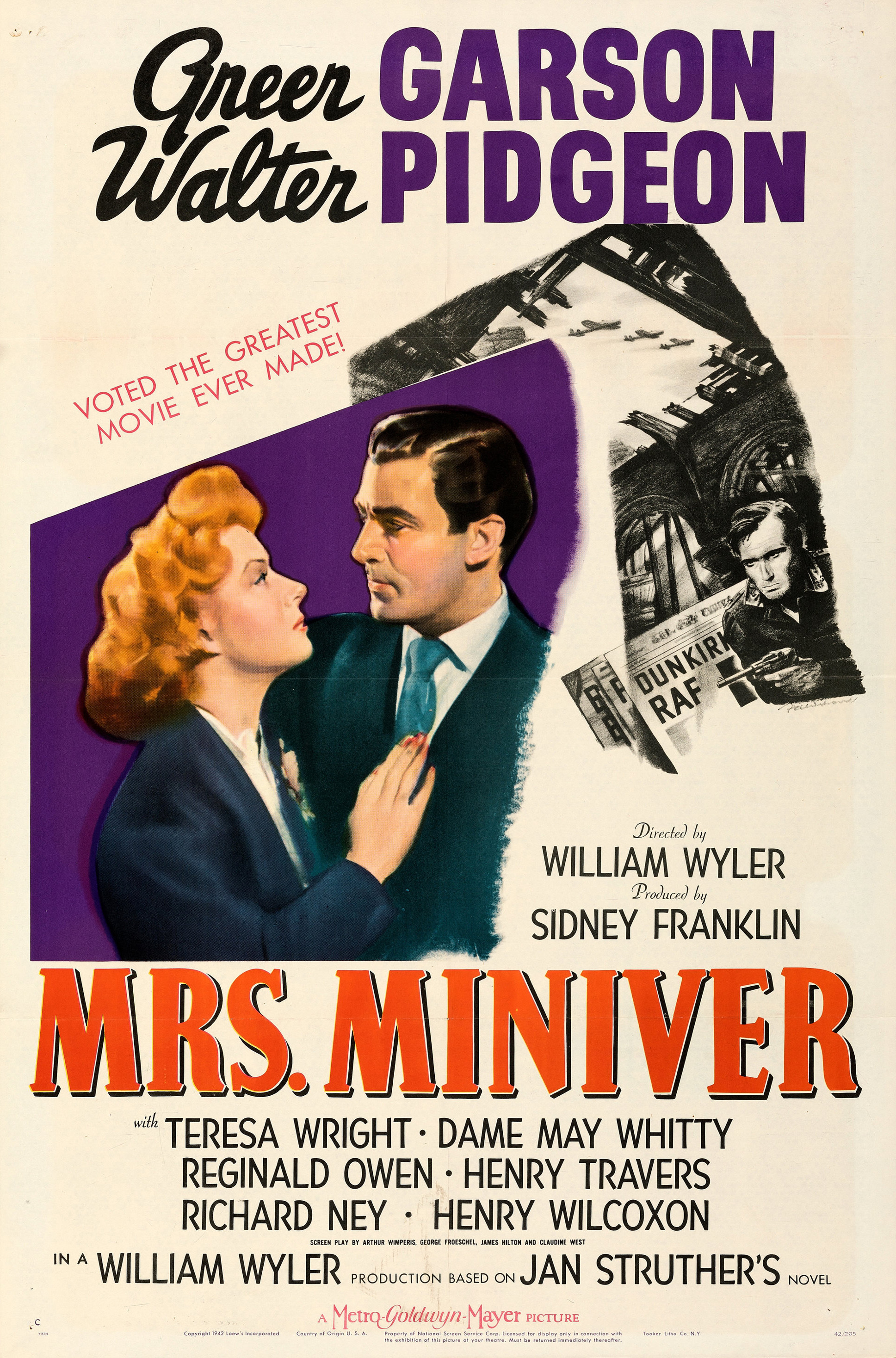
- Theatrical release poster
- Directed by: William Wyler
- Screenplay by: Arthur Wimperis; George Froeschel; James Hilton; Claudine West
- Based on: Mrs. Miniver; 1939 book (from newspaper column Mrs. Miniver) by Jan Struther
- Produced by: Sidney Franklin
- Starring: Greer Garson; Walter Pidgeon; Teresa Wright; May Whitty; Reginald Owen; Henry Travers; Richard Ney; Henry Wilcoxon
- Cinematography: Joseph Ruttenberg
- Edited by: Harold F. Kress
- Music by: Herbert Stothart; Daniele Amfitheatrof (uncredited)
- Production company: Metro-Goldwyn-Mayer
- Distributed by: Loew's Inc.
- Release dates: June 4, 1942 (Radio City Music Hall, New York City); July 22, 1942 (Los Angeles)
- Running time: 133 minutes
- Country: United States
- Language: English
- Budget: $1.34 million
- Box office: $8.9 million

Mrs. Miniver is a 1942 American romantic war drama film directed by William Wyler, and starring Greer Garson and Walter Pidgeon. Inspired by the 1940 novel Mrs. Miniver by Jan Struther, it shows how the life of an unassuming British housewife in rural England is affected by World War II. Produced and distributed by Metro-Goldwyn-Mayer, its supporting cast includes Teresa Wright, May Whitty, Reginald Owen, Henry Travers, Richard Ney and Henry Wilcoxon.

Mrs. Miniver was a critical and a commercial success, becoming the highest-grossing film of the year and winning six Academy Awards, including Best Picture, Best Director, Best Actress (Garson), and Best Supporting Actress (Teresa Wright). It was the first film centered on World War II to win Best Picture, and the first to receive five acting nominations. The film ranked 40th on the American Film Institute's list of most inspirational movies. In 2009, the film was selected for preservation in the United States National Film Registry by the Library of Congress as "culturally, historically, or aesthetically significant".

A sequel, The Miniver Story (1950) was made with Greer Garson and Walter Pidgeon reprising their roles.

== Plot ==
Kay Miniver lives a comfortable life in Belham, a fictional village outside London. Her devoted husband, Clem, is an architect. They have three children: the youngsters, Toby and Judy, and an older son, Vin, a student at Oxford University.

As World War II looms, Vin returns from university and meets Carol Beldon, granddaughter of Lady Beldon from nearby Beldon Hall. Despite initial disagreements, they fall in love. As the war comes closer to home, Vin enlists in the Royal Air Force, qualifying as a fighter pilot. He is posted to a base near his parents' home and can signal his safe return from operations to his parents by "blipping" his engine briefly as he flies over the house. Vin proposes to Carol in front of his family at home.

Together with other boat owners, Clem volunteers to take his motorboat, the Starling, to assist in the Dunkirk evacuation. Early one morning, Kay wanders down to the landing stage and discovers a wounded German pilot hiding in her garden. He takes her to the house at gunpoint, where she feeds him, calmly disarms him when he collapses, and calls the police. Soon after, Clem returns home, exhausted, from Dunkirk.

Lady Beldon visits Kay to try to convince her to talk Vin out of marrying Carol on account of her granddaughter's comparative youth at age eighteen and short engagement. Kay reminds her that she, too, had been young when she married her late husband. Lady Beldon concedes defeat. Carol marries Vin, becoming another Mrs. Miniver even though she fears Vin is likely to be killed in action. During an air raid, Kay and her family take refuge in their Anderson shelter in the garden and attempt to keep their minds off the bombing by reading Alice's Adventures in Wonderland. They narrowly survive as a bomb destroys part of the house. Vin and Carol return from their honeymoon in Scotland and see the damage to the house, but Kay has arranged Vin's room for them.

At the annual village flower show, Lady Beldon disregards the judges' decision that her rose is the winner. Instead, she announces the rose entered by the local stationmaster, Mr. Ballard, named the "Mrs. Miniver" as the winner, with her own Beldon Rose taking second prize. As air raid sirens sound and the villagers take refuge in the cellars of Beldon Hall, Kay and Carol drive Vin to join his squadron. On their journey home, they see a German ME-110 lose a dogfight and crash. Immediately afterwards, two fighters duel at treetop level. Realizing Carol has been wounded by machine-gun fire from the planes, Kay takes her back to Starlings, where she dies.

The villagers assemble at the bomb-damaged church where their vicar affirms their determination in a sermon. Lady Beldon stands alone in her family's church pew. Vin moves to stand alongside her, united in grief, as the members of the congregation sing "Onward, Christian Soldiers". Meanwhile, visible through the holes in the roof, RAF fighters in "V for Victory" formations depart to face the enemy.

== Cast ==
- Greer Garson as Kay Miniver
- Walter Pidgeon as Clem Miniver
- Teresa Wright as Carol Beldon (later young Mrs. Miniver)
- May Whitty as Lady Beldon
- Reginald Owen as Foley
- Henry Travers as Mr. Ballard
- Richard Ney as Vin Miniver (Note: Soon after playing Garson's son in the film, Richard Ney married Garson, who was 11 years his senior.)
- Henry Wilcoxon as the Vicar (Note: Sub-Lieut. Robert Owen Wilcoxon, RNVR, only brother of Henry Wilcoxon, assisted in the Dunkirk evacuation on 29 May 1940 – a year before work started on filming Mrs. Miniver – and was fatally injured by a bomb dropped from a German aircraft.)
- Christopher Severn as Toby Miniver
- Brenda Forbes as Gladys (Housemaid)
- Clare Sandars as Judy Miniver
- Marie De Becker as Ada
- Helmut Dantine as German flyer
- John Abbott as Fred
- Connie Leon as Simpson
- Rhys Williams as Horace
- Mary Field as Miss Spriggins (uncredited)
- Peter Lawford as a pilot (uncredited)
- Charles Bennett as milkman (uncredited)
- Harry Allen as William (uncredited)
- Billy Bevan as bus conductor (uncredited)
- Eula Morgan as Glee club member (uncredited)

== Production ==
The film entered pre-production in the autumn of 1940, when the United States was still a neutral country. Over the several months the screenplay was written, the U.S. moved closer to war. As a result, scenes were rewritten to reflect Americans' more realistic view of the war. For example, the scene where Mrs. Miniver confronts a downed German pilot in her garden was made more confrontational in each revision. Originally the film was to be shot at MGM's studios in Denham, England but due to the difficulties of the war it was switched to Culver City, California.

Following the Japanese attack on Pearl Harbor that brought the U.S. into the war, the garden scene was re-filmed to reflect the tough, new spirit of a nation at war. The key difference was that in the new version of the scene, filmed in February 1942, Mrs. Miniver was allowed to slap the pilot across the face. The film was released four months later.

Wilcoxon and director William Wyler "wrote and re-wrote" the key sermon scene the night before it was shot. The speech "made such an impact that it was used in essence by President Roosevelt as a morale builder and part of it was the basis for leaflets printed in various languages and dropped over enemy and occupied territory". Roosevelt ordered the film rushed to the theaters for propaganda purposes. The sermon dialogue was reprinted in Time and Look magazines.

== Reception ==
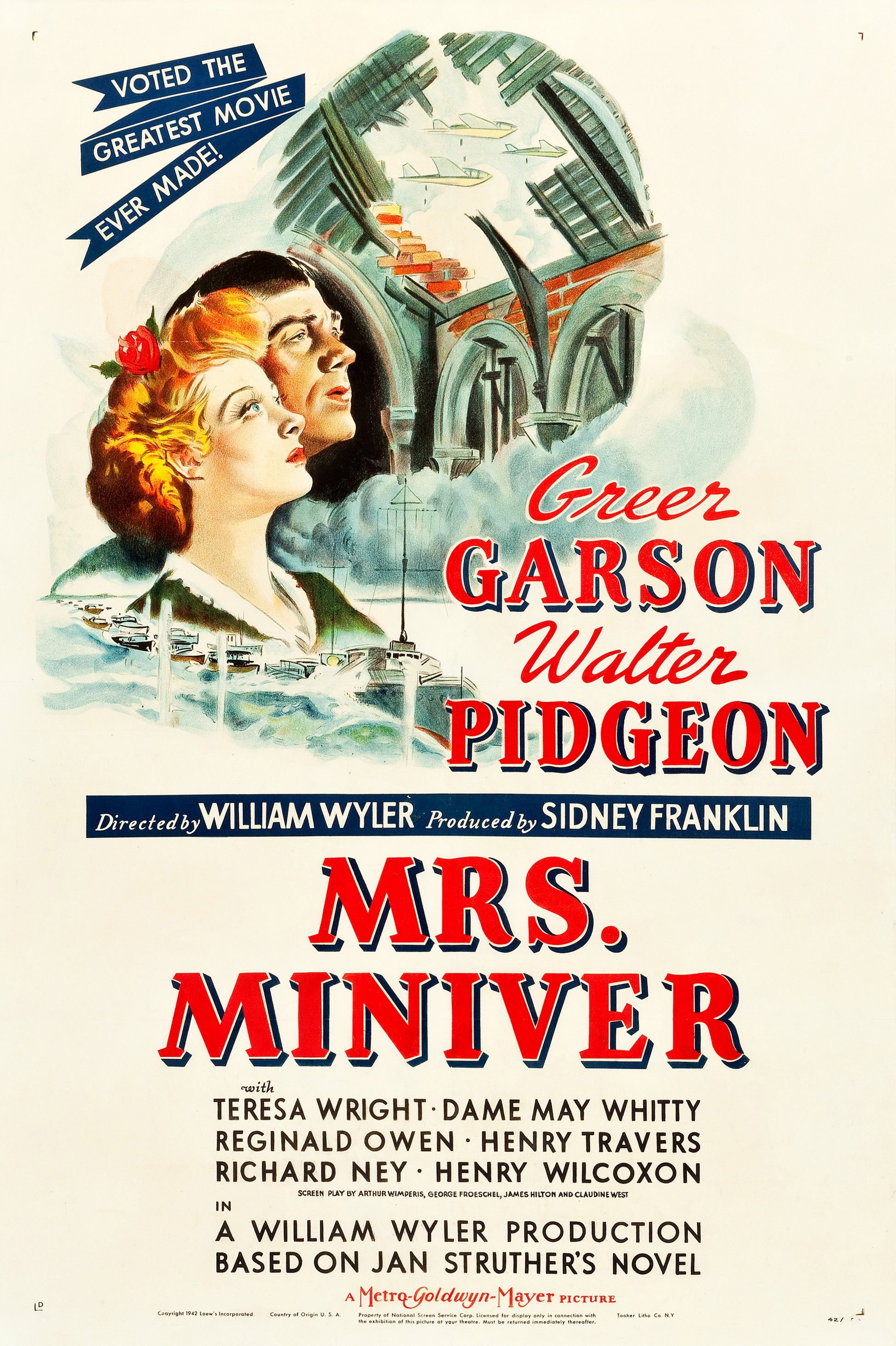
Alternate theatrical release poster

=== Critical response ===
Mrs. Miniver had a profound impact on British audiences. Historian Tony Judt wrote that it was "a very English tale of domestic fortitude and endurance, of middle-class reticence and perseverance, set symptomatically around the disaster at Dunkirk where all these qualities were taken to be most on display—[it] was a pure product of Hollywood. Yet for the English generation that first saw it the film would long remain the truest representation of national memory and self-image."

On Rotten Tomatoes, the film holds an approval rating of 93% based on 69 reviews, with an average rating of 7.8/10. The website's critical consensus reads: "An excessively sentimental piece of propaganda, Mrs. Miniver nonetheless succeeds, due largely to Greer Garson's powerful performance."

In 2006, the film was ranked No. 40 on the American Film Institute's list of the most inspiring American films of all time. In 2009, it was named to the National Film Registry by the Library of Congress as "culturally, historically, or aesthetically" significant:

This remarkably touching wartime melodrama pictorials the classic British stiff upper lip and the courage of a middle-class English family (headed by Greer Garson and Walter Pidgeon) amid the chaos of air raids and family loss. The film's iconic tribute to the sacrifices on the home front, as movingly directed by William Wyler, did much to rally America's support for its British allies.

Film critic Manny Farber, writing in The New Republic, registered this response to the picture:

Mrs. Miniver is about an English family which is prissy and fake like all screen families. The five Minivers are all very pretty and behave according to Will Hays and whoever wrote Little Lord Fauntleroy. Greer Garson makes motherhood seem the profession of impeccable taste and Walter Pidgeon acts the wise father by smoking a pipe, nodding his head knowingly and saying nothing…The older son is a mother’s delight from Oxford, and the two little Minivers make those irritating and unchildlike smart cracks because it’s the one device known these days for comedy relief in family pictures…the difference between these people and their originals in Jan Struther’s novel is the difference between marshmallows and human beings.

In 1942 Variety wrote in its review:

The film, in its quiet yet actionful way, is, probably entirely unintentionally, one of the strongest pieces of propaganda against complacency to come out of the war. Not that it shows anything like the result of lack of planning by governments or individuals, but in that it brings so close to home the effects of total war.

Of the 592 critics polled by American magazine Film Daily, 555 named it the best film of the year.

=== Reactions of Nazi propaganda ===
Joseph Goebbels, minister of Nazi propaganda, wrote:

[Mrs. Miniver] shows the destiny of a family during the current war, and its refined powerful propagandistic tendency has up to now only been dreamed of. There is not a single angry word spoken against Germany; nevertheless the anti-German tendency is perfectly accomplished.

=== Box office ===
Mrs. Miniver exceeded all expectations, grossing $5,358,000 in the US and Canada and $3,520,000 abroad. In the United Kingdom, it was named the top box office attraction of 1942. The initial theatrical release earned a profit of $4,831,000, making it MGM's most successful film to that time.

== Awards and honors ==
| Award | Category | Nominee(s) | Result |
|---|---|---|---|
| Academy Awards | Best Picture | Sidney Franklin (for Metro-Goldwyn-Mayer) | Won |
| Academy Awards | Best Director | William Wyler | Won |
| Academy Awards | Best Actor | Walter Pidgeon | Nominated |
| Academy Awards | Best Actress | Greer Garson (Note: Garson's Oscar acceptance speech was the longest of all time, taking five-and-a-half minutes to finish. A 45-second time limit was imposed on acceptance speeches shortly thereafter.) | Won |
| Academy Awards | Best Supporting Actor | Henry Travers | Nominated |
| Academy Awards | Best Supporting Actress | May Whitty | Nominated |
| Academy Awards | Best Supporting Actress | Teresa Wright | Won |
| Academy Awards | Best Adapted Screenplay | George Froeschel, James Hilton, Claudine West and Arthur Wimperis | Won |
| Academy Awards | Best Cinematography – Black-and-White | Joseph Ruttenberg | Won |
| Academy Awards | Best Film Editing | Harold F. Kress | Nominated |
| Academy Awards | Best Sound Recording | Douglas Shearer | Nominated |
| Academy Awards | Best Special Effects | A. Arnold Gillespie, Warren Newcombe and Douglas Shearer | Nominated |
| National Board of Review Awards | Top Ten Films | Mrs. Miniver | Won |
| National Board of Review Awards | Best Acting | Greer Garson (also for Random Harvest) | Won |
| National Board of Review Awards | Best Acting | Teresa Wright | Won |
| National Film Preservation Board | National Film Registry | Mrs. Miniver | Inducted |
| New York Film Critics Circle Awards | Best Actress | Greer Garson | Nominated |

American Film Institute

- AFI's 100 Years... 100 Cheers - #40

== Sequel and adaptations ==
- In 1943, the film was adapted into an episode of the Lux Radio Theatre. That episode in turn was popular enough to inspire a 5-day a week serial, starring radio veteran Trudy Warner on CBS.
- In 1950, a film sequel, The Miniver Story, was made with Garson and Pidgeon reprising their roles.
- In 1960, a 90-minute television adaptation directed by Marc Daniels was broadcast on CBS, with Maureen O'Hara as Mrs. Miniver and Leo Genn as Clem Miniver.
- In 2015, a musical adaptation was written and presented at a community theater in Little Rock, Arkansas.

== In popular culture ==
- The Early Bird Dood It!: the bird and the worm encounter a billboard for the "film" Mrs. Minimum, a spoof on Mrs. Miniver.
- Jackson & Perkins introduced medium-red hybrid tea rose "Mrs. Miniver" in 1944, named after Mr. Ballard's rose. In 2015, one remaining plant was located in Germany. It was successfully propagated by St Bridget's Nurseries in Exeter in 2016 and returned to commerce in 2017.
- Downton Abbey, "Best Bloom Title": Violet Crawley gives her award away at a flower show, à la Lady Beldon.
- A Raisin in the Sun: Brother, Ruth, and Beneatha give Lena a gift with the note "To our own Mrs. Miniver".

== Bibliography ==
- Farber, Manny. 2009. Farber on Film: The Complete Film Writings of Manny Farber. Edited by Robert Polito. Library of America. ISBN 978-1-59853-050-6
