= Self Made Lady =

1932 film

- Directed by: George King
- Written by: Billie Bristow; Douglas Newton (novel); Brock Williams
- Produced by: George King
- Starring: Heather Angel; Henry Wilcoxon; Amy Veness
- Cinematography: Geoffrey Faithfull; Arthur Grant
- Edited by: Arthur Seabourne
- Music by: Peter Yorke
- Production company: George King Productions
- Distributed by: United Artists
- Release date: March 1932
- Running time: 68 minutes (cut down from 77 minutes)
- Country: United Kingdom
- Language: English

Self Made Lady is a 1932 British drama film directed by George King and starring Heather Angel, Henry Wilcoxon and Amy Veness. It marked the screen debut of Louis Hayward who later became a star in Hollywood. The film was made at the Nettlefold Studios in Walton-on-Thames. Cut down from its original running time of 77 minutes, it was distributed as a second feature by United Artists to allow the company to fulfill its quota requirement.

== Cast ==
- Heather Angel as Sookey
- Henry Wilcoxon as Bert Taverner
- Amy Veness as Old Sookey
- A. Bromley Davenport as Duke of Alchester
- Louis Hayward as Paul Geneste
- Charles Cullum as Lord Max Mariven
- Ronald Ritchie as Alf Naylor
- Doris Gilmore as Claudine
- Harry Adnes as Roberts
- Oriel Ross as Lady Poppy
- Lola Duncan Mrs. Stoach
- Violet Hopson as Annie
- Charles Callum

== Bibliography ==
- Low, Rachael. Filmmaking in 1930s Britain. George Allen & Unwin, 1985.
- Wood, Linda. British Films, 1927-1939. British Film Institute, 1986.
