= When a Knight Won His Spurs =

1931 hymn, with text by Jan Struther

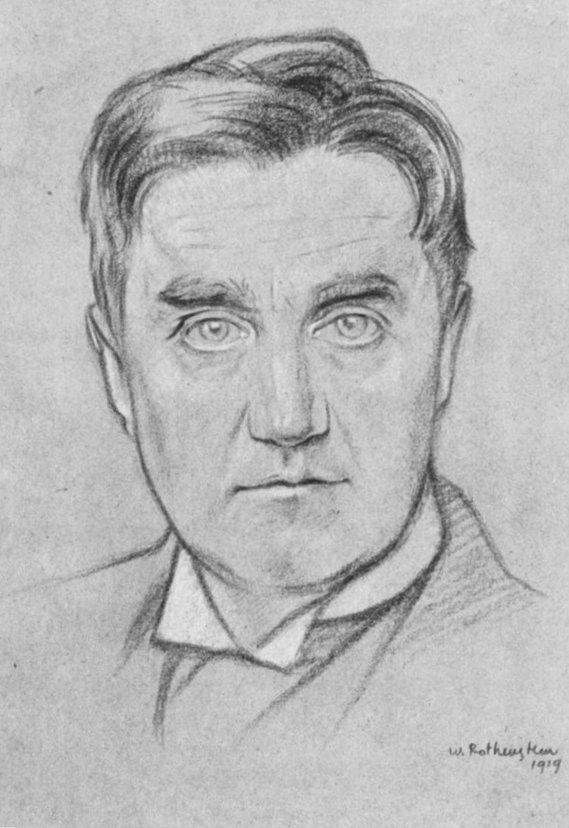
- Ralph Vaughan Williams by William Rothenstein
- Genre: Hymn
- Written: 1931
- Text: Jan Struther
- Based on: Ephesians 6:10-17
- Meter: 11.11.11.11
- Melody: "Stowey" harmonised by Ralph Vaughan Williams

When a Knight Won His Spurs is a children's hymn written by Jan Struther and set to a folk melody (Stowey) and harmonised by Ralph Vaughan Williams. The hymn first appeared in Songs of Praise in 1931.

The tune was collected from Mr Robert Dibble of Bridgwater, Somerset (30 miles from Stowey) on the 15th of August 1905 by Cecil Sharp. The title of the song collected from Mr Dibble was given as ‘Sweet Europe’ by Sharp, with the first line ‘As I walked out one morning in Spring’ (CJS2/10/555).

The hymn is sometimes performed by folk singers on account of the folk origins of its tune, notably by Martin Simpson during Prom 5 (Folk day - part 2) in the BBC Proms on July 20, 2008.

An up tempo version can be found on Blyth Power's 1990 album Alnwick and Tyne.

== Lyrics ==
The lyrics in their original form are:

When a knight won his spurs, in the stories of old,
He was gentle and brave, he was gallant and bold
With a shield on his arm and a lance in his hand,
For God and for valour he rode through the land.

No charger have I, and no sword by my side,
Yet still to adventure and battle I ride,
Though back into storyland giants have fled,
And the knights are no more and the dragons are dead.

Let faith be my shield and let joy be my steed
'Gainst the dragons of anger, the ogres of greed;
And let me set free with the sword of my youth,
From the castle of darkness, the power of the truth.

== Recordings ==
"When a knight won his spurs" (2008)
2mins 04 seconds from Hymns without Words Vol 3.

Libera (2004), Free, EMI Classics cat. no. 57823. Emilia Dalby (2009) "Emilia" Signum Classics cat no. SIGCD 141

== Other usage ==
This hymn was used as part of the poem entitled "Headmaster's Hymn" by Alan Ahlberg in his book entitled Please Mrs Butler. The poem is about the hymn being sung by the school in an assembly, with constant interruption from the headmaster as a few children are misbehaving.
