= Lord of All Hopefulness =

Christian hymn by writer Jan Struther

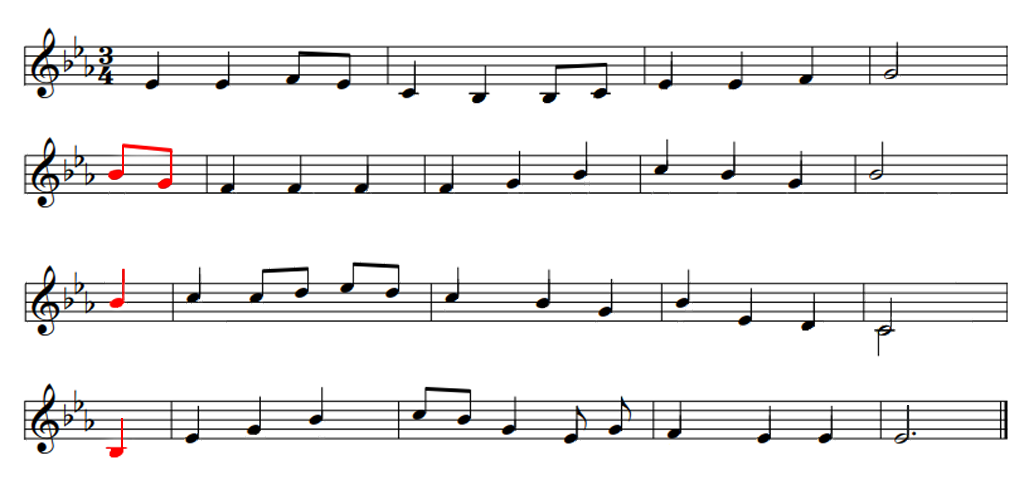
- The hymn tune
- Genre: Hymn
- Text: Jan Struther
- Meter: 10.11.11.12
- Published: 1931

Lord of all hopefulness, Lord of all joy,
whose trust, ever childlike, no cares could destroy,
be there at our waking, and give us, we pray,
your bliss in our hearts, Lord, at the break of the day.

Lord of all kindliness, Lord of all grace,
your hands swift to welcome, your arms to embrace,
be there at our homing, and give us, we pray,
your love in our hearts, Lord, at the eve of the day.

— Jan Struther

"Lord of all Hopefulness" is a Christian hymn written by English writer Jan Struther, which was published in the enlarged edition of Songs of Praise (Oxford University Press) in 1931. The hymn is used in liturgy, at weddings and at the beginning of funeral services, and is one of the most popular hymns in the United Kingdom.

"Lord of all Hopefulness" is commonly set to the melody of an Irish folksong named Slane. In English hymn books, where traditional folk tunes are used, the place of collection is sometimes attributed as the tune name, and this melody is named after the Hill of Slane, the site where St. Patrick lit an Easter fire in defiance of the pagan king, Lóegaire, near the village of the same name.

Slane is also the melody of another well-known hymn, "Be Thou My Vision," and of the hymn "Lord of Creation, to Thee be All Praise" by J. C. Winslow, whose lyrics are similar. There are two variants of this tune; the text of "Lord Of All Hopefulness" fits a metre of 10.11.11.11, and an anacrucial version of Slane must be used (with an upbeat on the 2nd, 3rd and 4th lines of each verse). (Note: "Lord of Creation, to Thee be All Praise" also has to be sung using the anacrucial version.) Another variant of the tune, commonly used in Irish and Scottish hymnals (including the Hymnbooks of the Church of Scotland), fits the 10.10.10.10 metre and is not suitable for "Lord of all Hopefulness". The tune has its origin as a traditional Irish tune, principally 'With my Love on the Road', also known as 'The Banks of the Bann'.

"Lord of all Hopefulness" has also been given its own tune, Miniver (originally in The BBC Hymn Book 1951), written by Cyril Vincent Taylor which acknowledges Jan Struther by reference to her famous character "Mrs Miniver."

"Lord of all Hopefulness" was the opening hymn at the wedding of Prince Harry and Meghan Markle on 19 May 2018.

== Publication ==
The hymn is included in a number of popular Christian hymn books, including the New English Hymnal and Hymns and Psalms It is sometimes included in Christian children's songbooks.

This hymn can also be found in the 1971 combined red Hymn Book of the Anglican Church of Canada and the United Church of Canada, set to the tune Avonlea by Stanley Osborne, with a note saying that it could also be sung to the tune Slane with a few modifications to the melody. It is also sung by Catholic congregations in the U.S.

== See also ==
- Be Thou My Vision, an Irish hymn sung to the same tune
