= Katherine Orrison =

American film producer

- Born: November 18, 1948 (age 77) Anniston, Alabama, United States
- Occupation: Author, film scholar, screenwriter
- Period: 1991–present
- Genre: Film criticism, screenwriting
- Subject: Cecil B. De Mille; The Ten Commandments (1923 and 1956); Henry Wilcoxon; Gary Cooper

Katherine Orrison (born November 18, 1948) is an American set decorator, art director, producer, costumer, author and film historian specializing in the films of Cecil B. DeMille, the life and career of actor Henry Wilcoxon, and the epic film The Ten Commandments.

== Early life and education ==
Orrison was born in Anniston, Alabama to John M. Orrison and Mary H. Orrison. She spent time visiting her grandparents in Pompano Beach, Florida when she was young. She was inspired to pursue film after seeing The Ten Commandments film when she was 9 years old. She even started putting lamb's blood on her doorposts after seeing the film.

Orrison graduated from the Sacred Heart Convent in Cullman, Alabama in 1966. She later attended the Pasadena Playhouse College of Theater Arts (in Pasadena, California). She married Peter Coe, but their marriage was annulled in 1969. After the annulment, Orrison worked for various companies like Filmation and Disney on animated films and commercials from 1969 to 1980. She then attended the American Film Institute in Beverly Hills, California from 1980 through 1982.

== Career ==
After leaving the American Film Institute, Orrison worked in the Hollywood film industry for over twenty years as an animation checker, associate producer, production manager, art director, set decorator and costumer. Her body of work included Miracle Mile (1988) and The Doors (1991). She also restored and decorated the Mayan Theater in downtown Los Angeles.

Orrison wrote for Cult Movies magazine writing on topics like Lawrence of Arabia, actresses Yvonne De Carlo and Joan Woodbury, the re-modeling of Cecil B. De Mille's home in Los Feliz, and Blade Runner. In addition, she wrote in their book review column. She worked for Cult Movies for over ten years.

Orrison was a film historian in various television documentaries. Orrison is also an author: she wrote a biography of Henry Wilcoxon called Lionheart in Hollywood which she worked on for two and a half years. Another one of her books was titled Written in Stone: Making Cecil B. DeMille's Epic "The Ten Commandments". She has also collaborated on screenplays like Rave-On Macbeth (2002) a European screenplay.

On September 7, 1971, Orrison married Sherman Labby, who was also involved in the film industry as a production illustrator and storyboard artist. He died in 1998 from the effects of muscular dystrophy.

== Selected filmography ==
| Film | Contribution |
|---|---|
| Ritzville (1981) | Associate producer |
| Dark Sanity (1982) | Costumer |
| Stacy's Knights (1983) | Second assistant, art department |
| Running Hot (1984) | Set decorator |
| The Lost Empire (1984) | Costumer |
| Shadows in the Storm (1988) | Set decorator |
| Miracle Mile (1988) | Additional set dresser; second unit art director |
| Settle the Score (1989) | Set decorator; second unit TV movie art director |
| Street Asylum (1990) | Craft service |
| Far Out Man (1990) | Stand-by painter |
| Peacemaker (1990–1991) | Set decorator |
| The Nutt House (1992) | Set decorator |
| I Don't Buy Kisses Anymore (1992) | Set decorator |
| Affairs of the Heart (1994) | Video associate producer |
| The Tie That Binds (1995) | Associate producer |
| Hollywood History (2002) | Actor (herself) |

== Bibliography ==
- Wilcoxon, Henry; Orrison, Katherine (1991). Lionheart in Hollywood: the autobiography of Henry Wilcoxon. Virginia: The Scarecrow Press, Inc. ISBN 0-8108-2476-0.
- Orrison, Katherine (1999). Written in Stone: Making Cecil B. DeMille's Epic The Ten Commandments. Vestal, NY: Vestal Press. ISBN 1-879511-24-X.
- Son of a Beach: Movie-Mad Memoirs of Aron Kincaid (2019). Independent. ISBN 978-1702408363
- Caravans (poems, 2021). BookBaby, NJ. ISBN 978-1098399931
