= Ray Bradley (artist) =

British artist, designer and lecturer

- Born: 9 March 1938 (age 88); Sutton, Surrey, England
- Education: Wimbledon School of Art(1955–1957); Royal College of Art (1959–1962)
- Website: www.bradleybasso.com

Ray Bradley is a British artist, designer and lecturer, working primarily in architectural stained glass, architectural glass art and allied media.

Bradley has had a studio in West London for over 50 years. He has been a lecturer and tutor at various colleges, including at Chelsea College of Arts. His work is included in the Victoria and Albert Museum collection, Science Museum and the Bill Douglas Cinema Museum.

Since 2004 he has been in a creative partnership with British-Friulian artist, Denise mt Basso, forming Bradley+Basso studios.

== Biography ==
=== Education ===
Bradley was born in Surrey, and attended Ewell Castle School where his favourite subject area was mathematics, particularly geometry, but his most natural inclinations were for art and athletics.

Bradley studied at Wimbledon School of Art from 1953 to 1957 He completed a four-year art and design course, where he gained an Intermediate Diploma in 1955, followed by the National Diploma in Design within the specialist area of stained glass in 1957.

He studied at Royal College of Art from 1959 to 1962. During this period he lived in Notting Hill.

=== Career ===
Bradley has designed and produced commissioned works using glass and other materials, in two and three-dimensional form, for public, private, religious and secular architectural spaces in England, Europe, Africa, the Middle and Far East, and Australasia. In his final year at the RCA he was awarded a commission to produce a commemorative stained glass window for the Commando Association to be installed at the Romanesque Church of St Samson in Ouistreham, Normandy, as part the 20th anniversary of the Normandy Landings. In 1966 he was awarded the Sir Arthur Evans travelling scholarship by the Worshipful Company of Glaziers and Painters of Glass, which enabled him to visit historic and contemporary examples of religious glass, primarily in France and Germany. These early projects brought ecclesiastic commissions over succeeding years: the architect, Donald Insall, commissioned him to create two 7m high inclined Sanctuary windows for a large extension for the Church of St Peter, Thundersley – the total project winning a Civic Trust Award (1964); a second window at St Samson Ouistreham (1984), for the 51st (Highland) Division on the 40th anniversary of the Normandy Landings; a window for the Highland Division in Saint-Valery-en-Caux to commemorate 50 years of their special war-time relationship with the town (1990); and a memorial window for Dorney Court, amongst others. He has also received a Crafts Council Bursary and the Churchill Fellowship, visiting the United States of America and writing a report on Glass in Architecture (1988). Bradley became an Artist Freeman of the Glaziers Company in 2005.

==== Teaching ====
As a visiting lecturer, tutor and external assessor he has contributed to study areas in architectural glass, environmental design, fine art and product design. He has taught at several art colleges, including Barnet and Southgate College (1968 -1972), Reigate School of Art and Design, Worthing College of Art and Design (1987–92), and Chelsea College of Arts (1993–2003).

==== Product design ====
Among Bradley's product designs is an optical kaleidoscope (1960), which was exhibited at the Design Centre and British Council trade exhibitions abroad during the 60s–80s, as well as being included in a catalogue of Best British Design, and was stocked in Heal's and the Museum of Modern Art; now included in the Science Museum's permanent collection and the Bill Douglas Cinema Museum (University of Exeter)

Bradley's work appears in numerous books relating to glass art. His work was used for the cover of The English Sunrise (Brian Rice, 1972)

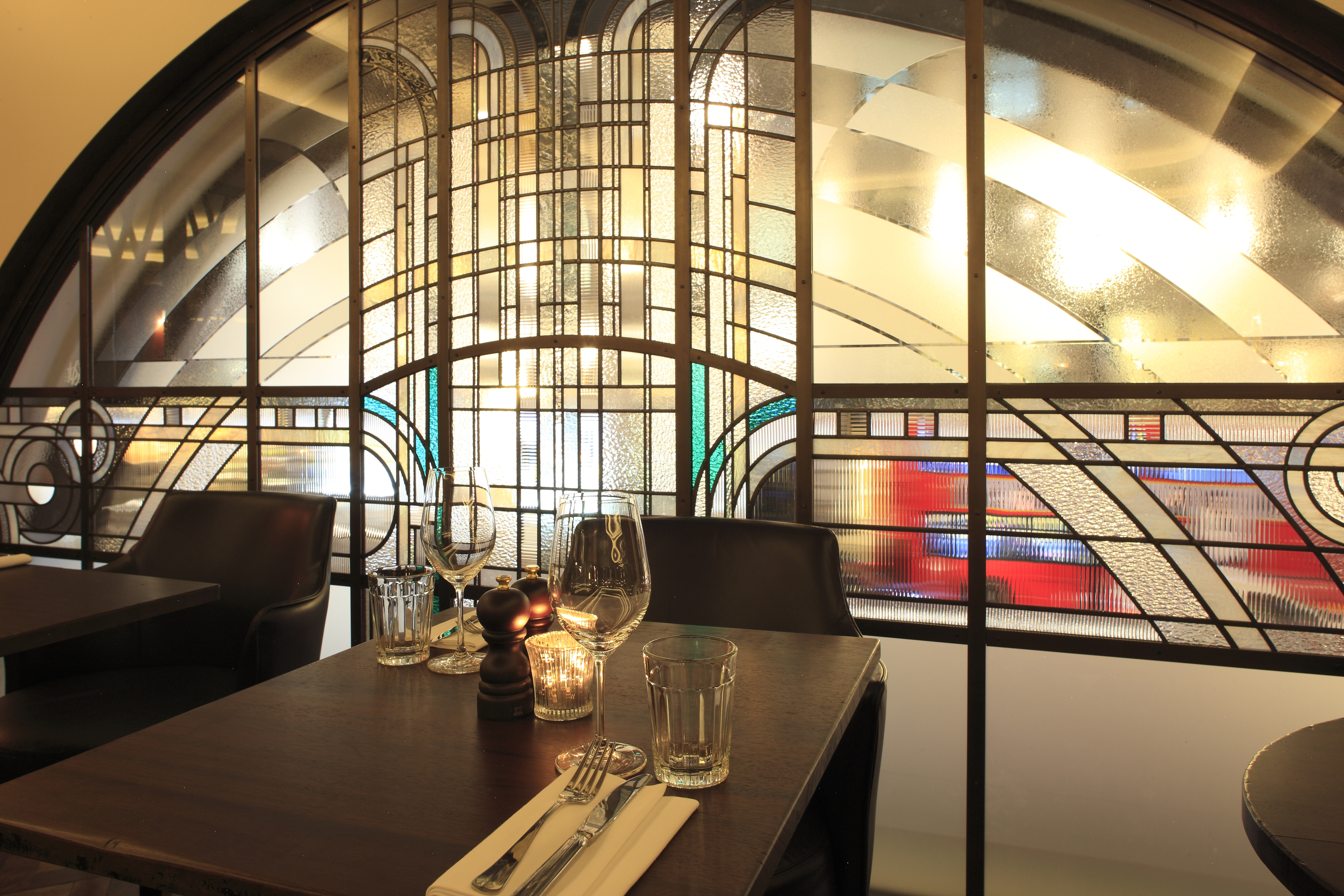
‘Art Deco Reinvented’, Hawksmoor, Piccadilly, Ray Bradley, Bradley+Basso Studios, 2015

=== West London studio and Bradley+Basso ===
In 1964, Bradley set up his studio in a converted Edwardian Coach-house in Brook Green, where he has been based since. In 2004, he formed a creative partnership with the British-Friulian artist, Denise mt Basso, one of his former students and a 1st class BA (Hons) graduate from the Chelsea College of Arts.
