= Henry Wilcoxon =

British-American actor (1905-1984)

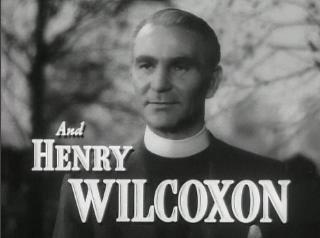
- Wilcoxon in The Miniver Story (1950)
- Born: Harry Frederick Wilcoxon; 8 September 1905; Roseau, Dominica, British Leeward Islands (now Dominica)
- Died: 6 March 1984 (aged 78); Burbank, California, U.S.
- Other name: Harry Wilcoxon
- Occupations: Actor; film producer
- Years active: 1926–1983
- Spouses: Sheila Garrett (m. 1936; div. 1937) Joan Woodbury (m. 1938; div. 1969)
- Children: 3
- Military career
- Allegiance: United States
- Branch: Coast Guard
- Service years: 1941-1946
- Rank: Lieutenant Commander
- Conflicts: World War II

Henry Wilcoxon (born Harry Frederick Wilcoxon; 8 September 1905 – 6 March 1984) was a British-American actor and film producer, born in the British West Indies. He was best known as part of the stock company of director Cecil B. DeMille, playing both leading men and supporting roles, and also serving as DeMille's associate producer on his later films.

== Early life ==
Wilcoxon was born on 8 September 1905 in Roseau, Dominica (then administered as part of the British Leeward Islands). His English-born father was Robert Stanley 'Tan' Wilcoxon, manager of the Colonial Bank in Jamaica and his mother, Lurline Mignonette Nunes, was a Jamaican amateur theatre actress, descendant of a wealthy Spanish merchant family.

Henry was close with his older brother, Robert Owen Wilcoxon, known as 'Owen'. Henry (known then by his born name, Harry) had a difficult childhood. His mother "disappeared suddenly and mysteriously" (presumably she died) when he was about a year old, and his father took him and Owen (aged four) to England with the intention that his own mother, Ann Wilcoxon, would care for them. But because the grandmother was too frail to care for the children, they were first sent to a bad foster home, where they became ill from malnutrition and neglect until this was discovered by the authorities, and they were moved to an orphanage. Harry suffered from rickets, and Owen developed a stutter and had epileptic fits. They were rescued from the orphanage to a new foster home run by the more caring Stewart family, at Springfield House in Acton, London.

After several years Tan Wilcoxon, with his new wife Rosamond, took the children home with them to Bridgetown, Barbados, where they were educated. Harry was sent to Wolmer's Boys School in Kingston, Jamaica and Harrison College, Barbados. Harry later claimed that at 14 he was 'almost' the underwater swimming champion of Barbados and good enough to become a salvage diver. He was also an avid amateur boxer, earning him and his brother Owen the nicknames 'Biff' and 'Bang'.

== Acting ==
After completing his education, Wilcoxon moved to London, where he was employed by Joseph Rank, the father of J. Arthur Rank, before working for Bond Street tailors Pope and Bradshaw. While working for the tailors, Wilcoxon applied for a visa to work as a chauffeur in the United States, but upon seeing his application refused, returned to boxing, and then to acting.

=== Stage ===
Harry Wilcoxon's first stage performance was as a supporting actor in an adaptation of the novel The 100th Chance, by Ethel M. Dell, in November 1927 at Blackpool, before he joined the Birmingham Repertory Theatre the next year and toured "for several years" playing "all roles that came his way." Among these roles, he found critical success playing Captain Cook in a production of Rudolph Besier's The Barretts of Wimpole Street at the London Queen's Theatre alongside Gwen Ffrangcon-Davies, Scott Sunderland and Cedric Hardwicke. In June 1932, at the Queen's Theatre, he played Donald Gage alongside Edith Evans as Irela in Sir Barry Jackson's production of Beverley Nichols' novel Evensong.

=== Early screen work ===
Wilcoxon and Claudette Colbert in Cleopatra (1934)

In 1931, Wilcoxon made his screen debut as "Larry Tindale" in The Perfect Lady, followed by a role opposite Heather Angel in Self Made Lady, alongside Louis Hayward and others. In 1932, he appeared in a remake of the 1929 film The Flying Squad (based on the novel by Edgar Wallace), reprising the role originated by future-Hitchcock regular John Longden. Altogether he made eight films in Britain prior to 1934.

Also in 1933, "while acting on stage in Eight Bells, a talent scout for Paramount Pictures reportedly arranged a screen test which came to the attention of producer-director Cecil B. DeMille in Hollywood." DeMille recalls in his autobiography:

One of my longest and closest professional and personal associations began because I was impatient about waiting my turn for the use of a projection room at the studio, while I was casting Cleopatra. I had already engaged Claudette Colbert for the title role, but had not yet found a satisfactory Mark Antony to play opposite her.

However, I did have some film footage of horses that I wanted to see, for possible use in the picture. I took it to the projection room, but found the room in use... While waiting in the booth, I heard, come from the soundtrack of the test film [being shown], a resonant, manly voice, with only a pleasant trace of an English accent... I asked who the young actor was.

'Oh,' I was told, 'he's a young Englishman that Paramount signed from the London stage. Name of Harry Wilcoxon, but the executives don't think Harry is dignified enough, so we're changing his name to Henry Wilcoxon.'

'Harry or Henry,' I said, 'he is Marc Antony.' "

So he was renamed by DeMille for the role of Marc Antony in Cleopatra, and from then on he was Henry Wilcoxon.

Wilcoxon was next given the lead role of Richard the Lionheart in DeMille's big-budget film The Crusades (1935) opposite Loretta Young. That film, however, was a financial failure, "losing more than $700,000". After the lack of success of The Crusades, Wilcoxon's career stalled; although he featured—and starred—in a number of films, most were "minor B's like The President's Mystery and Prison Nurse for Republic [Pictures]." Wilcoxon himself deemed his worst acting job to be in Mysterious Mr. Moto (1938), in which year he played in If I Were King and featured in Five of a Kind with the Dionne quintuplets.

== The war years ==
In 1941, Wilcoxon appeared as Captain Hardy, alongside Laurence Olivier and Vivien Leigh, in Alexander Korda's Lady Hamilton, during the filming of which:

a wad of flame fell from a torch directly on Olivier's head, setting his wig afire. Wilcoxon, standing right beside him, tried to extinguish the blaze but was unsuccessful. Finally he had to wrench the wig from Olivier's head, but both of his hands were badly burned while Olivier's eyebrows were scorched."

When the U.S. entered World War II in December 1941, Wilcoxon enlisted in the United States Coast Guard, supposedly "leaving his home 20 minutes after the announcement that the U.S. had declared war and proceeding to enlist then and there." He served with the Coast Guard until 1946, gaining the rank of lieutenant commander.

During his period of service, three films in which he appeared were released in 1942, among them Mrs. Miniver, which received considerable public acclaim, as well as six Academy Awards. Wilcoxon, in his role as the vicar, "wrote and re-wrote" the key sermon with director William Wyler "the night before the sequence was to be shot." The speech "made such an impact that it was used in essence by President Roosevelt as a morale builder and part of it was the basis for leaflets printed in various languages and dropped over enemy and occupied territory."

Upon his return from war service, Wilcoxon "picked up his relationship with Cecil B. DeMille" with Unconquered, and after starring as Sir Lancelot in the 1949 musical version of Mark Twain's A Connecticut Yankee in King Arthur's Court (with Bing Crosby in the title role), he featured (with "fifth starring billing") in DeMille's Samson and Delilah (1949). To help pre-sell the film, "DeMille arranged for Wilcoxon to tour the country giving a series of lectures on the film and its research in 41 key cities in the United States and Canada." However, "after the fourteenth city," Wilcoxon collapsed "from a mild bout of pneumonia," (actually tuberculosis), and the tour was continued by "press-agent Richard Condon and Ringling Brothers public relations man Frank Braden" (who also collapsed, in Minneapolis). Condon finished touring by the time of the film's release in October 1949. Wilcoxon, meanwhile, had returned to England under contract to feature in The Miniver Story (1950), a sequel to the multi-Oscar-winning Mrs. Miniver (1942) in which he reprised his role as the vicar.

== Later life as producer and TV actor ==
In the late 1940s, "several young actors and actresses came to Wilcoxon and wife Joan Woodbury and asked them to form a play-reading group", which began to take shape as the 'Wilcoxon Players' in 1951, when the two "transformed their living room into a stage." 'Guest star' performers sometimes appeared in the plays produced by the group, among them Larry Parks and Corinne Calvet, and soon the "Wilcoxon Group Players Annual Nativity Play" was being performed "at the Miles Playhouse in Santa Monica." The group was recognised by the American Cancer Society in 1956 with a Citation of Merit, awarded for donations received by attendees of the groups Easter productions.

Wilcoxon played a "small but important part" in DeMille's 1952 production The Greatest Show on Earth, on which film he also served as associate producer, helping steer the film towards its Academy Award for Best Picture, 1952. He also acted as associate producer on, and acted (as Pentaur, the pharaoh's captain of the guards) in DeMille's remake of his own The Ten Commandments (1956). Wilcoxon was sole producer on the 1958 film The Buccaneer, a remake of DeMille's 1938 effort, which DeMille only "supervised" (due to his declining health) while Anthony Quinn directed.

After DeMille died, Wilcoxon did "considerable work... in pre-production" on "a film based on the life of Lord Baden-Powell, founder of the Boy Scout movement," which DeMille had left unrealised, and was also ultimately abandoned.

After a relatively inactive period "for the next three or four years," Wilcoxon had a "chance meeting with actor Charlton Heston and director Franklin Schaffner at Universal Studios," a meeting which saw him appear in The War Lord (1965), for which he again "went on tour... visiting 21 cities to publicize the picture."

He was credited as co-producer on a "90-minute tribute to Cecil B. DeMille televised by NBC" entitled The World's Greatest Showman: The Legend of Cecil B. DeMille (1963), whose production was hampered by the absence of "some of DeMille's best-remembered films of the 30s and 40s" when rights-holder MCA refused their use. At the opening of the DeMille Theatre in New York, he produced a "two-reel short," that in the estimation of critic Don Miller "was much better than this 90-minute tribute."

In the last two decades of his life, Wilcoxon worked sporadically and accepted minor acting roles in a number of television and film productions. He guest-starred in shows including Daniel Boone, Perry Mason, I Spy, It Takes a Thief, The Wild Wild West, Gunsmoke, Cimarron Strip, Cagney & Lacey, The Big Valley, Private Benjamin and Marcus Welby, M. D., as well as in a smaller number of films. Wilcoxon is probably best known today for his small but memorable role as the golf-obsessed Bishop Pickering in the classic 1980 comedy Caddyshack. In one scene, he plays golf in the driving rain with groundskeeper Carl, played by actor Bill Murray. It took hours to film the scene, with both actors standing under artificial rain towers and wind machines. In an interview from 2010, Murray called Wilcoxon “a great pro” who “nailed everything he did.” Wilcoxon also told Murray that the book, The Art of Dramatic Writing was an influence in his career.

== Personal life ==
Through loans from the assets he acquired from his early acting career, Wilcoxon assisted his brother Owen in establishing himself in 1931 as a partner in the Vale Motor Company in London. For a short time, Henry showed a personal interest in the development of their sports car, the Vale Special. At that time his female companion was a London-based American stage actress Carol Goodner.

English actress Heather Angel, whom he had previously acted with in Self Made Lady (1932) when they were both in England, had come to Hollywood a few months before Wilcoxon and met him again in 1934. They became lifetime friends. She taught him horse-riding, and acted in two more films with him: The Last of the Mohicans (1936) and Lady Hamilton (1941). Heather Angel and her husband Ralph Forbes were both present at Wilcoxon's wedding to Sheila Garrett.

Wilcoxon married a 19-year-old actress Sheila Garrett on 28 June 1936, but they divorced a year later. When they had first met, two years before they were married, she was introduced by her sister Lynn Browning as "Bonnie", but when they got to know each other better he preferred the name Sheila Garrett.

On 17 December 1938, he married 23 year old actress Joan Woodbury. They had three daughters: Wendy Joan Robert Wilcoxon (1939–2020), Heather Ann Wilcoxon (1947) and Cecilia Dawn "CiCi" Wilcoxon (1950). His second daughter was named after Heather Angel. His youngest daughter was named after Cecil B. DeMille: DeMille said he wanted the child to be called Cecil if it was a boy, but when it turned out to be a girl, DeMille was still insistent, saying "I think Cecilia is a beautiful name! My daughter is named Cecilia." They divorced in 1969.

Wilcoxon was an amateur painter and photographer, whose work was exhibited on at least one occasion in London. He was also "an avid antique collector and accomplished flier."

At his home in Burbank in the summer of 1975 Wilcoxon first met his niece Valerie (1933–2017), the English daughter of his brother Owen with Dorothy Drew (sister of architect Jane Drew). Up until then he did not know that his brother, killed in 1940 during the Dunkirk evacuation, had any children.

=== Death ===
On 6 March 1984, Wilcoxon died of heart failure at his Burbank, California home after suffering from cancer for a number of years. He was 78 years old.

== Cultural references ==
According to author Katherine Orrison, Egyptian president Gamal Abdel Nasser was an admirer of the actor's performance in The Crusades (1935), and took the nickname "Wilcoxon" while at the Royal Military Academy because he aspired to be a great military leader like Richard the Lionheart.

Wilcoxon is mentioned in Quentin Tarantino's 2019 film Once Upon a Time in Hollywood, as one of Rick Dalton's (Leonardo DiCaprio) co-stars in the (fictional) film Tanner.

== Recognition ==
Wilcoxon has a star on the Hollywood Walk of Fame at 6256 Hollywood Blvd. west of Argyle Street, in front of the W Hollywood Hotel & Residences and the Metro B Line Hollywood/Vine station, and across from the Pantages Theater.

== Partial filmography ==
Made in UK:

- The Perfect Lady (1931) as Larry Tindale
- Self Made Lady (1932) as Bert Taverner
- The Flying Squad (1932) as Inspector Bradley
- Taxi to Paradise (1933) as Stephen Randall
- Lord of the Manor (1933) as Jim Bridge
- Princess Charming (1934) as Capt. André Launa
- A Woman Alone (1936) (released in USA as Two Who Dared) as Capt. Nicolai Ilyinski
- Jericho (1937) as Capt. Mack

Made in USA:

- Cleopatra (1934) as Marc Antony
- The Crusades (1935) as King Richard the Lionheart
- The Last of the Mohicans (1936) as Major Heyward
- The President's Mystery (1936) (released in UK as One for All) as James Blake
- Souls at Sea (1937) as Lieutenant Stanley Tarryton
- Jericho (1937) (also titled Dark Sands) as Capt. Mack
- Prison Nurse (1938) as Dale
- Keep Smiling (1938) as Jonathan Rand
- Mysterious Mr. Moto (1938) as Anton Darvak
- If I Were King (1938) as Captain of the Watch
- Five of a Kind (1938) as Dr. Scott Williams
- Woman Doctor (1939) as Allan Graeme
- The Arizona Wildcat (1939) as Richard Baldwin
- Chasing Danger (1939) as Captain Andre Duvac
- Tarzan Finds a Son! (1939) as Mr. Sande
- Free, Blonde and 21 (1940) as Dr. Hugh Mayberry
- The Crooked Road (1940) as Bob Trent
- Earthbound (1940) as Dr. Jeffrey Reynolds
- Mystery Sea Raider (1940) as Captain Jimmy Madden
- The Lone Wolf Takes a Chance (1941) as Frank Jordan
- That Hamilton Woman (a.k.a. Lady Hamilton) (1941) as Captain Hardy
- Scotland Yard (1941) as Dakin Barrolles
- South of Tahiti (1941) as Captain Larkin
- The Corsican Brothers (1941) as Count Victor Franchi
- The Man Who Wouldn't Die (1942) as Dr. Haggard
- Mrs. Miniver (1942) as Vicar
- Johnny Doughboy (1942) as Oliver Lawrence
- Dragnet (1947) as Inspector Geoffrey James
- Unconquered (1947) as Capt. Steele
- A Connecticut Yankee in King Arthur's Court (1949) as Sir Lancelot
- Samson and Delilah (1949) (also associate producer) as Ahtur
- Sunset Boulevard (1950) as Actor on DeMille's 'Samson & Delilah' Set (uncredited)
- The Miniver Story (1950) as Vicar
- The Greatest Show on Earth (1952) (also associate producer) as FBI Agent Gregory
- Scaramouche (1952) as Chevalier de Chabrillaine
- The Ten Commandments (1956) (also associate producer) as Pentaur
- The Buccaneer (1958) (producer only)
- The War Lord (1965) as Frisian Prince
- The Private Navy of Sgt. O'Farrell (1968) as Rear Admiral Arthur L. Stokes
- Man in the Wilderness (1971) as Indian Chief
- Doomsday Machine (1972) as Dr. Christopher Perry
- Against a Crooked Sky (1975) as Cut Tongue / Narrator
- Won Ton Ton, the Dog Who Saved Hollywood (1976) as Silent Film Director
- Pony Express Rider (1976) as Trevor Kingman
- When Every Day Was the Fourth of July (1978) as Judge Henry J. Wheeler
- F. I. S. T. (1978) as Win Talbot
- The Man with Bogart's Face (1978) as Mr. Chevalier
- Caddyshack (1980) as Bishop Fred Pickering
- Sweet Sixteen (1983) as Greyfeather (final film role)

== Bibliography ==
- Cox, David (2006). Ave Atque Vale – the story of the Vale Special. Berkshire: Martin Publications. ISBN 0-9553010-0-9.
- Gardner, W. J. R., ed. (2000). The Evacuation from Dunkirk: 'Operation Dynamo' 26 May – 4 June 1940. London: Frank Cass. ISBN 0-7146-5120-6.
- Harris, Peter; Daynard, Don (1971). "Henry Wilcoxon" in The New Captain George's Whizzbang No. 13 (Vol.3 No.1). Toronto: Vast Whizzbang Organization.
- Wilcoxon, Henry; Orrison, Katherine (1991). Lionheart in Hollywood: the autobiography of Henry Wilcoxon. Metuchen, NJ and London: The Scarecrow Press, Inc. ISBN 0-8108-2476-0.
