= Prison Nurse =

1938 film by James Cruze

- Theatrical release poster
- Directed by: James Cruze
- Screenplay by: Earl Felton; Sidney Salkow
- Story by: Adele Buffington
- Based on: Prison Nurse by Louis Berg
- Produced by: Herman Schlom
- Starring: Henry Wilcoxon; Marian Marsh; Bernadene Hayes; Ben Welden; Ray Mayer; John Arledge
- Cinematography: Ernest Miller
- Edited by: William Morgan
- Music by: Alberto Colombo
- Production company: Republic Pictures
- Distributed by: Republic Pictures
- Release date: March 1, 1938
- Running time: 67 minutes
- Country: United States
- Language: English

Prison Nurse is a 1938 American drama film directed by James Cruze and written by Earl Felton and Sidney Salkow. It is based on the 1934 novel Prison Nurse by Louis Berg. The film stars Henry Wilcoxon, Marian Marsh, Bernadene Hayes, Ben Welden, Ray Mayer and John Arledge. The film was released on March 1, 1938, by Republic Pictures.

== Plot ==
A typhoid fever breaks out in a state prison and the prison's only doctor gets sick, there are only 3 nurses at the prison to administer vaccines and take care of the inmates, but some are planning to use the chaos to escape.

== Cast ==
- Henry Wilcoxon as Dale
- Marian Marsh as Judy
- Bernadene Hayes as Pepper Clancy
- Ben Welden as Gaffney
- Ray Mayer as Jackpot
- John Arledge as Mousie
- Addison Richards as Warden Benson
- Frank Reicher as Doctor Hartman
- Minerva Urecal as Sutherland
- Selmer Jackson as Parker
- Fred Kohler Jr. as Miller
- Norman Willis as Deputy
