= Richard Ney =

American actor

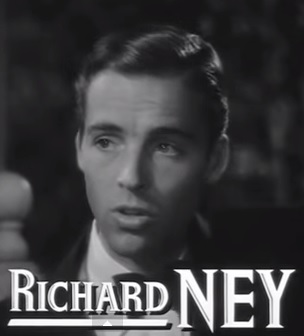
- Born: Richard Maximilian Ney; November 12, 1916; New York City, U.S.
- Died: July 18, 2004 (aged 87); Pasadena, California, U.S.
- Education: Columbia University
- Occupations: Actor, investment counselor
- Years active: 1942–1967
- Spouses: Marjorie Simons (m. 1937; div. 1939) Greer Garson (m. 1943; div. 1947) Pauline McMartin (m. 1949; div. 1970) Mei Lee (m. 1987)

Richard Maximilian Ney (November 12, 1916 – July 18, 2004) was an American actor, author, and investment counselor.

== Life and career ==
Ney was born in New York City, the son of Erwin Maximilian Ney (1893–1968), an insurance salesman, and Charlotte Marie Donaldson (1895–1966), who served in World War I as yeoman, first class, USNRF. Later she was a stenographer and a secretary at a lumberyard.

His parents' marriage ended in divorce and he grew up with his mother in humble circumstances. His father remarried twice. His father's third wife was Rebie Margaret Flood, a daughter of Rev. Theodore L. Flood, editor of The Chautauquan, and his wife, Ruth Crosley Pardington, daughter of A. R. Pardington.

A graduate in economics from Columbia University, Ney is best remembered for his role in the Oscar-winning World War II film Mrs. Miniver (1942), and for his short-lived (1943–47) marriage to co-star Greer Garson. He also appeared in Ivy (1947) and The Fan (1949). He was commissioned in the United States Navy serving in the Aleutians and the Pacific during World War II.

Ney's one Broadway venture was the 1958 musical Portofino, which he produced and for which he wrote the book and lyrics. It closed after three performances.

Ney performed mostly in television with occasional film roles until the mid-1960s. In "The Hunt" (January 27, 1962) of the NBC western television series, The Tall Man, Ney plays the wealthy Edward Van Doren, who hires Billy the Kid (Clu Gulager) to guide him into the wilderness to kill a mountain lion. However, Van Doren's real target is Billy himself.

== Investment career ==
By the middle 1960s, Ney had successfully transitioned himself into a career as an investment counselor. Initially he joined a Beverly Hills brokerage firm, prior to launching a newsletter, The Ney Report, whose subscribers included J. Paul Getty.

Ney wrote three highly critical books about Wall Street, asserting that the market was manipulated by market makers to the detriment of the average investor. The first of these, The Wall Street Jungle, was a New York Times bestseller in 1970. The second and third were The Wall Street Gang and Making It in the Market.

Ney was credited with saying, "Hidden behind the façade of pompous jargon and noble affections, there is more sheer larceny per square foot on the floor of the New York Stock Exchange than any place else in the world."

== Personal life ==
Ney was married four times:

- Marjorie Simons, who was a substitute art teacher in his high school. The couple married in New York City in 1937 and divorced in Reno, Nevada, in 1939.
- Greer Garson (1904–1996), married July 24, 1943, although the couple previously stated that the wedding would not take place until after the war ended. Ney and Garson divorced on September 25, 1947, the actress claiming that her husband was "morose and critical of her acting."
- Pauline Sears McMartin (1901–1986), a daughter of Colonel Douglas Settle, U.S. Army, and former wife of Canadian millionaire Duncan J. R. McMartin Sr. They wed on June 16, 1949. and divorced in 1970. She later married Clarence Dunbar. By this marriage Ney had one stepchild, Marcia McMartin Illing.
- Mei Lee (1987–2004; his death), a vice president in Ney's investment firm.

== Death ==
Ney was living in Pasadena, California when he died of a heart ailment while gardening in his yard.

== Filmography ==
Year	Title	Role	Notes
1942	Mrs. Miniver	Vin Miniver	
1942	The War Against Mrs. Hadley	Theodore Hadley	
1947	The Late George Apley	John Apley	
1947	Ivy	Jervis Hamilton Lexton	
1948	Joan of Arc	Charles de Bourbon, Duke de Clermont	
1949	The Fan	Mr. James Hopper	
1949	The Lovable Cheat	Jacques Minard	
1949	The Secret of St. Ives	Anatole de Keroual	
1950	My Beautiful Daughter	Massimo Lega	
1950	Un sourire dans la tempête	Sergeant James Spenlow	
1951	Ein Lächeln im Sturm	Sergeant James Spenlow	
1952	Babes in Bagdad	Ezar	
1960	Midnight Lace	Daniel Graham	
1962	The Premature Burial	Miles Archer	

== Books ==
- The Wall Street Jungle (1970)
- The Wall Street Gang (1974)
- Making It in the Market: Richard Ney's Low-Risk System for Stock Market Investors (1975)
