= Sherman Labby =

Sherman Labby (November 30, 1929, in Hollywood, California – May 31, 1998, in Los Angeles, California) was an American storyboard artist and production illustrator.

After many years as a magazine illustrator, and like many in his craft, his first motion-picture work was in animation at studios such as Filmation, Hanna-Barbera, and Marvel. He worked as a storyboard artist on such shows as Star Trek: The Animated Series, Groovie Goolies, The Batman/Superman Hour, The New Adventures of Batman, The New Adventures of Gilligan, The Secret Lives of Waldo Kitty, and Will the Real Jerry Lewis Please Sit Down, and the animated TV series of Journey to the Center of the Earth, Fantastic Voyage, and Godzilla.

His best-known live-action credits include Invasion of the Body Snatchers (1978), The Wanderers, The Incredible Shrinking Woman, Blade Runner, 2010, The Witches of Eastwick, Broadcast News, Lethal Weapon 2, The War of the Roses, Thelma & Louise, Bram Stoker's Dracula, Made in America, Free Willy, The Horse Whisperer, and What Dreams May Come.

From 1992 until his death from the effects of muscular dystrophy, he was married to author and film scholar Katherine Orrison.
