= Eoghan Ó Neachtain =

Irish writer

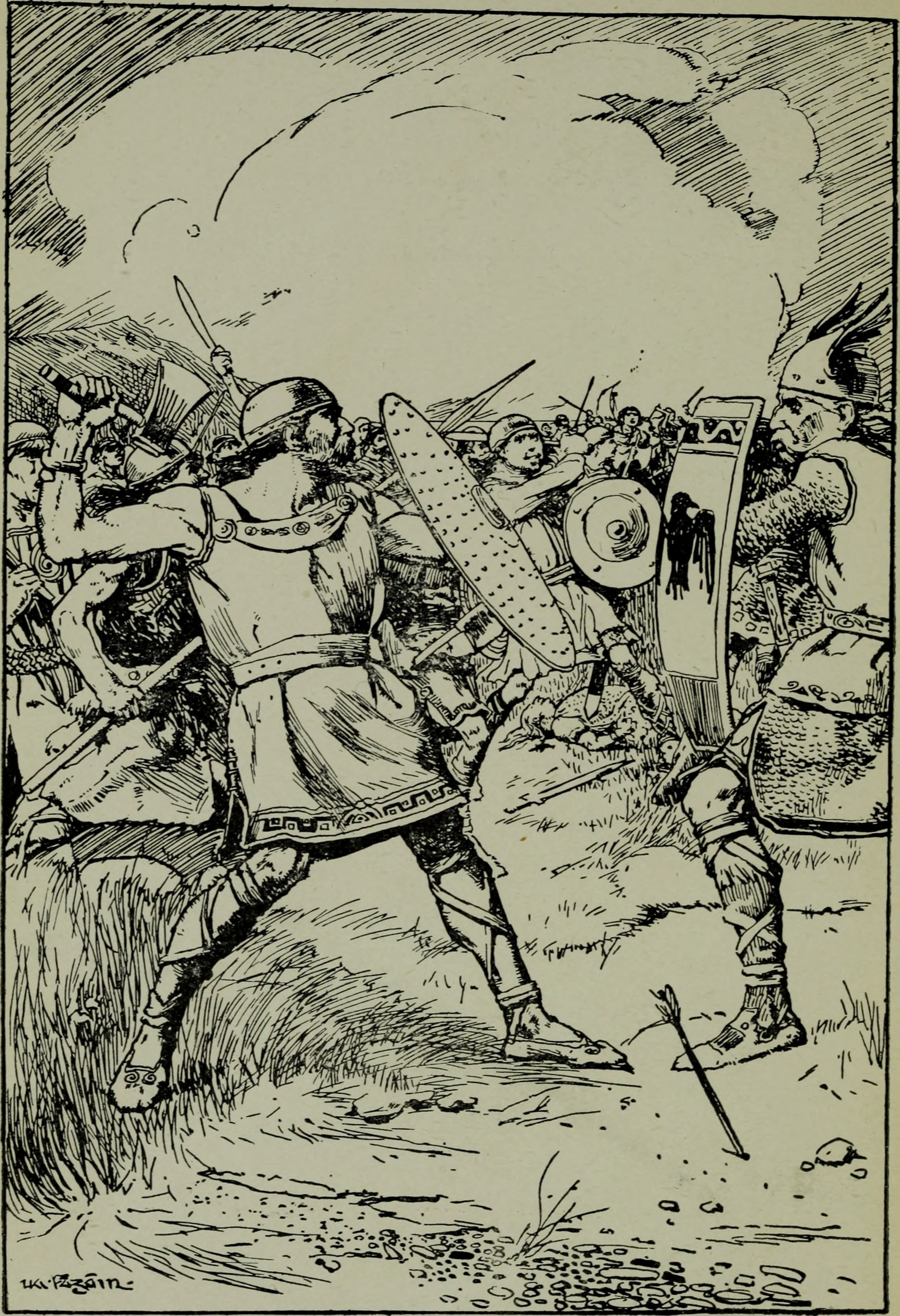
- Illustration from "Stair-ċeaċta. sgéalta gearra ar neiṫiḃ & ar ḋaoiniḃ i seanċas na hÉireann"
- Born: October 24, 1867; Park, An Spidéal
- Died: May 3, 1957 (aged 89)
- Writing career
- Language: Gaelic
- Notable works: Dubhaltach Mac Fhirbhisigh, maille le gluais agus focloir, I dtaoibh na hoibre, Stair-Cheachta, .i. scealta gearra ar neithibh agus ar dtaoinibh i Seanchas na hÉireann

Eoghan Ó Neachtain (24 October 1867 — 3 May 1957), Irish writer, fl. 1901–1932.

Ó Neachtain was born at Park, An Spidéal, in the late 19th century, and was a nationalist author associated with the Gaelic League and the Irish cultural revival. Almost all his published work was in the medium of the Irish language.

== Bibliography ==
- Dubhaltach Mac Fhirbhisigh, maille le gluais agus focloir, 1902.
- I dtaoibh na hoibre, 1901.
- Stair-cheachta, .i., sgéalta gearra ar neithibh & ar dhaoinibh i seanchas na hÉireann, I & II, 1905 and 1907.
- Scriobhnoiri na Gaedhilge, xiii, 1935.
- An Tiachóg, 1913.
- Céadtach mac Fhinn as Éirinn: Sean-sgéal ó Chois Fhairrge, 1907.
- Céimseata Eúclid, book one, 1908.
- Irisleabhar an Mhistealaigh, 1911.
- Irisleabhar Príosúin, nó chúig bhliadhna i bpríosúnaibh na Breataine, 1910 and 1911.
- Stair Éamuinn Uí Chléire: Do réir Sheáin Ui Neactain, 1918.
- Unga, 1930.
- An Liúdramán, 1932.
- Torolbh Mac Stairn do reir Mhicil Coimin, 1932.
- Tús na céimseatan, 1932.
