= Lorica (prayer) =

Irish monastic protective prayer

In the Irish (Hiberno-Scottish) monastic tradition, a lorica is a prayer recited for protection. It is essentially a 'protection prayer' in which the petitioner invokes all the power of God as a safeguard against evil in its many forms.

The Latin word lōrīca originally meant "armour" (body armor, in the sense of chainmail or cuirass). The idea underlying the name is probably derived from Ephesians 6:14, where Paul bids his readers stand, "having put on the breast-plate of righteousness,". The Greek word here translated as "breast-plate" is θώραξ, in the Vulgata version rendered lorica.

== Invocation ==
Similar to a litany, the lorica often listed whose protection was requested. "Gabriel be my breastplate, Michael be my belt, Raphael be my shield..."

Notable loricas include Rob tu mo bhoile, a Comdi cride, which in its English translation provides the text for the hymn Be Thou My Vision, the Lorica of Laidcenn, and the Lorica of Gildas.

Scholar of recent Scottish Gaelic literature Ronald Black has praised Father Allan MacDonald's work of Christian poetry Adhram Thu, Adhbhar Mo Bhith ("I Worship You, O Cause of My Being") as, "A powerful hymn of the St. Patrick's Breastplate type."

== Lorica of St Patrick ==
The Lorica of Saint Patrick, begins:

I arise today
Through a mighty strength, the invocation of the Trinity,
Through a belief in the Threeness,
Through confession of the Oneness
Of the Creator of creation.

Linguists cannot trace this lorica back further than the eighth century, which raises the question of whether it was based on an earlier poem dating back to the time of St. Patrick (fifth century), or whether it was actually completely unknown to the saint to whom it has been ascribed.

== Lorica of St Fursey (or Fursa) ==
The Lorica of St Fursa dates from the early seventh century and is still a popular prayer in Ireland. The original text of the Fursey Lorica is held in the British Library. The translation, from Old Irish and German, was made by Fr Francis Mullaghy CSSR and Fr Richard Tobin CSSR, for use in St Joseph's Monastery, Dundalk, County Louth. This Lorica translation is quoted by John Ó Ríordáin (3) and begins:

The arms of God be around my shoulders,
The touch of the Holy Spirit upon my head,
The sign of Christ’s cross upon my forehead,
The sound of the Holy Spirit in my ears,

== Caim ==
A "caim" is similar to a lorica, being a type of protection prayer. The word "caim" possibly derives from Scottish Gaelic as listed in the Carmina Gadelica meaning "loop, curve, circle, or sanctuary". English lexicographer Edward Dwelly's dictionary of Scottish Gaelic lists "sf Stain, blot, fault. 2(AC) Loop, curve, circle, sanctuary, guard, imaginary circle described with the hand round himself by a person in fear, danger or distress."

The Carmina Gadelica does not contain liturgical rubrics, nor is there a ritual action described that accompanies the prayer. However, one modern usage of a caim prayer involves the creation of an invisible circle around the self with the index finger while the individual turns round.

One prayer that is used can be found in the Carmina Gadelic with additions, and by tradition is often attributed to St. Columba:

Be to me a bright flame before me
Be to me a guiding star above me,
Be to me a smooth path below me,
Be to me a kind shepherd behind me,
Today, tonight, and forever.
