= Anthony Maxtone Graham =

Laird of Culloquhey

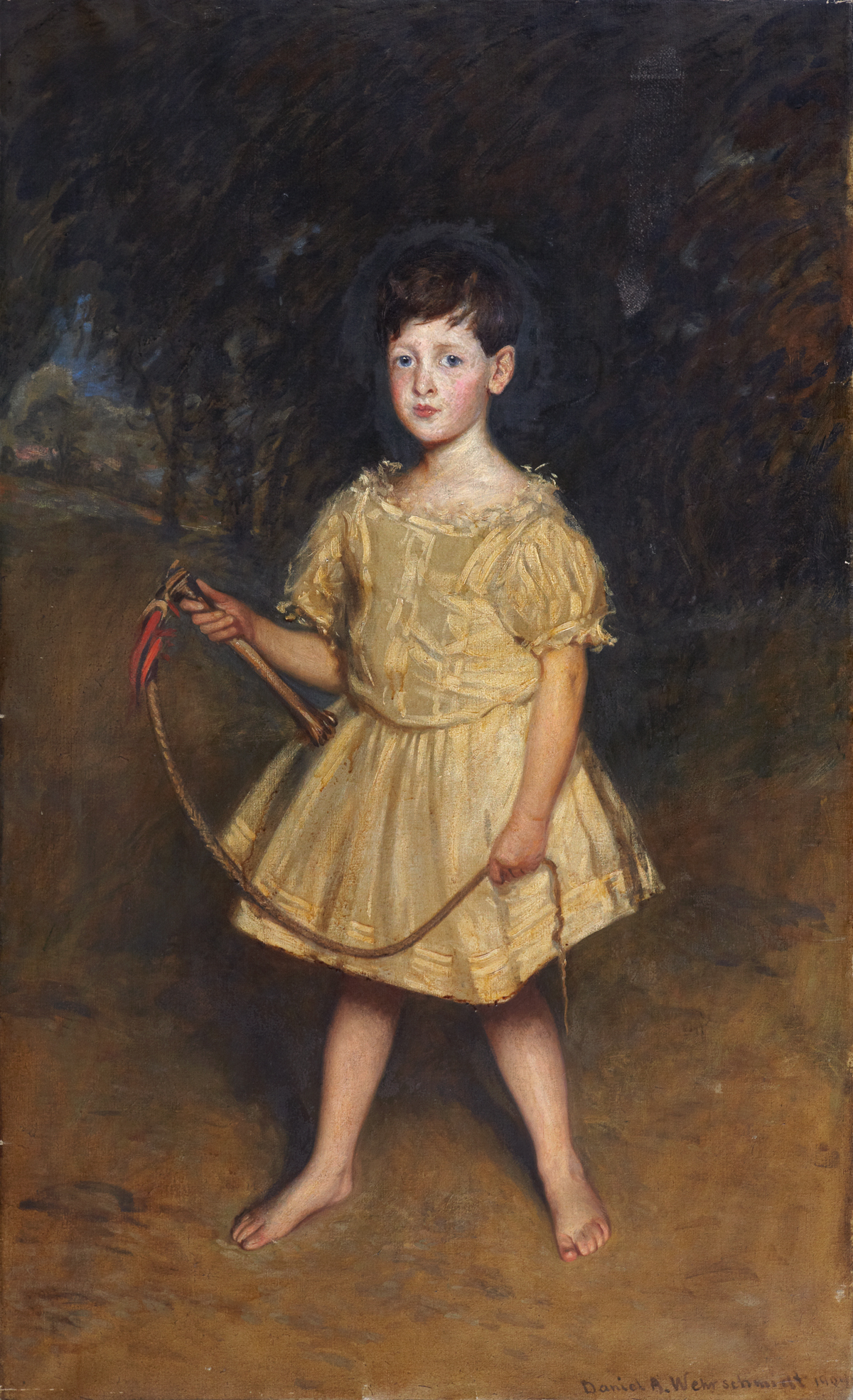
- Born: 1900
- Died: 1971 (aged 70–71)
- Spouse: Joyce Maxtone Graham
- Relatives: Ian Maxtone-Graham (great-nephew)

Anthony J. O. Maxtone Graham (1900–1971) was the 16th Laird of Culloquhey and 9th Laird of Redgorton and the co-founder of The Redfern Gallery in London in 1923.

A painting of Maxtone Graham by Daniel A. Wehrschmidt is in the City of Edinburgh Council art collection.
