= Brian Rice (artist) =

Brian Rice (born 1936) is a British abstract artist associated with the pop art movement who has had 35 solo exhibitions and around 200 group exhibitions.

Rice studied at Yeovil School of Art where he learned about printmaking and for a year Goldsmiths College. He was very active in London during the 1960s where he produced non-representational prints and paintings including his Japanese Series. He worked mostly in screen printing at this time.

During the 1970s Rice lived in the West of England and taught at Brighton Polytechnic. He developed an interest in the remains of ancient cultures which has influenced his work to the present.

Rice was chairman of the Printmakers Council of Great Britain 1974 - 1977. He has works in the collection of Tate Modern.
