= Jan Struther =

English writer, known for character Mrs. Miniver (1901–1953)

- Born: Joyce Anstruther; 6 June 1901
- Died: 20 July 1953 (aged 52)
- Spouses: Anthony Maxtone Graham (m. 1923; div. 1947) Adolf Placzek (m. 1948)
- Relatives: Ian Maxtone-Graham (great-nephew)
- Writing career
- Notable work: Mrs. Miniver

Jan Struther was the pen name of Joyce Anstruther, later Joyce Maxtone Graham and finally Joyce Placzek (6 June 1901 – 20 July 1953), an English writer remembered for her character Mrs. Miniver and a number of hymns, such as "Lord of All Hopefulness".

== Biography ==
She was the daughter of Henry Torrens Anstruther and Eva Anstruther and spent her childhood in Whitchurch in Buckinghamshire, England. She attended Miss Ironside's School in Kensington.

In 1923 she married Anthony Maxtone Graham, a broker at Lloyd's of London, with whom she had three children. This marriage eventually failed, and she started an affair with Adolf Placzek, a Viennese art historian 12 years her junior. She married him as her second husband, 5 years before her death.

Her final years were marked by severe depression, leading to a five-month stay in a psychiatric hospital. Following a mastectomy for breast cancer, she died of cancer in New York in 1953 at the age of 52. Her ashes are buried beside her father in the family grave at St. John The Evangelist Church, in Whitchurch.

Jan Struther is the great-aunt of Ian Maxtone-Graham, former co-executive producer of The Simpsons.

Struther is the subject of a biography, The Real Mrs. Miniver, written by her granddaughter, Ysenda Maxtone Graham.

== Literary career ==
In the 1930s she started to write for Punch magazine, and this brought her to the attention of The Times newspaper, where Peter Fleming asked her to write a series of columns for the paper, about "an ordinary sort of woman who leads an ordinary sort of life – rather like yourself". The resulting character that she created, Mrs Miniver, proved a huge success from the character's inception in 1937, and the columns were subsequently published in book form in 1939. On the outbreak of war, this book became the basis for a patriotic American film, Mrs Miniver, released in 1942, which won six Academy Awards, including Best Picture.

By 1942, Struther had herself gone to America as a lecturer. In the 1940s she was a frequent guest panellist on the popular American radio quiz show Information Please. She was one of the few women panellists to appear repeatedly on the program. An apocryphal story, attributed to fellow panellist Oscar Levant, tells that her appearances on the show stopped abruptly after she answered a question by referring to Agatha Christie's book Ten Little Niggers, which was the original British title of the book Ten Little Indians (later retitled And Then There Were None). However, the episode of Information Please in which Struther used the original Christie title in her answer to a listener question was in fact broadcast 7 February 1941, while the majority of Struther's appearances on the show (at least eight more occasions) occurred after this incident, through 29 January 1945.

As well as the creation of the character Mrs Miniver in a fortnightly column in The Times, she is remembered for her hymns for children, including "Lord of All Hopefulness", "When a Knight Won His Spurs" and "Daisies are Our Silver". These resulted from an approach by Canon Percy Dearmer of Westminster Abbey, Words Editor of the enlarged edition of Songs of Praise published in 1931 by OUP. She was an agnostic, although she did go to church.

She chose her pen name by combining her first initial, J, with her last name, Anstruther.

== See also ==
- The Queen's Book of the Red Cross
