= List of Big Five Academy Award winners and nominees =

At the Academy Awards, the so-called "Big Five" awards are those for Best Picture, Best Director, Best Actor, Best Actress, and Best Screenplay (either Best Original Screenplay or Best Adapted Screenplay). As of the 94th Academy Awards (2021), forty-three films have been nominated in all five of these award categories. Only three films have won all five of these major awards: It Happened One Night (1934), One Flew Over the Cuckoo's Nest (1975), and The Silence of the Lambs (1991). Eight films failed to win any of the five major awards after being nominated.

In addition, there are three film studios that have won all of the Big Five awards in the same year for two different films, while Everything Everywhere All at Once won the most "above-the-line" awards (includes Supporting Actor/Actress), with six.

== Films nominated for each of the "Big Five" awards ==
This list of films is sorted by the number of Big Five Academy Awards received by each film. Award winners are listed in bold with green background; others listed are nominees who did not win.

| Awards ceremony | Year in film | Total nominations | Total awards | Big Five awards | Best Picture | Best Director | Best Actor | Best Actress | Best Screenplay (A): Adapted Screenplay / (O): Original Screenplay | Notes |
|---|---|---|---|---|---|---|---|---|---|---|
| 7th | 1934 | 5 | 5 | 5 | **It Happened One Night** | **Frank Capra** | **Clark Gable** | **Claudette Colbert** | **Robert Riskin** (A) | |
| 48th | 1975 | 9 | 5 | 5 | **One Flew Over the Cuckoo's Nest** | **Miloš Forman** | **Jack Nicholson** | **Louise Fletcher** | **Lawrence Hauben** / **Bo Goldman** (A) | |
| 64th | 1991 | 7 | 5 | 5 | **The Silence of the Lambs** | **Jonathan Demme** | **Anthony Hopkins** | **Jodie Foster** | **Ted Tally** (A) | |
| 12th | 1939 | 13 | 8 | 4 | **Gone with the Wind** | **Victor Fleming** | Clark Gable | **Vivien Leigh** | **Sidney Howard** (A) | (Note: Gone With the Wind: Hattie McDaniel won for Best Supporting Actress. Olivia de Havilland was also nominated for Best Supporting Actress.) |
| 15th | 1942 | 12 | 6 | 4 | **Mrs. Miniver** | **William Wyler** | Walter Pidgeon | **Greer Garson** | **George Froeschel** / **James Hilton** / **Claudine West** / **Arthur Wimperis** (A) | (Note: Mrs. Miniver: Teresa Wright won for Best Supporting Actress. May Whitty was also nominated for Best Supporting Actress.) |
| 50th | 1977 | 5 | 4 | 4 | **Annie Hall** | **Woody Allen** | Woody Allen | **Diane Keaton** | **Woody Allen** / **Marshall Brickman** (O) | |
| 72nd | 1999 | 8 | 5 | 4 | **American Beauty** | **Sam Mendes** | **Kevin Spacey** | Annette Bening | **Alan Ball** (O) | |
| 26th | 1953 | 13 | 8 | 3 | **From Here to Eternity** | **Fred Zinnemann** | Montgomery Clift / Burt Lancaster | Deborah Kerr | **Daniel Taradash** (A) | (Note: From Here to Eternity: Frank Sinatra won for Best Supporting Actor. Donna Reed won for Best Supporting Actress. This film received six nominations in the Big Five Categories; two actors (Montgomery Clift and Burt Lancaster) were each nominated for Best Actor.) |
| 33rd | 1960 | 10 | 5 | 3 | **The Apartment** | **Billy Wilder** | Jack Lemmon | Shirley MacLaine | **Billy Wilder** / **I. A. L. Diamond** (O) | |
| 49th | 1976 | 10 | 4 | 3 | Network | Sidney Lumet | **Peter Finch** / William Holden | **Faye Dunaway** | **Paddy Chayefsky** (O) | (Note: Network: Beatrice Straight won for Best Supporting Actress. Ned Beatty was nominated for Best Supporting Actor. This film received six nominations in the Big Five Categories; two actors (Peter Finch and William Holden) were each nominated for Best Actor.) |
| 51st | 1978 | 8 | 3 | 3 | Coming Home | Hal Ashby | **Jon Voight** | **Jane Fonda** | **Robert C. Jones** / **Waldo Salt** / **Nancy Dowd** (O) | |
| 54th | 1981 | 10 | 3 | 3 | On Golden Pond | Mark Rydell | **Henry Fonda** | **Katharine Hepburn** | **Ernest Thompson** (A) | |
| 77th | 2004 | 7 | 4 | 3 | **Million Dollar Baby** | **Clint Eastwood** | Clint Eastwood | **Hilary Swank** | Paul Haggis (A) | (Note: Million Dollar Baby: Morgan Freeman won for Best Supporting Actor.) |
| 4th | 1930–31 | 7 | 3 | 2 | **Cimarron** | Wesley Ruggles | Richard Dix | Irene Dunne | **Howard Estabrook** (A) | |
| 13th | 1940 | 6 | 2 | 2 | The Philadelphia Story | George Cukor | **James Stewart** | Katharine Hepburn | **Donald Ogden Stewart** (A) | |
| 20th | 1947 | 8 | 3 | 2 | **Gentleman's Agreement** | **Elia Kazan** | Gregory Peck | Dorothy McGuire | Moss Hart (A) | |
| 24th | 1951 | 9 | 6 | 2 | A Place in the Sun | **George Stevens** | Montgomery Clift | Shelley Winters | **Harry Brown** / **Michael Wilson** (A) | |
| 27th | 1954 | 7 | 2 | 2 | The Country Girl | George Seaton | Bing Crosby | **Grace Kelly** | **George Seaton** (A) | |
| 32nd | 1959 | 6 | 2 | 2 | Room at the Top | Jack Clayton | Laurence Harvey | **Simone Signoret** | **Neil Paterson** (A) | |
| 40th | 1967 | 10 | 2 | 2 | Guess Who's Coming to Dinner | Stanley Kramer | Spencer Tracy | **Katharine Hepburn** | **William Rose** (O) | (Note: Guess Who's Coming to Dinner: Cecil Kellaway was nominated for Best Supporting Actor. Beah Richards was nominated for Best Supporting Actress.) |
| 41st | 1968 | 7 | 3 | 2 | The Lion in Winter | Anthony Harvey | Peter O'Toole | **Katharine Hepburn** | **James Goldman** (A) | |
| 49th | 1976 | 10 | 3 | 2 | **Rocky** | **John G. Avildsen** | Sylvester Stallone | Talia Shire | Sylvester Stallone (O) | |
| 69th | 1996 | 12 | 9 | 2 | **The English Patient** | **Anthony Minghella** | Ralph Fiennes | Kristin Scott Thomas | Anthony Minghella (A) | (Note: The English Patient: Juliette Binoche won for Best Supporting Actress.) |
| 89th | 2016 | 14 | 6 | 2 | La La Land | **Damien Chazelle** | Ryan Gosling | **Emma Stone** | Damien Chazelle (O) | |
| 10th | 1937 | 7 | 1 | 1 | A Star Is Born | William A. Wellman | Fredric March | Janet Gaynor | **William A. Wellman** / **Robert Carson** / **Dorothy Parker** / **Alan Campbell** (O) | |
| 12th | 1939 | 7 | 1 | 1 | Goodbye, Mr. Chips | Sam Wood | **Robert Donat** | Greer Garson | R. C. Sherriff, Claudine West, and Eric Maschwitz (A) | |
| 13th | 1940 | 11 | 2 | 1 | **Rebecca** | Alfred Hitchcock | Laurence Olivier | Joan Fontaine | Robert E. Sherwood / Joan Harrison (A) | |
| 21st | 1948 | 12 | 1 | 1 | Johnny Belinda | Jean Negulesco | Lew Ayres | **Jane Wyman** | Irma von Cube / Allen Vincent (A) | |
| 23rd | 1950 | 11 | 3 | 1 | Sunset Boulevard | Billy Wilder | William Holden | Gloria Swanson | **Charles Brackett** / **Billy Wilder** / **D. M. Marshman, Jr.** (O) | (Note: Sunset Boulevard: Erich von Stroheim was nominated for Best Supporting Actor. Nancy Olson was nominated for Best Supporting Actress.) |
| 24th | 1951 | 12 | 4 | 1 | A Streetcar Named Desire | Elia Kazan | Marlon Brando | **Vivien Leigh** | Tennessee Williams (A) | (Note: A Streetcar Named Desire: Karl Malden won for Best Supporting Actor. Kim Hunter won for Best Supporting Actress.) |
| 39th | 1966 | 13 | 5 | 1 | Who's Afraid of Virginia Woolf? | Mike Nichols | Richard Burton | **Elizabeth Taylor** | Ernest Lehman (A) | (Note: Who's Afraid of Virginia Woolf?: Sandy Dennis won for Best Supporting Actress. George Segal was nominated for Best Supporting Actor.) |
| 40th | 1967 | 7 | 1 | 1 | The Graduate | **Mike Nichols** | Dustin Hoffman | Anne Bancroft | Calder Willingham / Buck Henry (A) | |
| 47th | 1974 | 11 | 1 | 1 | Chinatown | Roman Polanski | Jack Nicholson | Faye Dunaway | **Robert Towne** (O) | |
| 54th | 1981 | 12 | 3 | 1 | Reds | **Warren Beatty** | Warren Beatty | Diane Keaton | Warren Beatty / Trevor Griffiths (O) | (Note: Reds: Maureen Stapleton won for Best Supporting Actress. Jack Nicholson was nominated for Best Supporting Actor.) |
| 85th | 2012 | 8 | 1 | 1 | Silver Linings Playbook | David O. Russell | Bradley Cooper | **Jennifer Lawrence** | David O. Russell (A) | (Note: Silver Linings Playbook: Robert de Niro was nominated for Best Supporting Actor. Jackie Weaver was nominated for Best Supporting Actress.) |
| 31st | 1958 | 7 | 0 | 0 | Cat on a Hot Tin Roof | Richard Brooks | Paul Newman | Elizabeth Taylor | Richard Brooks / James Poe (A) | |
| 34th | 1961 | 9 | 2 | 0 | The Hustler | Robert Rossen | Paul Newman | Piper Laurie | Sidney Carroll / Robert Rossen (A) | |
| 40th | 1967 | 10 | 2 | 0 | Bonnie and Clyde | Arthur Penn | Warren Beatty | Faye Dunaway | David Newman / Robert Benton (O) | (Note: Bonnie and Clyde: Estelle Parsons won for Best Supporting Actress. Gene Hackman and Michael J. Pollard were both nominated for Best Supporting Actor.) |
| 43rd | 1970 | 7 | 1 | 0 | Love Story | Arthur Hiller | Ryan O'Neal | Ali MacGraw | Erich Segal (A) | |
| 47th | 1974 | 6 | 0 | 0 | Lenny | Bob Fosse | Dustin Hoffman | Valerie Perrine | Julian Barry (A) | |
| 54th | 1981 | 5 | 0 | 0 | Atlantic City | Louis Malle | Burt Lancaster | Susan Sarandon | John Guare (O) | |
| 66th | 1993 | 8 | 0 | 0 | The Remains of the Day | James Ivory | Anthony Hopkins | Emma Thompson | Ruth Prawer Jhabvala (A) | |
| 86th | 2013 | 10 | 0 | 0 | American Hustle | David O. Russell | Christian Bale | Amy Adams | Eric Warren Singer / David O. Russell (O) | (Note: American Hustle: Bradley Cooper was nominated for Best Supporting Actor. Jennifer Lawrence was nominated for Best Supporting Actress.) |

== Studio winners across two films ==
This is a list of film studios that have produced two films which, combined, have a winner in each of the Big Five Academy Awards categories.

| Awards ceremony | Year in film | Film studios | Big Five awards | Best Picture | Best Director | Best Actor | Best Actress | Best Screenplay (A): Adapted Screenplay / (O): Original Screenplay | Notes |
|---|---|---|---|---|---|---|---|---|---|
| 12th | 1939 | Metro-Goldwyn-Mayer & Loew's Inc | 5 total 4 (Gone with the Wind) + 1 (Goodbye, Mr. Chips) | Gone with the Wind | Victor Fleming (Gone with the Wind) | Robert Donat (Goodbye, Mr. Chips) | Vivien Leigh (Gone with the Wind) | Sidney Howard (A) (Gone with the Wind) | |
| 49th | 1976 | United Artists | 5 total 3 (Network) + 2 (Rocky) | Rocky | John G. Avildsen (Rocky) | Peter Finch (Network) | Faye Dunaway (Network) | Paddy Chayefsky (O) (Network) | |
| 95th | 2022 | A24 | 5 total 4 (Everything Everywhere All at Once) + 1 (The Whale) | Everything Everywhere All at Once | Daniel Kwan and Daniel Scheinert (Everything Everywhere All at Once) | Brendan Fraser (The Whale) | Michelle Yeoh (Everything Everywhere All at Once) | Daniel Kwan and Daniel Scheinert (O) (Everything Everywhere All at Once) | |

== Milestones and records ==
- David O. Russell, Billy Wilder, Elia Kazan, and Mike Nichols are the only directors with two movies on this list.
- Nine actors appear twice on this list as Best Actor nominees: Anthony Hopkins, Burt Lancaster, Clark Gable, Dustin Hoffman, Jack Nicholson, Montgomery Clift, Paul Newman, Warren Beatty and William Holden.
- Four actresses appear twice on this list as Best Actress nominees: Vivien Leigh, Elizabeth Taylor, Greer Garson, and Diane Keaton. Faye Dunaway appears three times, while Katharine Hepburn appears four times.
- Billy Wilder, David O. Russell, and Claudine West are the only screenwriters with two screenplays on this list.
- Eight directors also wrote the screenplays of their movies: Billy Wilder, David O. Russell, Damien Chazelle, Anthony Minghella, George Seaton, Richard Brooks, Robert Rossen and William A. Wellman.
- Sylvester Stallone is credited for writing and acting in Rocky. Clint Eastwood is credited for directing and acting in Million Dollar Baby. Warren Beatty and Woody Allen were each credited for acting, writing, and directing their respective movies on the list.
- Network and From Here to Eternity each had six nominations in the "Big Five"; both extra nominations were for Best Actor.
- The ceremonies with the most "Big Five"-nominated films were the 40th and 54th with three films each. Other ceremonies with multiple "Big Five" nominees are the 12th, 13th, 24th, 47th, and 49th, each with two films.

== Films nominated for and winning four ==
These films won all four of their nominations for the Big Five Academy Awards. The list is sorted chronologically.

| Awards ceremony | Year in film | Total nominations | Total awards | Best Picture | Best Director | Best Actor | Best Actress | Best Screenplay (A): Adapted Screenplay / (O): Original Screenplay | Notes |
|---|---|---|---|---|---|---|---|---|---|
| 17th | 1944 | 10 | 7 | Going My Way | Leo McCarey | Bing Crosby | - | Frank Butler / Frank Cavett (A) | |
| 18th | 1945 | 7 | 4 | The Lost Weekend | Billy Wilder | Ray Milland | - | Charles Brackett / Billy Wilder (A) | |
| 19th | 1946 | 8 | 7 | The Best Years of Our Lives | William Wyler | Fredric March | - | Robert E. Sherwood (A) | |
| 27th | 1954 | 12 | 8 | On the Waterfront | Elia Kazan | Marlon Brando | - | Budd Schulberg (O) | |
| 28th | 1955 | 8 | 4 | Marty | Delbert Mann | Ernest Borgnine | - | Paddy Chayefsky (A) | |
| 30th | 1957 | 8 | 7 | The Bridge on the River Kwai | David Lean | Alec Guinness | - | Michael Wilson / Carl Foreman / Pierre Boulle (A) | |
| 39th | 1966 | 8 | 6 | A Man for All Seasons | Fred Zinnemann | Paul Scofield | - | Robert Bolt (A) | |
| 43rd | 1970 | 10 | 7 | Patton | Franklin J. Schaffner | George C. Scott | - | Francis Ford Coppola / Edmund H. North (O) | |
| 44th | 1971 | 8 | 5 | The French Connection | William Friedkin | Gene Hackman | - | Ernest Tidyman (A) | |
| 52nd | 1979 | 9 | 5 | Kramer vs. Kramer | Robert Benton | Dustin Hoffman | - | Robert Benton (A) | |
| 55th | 1982 | 11 | 8 | Gandhi | Richard Attenborough | Ben Kingsley | - | John Briley (O) | |
| 56th | 1983 | 11 | 5 | Terms of Endearment | James L. Brooks | - | Shirley MacLaine | James L. Brooks (A) | Debra Winger was also nominated for Best Actress |
| 57th | 1984 | 11 | 8 | Amadeus | Miloš Forman | F. Murray Abraham | - | Peter Shaffer (A) | Tom Hulce was also nominated for Best Actor |
| 61st | 1988 | 8 | 4 | Rain Man | Barry Levinson | Dustin Hoffman | - | Ronald Bass / Barry Morrow (O) | |
| 67th | 1994 | 13 | 6 | Forrest Gump | Robert Zemeckis | Tom Hanks | - | Eric Roth (A) | |
| 83rd | 2010 | 12 | 4 | The King's Speech | Tom Hooper | Colin Firth | - | David Seidler (O) | |
| 95th | 2022 | 11 | 7 | Everything Everywhere All at Once | Daniel Kwan and Daniel Scheinert | - | Michelle Yeoh | Daniel Kwan and Daniel Scheinert (O) | |
| 97th | 2024 | 6 | 5 | Anora | Sean Baker | - | Mikey Madison | Sean Baker (O) | |

== Above-the-line awards ==
List of films with the most "above-the-line" Academy Awards—that is, the "Big Five" + Supporting Acting. Everything Everywhere All at Once (2022) holds the record with six "above-the-line" awards, while eleven other films have received five. The list is sorted chronologically.

| Awards ceremony | Year in film | Total nominations | Total awards | Total above-the-line awards | Best Picture | Best Director | Best Actor (M) / Best Actress (F) | Best Supporting Actor (M) / Supporting Actress (F) | Best Adapted Screenplay (A) / Best Original Screenplay (O) | Notes |
|---|---|---|---|---|---|---|---|---|---|---|
| 7th | 1934 | 5 | 5 | 5 | It Happened One Night | Frank Capra | Clark Gable (M) / Claudette Colbert (F) | — | Robert Riskin (A) | |
| 12th | 1939 | 13 | 8 | 5 | Gone with the Wind | Victor Fleming | Vivien Leigh (F) | Hattie McDaniel (F) | Sidney Howard (A) | Clark Gable and Olivia de Havilland were also nominated for Actor and Supporting Actress, respectively |
| 15th | 1942 | 12 | 6 | 5 | Mrs. Miniver | William Wyler | Greer Garson (F) | Teresa Wright (F) | George Froeschel / James Hilton / Claudine West / Arthur Wimperis (A) | Walter Pidgeon, Henry Travers, and May Whitty were also nominated for Actor, Supporting Actor, and Supporting Actress, respectively |
| 17th | 1944 | 10 | 7 | 5 | Going My Way | Leo McCarey | Bing Crosby (M) | Barry Fitzgerald (M) | Frank Butler / Frank Cavett (A) | Barry Fitzgerald was also nominated for Actor, for the same performance (Note: Going My Way: Barry Fitzgerald was nominated for both Best Actor and Best Supporting Actor for the same role in Going My Way; he won the latter award, losing the former to his co-star, Bing Crosby. The Academy subsequently amended its rules to prevent such recurrences.) |
| 26th | 1953 | 13 | 8 | 5 | From Here to Eternity | Fred Zinnemann | Montgomery Clift and Burt Lancaster (M) / Deborah Kerr (F) | Frank Sinatra (M) / Donna Reed (F) | Daniel Taradash (A) | |
| 19th | 1946 | 8 | 7 | 5 | The Best Years of Our Lives | William Wyler | Fredric March (M) | Harold Russell (M) | Robert E. Sherwood (A) | |
| 27th | 1954 | 12 | 8 | 5 | On the Waterfront | Elia Kazan | Marlon Brando (M) | Eva Marie Saint (F) | Budd Schulberg (O) | Lee J. Cobb, Karl Malden, and Rod Steiger were also nominated for Best Supporting Actor |
| 48th | 1975 | 9 | 5 | 5 | One Flew Over the Cuckoo's Nest | Miloš Forman | Jack Nicholson (M) / Louise Fletcher (F) | Brad Dourif (M) | Lawrence Hauben / Bo Goldman (A) | |
| 52nd | 1979 | 9 | 5 | 5 | Kramer vs. Kramer | Robert Benton | Dustin Hoffman (M) | Meryl Streep (F) | Robert Benton (A) | Justin Henry and Jane Alexander were also nominated for Supporting Actor and Supporting Actress, respectively |
| 56th | 1983 | 11 | 5 | 5 | Terms of Endearment | James L. Brooks | Shirley MacLaine (F) | Jack Nicholson (M) | James L. Brooks (A) | Debra Winger and John Lithgow were also nominated for Actress and Supporting Actor, respectively |
| 64th | 1991 | 7 | 5 | 5 | The Silence of the Lambs | Jonathan Demme | Anthony Hopkins (M) / Jodie Foster (F) | — | Ted Tally (A) | |
| 95th | 2022 | 11 | 7 | 6 | Everything Everywhere All at Once | Daniel Kwan and Daniel Scheinert | Michelle Yeoh (F) | Ke Huy Quan (M) / Jamie Lee Curtis (F) | Daniel Kwan and Daniel Scheinert (O) | Stephanie Hsu was also nominated for Supporting Actress |

== See also ==
- List of films with all four Academy Award acting nominations
- List of films with two or more Academy Awards in an acting category
