= Random Harvest =

1941 novel by James Hilton

- First edition
- Author: James Hilton
- Language: English
- Genre: War novel
- Publisher: Macmillan
- Publication date: December 1941
- Publication place: United Kingdom
- Media type: Print (hardback & paperback)
- ISBN: 0-333-02681-0

Random Harvest is a novel written by James Hilton, first published in 1941. Like previous Hilton works, including Lost Horizon and Goodbye, Mr. Chips, the novel was immensely popular, placing second on Publishers Weekly list of best-selling novels for the year, and it was published as an Armed Services Edition during the Second World War.

The novel was successfully adapted into a film of the same name in 1942 under the direction of Mervyn LeRoy. Claudine West, George Froeschel and Arthur Wimperis adapted the novel for the screen, and received an Academy Award nomination for their work. Though the film departs from the novel's narrative in several significant ways, the novel's surprise ending, cleverly built on inferences drawn by the reader, would not work in a visual medium.

== Plot summary ==
The novel is divided, not into chapters, but five large parts.

It is set in the period immediately after the outbreak of the first World War. It is told in the first person by Harrison, and by means of two extended external analepses tells the story of Charles Rainier, a wealthy businessman and politician, from the time he was invalided out of the army during the war, his subsequent memory loss and partial recovery, his assuming control of the family business to his attempts to recover his memory just as Hitler invades Poland.

The book is prefaced with this quote: '..German Official Report: "According to a British Official report, bombs fell at Random"'. The novel starts in 1937, and is narrated by Charles Rainier's secretary, Mr. Harrison. Charles and Mrs. Rainier ("Helen" in the novel) reside at Stourton, their country manor west of London, where she is the perfect hostess, and a young man named Woburn has been hired to catalogue the family library. One night Rainier recounts his story to Harrison, from the time he woke up in Liverpool in 1919, having lost two years of his life.

Rainier's tale is told in the form of the third person (although Harrison is recounting it) and relates his return to Stourton, where he learns his father is gravely ill. Told by the doctor that the shock of his return could be fatal to his father, Charles decides to leave his home to lessen the risk to his father, despite the fact that the family lawyer insists on telling the senior Mr. Rainier so he can change his will back and include Charles, who had been assumed dead. Shortly afterwards, Charles receives word that his father has died and returns home. The family gathers to pay their last respects, and included is 14-year-old Kitty, stepdaughter of Charles' elder sister Jill. Prompted by the family lawyer, each of the Rainier heirs agrees to give up a portion of their inheritance to Charles, so he may have an equal share. Under the poor leadership of Charles' older brother Chetwynd (Chet), Rainier shares dwindle in worth until Charles has to take control of the company to save it from bankruptcy. He takes leave from university (where he had resumed his studies which had been interrupted by war) and throws himself into work. He saves the family business, but at the price of his own scholarly aspirations. In due course, he and Kitty become engaged. But before their wedding, he receives a note from Kitty breaking off the engagement, and telling him she is going abroad.

Rainier goes on to disclose to Harrison that Kitty was to die soon after. Meantime, war is on the horizon, and Harrison and Rainier spend time together going to music halls and working. On a lark, they go see an old-fashioned vaudeville show, and something about it sparks a vague memory in Rainier. He starts to remember things, including being in a hospital in Melbury, a north London outer suburb. He and Harrison drive there, where he finds the asylum he was in during the final days of the First World War.

The encounter causes Rainier's memory to flood back. He remembers his life in the hospital, where he had been deposited after being released from a German prison hospital as an unknown soldier. Escaping from the asylum as the end of the Great War is being celebrated, he goes into Melbury, where he is rescued by a young woman just as he is on the point of being reported. Feeling poorly, he is helped by the young woman – Paula Ridgeway – to a nearby hotel, The Owl, where she is staying. Now assigned the pseudonym of 'Smith', he takes on odd jobs at the hotel, guarded by 'Biffer', the ex-boxer and landlord. It is not long before his whereabouts become known to the hospital. Although Paula sends him away before he is caught, they soon meet up again at a revue in which she is appearing. She arranges a job with the travelling troupe of actors, and they grow closer. After an abortive stage appearance of his own and a brief resumption of his mental illness in which he assaults a man in the street, 'Smith' escapes to a small village named Beachings Over. Paula easily tracks him down, however, and aware that the authorities may still be pursuing him after the assault, they move to London, where they are befriended by Blampied, a kindly parson. 'Smith' and Paula marry and Smith starts to help the parson in his work. Smith discovers a flair for writing, and Blampied, knowing the editor of a newspaper in Liverpool, sends some of Smith's writings to him. Impressed, the editor asks 'Smith' to come and see him. 'Smith' arrives in Liverpool, but slips whilst crossing the street in the rain and is knocked unconscious.

These recollections prompt Rainier to become more determined than ever to find out what happened after his blackout in Liverpool, above all to locate Paula. He goes off to search and Harrison returns to the Rainier home, where he encounters Mrs. Rainier. He outlines what has taken place. She takes Harrison for a drive, then "threaded the winding gravel roads over the estate to an exit I had not known of before..." They wind up in Beachings Over and spot Rainier's car. Mrs. Rainier and Harrison find Charles up on a hillside. The closing line reveals that Mrs. Rainier is in fact Paula.

== Differences from the film ==
The film, unlike the novel, does not employ flashbacks. The narrative begins in 1918, when the patient simply called Smith is in the asylum. The viewer first encounters Paula in this context as his rescuer, and so is well aware of her identity throughout the film.

Rainier meets Paula for the second time some time after 1920, having recovered his original memories, but having lost the memory of his years as Smith, her husband. She identifies herself to him as Margaret Hansen, and becomes his trusted private secretary, later entering into a non-romantic, platonic marriage with him. Her motives and anxieties are revealed to the audience through discussions with Dr. Jonathan Benet, Smith's psychiatrist from the asylum, a character original to the film. He cautions her that she must not reveal her true identity to Rainier, that he must recover his memories, if he's going to, spontaneously.

Thus, at the end of the film, it is only to Charles Rainier / Smithy that Paula's true identity is revealed, and there is never any uncertainty that she is his lost love.

Kitty does not die in the film. Rainier's father is already deceased when he returns to Random Hall, and, after 1920 when he recovers his memories, few specific dates or historical events are given. We know only that enough years have passed for Kitty to graduate from university, and for Rainier to become ensconced in the business world. We know that when Margaret has John Smith declared dead it has been 12 years since he disappeared, making 1932 the year of Charles' election and their marriage. Margaret decides to go away on their third anniversary, so the film ends in 1935, untouched by World War II.

== Major themes ==
The novel is set in the years immediately following World War I, when shellshock—a term invented to describe the devastating effects of life in the trenches and exposure to concussive explosions on survivors of that war—was a matter of great concern. The stigma of cowardice clung to many sufferers. The name was changed to combat stress reaction in World War II, which was being fought as the novel was written.

A theme common to this and James Hilton's other novels is lost innocence – here, the destructive effects of two world wars on England – and a concomitant yearning to return to apparently simpler times. Charles Rainier's complex, pressure-filled business and political life and his outward sophistication are contrasted with the happy simplicity of his time with Paula; similarly stark contrasts are drawn between the grimness of London and the idyll of Beachings Over. Hilton draws parallels between Rainier's ability to sense impending doom but inability to do anything about it and British governmental paralysis in responding to Hitler's manoeuvres preceding the outbreak of the Second World War.

== Adaptations ==
The novel was made into a film in 1942, directed by Mervyn LeRoy. Claudine West, George Froeschel and Arthur Wimperis adapted the novel for the screen. The film starred Ronald Colman and Greer Garson in the lead roles.

Colman and Garson reprised their roles in a radio version on the Lux Radio Theater, airing 31 January 1944.

Takarazuka Revue, an all-female opera company in Japan, adopted the novel into a musical play in 1992, starring Mira Anju.

The 1942 film version was spoofed on The Carol Burnett Show as "Rancid Harvest" (Season 6, Ep 24, 24 March 1973) with Carol Burnett decked out in a red plaid cape and tam-o-shanter as Greer Garson (Paula) desperately trying to jog the memory of Harvey Korman as Ronald Colman (Charles Rainier).

The novel was adapted into an Egyptian film in 1946 called "The Unknown Past" الماضي المجهول, starring Leila Mourad and Ahmed Salem (also director).
