= Amardeep (1958 film) =

1958 film

Amar Deep
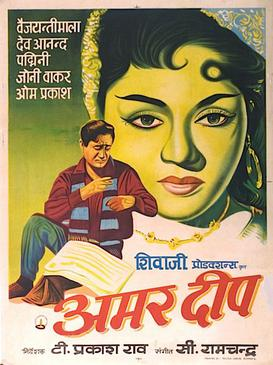
- Directed by: T. Prakash Rao
- Written by: Rajendra Krishan
- Screenplay by: T. Prakash Rao
- Story by: C. V. Sridhar (adapted); James Hilton (original)
- Based on: Amara Deepam (1956 Tamil film); Random Harverst (1942 American film) + Random Harvest (1941 novel) by James Hilton
- Produced by: S. Krishnamurthy; P. N. Pillai
- Starring: Dev Anand; Vyjayanthimala; Padmini
- Cinematography: A. Vincent
- Edited by: N. M. Shankar
- Music by: C. Ramchandra
- Distributed by: Sivaji Productions
- Release date: 1958
- Country: India
- Language: Hindi

Amar Deep (transl. The Eternal Lamp) is a 1958 Indian Hindi-language romantic drama film directed by T. Prakash Rao, under Sivaji Productions. The film stars Dev Anand, Vyjayanthimala, Padmini, Ragini, Johnny Walker, Pran, Om Prakash. The film's music was composed by C. Ramchandra. It is a remake of Rao's 1956 Tamil film Amara Deepam, based on the 1942 American film Random Harvest which had earlier been adapted in Bengali as Harano Sur (1957).

== Plot ==
The movie story deals with Aruna who lives a wealthy lifestyle with her grandfather. She has come of marriageable age and he wants her to marry a young man named Pran. But Aruna finds him possessive, controlling, and hot-tempered, and will not have anything to do with him, so she decides to run away. Her father, who falls deeply ill, asks Pran to search everywhere for her, and Pran takes an oath that he will not return home until he finds her. When Aruna was away from home, she meets an young man named Ashok, who is jobless but has a good heart and they both fall in love with each other. One day, when they were going for a walk, Pran finds Aruna and drags her back home. Ashok runs after Aruna but gets into an accident causing him to lose his memory. Shortly thereafter, her father's health gets complicated and passes away, leaving her in the care of Pran and a servant named Hariya. When Pran offers to marry her, she refuses and tells him that she loves Ashok. Ashok, who doesn't even remember his name, saves the life of a street dancer named Roopa and they fall in love. One day, Roopa and her family of street dancers along with Ashok perform in front of Aruna's house. Aruna recognizes Ashok but he doesn't recognize her which makes her very sad and heartbroken. The rest of the story gets complicated when Ashok gets his memory back and remembers Aruna and forgets Roopa who turns out to Meena's (now Aruna's) elder sister and is shot by Pran in a rescue attempt of Aruna who is kidnapped by Pran.

== Cast ==
- Dev Anand as Ashok
- Vyjayanthimala as Meena / Aruna
- Padmini as Roopa
- Ragini as Champa
- Johnny Walker as Ustad
- Pran as Pran
- David as Meena and Roopa's Father
- Bipin Gupta as Meena's Foster Grandfather
- Mukri as Lalli
- Shivraj as Hariya
- Om Prakash as Conned Man
- Anwar Hussain as Conman
- Randhir

== Soundtrack ==
Music was by C. Ramchandra. Lyrics for all songs were written by Rajinder Krishan.

Song	Singer	Raga
"Dil Ki Duniya Basake"	Lata Mangeshkar	
"Mere Man Ka Bawra"	Lata Mangeshkar	Bhimpalasi
"Lagi Apni Najariya"	Asha Bhosle	
"Kisi Din Zara Dekh"	Asha Bhosle	
"Yeh Ji Chahta Hai"	Asha Bhosle	
"Jali Lo Dim Tana"	Asha Bhosle	
"Dekh Hamen Awaz Na Dena, O Bedard Zamane" - 1	Asha Bhosle, Mohammed Rafi	
"Dekh Hamen Awaz Na Dena, O Bedard Zamane" - 2	Asha Bhosle, Mohammed Rafi	
"Is Jahan Ka Pyar Jhutha, Yaar Ka Ikrar Jhutha, Haan Bhi Jhuthi, Na Bhi Jhuthi"	Asha Bhosle, Mohammed Rafi, Manna Dey	
"Ab Dar Hai Kiska Pyare"	Mohammed Rafi	
"Lene Se Inkaar Nahin"	Mohammed Rafi	
"Le Lo Le Lo Gubbare"	C. Ramchandra	

== Production ==
Amar Deep is the first film produced by Sivaji Films (later renamed Sivaji Productions).
