= Random Harvest (film) =

1942 American film by Mervyn LeRoy

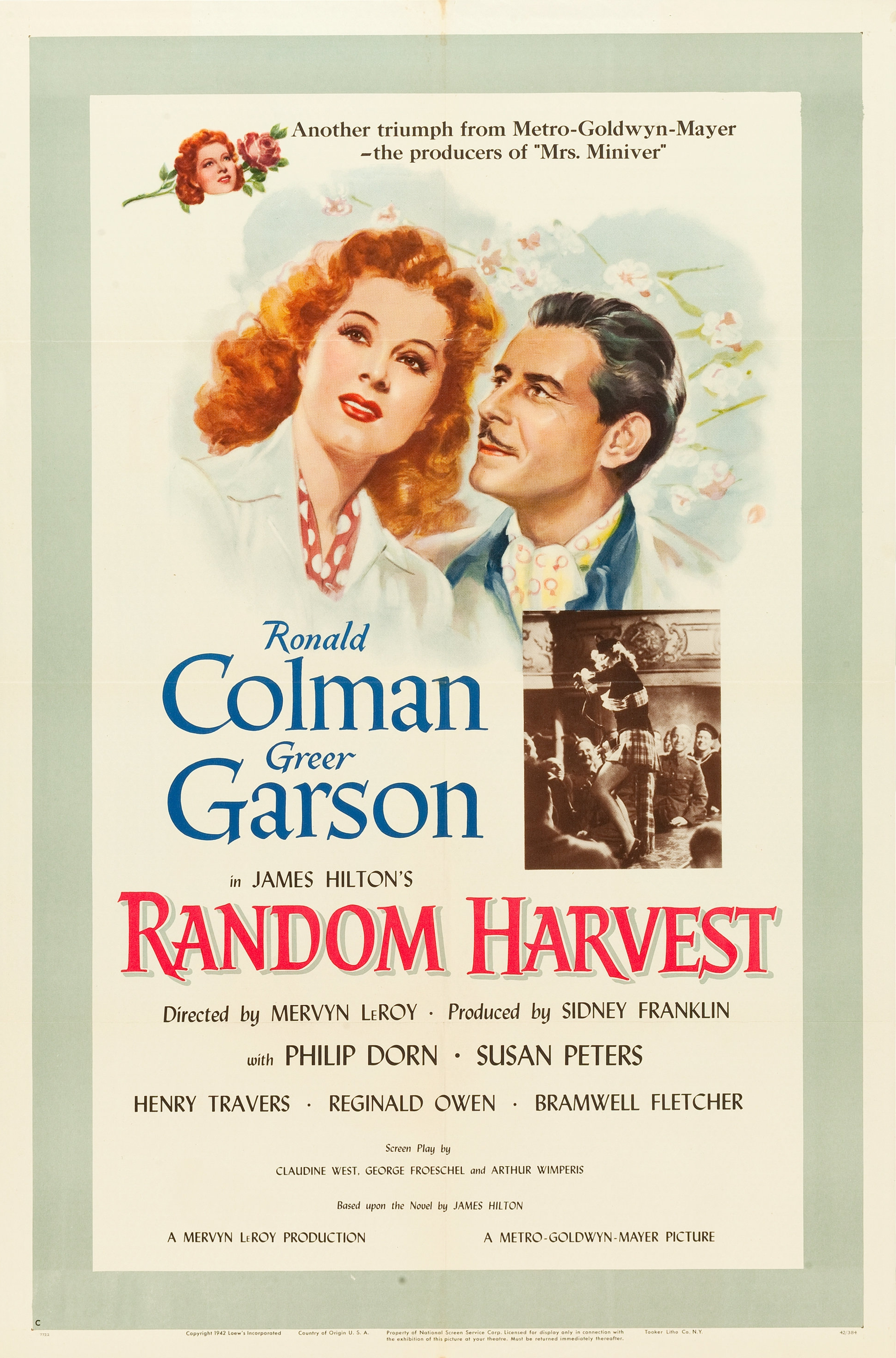
- Theatrical release poster
- Directed by: Mervyn LeRoy
- Screenplay by: Arthur Wimperis; George Froeschel; Claudine West
- Based on: Random Harvest; 1941 novel by James Hilton
- Produced by: Sidney Franklin
- Starring: Ronald Colman; Greer Garson; Philip Dorn; Susan Peters
- Cinematography: Joseph Ruttenberg
- Edited by: Harold F. Kress
- Music by: Herbert Stothart
- Production company: Metro-Goldwyn-Mayer
- Distributed by: Loew's Inc.
- Release date: December 17, 1942
- Running time: 125 minutes
- Language: English
- Budget: $1,210,000
- Box office: $8,147,000

Random Harvest is a 1942 American romantic drama film based on the 1941 James Hilton novel of the same title, directed by Mervyn LeRoy. Claudine West, George Froeschel, and Arthur Wimperis adapted the novel for the screen, and received an Academy Award nomination. The novel keeps the true identity of Paula/Margaret a secret until the very end, something that would have been impossible in a film, where characters’ faces must be seen. This meant that the movie had to take a very different approach to the story. The film stars Ronald Colman as a shellshocked, amnesiac World War I veteran, and Greer Garson as his love interest.

The film was an instant commercial success and was nominated for seven Academy Awards, including Best Actor for Colman, Best Supporting Actress for Susan Peters, Best Director for Mervyn LeRoy and Best Picture. Garson, whose performance was well-received, was nominated for and won the Academy Award for Best Actress that year for her role in Mrs. Miniver.

== Plot ==
In the last days of the First World War, a British officer who had been gassed in the trenches and lost his memory is confined to an English asylum as "John Smith," an unidentified inmate. On the day the war ends, the asylum's gatekeepers abandon their posts to join the celebration in the nearby Midlands town of Melbridge, and Smith wanders away.

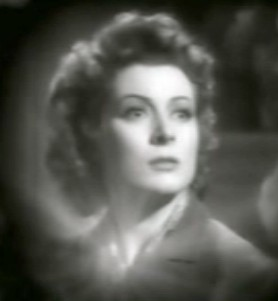
Greer Garson from the trailer for Random Harvest

In town, he is befriended by a singer with the stage name Paula Ridgeway. She guesses he is from the asylum, but as he seems harmless, she arranges for him to join her traveling theatrical group. After an incident that threatens to bring unwanted attention, Paula takes Smith to a secluded country village in Devon, where they stay at an inn run by Mrs. Deventer. They fall in love and marry, renting a small cottage and eventually having a son.

"Smithy", as Paula calls him, discovers he has some literary talent. Paula remains home with their newborn son while Smithy goes to Liverpool for a job interview with a newspaper. He is struck by a taxi. When he regains consciousness, his past memory is restored, but his life with Paula is now forgotten. He is Charles Rainier, the son of a wealthy businessman. None of his meager possessions, including a key, provide any clue about where he has been. Charles returns home on the day of his father's funeral. Kitty, the stepdaughter of one of Charles's siblings, becomes infatuated with her "uncle." Charles wants to return to college, but the mismanaged family business needs him, and he puts off his own desires to safeguard the jobs of his many employees and restore the family fortune. After a few years, a newspaper touts him as the "Industrial Prince of England."

Meanwhile, Paula has been searching frantically for her Smithy. Their son died as an infant, and she now works as a secretary. One day, she sees Charles' picture and story in a magazine. Paula becomes his executive assistant under her real name, Margaret Hanson, hoping that her presence will jog his memory. Dr. Jonathan Benet, who works at the Melbridge asylum, is her confidant and admirer. He warns her that revealing her identity would only cause Charles to resent her.

As Kitty grows up, she sends Charles love letters, and they become engaged. However, a hymn that Kitty is considering for their wedding triggers a vague memory in Charles. Kitty, realizing he still loves someone else, sadly breaks off the engagement.

Margaret joins Charles in Liverpool, where he is trying one last time to piece together his lost years. They recover his old suitcase from a hotel's lost and found, but he recognizes nothing. Charles is approached to stand for Parliament. After his election, in which Margaret provides invaluable assistance, he feels the need for a wife in his new role. He proposes to her, more as a business proposition than a romantic one, and she accepts. They become an ideal couple, at least to all outward appearances, with Margaret a perfect society hostess. They discuss his lost past, and she tells him of her own lost love, without revealing that it is him. He hopes their life together can fill the void they both feel.

After three years of marriage, she decides to take an extended solo vacation abroad. Before her liner sails, she revisits the village where she and Smithy lived. Charles is summoned to mediate a strike at the Melbridge Cable Works. After the successful negotiation, he walks through the town, and the surroundings and celebrations begin to unlock his memories, leading him to the nearby village and the cottage he and Paula shared. Hesitantly, he tries the old key he kept; it unlocks the door. Margaret, about to leave for her boat, makes a casual remark to the innkeeper about her predecessor, Mrs. Deventer. The innkeeper tells her that a gentleman just that morning had inquired about Mrs. Deventer, and had mentioned that he used to rent a cottage near a church. Margaret hurries to the cottage and finds Charles at the front door. She tentatively calls out "Smithy?" Charles turns and recognises her. He rushes to embrace her, calling her Paula.

== Cast ==
- Ronald Colman as Charles Rainier/"Smithy"
- Greer Garson as "Paula Ridgeway"/Margaret Hanson
- Philip Dorn as Dr. Jonathan Benet
- Susan Peters as Kitty Chilcet
- Henry Travers as Dr. Sims
- Reginald Owen as Biffer
- Bramwell Fletcher as Harrison
- Rhys Williams as Sam
- Una O'Connor as Tobacco Shopkeeper
- Aubrey Mather as Sheldon
- Margaret Wycherly as Mrs. Deventer
- Arthur Margetson as Chetwynd Rainier
- Melville Cooper as George Rainier
- Alan Napier as Julian Rainier
- Jill Esmond as Lydia Rainier
- Ivan F. Simpson as Vicar
- Ann Richards as Bridget
- Norma Varden as Julia
- Marie De Becker as Vicar's Wife
- Charles Waldron as Mr. Lloyd
- Elisabeth Risdon as Mrs. Lloyd
- Clifford Severn as Albert (uncredited)

== Reception ==
According to MGM records, the film earned $4,650,000 in the United States and $8,147,000 worldwide for a profit of $4,384,000, making it their biggest hit of the season.

The film played for a record 11 weeks at Radio City Music Hall in New York, a record that lasted until at least the 1960s.

Despite its box office success, critics were not impressed at the time. James Agee wrote, "I would like to recommend this film to those who can stay interested in Ronald Colman's amnesia for two hours and who can with pleasure eat a bowl of Yardley's shaving soap for breakfast." In his New York Times review, Bosley Crowther was of the opinion that "for all its emotional excess, Random Harvest is a strangely empty film." "Miss Garson and Mr. Colman are charming; they act perfectly. But they never seem real." Variety praised the performances of the two leads, in particular Garson, but noted that Colman seemed older than the role.

Decades later, Jonathan Rosenbaum of the Chicago Reader allowed that it had "a kind of deranged sincerity and integrity on its own terms". Leonard Maltin's capsule review reads "James Hilton novel given supremely entertaining MGM treatment, with Colman and Garson at their best." Hal Erickson wrote, "Under normal circumstances, we wouldn't believe a minute of Random Harvest, but the magic spell woven by the stars and by author James Hilton (Lost Horizon, Goodbye Mr. Chips, etc.) transforms the wildly incredible into the wholly credible."

The film was ranked 36th by the American Film Institute in its 2002 AFI's 100 Years...100 Passions list.

On the review aggregator website Rotten Tomatoes, 83% of 12 critics' reviews are positive. Metacritic, which uses a weighted average, assigned the film a score of 62 out of 100, based on 11 critics, indicating "generally favorable" reviews.

== Academy Award nominations ==
- Best Picture (Outstanding Motion Picture)
- Best Director – Mervyn LeRoy
- Best Actor in a Leading Role – Ronald Colman
- Best Actress in a Supporting Role – Susan Peters
- Best Writing, Screenplay – Claudine West, George Froeschel and Arthur Wimperis
- Best Music, Scoring of a Dramatic or Comedy Picture – Herbert Stothart
- Best Art Direction-Interior Decoration, Black-and-White – Cedric Gibbons and Randall Duell (Art Direction), Edwin B. Willis and Jack D. Moore (Interior Decoration)

== Film musical track ==
- Viva La Company!
  - Sung a cappella by a mob at the end of the War
- God Save the King!
  - Music attributed to Henry Carey
  - Sung a cappella by a mob at the end of the War
- Pack Up Your Troubles in Your Old Kit-Bag
  - Music by Felix Powell
  - Lyrics by George Asaf
  - Sung a cappella by a mob at the end of the War
- Sobre las olas (Over the Waves)
  - Music by Juventino Rosas
  - Played offscreen at the theater where Paula works
- She's Ma Daisy
  - Music by Harry Lauder
  - Lyrics by Harry Lauder and J.D. Harper
  - Sung and Danced at the theater by Greer Garson and chorus
- It's a Long Way to Tipperary
  - Written by Jack Judge and Harry Williams
  - Sung and Danced by the audience at the theater
- The Voice That Breathed O'er Eden
  - Words by John Keble
  - Music by Henry J. Gauntlett
- O Perfect Love
  - Words by Dorothy B. Gurney
  - Music by Joseph Barnby
- Symphony No. 5 in E minor, Op. 64
  - Written by Pyotr Ilyich Tchaikovsky
- For He's a Jolly Good Fellow
  - Sung by a mob for Rainier mediating a strike
- Swan Lake, Op 20, Act II: No. 10, Moderato
  - Written by Pyotr Ilyich Tchaikovsky
- Swan Lake, Op 20, Act II: No. 13, Danse des Cygnes
  - Written by Pyotr Ilyich Tchaikovsky
- Swan Lake Op 20, No. 29, Scene Finale
  - Written by Pyotr Ilyich Tchaikovsky

== In popular culture ==
This film is alluded to in the third season of British sitcom As Time Goes By. Lionel and Jean attend a meeting in Los Angeles about a script he is about to write, and co-executive creative consultants Josh and Lisa come up with a "mangled version" of Random Harvest, about "Lionel being shot in the head every five minutes."

Several Indian films were influenced by this film: the Bengali film Harano Sur (1957), the Tamil film Amara Deepam (1956), the Hindi film Amar Deep (1958) and Ek Musafir Ek Hasina (1962).

In 1973, an episode of The Carol Burnett Show featured a spoof of the film called "Rancid Harvest", with Carol Burnett in Greer Garson's role and Harvey Korman in Ronald Colman's.

The 1980 blockbuster Pakistani film Bandish, starring Shabnam and Nadeem, was also inspired by this film. The music of the film was composed by Robin Ghosh, which went on to become some of the most renowned melodies of the decade in Pakistan.

== Music ==
In 2006 Film Score Monthly released the majority of the film's original score alongside Stothart's score for The Yearling (1946) in the CD collection Random Harvest/The Yearling (1942/1946) limited to 3000 copies. Liner notes for both scores were provided by Marilee Bradford.

Track listing for Random Harvest

1. Opening Title & Asylum – 3:05
2. Addenda to Her Decision – 2:01
3. Little Marriage – 1:03
4. Kitty Continued/Kitty Grows Up – 3:28
5. At the Savoy/Dreams at the Savoy – 4:32
6. Voice That Breathed O'er Eden/Wedding Remembrance (O Perfect Love)/Someone You Once Knew – 5:38
7. Prime Minister Reception – 1:28
8. Try to Remember/Finale – 7:31

Bonus tracks

1. Opening Title & Asylum (instrumental) – 3:05
2. Tobacco Shop Meeting/Medley/Leaving Biffers (incomplete mixes) – 2:57
3. She Is Ma Daisy (source music) – 2:19

Total Time: 37:31

== Home media ==
Warner Home Video released a restored and remastered version in DVD format in 2005.
