= Knight Without Armour =

1937 film by Jacques Feyder

- U.S. film poster as reproduced on bookcover
- Directed by: Jacques Feyder
- Screenplay by: Lajos Bíró; Frances Marion; Arthur Wimperis (additional dialogue)
- Based on: Knight Without Armour; 1934 novel by James Hilton
- Produced by: Alexander Korda
- Starring: Marlene Dietrich; Robert Donat
- Cinematography: Harry Stradling Sr.
- Edited by: Francis D. Lyon
- Music by: Miklós Rózsa; Pyotr Ilyich Tchaikovsky
- Production company: London Film Productions
- Distributed by: United Artists
- Release date: 1 June 1937
- Running time: 107 minutes
- Country: United Kingdom
- Language: English
- Budget: $350,000 or £300,000

Knight Without Armour (styled as Knight Without Armor in some releases) is a 1937 British historical drama film starring Marlene Dietrich and Robert Donat. It was directed by Jacques Feyder and produced by Alexander Korda from a screenplay by Lajos Bíró adapted by Frances Marion from the 1933 novel by James Hilton. The novel was published in the United States as Without Armour. The music score was by Miklós Rózsa, his first for a motion picture, using additional music by Tchaikovsky.

== Plot ==
Englishman A. J. Fothergill is recruited by Colonel Forrester to spy on Russia for the British government because he can speak the language fluently. As "Peter Ouranoff", he infiltrates a revolutionary group led by Axelstein. The radicals try to blow up General Gregor Vladinoff, the father of Alexandra Adraxine. When the attempt fails, the would-be assassin is shot, but manages to reach Peter's apartment, where he dies. For his inadvertent involvement, Peter is sent to Siberia.

World War I makes Alexandra a widow and brings the Bolsheviks to power, freeing Peter and Axelstein. When the Russian Civil War breaks out, Alexandra is arrested for being an aristocrat, and Peter is assigned by now-Commissar Axelstein to take her to Petrograd to stand trial. However, Peter instead takes her to the safety of the White Army. Their relief is short-lived; the Red Army defeats the Whites the next day, and Alexandra is taken captive once more. Peter steals a commission as a commissar of prisons from a drunken official and uses the document to free her. The two, now deeply in love, flee into the forest on Alexandra's estate, where they enjoy a brief idyll. Later, they catch a train.

At a railway station, they pretend to be brother and sister, but one communist official has a photograph of the Countess. A young and sensitive Commissar Poushkoff, entranced by Alexandra's beauty, brings in an old gardener from her father's estate who, tipped off by Poushkoff, swears that she is not the Countess. They must go to Samara for confirmation of her identity, and Poushkoff arranges to escort them. On the train, on the first night, his suspicions are confirmed when he sees Peter tenderly kiss her hand. He advises them to come up with a better story. On the long journey, the trio become good friends. At one point, they tell him they "understand" (that he is in love with Alexandra), and Alexandra says that meeting him was the greatest luck they have had. Deeply moved, he breaks down, weeping and kissing her hand, and they both console him. At a stop, he obliquely suggests a means of escape and steps away. Peter wonders, "What about the boy?" who might suffer if they do run. A shot rings out: Poushkoff has committed suicide to provide a diversion.

The lovers board a barge travelling down the Volga River. Alexandra becomes seriously ill. When Peter goes for a doctor, he is arrested by the Whites for not having papers. Meanwhile, a doctor from an international Red Cross team finds Alexandra and takes her for treatment. About to be executed, Peter makes a break for it. At the station, a Red Cross doctor, a Scot who believes his story, dresses his wounded arm while a nurse reads aloud the passenger list of the train departing for Bucharest. When he hears Alexandra's name, Peter crashes through the door and runs for the departing train, calling her name. He clings to the outside of the cars. She hears him, tears the shade away from the window beside her bed, and reaches out to him, crying "Here!" as the train speeds them to safety.

== Cast ==
- Marlene Dietrich as Alexandra Adraxine, (née Vladinoff)
- Robert Donat as A.J. Fothergill / "Peter Ouranoff"
- Irene Vanbrugh as Duchess
- Herbert Lomas as General Gregor Vladinoff
- Austin Trevor as Colonel Adraxine, Alexandra's Husband
- Basil Gill as Axelstein
- David Tree as Maronin
- John Clements as Poushkoff
- Frederick Culley as Stanfield
- Laurence Hanray as Colonel Forester
- Dorice Fordred as The Maid
- Franklin Kelsey as Tomsky
- Laurence Baskcomb as Commissar
- Hay Petrie as Station Master
- Miles Malleson as Drunken Red Commissar

== Production ==
According to Robert Osborne of Turner Classic Movies, Donat suffered a severe, week-long bout of his chronic asthma during production, causing Alexander Korda to consider replacing him. Dietrich persuaded him to wait until Donat recovered.

In September 1936, two LNER Class J15 locomotives (numbers 7541 and 7835) were withdrawn by the LNER and sold to London Film Productions for use in this film. The locomotives were moved to Denham studios, where they underwent cosmetic modification to look more Russian. They were later sold to the War Department and worked on the Shropshire and Montgomeryshire Railway as WD221 and WD212. During their war service, both were involved in incidents and returned to Stratford in 1944 and were subsequently scrapped.

The sets were designed by Lazare Meerson the renowned Franco-Russian.

== Reception ==
=== Box office ===
Kinematograph Weekly reported the film as a "runner up" at the British box office in January 1938.

=== Critical ===
The New York Times critic Frank Nugent praised the film, approving the title change from the book (from Without Armour to Knight Without Armour), "placing it in the realm of chivalry and high adventure". He described the production as "a perfect fusion of several remarkable talents, so serene a blend that we cannot be sure which division is entitled to the most credit... It is a soundly narrated picture—colorful, romantic, melodramatic, and a first rate entertainment". Nugent singled out "relative newcomer" John Clements's "moving and poignant" portrayal of Poushkoff, predicting that "we shall probably hear more of him". In fact, Clements had a brilliant career ahead of him, including a knighthood.

In a 2016 article for Criterion, critic Michael Sragow notes, "Between 1935 and 1940, when [Graham] Greene was the movie critic for The Spectator and the short-lived weekly Night and Day, no spy film won higher praise from him than ... Knight Without Armour. Greene described the film as "melodrama of the most engaging kind, the heroic wish-fulfillment dream of adolescence all the world over". But he loved it all the same. Using one of the highest terms of praise in his critical lexicon, Greene called it "a first-class thriller". Greene's complete review appears at the end of the piece.

The Variety review was somewhat unfavourable: "A labored effort to keep this picture neutral on the subject of the Russian Revolution finally completely overshadows the simple love story intertwining Marlene Dietrich and Robert Donat. ... Performances on the whole are good, though Dietrich restricts herself to just looking glamorous in any setting or costume."

Dietrich had been promised $250,000 plus 10% of the gross profits for her efforts. Korda's usual extravagance resulted in a budget of $350,000, much of it spent on authentic sets and costumes, and the film did not make a profit. Korda was unable to pay Dietrich fully, but she agreed to forego the rest if Korda hired Josef von Sternberg to direct I, Claudius.
