= We Are Not Alone (novel) =

1937 novel by James Hilton

- First UK edition (publ. Macmillan
- Author: James Hilton
- Subject: World War I
- Published: Boston: Little, Brown, and Company, 12 March 1937
- Media type: Book
- Pages: 231
- OCLC: 365057
- LC Class: PR6015.I53

We Are Not Alone is a 1937 novel by James Hilton. It is one of his more sombre works, portraying the tragic consequences of anti-foreign hysteria in England just before World War I. It has been compared to Goodbye, Mr. Chips in its portrayal of small-town life through the eyes of an everyman protagonist.

== Synopsis ==
Dr. Newcome is a beloved doctor in a small English town. His frustrations with his relationships with his wife and son lead to his developing an affair with a German dancer, Leni, whom the family takes on as a governess. When Newcome's wife Jessica is killed under suspicious circumstances, both Dr. Newcome and Leni fall under suspicion. The town's prejudice against Leni as a German leads them to convict her and Dr. Newcome despite only circumstantial evidence.

== Adaptations ==
A one-hour radio adaptation by James Hilton and Barbara Burnham was broadcast on the BBC National Programme on 6 April 1938, with a cast that included Emlyn Williams as the doctor, Edgar Norfolk, Gordon McLeod and Nan Marriott-Watson.

It was made into a film with the same title, with the screenplay by the author, in 1939.
