= List of American film major guilds awards =

Starting in 1995, major awards collectively from the four most prestigious American film major guilds' associations:

- Writers Guild of America Awards (WGA) - (both Adapted and Original)
- Producers Guild of America Awards (PGA)
- Directors Guild of America Awards (DGA)
- Screen Actors Guild Awards (SAG) - (Outstanding Performance by a Cast in a Motion Picture only)

Similar to the film critics' awards, these four guilds' awards in a single (or more than once) film/s secure its wins significantly increase its chances to the eventual winner of the Academy Awards, often seen as a strong indicator of future award success.

As of 2025, American Beauty, No Country for Old Men, Slumdog Millionaire, Argo and Everything Everywhere All at Once are the only five films to have won all four guilds' awards and ended up winning the Academy Award for Best Picture at their respective annual years.

== Winners ==
Year	WGA	PGA	DGA	SAG	Best Picture winner	Total
1995	Sense and Sensibility (Adapted) Braveheart (Original)	Apollo 13			Braveheart	Apollo 13 (3)
1996	Sling Blade (Adapted) Fargo (Original)	The English Patient		The Birdcage	The English Patient	The English Patient (2)
1997	L.A. Confidential (Adapted) As Good As It Gets (Original)	Titanic		The Full Monty	Titanic	Titanic (2)
1998	Out of Sight (Adapted) Shakespeare in Love (Original)	Saving Private Ryan		Shakespeare in Love		Saving Private Ryan / Shakespeare in Love (2)
1999	Election (Adapted) American Beauty (Original)	American Beauty				American Beauty (4)
2000	Traffic (Adapted) You Can Count on Me (Original)	Gladiator	Crouching Tiger, Hidden Dragon	Traffic	Gladiator	Traffic (2)
2001	A Beautiful Mind (Adapted) Gosford Park (Original)	Moulin Rouge!	A Beautiful Mind	Gosford Park	A Beautiful Mind	A Beautiful Mind (3)
2002	The Hours (Adapted) Bowling for Columbine (Original)	Chicago				Chicago (3)
2003	American Splendor (Adapted) Lost in Translation (Original)	The Lord of the Rings: The Return of the King				The Lord of the Rings: The Return of the King (3)
2004	Sideways (Adapted) Eternal Sunshine of the Spotless Mind (Original)	The Aviator	Million Dollar Baby	Sideways	Million Dollar Baby	Million Dollar Baby / Sideways (2)
2005	Brokeback Mountain (Adapted) Crash (Original)	Brokeback Mountain		Crash		Brokeback Mountain (3)
2006	The Departed (Adapted) Little Miss Sunshine (Original)	Little Miss Sunshine	The Departed	Little Miss Sunshine	The Departed	Little Miss Sunshine (3)
2007	No Country for Old Men (Adapted) Juno (Original)	No Country for Old Men				No Country for Old Men (4)
2008	Slumdog Millionaire (Adapted) Milk (Original)	Slumdog Millionaire				Slumdog Millionaire (4)
2009	Up in the Air (Adapted) The Hurt Locker (Original)	The Hurt Locker		Inglourious Basterds	The Hurt Locker	The Hurt Locker (3)
2010	The Social Network (Adapted) Inception (Original)	The King's Speech				The King's Speech (3)
2011	The Descendants (Adapted) Midnight in Paris (Original)	The Artist		The Help	The Artist	The Artist (2)
2012	Argo (Adapted) Zero Dark Thirty (Original)	Argo				Argo (4)
2013	Captain Philips (Adapted) Her (Original)	12 Years a Slave Gravity	Gravity	American Hustle	12 Years a Slave	Gravity (2)
2014	The Imitation Game (Adapted) The Grand Budapest Hotel (Original)	Birdman				Birdman (3)
2015	The Big Short (Adapted) Spotlight (Original)	The Big Short	The Revenant	Spotlight		The Big Short / Spotlight (2)
2016	Arrival (Adapted) Moonlight (Original)	La La Land		Hidden Figures	Moonlight	La La Land (2)
2017	Call Me by Your Name (Adapted) Get Out (Original)	The Shape of Water		Three Billboards Outside Ebbing, Missouri	The Shape of Water	The Shape of Water (2)
2018	Can You Ever Forgive Me? (Adapted) Eighth Grade (Original)	Green Book	Roma	Black Panther	Green Book	Five films each received one award
2019	Jojo Rabbit (Adapted) Parasite (Original)	1917		Parasite		1917 / Parasite (2)
2020	Borat Subsequent Moviefilm (Adapted) Promising Young Woman (Original)	Nomadland		The Trial of the Chicago 7	Nomadland	Nomadland (2)
2021	CODA (Adapted) Don't Look Up (Original)	CODA	The Power of the Dog	CODA		CODA (3)
2022	Women Talking (Adapted) Everything Everywhere All at Once (Original)	Everything Everywhere All at Once				Everything Everywhere All at Once (4)
2023	American Fiction (Adapted) The Holdovers (Original)	Oppenheimer				Oppenheimer (3)
2024	Nickel Boys (Adapted) Anora (Original)	Anora		Conclave	Anora	Anora (3)

== Milestones ==
=== Three awards ===
All five films have won three awards (PGA, DGA, SAG) and also Best Picture but failed to win the Writers Guild of America Awards for categories. These included Chicago, The Lord of the Rings: The Return of the King, The King's Speech, Birdman, and Oppenheimer; The Return of the King, The King's Speech and Birdman instead winning the Academy Award for writing categories. Apollo 13 is the only film to win all three but failed both to win Best Picture and WGA.

=== PGA and DGA ===
Since 1990, both PGA and DGA are extremely attached each other can have a high possibility of chances to the eventual winner of Academy Awards for Best Picture and Best Directing. With the exception of first four films (1990–1994), only twenty-three films have won two out of four guilds' awards with the remaining fifteen also win both Best Picture and Directing; each five films have won overall with the most consecutive years (2007–2011). The remaining eight films failed to win Best Picture or Directing: exceptional films did not win Best Picture including Apollo 13, Saving Private Ryan, Brokeback Mountain, Gravity, La La Land and 1917; exceptional films did not win Best Directing including Apollo 13, Chicago, Argo, and 1917; only Apollo 13 and 1917 are the only films failed to win Academy Awards.

== See also ==
- Big Five (Academy Awards)
