= We Are Not Alone (1939 film) =

1939 film by Edmund Goulding

- Directed by: Edmund Goulding
- Written by: James Hilton (novel and screenplay); Milton Krims (screenplay)
- Produced by: Hal B. Wallis (exec. producer); Henry Blanke (assoc. producer)
- Starring: Paul Muni; Jane Bryan; Flora Robson
- Cinematography: Tony Gaudio
- Edited by: Warren Low
- Music by: Max Steiner
- Production company: First National Pictures
- Distributed by: Warner Bros. Pictures
- Release date: November 25, 1939
- Running time: 112 minutes
- Country: United States
- Language: English

We Are Not Alone is a 1939 American drama film directed by Edmund Goulding and starring Paul Muni, Jane Bryan, and Flora Robson. The film is based on the 1937 novel We Are Not Alone by James Hilton, who adapted his novel with Milton Krims.

== Plot ==
Dr. David Newcome lives in a small town in the English fenlands with his shrewish wife, idealistic son and elderly maid. One day he brings home a traveling theater performer who had attempted suicide. She eventually comes to live in the house as the child's governess. This, however, disrupts the balance of power in the home, as the wife fells that the governess is usurping her role as primare caregiver, while people in the village begin to talk about a possible affair between the governess and the doctor. This suspicion is only heightened after the July Crisis and the increase of Anti-German sentiment in the neighborhood, including the stoning of a German owned store.

After his son mixes up the medicine in bottles in his cabinet, his wife fatally overdoses on poison and both Dr. Newcome and Leni are put on trial.

== Cast ==
- Paul Muni as Dr. David Newcome
- Jane Bryan as Leni Krafft
- Flora Robson as Jessica Newcome
- Raymond Severn as Gerald Newcome
- Una O'Connor as Susan
- Henry Daniell as Sir Ronald Dawson
- Montagu Love as Major Millman
- James Stephenson as Sir William Clintock
- Stanley Logan as Sir Guy Lockhead
- Cecil Kellaway as Judge
- Alan Napier as Archdeacon
- Eily Malyon as Archdeacon's Wife
- Douglas Scott as Tommy Baker
- Crauford Kent as Dr. Stacey
- Billy Bevan as Mr. Jones
- Holmes Herbert as Police Inspector
- John Powers as Charley
- Colin Kenny as George
- Ethel Griffies as Mrs. Raymond

== Reception ==
Frank Nugent praised the film in his The New York Times review, writing "his [James Hilton's] We Are Not Alone emerges as a film of rare tenderness and beauty, compassionate and grave, possessed above all of the quality of serenity...one of the most soundly written films of the year, one of the best directed and, of course, one of the most brilliantly played."
