= Goodbye, Mr. Chips (1939 film) =

1939 film by Sam Wood

- Theatrical release poster
- Directed by: Sam Wood
- Screenplay by: R. C. Sherriff; Claudine West; Eric Maschwitz
- Based on: Goodbye, Mr. Chips; 1934 novella by James Hilton
- Produced by: Victor Saville
- Starring: Robert Donat; Greer Garson
- Cinematography: Freddie Young
- Edited by: Charles Frend
- Music by: Richard Addinsell
- Production company: Metro-Goldwyn-Mayer
- Distributed by: Loew's Inc.
- Release date: 15 May 1939 (New York)
- Running time: 114 minutes
- Countries: United Kingdom; United States
- Language: English
- Budget: $1,051,000 or £243,340
- Box office: $3,252,000

Goodbye, Mr. Chips is a 1939 romantic drama film starring Robert Donat and Greer Garson, and directed by Sam Wood. Based on the 1934 novella of the same name by James Hilton, the film is about Mr. Chipping, a beloved aged school teacher and former headmaster of a boys' boarding school, who recalls his career and his personal life over the decades. Produced for the British division of MGM at Denham Studios, the film was dedicated to film producer Irving Thalberg, who died on 14 September 1936. At the 12th Academy Awards, it was nominated for seven awards, including Best Picture, and Donat, for his performance as Mr. Chipping, won the award for Best Actor.

At the time of its release, the picture appeared on Film Daily's and the National Board of Review's ten best lists for 1939 and received the "best picture" distinction in The Hollywood Reporter Preview Poll of May 1939.

== Plot ==
Due to a cold, retired schoolteacher Mr. Chipping misses a first-day assembly at Brookfield public school for the first time in 58 years. That afternoon, he falls asleep in his chair and his teaching career is related via flashback.

When 25-year-old Charles Edward Chipping first arrives as a Latin teacher in 1870, he becomes a target of practical jokes on his first day. He reacts by imposing strict discipline in his classroom, making him disliked but respected. Twenty years pass and he becomes the senior master. He is disappointed in not receiving an appointment as a housemaster within the school for the following year. However, the new German teacher, Max Staefel, saves him from despair by inviting him to share a walking holiday to his native Austria.

While mountain-climbing, Chipping encounters Kathy Ellis, a feisty English suffragette who is on a cycling holiday with a friend. They meet again in Vienna, where she persuades him to dance to the Blue Danube Waltz. (This piece of music is used as a leitmotif, symbolizing Chipping's love for her.) Staefel remarks that the Danube does not appear blue, but Chipping remarks it only appears so to those who are in love. On another part of the same boat, as Kathy looks at the river, she tells her friend that it is blue. Even though Kathy is considerably younger and livelier than Chipping, she loves and marries him. They return to England, where Kathy takes up residence at the school, charming everyone with her warmth.

During their tragically short marriage (she dies in childbirth, along with their baby), she brings "Chips" out of his shell and shows him how to be a better teacher. He acquires a flair for Latin puns. As the years pass, Chips becomes a much-loved school institution, developing a rapport with generations of pupils; he teaches the sons and grandsons of many of his earlier pupils.

In 1909, when he is pressured to retire by a more "modern" headmaster, the boys and the board of governors of the school take his side of the argument and tell him he can stay until he is 100, and that he is free to pronounce Cicero as SIS-er-ro, and not as KEE-kir-ro.

Chips finally retires in 1914 at the age of 69, saying, "Haec olim meminisse iuvabit" (One day, we'll look back on this and smile), but is summoned back to serve as interim headmaster because of the shortage of teachers resulting from the First World War. He remembers Kathy had predicted he would become headmaster one day. During a bombing attack by a German Zeppelin, Chips insists that the boys keep on translating their Latin, choosing the story of Julius Caesar's battles against Germanic tribes, which describes the latter's belligerent nature, much to the amusement of his pupils. As the Great War drags on, Chips reads aloud into the school's Roll of Honour every Sunday the names of the many former boys and teachers who have died in the war. Upon discovering that Max Staefel has died fighting on the German side, Chips reads out his name in chapel, too.

He retires permanently in 1918 but continues living nearby. He is on his deathbed in 1933 when he overhears his colleagues talking about him. He responds: "I thought I heard you say it was a pity—pity I never had any children. But you're wrong. I have! Thousands of them, thousands of them...and all...boys."

== Cast ==
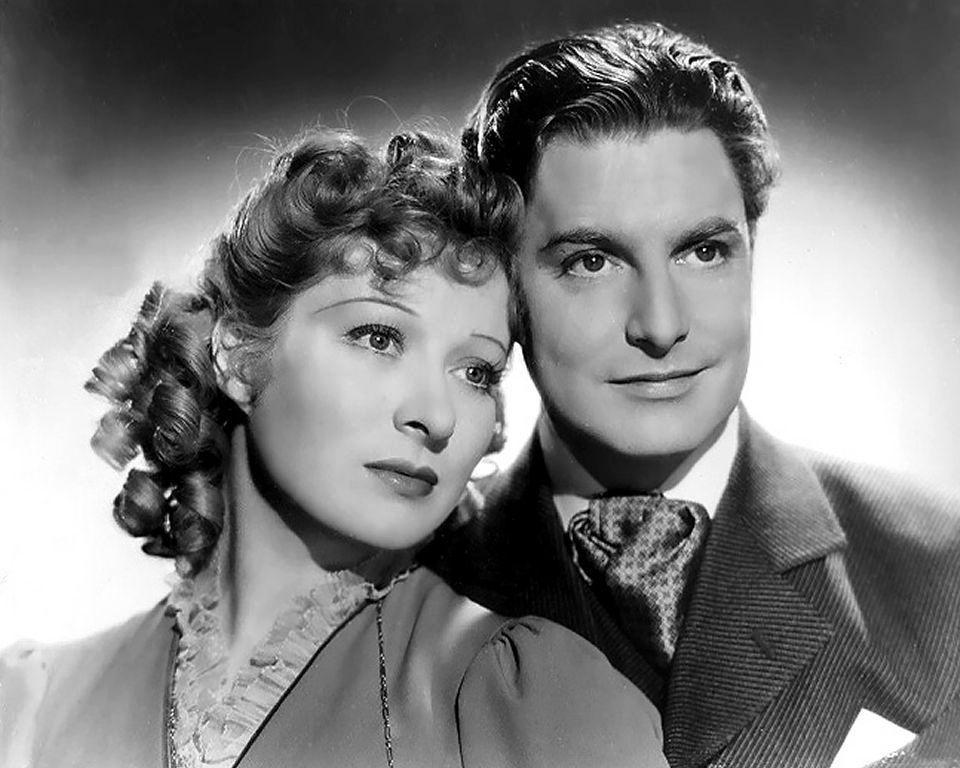
Promotional photograph of Greer Garson and Robert Donat in Goodbye, Mr. Chips

- Robert Donat as Charles "Mr. Chips" Chipping, M.A. (Cantab.). The 34-year-old Donat begins playing a man 10 years younger than himself and ages over the course of the film to his mid-80s. He remarked: "As soon as I put the moustache on, I felt the part, even if I did look like a great airedale come out of a puddle."
- Greer Garson as Katherine Ellis. Garson was initially offered a contract for MGM in 1937 but refused all the minor parts she was offered until she was given this role. The AFI Catalog reports that, according to modern sources, Garson was personally signed for the picture by M-G-M studio head Louis B. Mayer after Mayer saw her in a London stage play.
- Terry Kilburn as John Colley, Peter Colley I, II and III (several generations of pupils from the same family taught by Mr. Chips)
- John Mills as Peter Colley (as a young man)
- Paul Henreid as Max Staeffel M.A. (Oxon.), the German master (credited as Paul Von Hernried)
- Judith Furse as Flora
- Lyn Harding as Dr. John Hamilton Wetherby D.D. (Cantab.), headmaster of Brookfield when Chips first arrives
- Milton Rosmer as Mr. Chatteris, headmaster of Brookfield in the 1890s
- Austin Trevor as Ralston, headmaster of Brookfield before the First World War
- Frederick Leister as Marsham, headmaster of Brookfield when Chips dies
- Louise Hampton as Mrs. Wickett, Chips' housekeeper
- David Tree as Mr. Jackson B.A. (Cantab.), new history master at Brookfield
- Edmond Breon as Colonel Morgan
- Jill Furse as Helen Colley, the wife of the grown Peter Colley
- Scott Sunderland as Sir John Colley, the grown pupil John Colley
- David Croft as Perkins – Greengrocer's boy (uncredited)
- Simon Lack as Wainwright (uncredited)

== Acknowledgements ==
The opening credits contain a card that reads: "To Sidney Franklin...For his contribution in the preparation of the production...Grateful acknowledgement,"

The opening credits also contain a dedication to Irving Thalberg, who died in September 1936. It reads:

"We wish to acknowledge here our gratitude to the late Irving Thalberg, whose inspiration illuminates the picture of Goodbye, Mr. Chips"— James Hilton, Victor Saville, Sam Wood, Sidney A. Franklin, R. C. Sherriff, Claudine West, Eric Maschwitz

== Production ==
The AFI Catalog reports that Thalberg purchased Goodbye, Mr. Chips from galley proofs; he originally assigned Sidney Franklin to direct. After Franklin became an MGM producer, Sam Wood replaced him as director.

David Lewis said that the film was developed by Irving Thalberg as a vehicle for Charles Laughton and that Lewis suggested that R.C. Sherriff should write the script. However, when Thalberg died, it was reassigned to Robert Donat and Lewis was replaced by an English producer.

== Filming locations ==
The exteriors of the buildings of the fictional Brookfield School were shot at Repton School, an independent school (at the time of filming, for boys only), in the village of Repton in Derbyshire; whilst the interiors, school courtyards and annexes, including the supposedly exterior shots of the Austrian Tyrol Mountains, were filmed at Denham Film Studios near the village of Denham in Buckinghamshire. Around 300 boys from Repton School—as well as members of the faculty—stayed on during the school holidays so they could appear in the film.

== Box office ==
According to MGM records, the film earned $1,717,000 in the US and Canada and $1,535,000 elsewhere, resulting in a profit of $1,305,000.

== Reception ==
In May 1939, The New York Times critic Frank S. Nugent praised the film at length, particularly the adaptation and the performances of Donat and Garson, among others.

In December 1939, Variety summed up the film as "a charming, quaintly sophisticated account [from the novel Goodbye, Mr. Chips! by James Hilton] of the life of a schoolteacher, highlighted by a remarkably fine performance from Robert Donat . . . The character he etches creates a bloodstream for the picture that keeps it intensely alive.”

Goodbye, Mr. Chips holds an 85% rating on Rotten Tomatoes based on twenty reviews.

== Legacy ==
The film was re-released in the United Kingdom in 1944 and again in 1954.

In 1999, Goodbye, Mr. Chips was voted the 72nd greatest British film ever in the British Film Institute Top 100 British films poll.

In 2003, the American Film Institute ranked Mr. Chipping the 41st greatest film hero of all time.

On TCM.com, Leonard Maltin gave the film 3.5 stars out of 4.

== Academy Awards and nominations ==
The film was nominated for seven Academy Awards: for Outstanding Production, Best Director, Actor, Actress, Best Writing, Screenplay, Best Film Editing, and Best Sound. It was up against Gone with the Wind in all seven categories; Robert Donat won for Best Actor, beating Laurence Olivier, Clark Gable and James Stewart, though Goodbye, Mr. Chips lost to Gone With the Wind in five of the six remaining categories, while Mr. Smith Goes to Washington won Best Original Story. (Best Sound went to When Tomorrow Comes.)

| Award | Result | Nominee |
|---|---|---|
| Outstanding Production | Nominated | Metro-Goldwyn-Mayer (Victor Saville, producer); Winner was Gone with the Wind (Selznick International Pictures (David O. Selznick, producer)) |
| Best Director | Nominated | Sam Wood; Winner was Victor Fleming – Gone with the Wind |
| Best Actor | Won | Robert Donat |
| Best Actress | Nominated | Greer Garson; Winner was Vivien Leigh – Gone with the Wind |
| Best Writing, Screenplay | Nominated | R. C. Sherriff, Claudine West, Eric Maschwitz; Winner was Sidney Howard – Gone with the Wind |
| Best Film Editing | Nominated | Charles Frend; Winner was Hal C. Kern and James E. Newcom – Gone with the Wind |
| Best Sound, Recording | Nominated | A. W. Watkins; Winner was Bernard B. Brown – When Tomorrow Comes |

== Remakes ==
Goodbye, Mr. Chips was remade as a musical in 1969, starring Peter O'Toole and Petula Clark. The James Hilton novel has also been adapted for television twice as serials in 1984 (starring Roy Marsden) and 2002 (starring Martin Clunes).

== See also ==
- BFI Top 100 British films
