= Murder at School =

Book by James Hilton

- First edition (publ. Ernest Benn)
- Author: James Hilton
- Language: English
- Publication date: 1931

Murder at School is a detective novel by James Hilton first published in 1931 under the pen-name Glen Trevor. It was released in the United States in 1933 under the title Was It Murder?.

== Introduction ==
Murder at School deals with the phenomenon of coincidence by posing the question of how likely it is that two brothers attending the same boarding school meet with two separate accidental deaths—and curious ones at that—within the same schoolyear. In the manner typical of the Golden Age whodunnit, the solution is only presented in the final pages of the novel. Throughout the book, an amateur sleuth and a Scotland Yard detective vie with each other to solve the riddle, with only one of them successful in the end.

Murder at School remained Hilton's only detective novel— a brief youthful foray into crime fiction he shares with writers such as C. S. Forester (Payment Deferred, 1926; Plain Murder, 1930) and C. P. Snow (Death Under Sail, 1932).

== Plot summary ==
Oakington is one of the lesser-known public schools in England, and Dr Roseveare, its headmaster, has been trying hard for seven years to improve its reputation. When, in the winter term of 1927-1928, one of the pupils is killed in his sleep by an old gas fitting falling down from the ceiling he contacts Colin Revell, an Old Boy, to discreetly investigate the matter. Not entirely convinced that there was no foul play involved but unable to pin down a motive on anyone, Revell leaves again after a few weeks, and most of the evidence is destroyed by the installation of electricity in the whole building.

A few months later Revell is shocked to learn that the deceased boy's brother has also died under mysterious circumstances—he seems to have jumped into the school's indoor swimming pool late at night after the water had been drained—and travels to Oakington of his own accord. Now it turns out that the closest relative of the two brothers, who have been orphans for years, is actually a teacher at Oakington, and that he stands to inherit a small fortune. At the same time Revell falls in love with that teacher's beautiful young wife.
