= Galina Kopernak =

Russian actress (1902–1985)

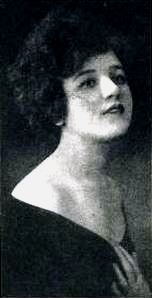
- Kopernak in 1922
- Born: March 22, 1902
- Died: July 11, 1985 (aged 83): Russian; American
- Occupations: Theatre actress; Playwright
- Years active: 1922–1929
- Spouses: Max Rabinowitsh (divorced) James Hilton (m. 1937; div. 1945)

Galina Kopernak (March 22, 1902 – July 11, 1985) was a Russian theater actress who appeared on Broadway in the 1920s. She may have been originally from Shanghai. She came to the United States from Moscow.

== Stage career ==
Kopernak performed at the Belmont Theater in New York City with Vera Smirnova, in April 1921. She was in the cast of Montmartre in February 1922. The production was adapted by Benjamin Glazer from the writing of Pierre Frondale. It was promised to New York a number of times before it was staged at the Belmont. Kopernak was joined by Helen Lowell, Helen Ware, and Mabel Frenyear among the players.

As a newcomer, in the role of Marie-Claire, she is mentioned in a review by Alexander Woollcott. He remarked, "she has style and talent and a considerable fascination, and when she is advised not to attempt certain emotional explosions, which are beyond her, she will do well."

Her next appearance was with Arnold Daly in The Farewell Supper at the Palace Theatre in New York City. Kopernak was signed by Louis Kaplan to perform in The Wasp at the Morosco Theatre. The play, by Thomas F. Fallon, was adapted from the novel The Last Warning by Wadsworth Camp. Kaplan made his debut as a Broadway producer with this presentation.

Kopernak was the leading lady in The Four-in-Hand which debuted at the Greenwich Village Theater in September 1923. The comedy was adapted from the French language of Paul Frank. Kopernak was given a disappointing review in her role as "the Wife" who divorces her husband because he fails to become jealous of her. The criticism had to do with her reach exceeding her grasp.

She played in Pierrot The Prodigal at the 48th Street Theater in March 1925. This was a Carre-Wormser pantomime with Laurette Taylor as the featured actress. Kopernak assumed the part played by Vivienne Osborne in Aloma of the South Seas in May 1925. Osborne left the play to replace Lenore Ulric in The Harem. Kopernak missed a performance because of a throat ailment but returned to the cast on May 16.

She authored and played the leading role in The Squall. It was presented by a Cleveland, Ohio stock company in the summer of 1925.

In September she headed a production of Love's Call, which was presented at the 39th Street Theater. It was written by Joe Byron Totten and had a supporting cast of Robert Gleckler, Norma Phillips, and Mitchell Harris. The play received negative publicity from critics and was halted before the first show began.

The elaborate Mexican costumes worn by the actors were seized by Georgette and Peggy, of 21 East 49th Street, makers of the clothing. They claimed a balance of $150 had not been paid by the producers. Kopernak removed her makeup, put on her street clothes, and left the theater. An audience of four hundred were in the venue, with many demanding their money back, and some accepting tickets for other plays.

Kopernak participated in What The Doctor Ordered (1927), a farce by Cesar Dunn. The players included Herbert Yost, Hale Hamilton, Eva Condon, and Louise Squires.

George Rosener, an actor in the Shubert Theater revues, wrote She Got What She Wanted. Kopernak was in a cast which performed the play at Wallack's Theater in May 1929. Some days after the premiere she was injured in a car accident, sustaining a fractured right index finger. She experienced pain and enlargement from swelling, so that her doctor advised her to remove herself from the production. As she portrayed the role of a Russian girl, producer George E. Wintz said she could not be replaced. Kopernak rejoined the production while wearing a cast on June 3.

== Private life ==
She loaned money to Russian royalist, Nicholas Arliokop, who emigrated to Canada using her funds. Arliokop made a fortune and willed $250,000 to Kopernak in 1929.

Kopernak is mentioned in a vital record of people with the "intention to marry" on March 20, 1930. Her husband to be was the Latvian concert pianist Max Rabinowitsh (1893–1973) born in Liepāja, who had immigrated to the United States in 1922 after the Russian Revolution of 1917. Max Rabinowitsch was 38 years old, and Kopernak 28. She later married and divorced novelist James Hilton.
