= George Froeschel =

Austrian-American screenwriter (1891–1979)

- Georg Fröschel
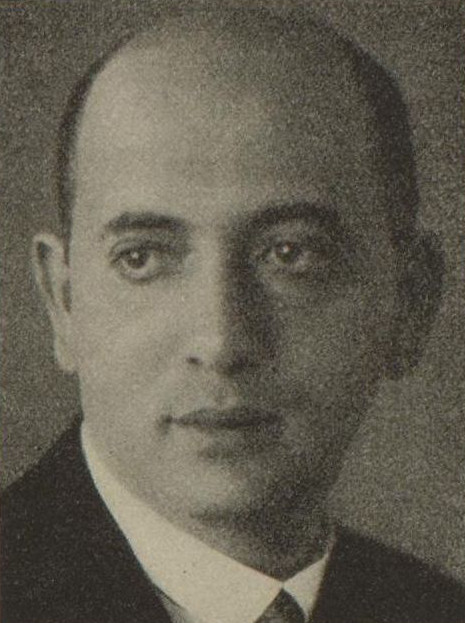
- Georg Fröschel
- Born: 9 March 1891; Vienna, Austria-Hungary
- Died: 22 November 1979 (aged 88); Los Angeles, California, U.S.
- Resting place: Hollywood Forever Cemetery
- Occupations: Novelist & Screenwriter
- Years active: 1919–1960

George Froeschel (9 March 1891 – 22 November 1979) was an Austrian novelist and screenwriter. In 1943, he received two Academy Award nominations for co-writing screenplays for Mrs. Miniver and Random Harvest. He won the Academy Award for Mrs. Miniver.

== Biography ==
Georg Froeschel was born in 1891, the son of a Jewish banker in Vienna. He wrote his first novel during his time at grammar school, Ein Protest (A Protest). After his postgraduate studies he was Doctor of Laws. In World War I he wrote reports for the k.u.k. army. Following he wrote several novels, of which some were adapted for films in the 1920s. In the 1920s he worked for the Ullstein-Verlag in Berlin.

In 1936 he emigrated to the United States, where he first worked in the editorial office of Chicago's Coronet magazine. His efforts to find a job in Hollywood's film industry were not successful until April 1939, when Sidney Franklin of MGM engaged him as screenwriter.

== Films ==
- 1921: Roswolsky's Mistress (GER, Felix Basch; based on a novel by G. Froeschel)
- 1921: Der Schlüssel zur Macht (AUT, ? ; based on a novel by G. Froeschel)
- 1927: Der Anwalt des Herzens (GER, Wilhelm Thiele; based on a novel by G. Froeschel)
- 1928: Weib in Flammen (GER, Max Reichmann; based on a novel by G. Froeschel)
- 1929: Scandal in Baden-Baden (GER, Erich Waschneck; based on a novel by G. Froeschel)

=== Screenwriter ===
- 1923: Nora (GER, Berthold Viertel)
- 1940: Waterloo Bridge (United States, Mervyn LeRoy)
- 1940: The Mortal Storm (United States, Frank Borzage)
- 1942: Mrs. Miniver (United States, William Wyler)
- 1942: Random Harvest (United States, Mervyn LeRoy)
- 1942: We Were Dancing (United States, Robert Z. Leonard)
- 1943: Madame Curie (United States, Mervyn LeRoy)
- 1944: The White Cliffs of Dover (United States, Clarence Brown)
- 1948: Command Decision (United States, Sam Wood)
- 1950: The Miniver Story (United States, H.C. Potter)
- 1951: The Unknown Man (United States, Richard Thorpe)
- 1952: Scaramouche (United States, George Sidney)
- 1953: The Story of Three Loves (United States, Vincente Minnelli, Gottfried Reinhardt)
- 1953: Never Let Me Go (United States, Delmer Daves)
- 1954: Rose Marie (United States, Mervyn LeRoy)
- 1954: Betrayed (United States, Gottfried Reinhardt)
- 1955: The Adventures of Quentin Durward (United States, Richard Thorpe)
- 1956: Gaby (United States, Curtis Bernhard)
- 1958: Me and the Colonel (United States, Peter Glenville)
- 1960: I Aim at the Stars (United States/GER, J. Lee Thompson)

== Awards and nominations ==
Year	Award	Category	Nominated work	Result
1943	15th Academy Awards	Best Screenplay (shared with James Hilton, Claudine West and Arthur Wimperis)	Mrs. Miniver	Won
1943	15th Academy Awards	Best Screenplay (shared with Claudine West and Arthur Wimperis)	Random Harvest	Nominated
1949	1st Writers Guild of America Awards	Best Written Film Concerning American Scene (shared with William R. Laidlaw)	Command Decision	Nominated
1949	1st Writers Guild of America Awards	Best Written Drama (shared with William R. Laidlaw)	Command Decision	Nominated
1959	11th Writers Guild of America Awards	Best Written American Comedy (shared with S. N. Behrman)	Me and the Colonel	Won
