= Lost Horizon =

1933 novel by the English writer James Hilton

- Dust jacket for the first edition.
- Author: James Hilton
- Audio read by: Michael de Morgan
- Language: English
- Genre: Fantasy, Fiction, novel, adventure, lost world, Utopian and dystopian fiction
- Set in: The Kunlun Mountains of Tibet, the British Raj, and Berlin
- Publisher: Macmillan
- Publication date: 1933 / 2010 (audiobook)
- Publication place: United Kingdom
- Media type: Print (hardback & paperback), Kindle eBook, audiobook
- Pages: ~160 pp. / 8 hrs and 26 mins
- ISBN: 978-1840243536 (UK); ISBN 978-0060594527 (US)
- OCLC: 4228377
- LC Class: PR6015.I53

Lost Horizon is a 1933 novel by the English writer James Hilton. The book was adapted into a film, also called Lost Horizon, in 1937 by director Frank Capra; and a musical film remake in 1973 by producer Ross Hunter with music by Burt Bacharach. It is the origin of Shangri-La, a fictional utopian lamasery located high in the mountains of Tibet.

The novel has a frame story set in Berlin, where a neurologist obtains a manuscript which records the narrative of a British diplomat who had disappeared in China. The main narrative depicted in the manuscript starts in May 1931 within the British Raj. There is a revolution in the country and several people are evacuated. A number of them are transported in a maharaja's aircraft, but the plane is hijacked. After a crash landing, the four surviving passengers are guided to Shangri-La in the Kuen-Lun mountain range.

== Plot ==
The prologue and epilogue are a frame story narrated by a neurologist. This neurologist and a novelist friend, Rutherford, are given dinner at Tempelhof, Berlin, by their old school-friend Wyland, a secretary at the British embassy. A chance remark by a passing airman brings up the topic of Hugh Conway, a British consul in Afghanistan, who disappeared under odd circumstances. Later in the evening, Rutherford reveals to the neurologist that, after the disappearance, he discovered Conway in a French mission hospital in Chung-Kiang (probably Chongqing), China, suffering from amnesia. Conway recovered his memory, told Rutherford his story (which Rutherford recorded in a manuscript), and then slipped away again.

Rutherford gives the neurologist his manuscript, which becomes the heart of the novel.

In May 1931, during the British Raj in India, the 80 White residents of Baskul are being evacuated to Peshawar because of a revolution. In the aeroplane of the Maharajah of Chandrapur are: Conway, the British consul, aged 37; Charles Mallinson, his young vice-consul; an American, Henry D. Barnard; and a British missionary, Miss Roberta Brinklow. The plane is hijacked and flown instead over the mountains to Tibet. After a crash landing, the Tibetan pilot dies, but not before telling the four (in "a kind of Chinese", which Conway barely understands) to seek shelter at the nearby lamasery of Shangri-La. The location is unclear, but Conway believes the plane has "progressed far beyond the western range of the Himalayas" towards the lesser known heights of the Kuen-Lun mountain range.

The four are taken there by a party directed by Chang, a postulant at the lamasery who speaks English. The lamasery has modern conveniences, like central heating, bathtubs from Akron, Ohio, a large library, a grand piano, a harpsichord, and food from the fertile valley below. Towering above is Karakal, literally translated as "Blue Moon," a mountain more than 28,000 feet high. Mallinson is keen to hire porters and leave, but Chang politely puts him off. The others eventually decide they are content to stay: Miss Brinklow because she wants to teach the people a sense of sin; Barnard because he is really Chalmers Bryant (wanted by the police for stock fraud) and because he is keen to develop the gold mines in the valley; and Conway because the contemplative scholarly life suits him.

A seemingly young Manchu woman, Lo-Tsen, is another postulant at the lamasery. She does not speak English, but plays the harpsichord. Mallinson falls in love with her, as does Conway, though more languidly. Conway is given an audience with the High Lama, an unheard-of honour. He learns that the lamasery was constructed in its present form in the early eighteenth century by a Catholic monk named Perrault from Luxembourg. The lamasery has since then been joined by others who have found their way into the valley. Once they have done so, their ageing slows; if they then leave the valley, they age quickly and die. Conway guesses correctly that the High Lama is Perrault, now 250 years old.

In a later audience, the High Lama reveals that he is finally dying, and that he wants Conway to lead the lamasery. The High Lama then dies. Conway contemplates the events.

Hours after the High Lama dies, Conway is outside still pondering the events while in the moonlight. Mallinson then grabs him by the arm and tells Conway he has arranged to leave the valley with porters and Lo-Tsen. Barnard and Brinklow have decided to stay. The porters and Lo-Tsen are waiting for him five kilometres outside the valley, but he cannot traverse the dangerous route alone, so he convinces Conway to go along and assist him. Conway is caught, divided between the two worlds. Ultimately, because of his love for the boy, he decides to join Mallinson. This ends Rutherford's manuscript.

The last time Rutherford saw Conway, it appeared he was preparing to make his way back to Shangri-La. Rutherford completes his account by telling the neurologist that he attempted to track Conway and verify some of his claims of Shangri-La. He found the Chung-Kiang doctor who had treated Conway. The doctor said Conway had been brought in by a Chinese woman, who was ill and died soon after. She was old, the doctor had told Rutherford, "Most old of anyone I have ever seen," implying that it was Lo-Tsen, aged drastically by her departure from Shangri-La. The narrator wonders whether Conway can find his way back to his lost paradise.

== Reception and legacy ==
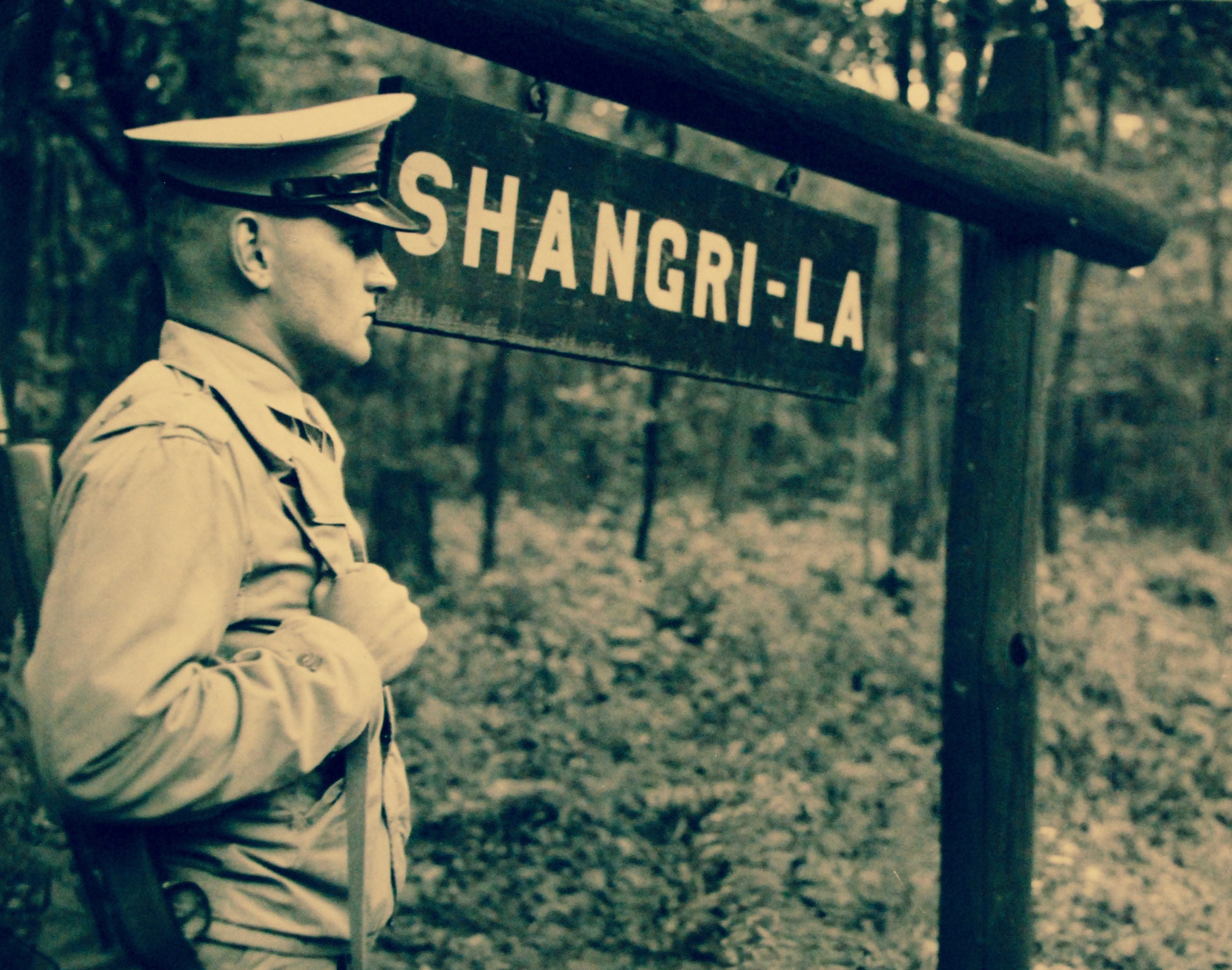
U.S. Marine standing guard at Shangri-La (1944)

The book, published in 1933, caught the notice of the public only after Hilton's Goodbye, Mr. Chips was published in 1934. Lost Horizon became a huge popular success and in 1939 was published in paperback form, as Pocket Book #1, making it the first "mass-market" paperback.

United States President Franklin D. Roosevelt named the Presidential hideaway in Maryland, now called Camp David, after Shangri-La. In 1942, to ensure the safety of returning U.S. forces, Roosevelt answered a reporter's question about the origin of the Doolittle Raid by saying it had been launched from "Shangri-La". The true details of the raid were revealed to the public a year later. This inspired the naming of the Essex-class aircraft carrier USS Shangri-La (CV-38), commissioned in 1944.

By the 1960s, Pocket Books alone, over the course of more than 40 printings, had sold several million copies of Lost Horizon, helping to make it one of the most popular novels of the 20th Century.

Lost Horizon's concept of Shangri-La has gone on to influence other quasi-Asian mystical locations in fiction including Marvel Comics' K'un-L'un and DC Comics' Nanda Parbat.

In 2001, the city of Zhongdian in Yunnan, China was renamed Shangri-La City to promote tourism.

== Adaptations ==
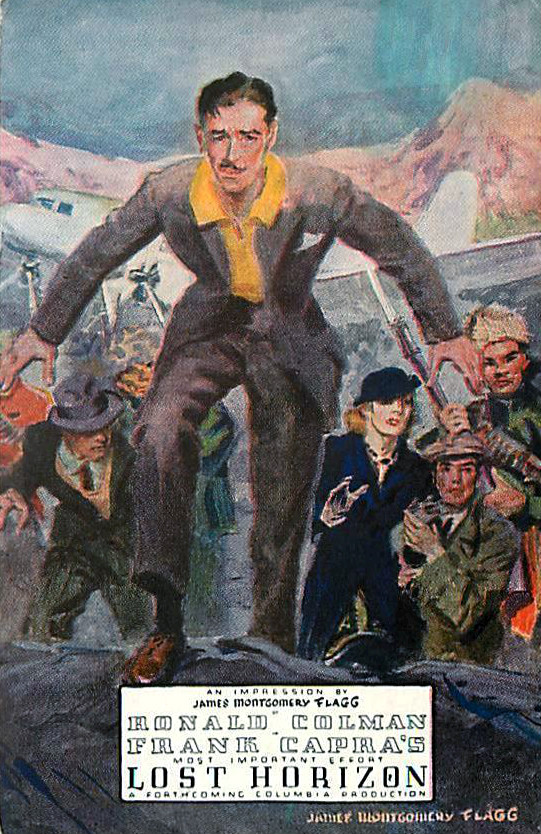
Promotional postcard for the 1937 film

=== Films ===
The book has been adapted for film:

- Lost Horizon (1937), directed by Frank Capra
- Lost Horizon (1973), directed by Charles Jarrott (musical version)

=== Radio ===
- A one-hour adaptation by James Hilton and Barbara Burnham was broadcast on the BBC National Programme at 20:30 on 1 August 1935, with a cast that included Esme Percy as the High Lama, Ben Welden as Barnard, Barbara Couper as Miss Brinklow, Jon Swinley as Conway and Cathleen Cordell as Lo Tsen. It was broadcast again on 2 August 1935, 30 and 31 January 1936, 30 October 1939 and 9 April 1945.
- Orson Welles directed and starred in an adaptation for the Campbell Playhouse, broadcast on 3 December 1939 with Sigrid Gurie.
- Ronald Colman reprised his screen role of Robert Conway a number of times for radio, including on the Lux Radio Theatre (15 September 1941), Academy Award (27 November 1946) and Favorite Story (24 July 1948).
- Herbert Marshall played Conway in Hallmark Playhouse's adaptation, broadcast on 30 December 1948.
- The NBC University Theater broadcast an adaptation on 10 September 1950.
- A 3-part serialization of the book by Malcolm Hulke and Paul Tabori was broadcast on the BBC Home Service 5–19 March 1966 featuring Gabriel Woolf as Conway, Alan Wheatley as the High Lama, Carleton Hobbs as Chang and Elizabeth Proud as Lo-Tsen. This adaptation was re-broadcast on BBC Radio 4's Sunday Play 18 May – 1 June 1969.
- Derek Jacobi starred as Hugh Conway and Alan Wheatley reprised his role as the High Lama pin a 3-part BBC Radio 4 Classic Serial adaptation dramatised by Barry Campbell. Originally broadcast 22 September – 4 October 1981, it was re-broadcast 8–10 September 2010 on BBC Radio 7, and again in March 2012, November 2014, June 2016, December 2019 and February 2026 on BBC Radio 4 Extra.

=== Musical ===
The book served as the basis for the unsuccessful 1956 Broadway musical Shangri-La.

== Publications ==
Lost Horizon is currently available in paperback format and is now published by Summersdale Publishers Ltd , ISBN 978-1-84024-353-6 and Vintage , ISBN 978-0-099-59586-1 in the UK and by Harper Perennial, ISBN 978-0-06-059452-7 in the United States.
