= The Silver Flame =

1928 novel

- 1950 edition
- Author: James Hilton
- Language: English
- Genre: Drama
- Publisher: Butterworth; Avon (US)
- Publication date: 1928
- Publication place: United Kingdom
- Media type: Print

The Silver Flame is a 1928 novel by the British writer James Hilton. The original British publisher was Butterworth. In 1949 it was published in the United States in by Avon under the alternative title Three Loves Had Margaret. It has been described as the last of his "apprentice novels" before he emerged as a major international author. The story takes place on a Cotswold estate between 1896 and 1926.

== Bibliography ==
- Hammond, John R. Lost Horizon Companion: A Guide to the James Hilton Novel and Its Characters, Critical Reception, Film Adaptations and Place in Popular Culture. McFarland, Incorporated, Publishers, 2008.
- Willison, I.R. (ed.) The New Cambridge Bibliography of English Literature: Volume 4, 1900-1950. Cambridge University Press, 1972.
