= William Henry Balgarnie =

British classical scholar (1869–1951)

- Born: 12 May 1869; Woolwich, England
- Died: 15 July 1951 (aged 82); Porthmadog, Wales
- Occupation: Schoolmaster

William Henry Balgarnie (12 May 1869 – 15 July 1951) was a schoolmaster at Elmfield College, Woodbridge School and The Leys School, and was the inspiration for the character Mr. Chips in the book Goodbye, Mr. Chips, written by one of his students at The Leys, James Hilton.

== Life ==
He was born at Woolwich, the son of a Presbyterian minister. Balgarnie studied at, and taught at, Elmfield College before going to The Leys. In the 1890s he would gather with other Old Elmfieldians in London for a country walk followed by tea, which was invariably accompanied with recitations and ballads around the piano.

Balgarnie was the first Elmfieldian M.A. (1891), and went from Elmfield to Fowey Grammar School, in Cornwall.

In 1894, Balgarnie was awarded a sizarship at Trinity College, Cambridge, from which he duly graduated with a first-class honours degree in classics. There he met W. W. Gibberd, a mathematician, through the Cambridge University Hare and Hounds, the cross-country club.

From 1898 to 1900 he worked as an assistant master at Woodbridge School. From 1900 till 1929 he was an assistant and housemaster at Leys school, senior classics master and for one year he served as a deputy Headmaster (1929–1930).

He was associated with three universities: he had MAs from London and Cambridge, and had worked for a year or two as an assistant Professor of Greek at Glasgow University under the young Gilbert Murray. His academic output included translations of Sophocles, Euripides and Lysias. He edited classical works, including Xenophon's Anabasis.

He died at Porthmadog, Wales, after a heart attack.

== Leysian links with Elmfield College ==
Balgarnie was educated at and himself taught at Elmfield. One Elmfieldian who followed him to The Leys was Harold Rose.

== In popular culture ==
Among Balgarnie's students was James Hilton, who said he based the character Mr. Chipping in his novel Goodbye Mr. Chips on Balgarnie.
