= The White Cliffs of Dover (film) =

1944 film by Clarence Brown

- Theatrical release poster
- Directed by: Clarence Brown
- Screenplay by: Claudine West; Jan Lustig; George Froeschel; Robert Nathan
- Based on: The White Cliffs (1940 verse novel) by Alice Duer Miller
- Produced by: Clarence Brown; Sidney Franklin
- Starring: Irene Dunne; Alan Marshal; Roddy McDowall
- Cinematography: George J. Folsey; Robert H. Planck
- Edited by: Robert Kern
- Music by: Herbert Stothart
- Production company: Metro-Goldwyn-Mayer
- Distributed by: Loew's Inc.
- Release date: May 11, 1944 (US)
- Running time: 126 min.
- Country: United States
- Language: English
- Budget: $2,342,000
- Box office: $4,045,000 (domestic) $2,249,000 (foreign)

The White Cliffs of Dover is a 1944 American war drama film based on the verse novel The White Cliffs by Alice Duer Miller. It was made by Metro-Goldwyn-Mayer, directed by Clarence Brown, and produced by Clarence Brown and Sidney Franklin. The screenplay was by Claudine West, Jan Lustig and George Froeschel, with the credit for additional poetry by Robert Nathan. Nathan stated in an interview that he wrote the screenplay as his first work as a contracted writer for MGM but the studio credited Claudine West, who had died in 1943, as a tribute to her.

During the 17th Academy Awards for films of 1944, it was nominated for Best Cinematography (Black-and-White) for George Folsey. The award, however, went to Joseph LaShelle for the film Laura.

== Plot ==
At the height of World War II, American-born Susan, Lady Ashwood, is a nurse in a British hospital, awaiting the arrival of 300 wounded men. Via flashback, she recalls how she came to Britain in 1914 with her father, small-town Rhode Island newspaper publisher Hiram P. Dunn, for a two week visit.

Old Colonel Forsythe introduces Susan to Sir John Ashwood, a baronet of the landed gentry with an estate and manor house. They fall in love, and despite friction over her American heritage, they marry. Their honeymoon is cut short when the Great War breaks out. John, an army officer, is posted to France with his regiment. Susan and John's mother, Lady Jean, receive the news that John's brother Reggie is killed in action. John finally gets a chance to be with Susan when he's granted leave and they reunite in Dieppe. During their stay, the United States declares war on Germany. Susan returns to Britain and has a son, also named John. Susan watches with her baby as newly arrived American troops parade through London.

The elder John is killed near the end of the fighting, never having seen his son. Susan remains in the Ashwood manor house with young John and Lady Jean. Having inherited the baronetcy, John is addressed as "Sir John", and takes seriously his duties as proprietor of the manor. He develops a childhood infatuation with Betsy Kenney, daughter of a tenant farmer. Young John invites two visiting German boys for tea, and the Ashwoods are shocked by their bellicose militaristic sentiments. Susan fears she will lose young John in another war. When Lady Jean dies, she decides to sell the manor and take John to America, but young John refuses to go, insisting if war comes he'll go into the army as his father did. They stay in Britain and at the outbreak of the Second World War Sir John becomes an officer, while his sweetheart Betsy becomes a Wren.

The flashback ends as wounded men arrive at Susan's hospital. John is among them, severely wounded and a doctor tells Susan John is dying. John tells her he was wounded at Dieppe and describes an American soldier who died near him. He speaks of the importance of winning a complete victory and a lasting peace. American soldiers parade through London, passing by the hospital. Susan proudly describes them to John as he dies.

=== Differences from source ===
The source poem has no mention of a romantic partner for Susan's son, John. The poem clearly states that John is following his father into the army, but ends with only Susan's fear that John might die in the war, not that he has even been sent to fight yet.

== Cast ==
- Irene Dunne as Susan Ashwood
- Alan Marshal as Sir John Ashwood
- Roddy McDowall as John Ashwood II as a boy
- Frank Morgan as Hiram Porter Dunn
- Van Johnson as Sam Bennett
- C. Aubrey Smith as Colonel Walter Forsythe
- Dame May Whitty as Nanny
- Gladys Cooper as Lady Jean Ashwood
- Peter Lawford as John Ashwood II as a young man
- John Warburton as Reggie Ashwood
- Jill Esmond as Rosamund
- Brenda Forbes as Gwennie
- Norma Varden as Mrs. Bland
- Edmund Breon as Major Rupert Bancroft (uncredited)
- Franklyn Farnum as Ball Guest (uncredited)
- June Lockhart as Betsy Kenney as an adult (uncredited)
- Miles Mander as Major Loring at Hospital (uncredited)
- J. Pat O'Malley as Martin (uncredited)
- Elizabeth Taylor as Betsy Kenney at age 10 (uncredited)
- Ian Wolfe as skipper of honeymoon boat (uncredited)
- Arthur Shields as Benson (uncredited)
- Bunny Gordon as John Ashwood II at age six months (uncredited)

== Production ==
The picture was released in May 1944, before the June 6 D-Day Allied landings in Normandy.

Among the many foreshadowings that would resonate with audiences is a scene set in the early 1930s, where two German brothers, sons of a prominent German manufacturer, visit the Ashwood estate. The younger boy remarks that the estate's large lawns would be ideal for military gliders to land - a premonition of the airborne attacks launched by Nazi Germany. His older brother instantly tries to defuse the situation—their father prepared them with stock answers for the trip. But when Hiram Dunn mentions Germany's loss of the last war, the boy explodes, revealing the indoctrination the boys have received from their Hitler Youth groups. The boys go off to play tennis, and Dunn tells his daughter that war is coming.

Herbert Stothart weaves a number of evocative pieces of music through his score, including: "Auld Lang Syne", "Hurrah Boys, for England", "Land of Hope and Glory", "My Country Tis of Thee"/"God Save the King", "Home! Sweet Home!", "Sweet Afton", "There's a Long, Long Trail", "Do ye Ken John Peel", "The Minstrel Boy to the War Has Gone", "Pack Up Your Troubles in Your Old Kit-Bag", "The Star Spangled Banner", "The Stars and Stripes Forever", "Over There", "Vive la Compagnie", "Coventry Carol" (Woe is me, poor child for thee), "America (My Country, 'Tis of Thee)", "Greensleeves" and "When Johnny Comes Marching Home".

John dies and the film ends as American troops march triumphantly past the hospital, the bands playing "When Johnny Comes Marching Home". The last shot of the film is of the men marching toward the audience.

The film was a key early credit for Peter Lawford.

== Box office ==
According to MGM records, the film was a big hit and earned $6,294,000 (equivalent to $115 million in 2025) at the box office, resulting in a profit of $1,784,000 (equivalent to $33 million in 2025).

The film was nominated for the Academy Award for Best Cinematography in Black and White.

== Adaptations ==
White Cliffs of Dover was adapted as a radio play on the September 18, 1946, episode of Academy Award Theater, starring Irene Dunne in her original film role.

== See also ==
- White Cliffs of Dover, the geologic formation.
