= Amara Deepam (1956 film) =

1956 film by T. Prakash Rao

- Theatrical release poster
- Directed by: T. Prakash Rao
- Screenplay by: T. Prakash Rao
- Story by: C. V. Sridhar
- Produced by: S. Krishnamoorthy; T. Govindarajan; C. V. Sridhar
- Starring: Sivaji Ganesan; Savitri; Padmini
- Cinematography: Kamal Ghosh; A. Vincent
- Edited by: N. M. Sankar
- Music by: T. Chalapathi Rao; G. Ramanathan; G. N. Balasubramaniam
- Production company: Venus Pictures
- Distributed by: Sivaji Films
- Release date: 29 June 1956
- Running time: 162 minutes
- Country: India
- Language: Tamil

Amara Deepam (transl. The Eternal Lamp) is a 1956 Indian Tamil-language romantic drama film directed and co-written by T. Prakash Rao. A remake of the 1942 American film Random Harvest, it stars Sivaji Ganesan, Savitri and Padmini. The film, produced by Venus Pictures, was released on 29 June 1956. It was remade in Hindi as Amardeep (1958).

== Plot ==
The parents of Aruna, a young woman from a wealthy family, attempt to force her into an arranged marriage with her cousin, Sukumar. His dictatorial behavior quickly offend her, but the final straw comes when he violently breaks her radio—which solidifies her resolve to escape. She leaves her home one night to escape from the marriage. She ends up being chased by some goons, and gets saved by a passerby Ashok. Suddenly, somebody hits Ashok on the head, which causes him to lose his memory. Later, he meets a woman in a gypsy camp called Rupa and falls for her. Aruna, however, cannot forget him and never ceases her search for him. She finally meets him at a show with Rupa. The climax centers on whether Ashok will finally regain his memory and where his ultimate loyalties will lie.

== Cast ==
Main cast

- Sivaji Ganesan as Ashok
- Savitri as Aruna
- Padmini as Roopa
- Nambiar as Sukumar
- Thangavelu
- E. V. Saroja as Shamba

Guest artiste

- V. Nagayya as Aruna's father

Supporting cast

- M. R. Santhanam, M. M. Venkatachalam Pillai, Jayasakthivel, Nambirajan, Kottapuli Jayaraman, V. P. Balaraman, K. S. Durai, C. V. Velappa, Baby Saroja, and Baby Kasthuri.

== Soundtrack ==
The music was composed by T. Chalapathi Rao. G. Ramanathan composed the music for one song "Nadodikkottam Nannga Thiillelelo" and Carnatic musician G. N. Balasubramaniam composed the music for "Enge Maraindhanayo". This song was tuned in the Carnatic raga Shubhapantuvarali. The kuthu song "Jalilo Jimkana" became popular, and inspired the title of the song "Jolly O Gymkhana" from Beast (2022).

Song	Singers	Lyrics	Length
"Nanaayam Manushanukku"	T. M. Soundararajan	K. S. Gopalakrishnan	02:43
"Jalilo Jimkana"	Jikki	Thanjai N. Ramaiah Dass	03:51
"Thenunnum Vandu Maamalarai Kandu"	A. M. Rajah & P. Susheela	K. P. Kamatchi Sundharam	03:34
"Ellorum Koodi Aadi Paadi"	Jikki	M. K. Athmanathan	03:56
"Nadodikkottam Nannga Thiillelelo"	T. M. Soundararajan, A. P. Komala, Sirkazhi Govindarajan & T. V. Rathnam	Udumalai Narayana Kavi	05:41
"Pachchai Kilipaadudhu"	Jikki	A. Maruthakasi	03:13
"Kondaikatti Kaavikatti"	S. C. Krishnan & A. P. Komala	K. S. Gopalakrishnan	03:37
"Thumbam Soozhum Neram"	Jikki	K. S. Gopalakrishnan	02:11
"Enge Maraindhanayo"	M. L. Vasanthakumari	K. S. Gopalakrishnan	03:09

== Release and reception ==
Amara Deepam was released on 29 June 1956. The Hindu wrote, "Interesting melodrama, packed with cleverly-contrived situations." The Mail wrote, "Savithri as Aruna and Padmini as Rupa are striking in their trying roles, and their actions are moving. Sivaji Ganesan, as Ashok, gives a talk on labour rights, which arrests one's attention." Screen wrote, "Amara Deepam produced essentially as an entertainer, has achieved its purpose to a great extent". Kanthan of Kalki appreciated the film for various aspects, including Sridhar's writing, the songs and the cast performances. The Indian Express wrote, "This is a picture of which the Tamil film world could be legitimately be proud – such is the vivid portrayal on the screen of gripping theme." The film was a commercial success, running for over 100 days in theatres.

== Bibliography ==
- Rajadhyaksha, Ashish; Willemen, Paul (1998) [1994]. Encyclopaedia of Indian Cinema. British Film Institute and Oxford University Press. ISBN 0-19-563579-5.
