= Morning Journey =

1951 novel

- American cover
- Author: James Hilton
- Language: English
- Genre: Drama
- Publisher: Macmillan (UK); Little, Brown (US)
- Publication date: 1951
- Publication place: United Kingdom
- Media type: Print

Morning Journey is a 1951 novel by the British writer James Hilton. It was published in London by Macmillan and in New York by Little, Brown and Company. It received positive reviews on its release and was influenced by Hilton's own time in Hollywood as a screenwriter. It was Hilton's penultimate novel, followed by Time and Time Again in 1953.

== Synopsis ==
The plot looks back over the lifetime of the Irish actress Carey Arundel critically acclaimed star of the film Morning Journey, and her youthful marriage to Paul Saffron a gifted theatre producer and their subsequent separation.

== Bibliography ==
- Hammond, John R. Lost Horizon Companion: A Guide to the James Hilton Novel and Its Characters, Critical Reception, Film Adaptations and Place in Popular Culture. McFarland, Incorporated, Publishers, 2008.
- Willison, I.R. (ed.) The New Cambridge Bibliography of English Literature: Volume 4, 1900-1950. Cambridge University Press, 1972.
