= Knight Without Armour (novel) =

Book by James Hilton

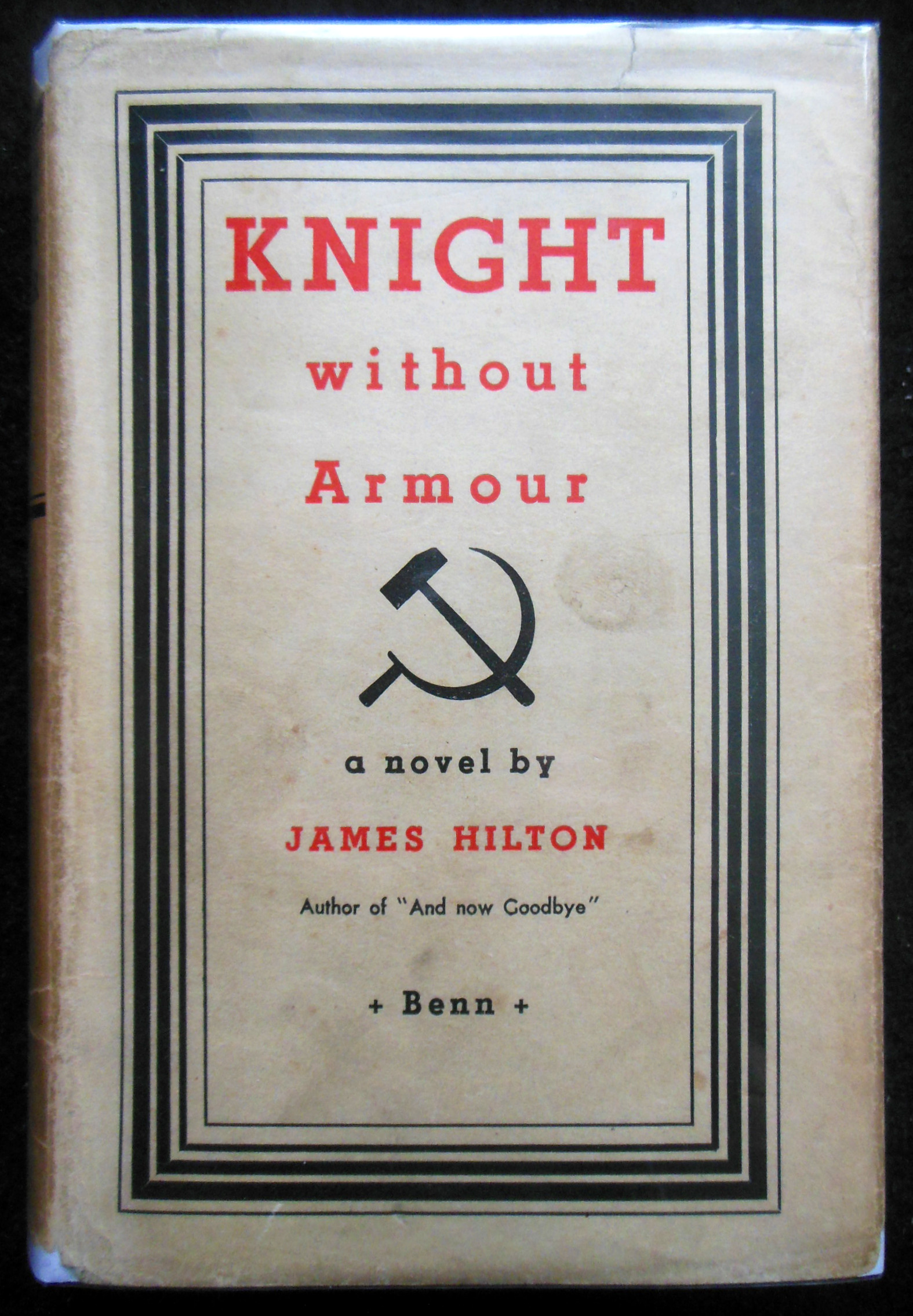
- Author: James Hilton
- Language: English
- Publication date: 1933

Knight without Armour (published in the U.S. as without Armor) is a British thriller novel by James Hilton, first published in 1933. A British secret agent in Russia rescues the daughter of a Tsarist minister from a group of Bolshevik revolutionaries.

== Adaptation ==
The novel was the basis for the 1937 British film Knight without Armour directed by Jacques Feyder and starring Marlene Dietrich and Robert Donat. It was made at Denham Studios by Alexander Korda's London Films. Hilton's original story was adapted into a screenplay by Frances Marion, Lajos Bíró and Arthur Wimperis.

== Bibliography ==
- Head, Dominic. The Cambridge Guide to Literature in English. Cambridge University Press, 2006.
