= Hallmark Playhouse =

American old-time radio dramatic anthology series

Hallmark Playhouse / Hallmark Hall of Fame
- Genre: Dramatic anthology
- Running time: 30 minutes
- Country of origin: United States
- Language: English
- Syndicates: CBS
- TV adaptations: Hallmark Hall of Fame
- Hosted by: James Hilton
- Announcer: Frank Goss
- Written by: Jack Rubin; Jean Holloway
- Directed by: Bill Gay
- Produced by: Dee Engelbach; Bill Gay
- Original release: June 10, 1948 – March 27, 1957
- Sponsored by: Hallmark Cards

Hallmark Playhouse is an American old-time radio dramatic anthology series. It was broadcast on CBS from June 10, 1948 until February 1, 1953, and was described by one author as "a program that consistently produced the highest levels of production quality and value." Beginning on February 8, 1953, the program underwent changes of title, host, and format. It was broadcast as The Hallmark Hall of Fame until March 27, 1955, still on CBS.

== Playhouse format ==
Hallmark Playhouse began as a summer replacement for Radio Reader's Digest, which Hallmark had also sponsored. Company officials decided to keep it for the fall of 1948 and drop its predecessor. An article in the trade publication Billboard reported that Hallmark executives preferred not to continue sharing product identification with Reader's Digest. The new show broadcast adaptations of works — some obscure and some well-known — from drama and literature.

== Personnel ==
James Hilton was the host of Hallmark Playhouse. Hollywood stars often had leading roles in episodes. Among those starring were Ethel Barrymore, Ronald Colman, Joan Fontaine, Gregory Peck, and Jane Wyman. Frank Gast was the announcer. Lyn Murray provided the music. Dee Engelbach and Bill Gay were the producers. Writers included Jack Rubin and Jean Holloway.

== Episodes ==
In the reference work On the Air: The Encyclopedia of Old-Time Radio, radio historian John Dunning wrote that host Hilton would choose material to be adapted for the broadcasts: "Hilton announced plans to 'ransack' the past and search out never-before-broadcast tales from the 2,000-year history of written literature." That goal was missed, however, at the beginning; "The Devil and Daniel Webster", by Stephen Vincent Benét was the program's premiere episode, and it had already been presented on radio by Columbia Workshop.

"The Story of Silent Night", presented in 1946 was cited by John V. Pavlik in his book, Masterful Stories: Lessons from Golden Age Radio. "History comes alive," Pavlik wrote, "through the production's rigorous research, splendid dialogue, and beautiful orchestrations, including acoustical guitar and song, especially as sung by a children's group." He added that the episode's musical arrangements and orchestrations "underscore the extraordinary resources, intellectual capital, and pure talent that went into creating a program such as the Hallmark Playhouse ..."

Other stories adapted for the program included "Penny Serenade", Pride and Prejudice, The Citadel, and Parnassus on Wheels.

Other episodes included "Home to Thanksgiving" on November 23, 1950, with Wyman.

== Hall of Fame ==
Unlike the focus on classical literature and drama of its predecessor, Hallmark Hall of Fame featured stories about people from America's past. Subjects of episodes included Lee de Forest and Mary Todd Lincoln.

=== Personnel ===
Lionel Barrymore was the host of Hallmark Hall of Fame. Frank Goss was the announcer, and Bill Gay directed.

=== Critical reception ===
In the September 15, 1951, issue of Billboard, Bob Francis reviewed the opening episode of the 1951–1952 season of Hallmark Playhouse, an adaptation of J. M. Barrie's Quality Street that starred Deborah Kerr. Francis wrote, "The air adaptation was exceedingly well put together, keeping the story line clear and retaining the quaint flavor of the original Barrie lines." He also commended the program's advertising, writing that Hallmark commercials "were well-spaced and timed — dignified attention-getters without distracting from the interest in the story."

=== Recognition ===
In 1952, Hallmark Playhouse was among the winners of Radio Honor Medals from the Freedoms Foundation.
