= Claudine West =

British novelist and screenwriter

- Born: 16 January 1890; Nottingham, Nottinghamshire, United Kingdom
- Died: 11 April 1943 (aged 53); Beverly Hills, California, United States
- Other name: Ivy Claudine Godber
- Occupation: Screenwriter
- Years active: 1929–1943 (film)

Claudine West (16 January 1890 – 11 April 1943) was a British novelist and screenwriter who was a three-time Academy Award nominee. She moved to Hollywood in 1929, and was employed by MGM on many films, including some of their biggest productions of the late 1930s and early 1940s.

She frequently wrote scripts in European settings, including British-themed films Goodbye, Mr. Chips (nominated for an Academy Award) and The White Cliffs of Dover.

In 1942, West won an Oscar for her work on World War II drama Mrs. Miniver.

== Personal life ==
West was born on 16 January 1884 in Nottingham, England.

West died in Beverly Hills, California on 11 April 1943 after "a long illness."

== Selected filmography ==
- The Last of Mrs. Cheyney (1929)
- The High Road (1930)
- The Guardsman (1931)
- Son of India (1931)
- Jenny Lind (1932)
- Payment Deferred (1932)
- Reunion in Vienna (1933)
- The Barretts of Wimpole Street (1934)
- The Dark Angel (1935)
- The Good Earth (1937)
- Marie Antoinette (1938)
- Goodbye, Mr. Chips (1939) – Nominated for the Academy Award for Best Adapted Screenplay
- The Mortal Storm (1940)
- Random Harvest (1942) - Academy Award nominee
- Mrs. Miniver (1942) – Won the Academy Award for Best Adapted Screenplay
- The White Cliffs of Dover (1944)

== Bibliography ==
- Calder, Robert L. Beware the British Serpent: The Role of Writers in British Propaganda in the United States, 1939-1945. McGill-Queen's Press, 2004.
