= Goodbye, Mr. Chips =

1934 novella by James Hilton

- Cover of the UK first edition
- Author: James Hilton
- Illustrator: Ethel "Bip" Pares
- Series: Mr. Chips
- Genre: Psychological fiction
- Publisher: Little, Brown (US); Hodder & Stoughton (UK)
- Publication date: June 1934 (US); October 1934 (UK)
- Publication place: UK
- Media type: Novel
- Pages: 127
- OCLC: 8462789
- Dewey Decimal: 823.912
- LC Class: PR6015.I53 G6
- Followed by: To You, Mr Chips

Goodbye, Mr. Chips is a novella about the life of a school teacher, Mr. Chipping, written by British-American writer James Hilton. It has been adapted into two feature films and two television presentations.

== History ==
The story was originally issued in 1933, as a supplement to the British Weekly, an evangelical newspaper. It came to prominence when it was reprinted as the lead piece of the April 1934 issue of The Atlantic Monthly. The success of the Atlantic Monthly publication prompted a book deal between the author and the US publisher Little, Brown and Company, who published the story in book form for the first time in June 1934. Published during the Great Depression, Little, Brown cautiously released a small first print run. Public demand for more was immediate and Little, Brown went into an almost immediate reprinting the same month. Public demand remained strong, and Little, Brown continued to reprint the book in cautious lots for many months, with at least two reprintings per month.

The first British edition went to press in October 1934. The publishers were Hodder & Stoughton, who had observed the success of the book in the United States, and they released a much larger first print run. It sold 15,000 copies on the day of publication, and they quickly found themselves going into reprints as the reading public's demand for the book proved insatiable. With the huge success of this book, James Hilton became a best-selling author. In 1938, he published a sequel, To You, Mr Chips.

== Plot summary ==
The novella tells the story of a beloved school teacher, Mr Chipping, and his long tenure at Brookfield School, a fictional second-tier British boys' public boarding school located in the fictional village of Brookfield in the Fenlands. Mr Chips, as the boys call him, is conventional in his beliefs and exercises firm discipline in the classroom. His views broaden, and his pedagogical manner loosens after he marries Katherine, a young woman whom he meets on holiday in the Lake District. Katherine charms the Brookfield teachers and headmaster and quickly wins the favour of Brookfield's pupils. Their marriage is brief. She dies in childbirth, and he never remarries or has another romantic interest.

One of the themes of the book is that Chipping so outlasts all of his peers that his brief marriage fades into myth and few people know him as anything other than a confirmed and lonely bachelor. Despite Chipping's mediocre credentials and his view that classic Greek and Latin (his academic subjects) should be taught using obsolete instructional methods, he is an effective teacher who becomes highly regarded by pupils and the school's governors—he has become a well-worn institution. In his later years, he develops an arch sense of humour that pleases everyone. However, he also becomes somewhat of an anachronism, and is pitied for his isolation. On his deathbed, he talks of the fulfillment he felt as a teacher of boys.

== Inspiration ==
The setting for Goodbye, Mr. Chips is probably based on The Leys School, Cambridge, where James Hilton was a pupil (1915–18). Hilton is reported to have said that the inspiration for the protagonist, Mr. Chips, came from many sources, including his father, who was the headmaster of Chapel End School. Mr. Chips is also likely to have been based on W. H. Balgarnie, a master at The Leys (1900–30), who was in charge of the Leys Fortnightly (in which Hilton's first short stories and essays were published.) Over the years, old boys wrote to Geoffery Houghton, a master at The Leys and a historian of the school, confirming the links between Chipping and Balgarnie, who eventually died at Porthmadog at the age of 82. Balgarnie had been linked with the school for 51 years and spent his last years in modest lodgings nearby. Like Mr. Chips, Balgarnie was a strict disciplinarian, but would also invite boys to visit him for tea and biscuits.

Hilton wrote upon Balgarnie's death that "Balgarnie was, I suppose, the chief model for my story. When I read so many other stories about public school life, I am struck by the fact that I suffered no such purgatory as their authors apparently did, and much of this miracle was due to Balgarnie." The mutton chop side whiskers of one of the masters at The Leys earned him the nickname "Chops", a likely inspiration for Mr Chips' name.

In Hilton’s final novel, Time and Time Again (1953), protagonist Charles Anderson bears clear biographical similarities to Hilton himself. Early in the novel, Anderson briefly reminisces about attending Brookfield and knowing "Chips".

== Adaptations ==
=== Radio ===
A 50-minute adaptation by James Hilton and Barbara Burnham was broadcast on the BBC National Programme at 20:00 on 23 July 1936, with Richard Goolden in the title part and a cast that included Norman Shelley, Ronald Simpson, Lewis Shaw and Hermione Hannen. There was a repeat broadcast the following evening.

A radio adaptation by the Lux Radio Theatre starring Laurence Olivier and Edna Best and presented by Cecil B. DeMille was first broadcast on 20 November 1939.

A radio adaptation by Hallmark Playhouse starring Ronald Colman was broadcast on 16 September 1948. Jean Holloway wrote the adaptation, Dee Engelbach was the producer and director, and James Hilton was the host. A second version, told from the point of view of Mrs. Chips as portrayed by Deborah Kerr, was broadcast on 1 February 1951. Whitfield Connor was Mr. Chips, Leonard St. Clair wrote the adaptation, Bill Gay was the producer and director, and James Hilton was again the host.

A radio adaptation by the NBC University Theatre was broadcast on 10 July 1949, starring Herbert Marshall and Alma Lawton. Agnes Eckhardt wrote the adaptation, and Andrew C. Love was the director.

A radio adaptation in two parts by Margaret Simpson was broadcast on BBC Radio 4 in October 1980 and was rebroadcast by BBC Radio 4 Extra in September 2005 and again in September 2025.

=== Theatre ===
Barbara Burnham adapted the book for a stage production in three acts, which was first performed at the Shaftesbury Theatre on 23 September 1938, with Leslie Banks as Mr. Chips and Constance Cummings as his wife Katherine. It ran for over 100 performances until 14 January 1939.

A stage musical based on the original novel, but using most of the Leslie Bricusse vocal score of the 1969 film, was mounted at the Chichester Festival and opened on 11 August 1982. The book was by Roland Starke and the production was directed by Patrick Garland and Christopher Selbie. Among the Chichester Festival cast were John Mills as Mr. Chips, Colette Gleeson as Kathie, Nigel Stock as Max, Michael Sadler, Paul Hardwick, Simon Butteriss and Robert Meadmore in supporting roles, and 20 local school boys, including Kevin Farrar who was selected by Bricusse to sing the final verse of the iconic "School Song". The original cast album was recorded on the That's Entertainment Records label TER 1025 at Abbey Roads Studios in London on 17/18 August 1982. JAY-jay Records also have a release of it.

=== Film ===
==== 1939 film ====
This version stars Robert Donat, Greer Garson, Terry Kilburn, John Mills, and Paul Henreid. Donat won an Academy Award for Best Actor for his performance in the lead role, beating Clark Gable, James Stewart, Laurence Olivier, and Mickey Rooney. While some of the incidents depicted in the various screen adaptations do not appear in the book, this film is generally faithful to the original story. The exteriors of the buildings of the fictional Brookfield School were filmed at Repton School, an independent school (at the time of filming, for boys only), located in the village of Repton, in Derbyshire, in the Midlands area of England, whilst the interiors, school courtyards and annexes, including the supposedly exterior shots of the Austrian Tyrol Mountains, were filmed at Denham Film Studios, near the village of Denham in Buckinghamshire. Around 200 boys from Repton School stayed on during the school holidays so that they could appear in the film.

==== 1969 film ====
In 1969 a musical film version appeared, starring Peter O'Toole and Petula Clark, with songs by Leslie Bricusse and an underscore by John Williams. In this version the character of Katherine is greatly expanded, and the time setting of the story is moved forward several decades, with Chips' career beginning in the early 20th century and his later career covering World War II, rather than World War I. O'Toole and Clark's performances were widely praised. At the 42nd Academy Awards, O'Toole was nominated for the Academy Award for Best Actor, and he won the Golden Globe Award for Best Actor in a Musical or Comedy.

=== Television ===
==== 1984 series ====
In 1984 it was adapted as a television serial by the BBC. It starred Roy Marsden and Jill Meager and ran for six half-hour episodes. Many scenes were filmed at Repton School, Derbyshire, in an effort to remain faithful to the original film.

==== 2002 series ====
A television film adaptation was produced by STV Studios (then known as "SMG TV Productions") in 2002. It aired on the ITV Network in Britain and on PBS's Masterpiece Theatre in the United States. It starred Martin Clunes and Victoria Hamilton with Henry Cavill, William Moseley, Oliver Rokison and Harry Lloyd.

=== Parodies ===
Goodbye, Mr. Chips was parodied in the British sketch comedy programmes Hale and Pace (as Piss Off, Mr. Chips) and Big Train.

Vince Gilligan created the television show Breaking Bad with the premise that the show's protagonist Walter White would turn "From Mr. Chips to Scarface" through the series' course.

In the Marx Brothers film At the Circus, as Groucho Marx is about to walk out of a scene, he shakes hands with a nearby caged monkey and says, "Goodbye, Mister Chimps."

In 2009, the short-running ABC sitcom Better Off Ted titled its 6th episode "Goodbye, Mr. Chips" wherein the computer system misidentifies then completely deletes the account of Ted Crisp, the main character.

== See also ==
- 1934 in literature
- To Serve Them All My Days
