= Hands Across the Sea (play) =

Play by Noël Coward

Gertrude Lawrence and Everley Gregg in Hands Across the Sea

Hands Across the Sea, described by the author as "a comedy of bad manners", is a one-act play by Noël Coward, one of ten that make up Tonight at 8.30, a cycle written to be performed across three evenings. (Note: One of the ten, Star Chamber, was given one performance and immediately dropped; it is seldom revived, and throughout Coward's lifetime the published texts of the cycle omitted it.) One-act plays were unfashionable in the 1920s and 30s, but Coward was fond of the genre and conceived the idea of a set of short pieces to be played across several evenings. The actress most closely associated with him was Gertrude Lawrence, and he wrote the plays as vehicles for them both.

The play, widely seen as caricaturing Coward's friends Lord Louis Mountbatten and his wife, Edwina, depicts an upper class couple and their haphazard and chaotic reception of guests in their drawing room.

The play was first produced in 1935 in Manchester and then toured for nine weeks before opening in London (1936) and New York (1936–37). It has been revived occasionally and has been adapted for television and radio.

== Background and first productions ==
Short plays had been popular in the previous century, often as curtain-raisers and afterpieces to longer plays. By the 1920s they had gone out of fashion, but Coward was fond of the genre and wrote several early in his career. He wrote, "A short play, having a great advantage over a long one in that it can sustain a mood without technical creaking or over padding, deserves a better fate, and if, by careful writing, acting and producing I can do a little towards reinstating it in its rightful pride, I shall have achieved one of my more sentimental ambitions." In 1935 he conceived the idea of a set of short plays, to run in varying permutations on three consecutive nights at the theatre. His biographer Philip Hoare describes it as "a bold idea, risky and innovative". Coward finished writing all ten of the plays by the end of August 1935.

The actress most closely associated with Coward was Gertrude Lawrence, his oldest friend, with whom he had first acted as a child in Hannele in 1913. They starred together in his revue London Calling! (1923) and his comedy Private Lives (1930–31), and he wrote the Tonight at 8.30 plays "as acting, singing and dancing vehicles for Gertrude Lawrence and myself". Coward directed the plays as well as acting in them. They were performed in various combinations of three. (Note: The programme of plays chosen for each performance was advertised in advance.)

Hands Across the Sea was first presented on 18 October 1935 at the Opera House, Manchester, the first play in a programme that also contained Fumed Oak and Shadow Play. The first London performance was on 13 January 1936, when the three plays opened at the Phoenix Theatre. The cycle played to full houses, and the limited season closed on 20 June, after 157 performances. (Note: Coward, who disliked long runs, and also needed to set aside time to write and compose, usually insisted on playing a part for no longer than six months: "preferably three months in New York and three months in London".) The Broadway premiere was at the National Theatre on 27 November 1936, with mostly the same cast as in London. As in the Manchester and London premieres, the programme also included We Were Dancing and Red Peppers. The New York run of the cycle, a limited season, as in London, ended prematurely because Coward was taken ill. (Note: The play closed for a week at the beginning of March because Coward was unwell. It was announced that he was suffering from laryngitis, but in fact it was a nervous breakdown, brought on by overwork. The run resumed on 8 March, but after two performances Coward's doctor insisted that he withdraw completely, and the last Broadway performance was given on 9 March.)

The main characters, a British couple, Commander Peter Gilpin and his wife Lady Maureen ("Piggie") Gilpin, were widely recognised as caricatures of Coward's friends Lord Louis ("Dickie") Mountbatten and his wife Edwina, who, Coward later said, "used to give cocktail parties and people used to arrive that nobody had ever heard of and sit about and go away again; somebody Dickie had met somewhere, or somebody Edwina had met – and nobody knew who they were. We all talked among ourselves, and it was really a very very good basis for a light comedy." Mountbatten, in mock indignation, called it "a bare-faced parody of our lives, with Gertie Lawrence playing Lady Maureen Gilpin and Noël Coward playing me. Absolutely outrageous...!"

== Roles and original cast ==
- Walters – Moya Nugent
- Lady Maureen Gilpin (Piggie) – Gertrude Lawrence
- Commander Peter Gilpin, R.N. – Noël Coward
- Lieut.-Commander Alastair Corbett, R.N. – Edward Underdown
- Mrs Wadhurst – Alison Leggatt (Joyce Carey in New York)
- Mr Wadhurst – Alan Webb
- Mr Burnham – Kenneth Carten
- The Hon. Clare Wedderburn – Everley Gregg (Joan Swinstead in New York)
- Major Bogey Gosling – Anthony Pelissier

== Plot ==
In the drawing room of the Gilpins' stylish Mayfair flat in London, Walters, the maid, takes a telephone message for her employers. The caller is Mrs. Rawlingson with whom Maureen "Piggie" Gilpin and her friend Maud Dalborough once stayed when temporarily stranded in Samolo in the South Pacific during a world cruise. On seeing the message, Piggie explains to her husband, Commander Peter Gilpin, RN, that Mrs Rawlingson and her husband are visiting London and, having asked them to tea, Piggie has forgotten the appointment until now (extending or accepting and then forgetting invitations is a habit of hers). She makes urgent phone calls to recruit friends to join her to entertain the Rawlingsons, and Peter persuades a naval colleague to invite the visitors to tour the naval dockyard at Portsmouth during their stay.

As soon as the Gilpins leave the room, Walters ushers in Mr and Mrs Wadhurst, a couple whom Piggie and Maud met in Malaya. As with the Rawlingsons, Piggie has invited them to tea and then forgotten about the appointment. Another visitor is shown in: Mr Burnham, a young employee of a company that is designing a speed boat for Peter. He and the Wadhursts make polite, slightly stiff conversation. While they wait for the Gilpins to appear, Clare Wedderburn and Bogey Gosling, close friends of the Gilpins, arrive. Clare and Bogey make themselves loudly at home and liberally hand round cocktails.

Piggie enters, greets her old friends and welcomes the Wadhursts, whom she mistakes for the Rawlingsons. Conversation is continually interrupted by the telephone on which Piggie and later Peter and Clare are called to talk to other friends, which they do uninhibitedly, to the confusion of the Wadhursts. At one point, Burnham rises and tries to give Peter a long roll of cardboard, but is thwarted when Peter is again called to the telephone. The conversation is interrupted again when Piggie takes a call from Mrs. Rawlingson, who apologises that she and her husband cannot come after all. Piggie, realising her error, tries to discover tactfully who the Wadhursts actually are. Just as they are about to leave to go to the theatre, Mrs Wadhurst mentions Pendarla, where she and Wadhurst live. This finally jogs Piggie's memory, and she bids them an effusive farewell, inviting them to dine one evening and go to the theatre. She and the Wadhursts leave the room.

Clare, like Piggie, has assumed that Burnham is the Wadhursts' son. She is puzzled when he does not leave with them. He explains who he is, and that he has brought the designs for Peter's new boat. Piggie, meanwhile, takes another telephone call and apologises to her caller for forgetting their engagement that afternoon. As Burnham creeps out, she, still unaware that he is not the Wadhursts' son, bids him goodbye: "It's been absolutely lovely, you're the sweetest family I've ever met in my life."

== Reception ==
The Times said of the play: "As a piece of production it is, technically, of the utmost brilliance; as an entertainment, in its own kind frothily faultless." Coward's fellow-dramatist Terence Rattigan considered it "the best short comedy ever written." In the introduction to his collected plays Coward comments:

It is a gay, unpretentious little play, and it was acted by Gertie with incomparable brilliance. I cannot think of it without remembering the infinite variety of her inflections; her absurd scatterbrained conversations on the telephone; her frantic desire to be hospitable and charming and her expression of blank dismay when she suddenly realised that her visitors were not who she thought they were at all.

== Revivals and adaptations ==
=== Theatre ===
In 1936 Sybil Thorndike and Lewis Casson led a British tour of the play, in a programme with Fumed Oak and Bernard Shaw's Village Wooing. (Note: Coward quipped, "Two of my plays and one of his: that fairly puts Mr Shaw in his place", although in reality he respected and admired Shaw.) In 1937 a company headed by Estelle Winwood and Robert Henderson toured the Tonight at 8.30 cycle in the US and Canada. In their production of Hands Across the Sea, Winwood played Piggie and Bramwell Fletcher her husband. In 1938 Fay Compton led an Australian tour in which Hands Across the Sea was presented together with Still Life and Red Peppers. Michael Wilding played Peter to her Piggie.

Hands Across the Sea was included in the set of six plays from Tonight at 8.30 in an American tour starring Lawrence, with Graham Payn as co-star, directed by Coward. It played at the National Theatre in February and March 1947.

In 2000, the Williamstown Theatre Festival revived Hands Across the Sea and five other plays from the cycle. In 1981 at the Lyric Theatre in London Hands Across the Sea was given along with Shadow Play and Red Peppers, starring John Standing and Estelle Kohler. At the Chichester Festival in 2006 Hands Across the Sea was staged, as were five other plays from the cycle. (Note: The Astonished Heart, Red Peppers, Family Album, Fumed Oak and Shadow Play.) Josefina Gabrielle and Alexander Hanson played the leading roles. The Antaeus Company in Los Angeles revived all ten plays of the cycle in October 2007, and the Shaw Festival did so in 2009.

In the first professional revival of the cycle in Britain, (Note: Omitting Star Chamber.) given by English Touring Theatre in 2014 Kirsty Besterman played Piggy. In London, nine of the ten plays in the cycle were given at the Jermyn Street Theatre in 2018. (Note: The omitted play was Fumed Oak.) In Hands Across the Sea Miranda Foster and Stefan Bednarczyk played the Gilpins.

=== Television and radio ===
Hands Across the Sea was adapted for BBC television in 1938, with Nadine March and Nicholas Phipps as the Gilpins. Three members of the 1936 West End cast, Eveley Gregg, Alan Webb and Edward Underdown, played their original roles. In 1991 BBC television mounted productions of the individual plays of the cycle, starring Joan Collins. Hands Across the Sea was chosen to open the series. John Nettles played Peter to Collins's Piggie. BBC radio broadcast an adaptation in 1999 as part of the celebrations of the Coward centenary; Stephanie Beacham and Michael Cochrane played the Gilpins.

== Notes, references and sources ==
=== Sources ===
- Castle, Charles (1972). Noël. London: W H Allen. ISBN 978-0-491-00534-0.
- Coward, Noël (1979). Plays: 3. London: Methuen. ISBN 978-0-413-46100-1.
- Hoare, Philip (1995). Noël Coward, A Biography. London: Sinclair-Stevenson. ISBN 978-1-4081-0675-4.
- Morley, Sheridan (1974) [1969]. A Talent to Amuse. London: Penguin. ISBN 978-0-14-003863-7.
- Morley, Sheridan (1999). "Introduction". Coward: Plays 7. London: Bloomsbury. ISBN 978-0-4137-3400-6.
- Morley, Sheridan (2005). Noël Coward. London: Haus Publishing. ISBN 978-1-90-434188-8.
