= Shadow Play (play) =

Play by Noël Coward

Gertrude Lawrence and Noël Coward in the original production of Shadow Play

Shadow Play, described by the author as "a musical fantasy", is a one-act play by Noël Coward, one of ten (Note: One of the ten, Star Chamber, was given one performance and immediately dropped; it is seldom revived, and throughout Coward's lifetime the published texts of the cycle omitted it.) that make up Tonight at 8.30, a cycle written to be performed across three evenings. Short plays were unfashionable in the 1920s and 30s, but Coward was fond of the genre and conceived the idea of a set of brief pieces to be played across several evenings. The actress most closely associated with him was Gertrude Lawrence, and he wrote the ten plays as vehicles for them both.

Shadow Play depicts a husband and wife in a marriage on the brink of collapse. Under the influence of an unwisely large dose of sleeping pills, the wife has a dream that retells their story in hallucinatory form. Musical intervals weave in and out of the dream. The husband is so concerned for his wife's condition that his love is rekindled, and when she comes round they are reconciled.

The play was first produced in 1935 in Manchester and then toured for nine weeks before opening in London (1936) and New York (1936–37), where the cycle played to full houses. Shadow Play has enjoyed several major revivals and has been adapted for television and radio.

== Background and first productions ==
Short plays had been popular in the previous century, often as curtain-raisers and afterpieces to longer plays. By the 1920s they had gone out of fashion, but Coward was fond of the genre and wrote several early in his career. He wrote, "A short play, having a great advantage over a long one in that it can sustain a mood without technical creaking or over padding, deserves a better fate, and if, by careful writing, acting and producing I can do a little towards reinstating it in its rightful pride, I shall have achieved one of my more sentimental ambitions." In 1935 he conceived the idea of a set of short plays, to run in varying permutations on three consecutive nights at the theatre. His biographer Philip Hoare describes it as "a bold idea, risky and innovative".

The actress most closely associated with Coward was Gertrude Lawrence, his oldest friend, with whom he had first acted as a child in Hannele in 1913. They starred together in his revue London Calling! (1923) and his comedy Private Lives (1930–31), and he wrote the Tonight at 8.30 plays "as acting, singing and dancing vehicles for Gertrude Lawrence and myself". Coward directed the plays as well as acting in them. They were performed in various combinations of three. (Note: The programme of plays chosen for each performance was advertised in advance.) Shadow Play was first presented on 18 October 1935 at the Opera House, Manchester, the final play in a programme that also contained Hands Across the Sea and Fumed Oak. It is one of four plays in the cycle that "break into spontaneous song ... in the most unexpected places".

The first London performance was on 18 January 1936 at the Phoenix Theatre. The cycle played to full houses, and the limited season closed on 20 June, after 157 performances. (Note: The London run was interrupted when Lawrence became ill from overwork while shooting a film at the same time. Coward, who disliked long runs, and also needed to set aside time to write and compose, usually insisted on playing a part for no longer than six months: "preferably three months in New York and three months in London") The Broadway premiere was at the National Theatre on 27 November 1936, with mostly the same cast as in London. The New York run, a limited season as in London, ended prematurely because Coward was taken ill. (Note: The play closed for a week at the beginning of March 1937 because Coward was unwell. It was announced that he was suffering from laryngitis, but in fact it was a nervous breakdown, brought on by overwork. The run resumed on 8 March, but after two performances Coward's doctor insisted that he withdraw completely, and the last Broadway performance was given on 9 March.)

== Roles and original cast ==
- Lena (maid) – Moya Nugent
- Victoria (Vicky) Gayforth – Gertrude Lawrence
- Martha Cunningham – Alison Leggatt (Joyce Carey in New York)
- Simon Gayforth – Noël Coward
- Hodge (dresser) – Kenneth Carten
- A Young Man – Anthony Pelissier
- George Cunningham – Alan Webb
- Sibyl Heston – Everley Gregg (Joan Swinstead in New York)
- Michael Doyle – Edward Underdown

== Plot ==
The action of the play begins and ends in the Gayforth's house in Mayfair, London.

It is about midnight when Vicky Gayforth comes into her bedroom with her friend, Martha Cunningham. They have been to the theatre together, but Vicky refuses to accompany Martha to a party because Simon Gayforth, her husband, is sure to be there with Sybil Heston, to whom he is clearly attracted. Vicky intends to go to bed, and takes three strong sleeping tablets. Her admirer Michael Doyle rings up, and she tells him brusquely to call back tomorrow as she is too tired to talk now.

Simon comes to tell Martha that George, her husband, is waiting impatiently for her. Simon too has decided not to go to the party, and he asks the Cunninghams to make his excuses for him. When they have gone he begins a serious conversation with his wife: he asks her to divorce him. She agrees, noting sadly that they have been married for just five years. The sleeping tablets begin to take effect making her head swim. The action becomes shadowy, confused and dreamlike, and is evidently seen through Vicky's drugged eyes. Music is heard; it stops and then starts again. Simon dances a few steps. The music becomes more insistent. Simon and Vicky sing a duet, "Then", about transitory joy. This is followed by a second song, "Play, Orchestra, Play" ("We Must Have Music"). The lights fade to nothing. Sybil Heston appears in a pool of light, telling Simon that they must let Vicky know the truth; they are joined by Michael Doyle, who asks them to give her his love. The lights fade on a reprise of "Play, Orchestra, Play".

The scene changes to a moonlit garden. We see the first meeting of Vicky and Simon, at a country ball. Their dialogue is a mixture of what they said at the time and their current comments on it:

Vicky: What do you do?
Simon: I'm in a bank.
Vicky: High up in a bank? Or just sitting in a cage totting up things?
Simon: Oh, quite high up, really. It's a very good bank.
Vicky: I'm so glad.
Simon: How lovely you are.
Vicky: No, no, that came later – you've skipped some.
Simon: Sorry.
Vicky: You're nice and thin – your eyes are funny – you move easily – I'm afraid you're terribly attractive.
Simon: You never said that.
Vicky: No, but I thought it.
Simon: Stick to the script.

They sing a duet, "You Were There", finishing in each other's arms in a spotlight. The dreamlike mood continues. Lena, the maid, is seen spotlit, carrying sleeping tablets and a glass of water, and singing "Then". In another pool of light, Martha and George are seen in a car discussing the Gayforths' matrimonial troubles: Vicky runs on and accuses them of "spoiling it all". There follow hallucinatory images of the Gayforths' honeymoon journey to Venice and a noisy nightclub where Sybil Heston and Michael Doyle dance together in a brilliant spotlight. Another spotlight picks up Vicky and Simon, and the two couples dance on, constantly switching partners, faster and faster, as voices from the darkness rhythmically chant the names of night-clubs: "The Florida, The Cocoanut Grove, The Four Hundred, The Blue Train". The noise crescendos and then stops suddenly, with a blackout.

Lena, spotlit, is seen telephoning Martha asking her to come back to the house because Vicky is suffering from an overdose of sleeping tablets and Simon is alarmed about her. In the final scene the lighting returns to normal. Simon, Lena and Martha are at Vicky's bedside, giving her black coffee. Simon tells her, when she asks for explanations, that, under the influence of the drug, "you just went mad, that's all – raving … you began dancing about the room". Deciding that Vicky is now safe, the others leave her alone with Simon. When she asks him about the divorce, he declares that he wants nothing of the sort; everything is all right again between them. He lifts her on to the bed, covers her over with the counterpane, and lies down on the sofa at her feet.

== Revivals and adaptations ==
=== Theatre ===
In 1937 a company led by Estelle Winwood and Robert Henderson toured the Tonight at 8.30 cycle in the US and Canada. In their production of Shadow Play Jessie Royce Landis and Bramwell Fletcher played Vicky and Simon Gaythorpe. In 1946 Madge Elliott and Cyril Ritchard played the Gaythorpes in an Australian tour, in a bill also containing Ways and Means and Family Album. Shadow Play was revived on Broadway in 1948, with Lawrence as Vicky and Graham Payn as Simon, directed by Coward as part of a US tour of Tonight at 8.30. The two other plays on the programme with Shadow Play were Hands Across the Sea and Fumed Oak.

In 1971 the Shaw Festival revived Shadow Play, along with We Were Dancing and Family Album. Carole Shelley and Paxton Whitehead played the Gayforths. A 1980 London production at the King's Head Theatre transferred in 1981 to the Lyric Theatre; it starred John Standing and Estelle Kohler. Hands Across the Sea and Red Peppers were the other plays in the programme.

In 2000, the Williamstown Theatre Festival staged six of the plays, including Shadow Play. (Note: The others were: We Were Dancing, Family Album, Hands Across the Sea, Red Peppers and Star Chamber.) Charlotte d'Amboise and Bill Irwin played Vicky and Simon. At the Chichester Festival in 2006 Shadow Play was staged, as were five other plays from the cycle. (Note: Hands Across the Sea, Red Peppers, Family Album, Fumed Oak and The Astonished Heart.) Josefina Gabrielle and Alexander Hanson played the leading roles.

The Antaeus Company in Los Angeles revived all ten plays in October 2007, and in 2009 the Shaw Festival did likewise. In the first professional revival of the cycle in Britain, (Note: Omitting Star Chamber.) given by English Touring Theatre in 2014, Olivia Poulet and Rupert Young played the Gayforths. In London, nine of the ten plays in the cycle were given at the Jermyn Street Theatre in 2018. (Note: The omitted play was Fumed Oak.) In Shadow Play Sara Crowe played Vicky and Ian Hallard was Simon.

=== Radio and television ===
An adaptation for radio was broadcast in the US in 1945, with Helen Hayes and Alfred Drake as Vicky and Simon. In 1954 Otto Preminger directed a Producers' Showcase television production of Shadow Play, featuring Ginger Rogers and Gig Young, along with Still Life and Red Peppers.

In 1991, BBC television mounted productions of the individual plays of Tonight at 8.30 starring Joan Collins. In Shadow Play she co-starred with Simon Williams. A BBC radio production was broadcast in 1999 as part of the celebrations of Coward's centenary. Julia Watson and Steven Pacey played the Gayforths.

== Reception ==
The Observer reported, "A neat production, coupled with one first-rate song, 'You Were There,' whose tune is one of the best in the tender line that Mr Coward has ever given us, carries this fantasy with a dancing motion past the banalities on which it might easily stumble." The Manchester Guardian called the play "warmed with human feeling", though doubting the durability of the couple's reconciliation. The drama critic Kenneth Tynan later remarked that Coward's "Small talk, small talk with other thoughts going on behind" in this play and others were an influence on Harold Pinter.

Coward later wrote of his score for the play: "At the end of the first scene of the play we belted out "Play, Orchestra, Play" in the teeth of the audience while the stage staff was changing the scene behind us. "You Were There" we sang and danced more tranquilly in a moonlit garden. It was reprised by me later in the show while Gertie was scrambling breathlessly into a grey bouffant dress in the quick-change room at the side of the stage. It is a pleasant, sentimental little song and we both enjoyed doing it."

== Notes, references and sources ==
=== Sources ===
- Castle, Charles (1972). Noël. London: W H Allen. ISBN 978-0-491-00534-0.
- Coward, Noël (1979). Plays: Three. London: Eyre Methuen. ISBN 978-0-413-46100-1.
- Fujiwara, Chris (2009). The World and its Double: The Life and Work of Otto Preminger. London: Faber. ISBN 978-0-571-22370-1.
- Hoare, Philip (1995). Noël Coward, A Biography. London: Sinclair-Stevenson. ISBN 978-1-4081-0675-4.
- Morley, Sheridan (1974) [1969]. A Talent to Amuse. London: Penguin. ISBN 978-0-14-003863-7.
- Morley, Sheridan (1999). "Introduction". Coward: Plays 7. London: Bloomsbury. ISBN 978-0-4137-3400-6.
- Morley, Sheridan (2005). Noël Coward. London: Haus Publishing. ISBN 978-1-90-434188-8.
