= Philip Braham =

English composer (1881–1934)

Philip Braham (18 June 1881 – 2 May 1934) was an English composer of the early twentieth century, chiefly associated with theatrical work. From 1914, he composed music for such musicals and revues as Theodore & Co (1916) and London Calling! (1923), including several revues produced by André Charlot. His best-known song is "Limehouse Blues," which has been recorded by many artists. He wrote for film in the 1930s.

== Biography ==
Braham studied at Cambridge University. He began to compose music for the theatre in 1913 with Alice up to Date at the London Pavilion and became musical director of the Comedy Theatre in London. In World War I, Braham volunteered for medical work, being unfit for active service and worked as a casualty dresser at Charing Cross Hospital. He contributed additional music to musicals such as The Girl in the Train (1914), and Theodore & Co and See Saw, both in 1916. He wrote the music for the hit revue Tails Up! (1918), together with his frequent collaborator Douglas Furber, which played at the Comedy Theatre in London for 467 performances.

The best-remembered show on which Braham worked was probably London Calling! (1923) on which he collaborated with Noël Coward. In 1925, he collaborated with Coward in On with the Dance and with John Hastings Turner on Bubbly, starring Cyril Ritchard. He wrote for several revues produced by André Charlot. His best-known song is the jazz standard "Limehouse Blues", which he co-wrote with Douglas Furber. It was introduced by Teddie Gerard in the 1921 West End revue A to Z, but it was soon closely associated with Gertrude Lawrence and was subsequently recorded by several artists and used in films.

In the early 1930s, Braham turned to film music, working as musical director at Wembley Studios and writing music for such films as Money for Speed (1933). He was managing director of Philip Braham and Campbell and was on the board of directors of the London Pavilion. He was known in the theatrical world as "Pa" and was noted for his hospitality. He died suddenly in his office in London, aged 52.
