= Tails Up! =

Tails Up! was a 1918 London revue presented by André Charlot starring Jack Buchanan. The premiere took place at the Comedy Theatre, London on 1 June 1918 with Philip Braham conducting the band, and the show ran for 467 performances.

== Songs ==
The main credit for the music was to Philip Braham with lyrics by Davy Burnaby and Hugh E. Wright. The "Book" (or script) was by John Hastings Turner. Additional songs were provided by Doris Joel, Noël Coward, and others.

Songs in the revue included:

by Philip Braham

- "Wild thyme"
- "The Apache rag"
- "Let's all go raving mad"
- "The twinkle in her eye"
- "The 5.35 to Brighton"
- "Gnee'ah"
- "When the curfew rings"
- "The servants' ball"
- "Tails up!
- "The old bran pie"

by Ivor Novello

- "Anything I can do for you"

by Noël Coward and Doris Joel

- "Peter Pan" This was Coward's first publicly performed song. "Peter Pan" was Coward's first lyric to be sold, though the accounts of Coward's audition with Charlot given by Coward and Charlot differ markedly.

By Al Jolson, B.G. DeSylva and Gus Kahn

- "'N Everything"

== Cast ==
- Jack Buchanan
- Phyllis Monkman
- Phyllis Titmuss
- Gilbert Childs
- Clifford Cobb
- Teddie Gerard

Babette Tobin
