= Limehouse Blues (song) =

Popular British song performed by Louis Armstrong

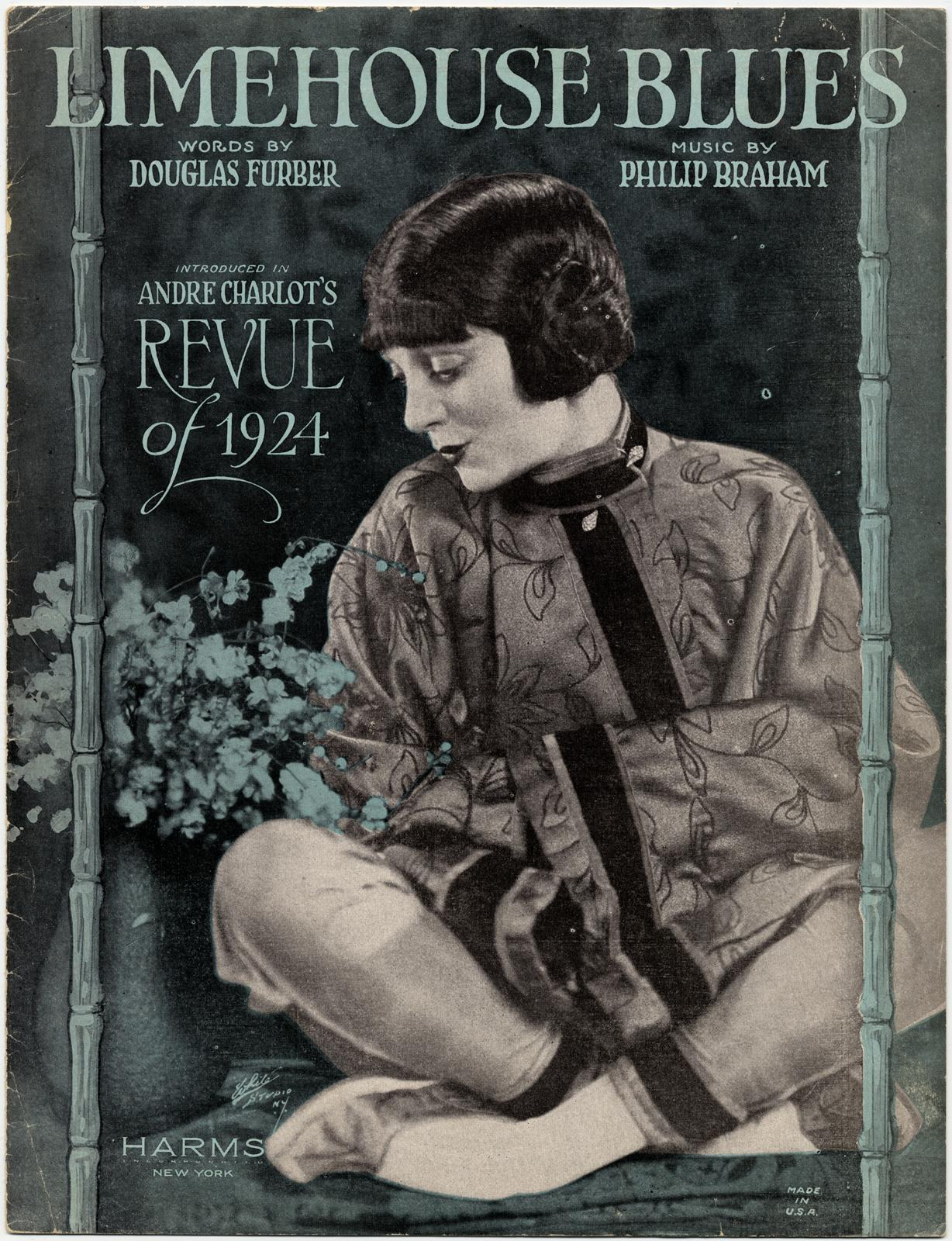
- A 1920s sheet music cover

Song
- Published: 1922 by Harms
- Composer: Philip Braham
- Lyricist: Douglas Furber

Limehouse Blues melody on alto saxophone

"Limehouse Blues" is a popular British song written by the London-based duo of Douglas Furber (lyrics) and Philip Braham (music).

== Composition History ==
Evoking the Limehouse district, which pre-World War II was considered the Chinatown of London – with Chinese references heard in both the lyrics and the melody – the song premiered in the 1921 West End André Charlot revue A to Z being sung by Teddie Gerard in a wordless melodramatic number featuring Gerard as a hostess in a Limehouse dance-hall fronting a brothel. A piano rendition was recorded for Ampico piano rolls by Ferde Grofé in June, 1922, as well as a Recording for the His Master's Voice by the Queen's Dance Orchestra (with a young Jack Hylton on piano). Gertrude Lawrence, recruited to replace an ailing Beatrice Lillie in A to Z, was reassigned the "Limehouse Blues" number which Lawrence encored when she made her 1924 Broadway debut in André Charlot's Revue. Lawrence's Broadway performance of the "Limehouse Blues" number proved to be a "showstopper", making her a Broadway star:(quote Lawrence:) "'Limehouse Blues' immediately became popular. We heard it in every night club in New York [City]. In England we never plugged songs as they do in the United States, and I was surprised and extremely flattered to find everyone singing and playing 'Limehouse....' wherever I went." The 1968 Gertrude Lawrence biopic Star! featured the film's star Julie Andrews – in muted Oriental makeup – recreating Lawrence's role in the "Limehouse Blues" number from André Charlot's Revue, including the vocal performance of the song (with the original's references to "chinkies" omitted).

Recorded by Gertrude Lawrence in 1931, "Limehouse Blues" had earlier been recorded (1928) by cornetist Red Nichols with Scrappy Lambert's vocal and would be recorded in 1934 by the Mills Brothers: these vintage recordings retained the original's "learned from the chinkies" line. It was usually changed to "learned from the Chinese", "learned from the others" or "learned down in Limehouse" in latterday vocal versions, including those by Tony Bennett, Rosemary Clooney, Ella Fitzgerald, Lee Wiley, Eydie Gormé, Tammy Grimes, Johnny Mathis, Carmen McRae, Mark Murphy, Anita O'Day, Annie Ross, Nancy Sinatra, and Kay Starr. Mark Nadler recorded "Limehouse Blues" in tandem with "Limehouse Nights" – an obscure song from the 1934 film Limehouse Blues – for his 2015 album release Runnin' Wild-Songs and Scandals of the Roaring 20's 2015 album release. "Limehouse Blues" has been recorded most often as an instrumental as such becoming a jazz standard, notable examples being recordings by Cannonball Adderley and John Coltrane, Louis Armstrong, Chet Atkins with Les Paul, Count Basie, Sidney Bechet, the Dave Brubeck Quartet featuring Gerry Mulligan, Duke Ellington, Benny Goodman, Stan Kenton on Adventures In Jazz, the Dave McKenna Quartet with Zoot Sims, the Ellis Marsalis Trio, Hugo Montenegro, Django Reinhardt, the Adrian Rollini Trio, the Vince Guaraldi Trio on The Navy Swings, the Village Stompers, and the Teddy Wilson Trio. The song has also become a popular bluegrass instrumental number, most notably by Reno and Smiley.

== In film ==
"Limehouse Blues" is played by Borrah Minevitch and His Harmonica Rascals in the 1936 film One in a Million, as the second part of a medley that starts with the song "One in a Million"; the two songs have similar melodies and nearly identical rhythms.

The song was played by Hoagy Carmichael in the 1944 film To Have and Have Not.

"Limehouse Blues" lent its title to a segment of the 1946 film Ziegfeld Follies which features Fred Astaire and Lucille Bremer, both in Oriental guise: the story of a coolie (Astaire) attempting to obtain a fan to present to a glamorous woman (Bremer) who has caught his fancy, frames a fantasy dance sequence between Astaire and Bremer scored to the tune of "Limehouse Blues". Reportedly it had been Astaire's own ambition to perform a dance number to "Limehouse Blues" since he'd first heard the song in the 1920s. As Vincente Minnelli directed the "Limehouse Blues" segment of Ziegfeld Follies, his daughter singer-actress Liza Minnelli performed the song in her 1999–2000 Broadway show Minnelli on Minnelli: Live at the Palace with the track appearing on the soundtrack album.

In the 1950 film Young Man with a Horn – inspired by the life of Bix Beiderbecke – "Limehouse Blues" is performed by Harry James whose version was included on the soundtrack of the same name). As performed by Jackie Gleason and his orchestra, "Limehouse Blues" is prominently featured in the 1990 film Alice, key scenes of which are set in the Chinatown neighborhood of Lower Manhattan; a rendition of "Limehouse Blues" by Bert Ambrose is also heard in the film. The 1999 film Sweet and Lowdown – which like Alice was written and directed by Woody Allen – premieres a version of "Limehouse Blues" performed by Howard Alden and the Dick Hyman Group: the number is titled "Limehouse Blues/ Mystery Pacific" as the train imitation which opens the Django Reinhardt composition "Mystery Pacific" is played by Alden as a prelude to "Limehouse Blues".
