= Teresa Cabre =

Teresa Cabre may refer to:

- Maria Teresa Cabré (born 1947), Spanish linguist
- Teddie Gerard (née Teresa Cabre, 1890-1942), Argentine film actress and entertainer
