= Maisie Gay =

English actress and singer

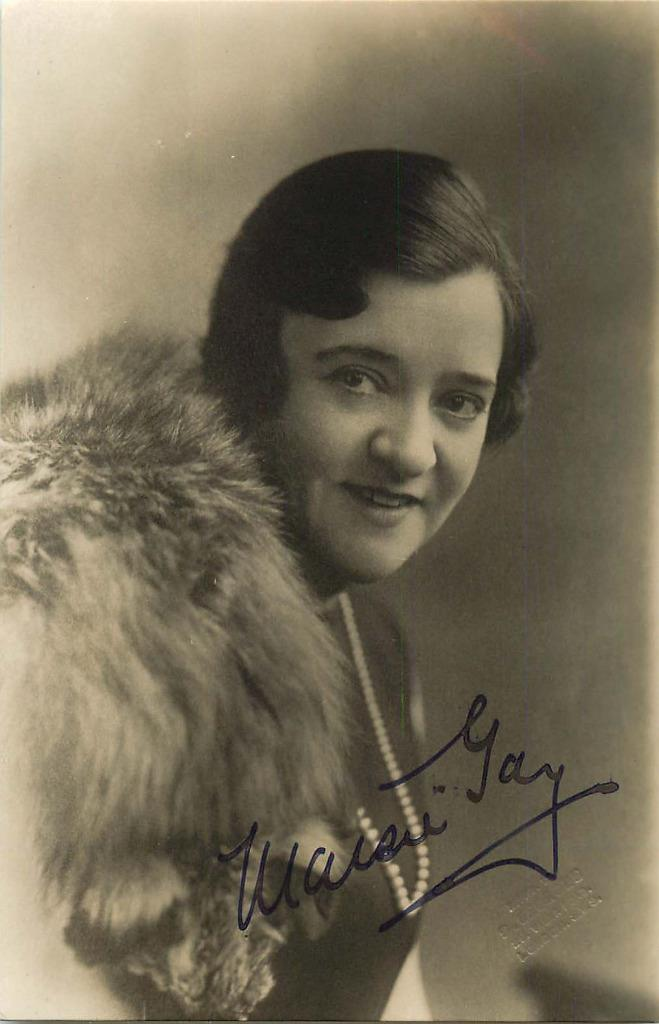
Maisie Gay

Maisie Gay (born Maud Daisy Noble, 7 January 1878 – 13 September 1945), was an English actress and singer known for comic character roles in Edwardian musical comedies, including several by James T. Tanner, and in works by Noël Coward and musical film adaptations of Edgar Wallace plays.

== Early life ==
Gay was born in Willesden, London, daughter of Peter Noble and Charlotte Elizabeth Pratt Noble. She attended the North London Collegiate School for Girls.

== Career ==
Gay first appeared on stage in 1903 as a chorus girl. She soon rose to more prominent roles, and from 1904 to 1907 she toured the British provinces as Nan, the title role in the musical A Country Girl, with a book by James T. Tanner. She made her West End debut in A Waltz King in 1908, and followed that with a role in The Girls of Gottenberg. After a successful run in Tanner's Our Miss Gibbs, Gay toured the United States in another Tanner show, The Quaker Girl. She returned to London to appear in a fourth show with a book by Tanner, The Girl on the Film, in 1913. Gay remained active on the stage in both London and New York, in musicals and revues, during World War I, especially in a US tour of Arthur Hammerstein's High Jinks in 1914 and 1915. She was often in works by Noël Coward, including London Calling! (1923, produced by André Charlot), and This Year of Grace (1928–1929, on tour in Australia).

During her 1915 American tour, she was featured as a celebrity endorsement in newspaper advertisements for Lehman Pianos. In 1925, Sketch magazine called Gay "one of our leading comedians." Her stage persona was described as both "matronly" and "madcap." One comic song by Coward, "There's Life in the Old Girl Yet," became her signature song, and her part in London Calling! as "Miss Hernia Whittlebot" drew ire from Edith Sitwell, who believed the role was a crude parody of herself.

She performed in silent film during visits to the United States, including The Siren's Song (1915). She made her first sound film in 1930, singing in To Oblige a Lady (adapted from the play by Edgar Wallace). She appeared in a second Wallace film adaptation in 1932, The Old Man. Around the same time she wrote her autobiography, Laughing through Life (1931), and retired from the stage as she experienced advancing arthritis.

== Personal life ==
Gay married stage manager Oscar Drewe "Odee" Harris. In retirement they bought a public house called Northey Arms in Box, Wiltshire, and led a mostly quiet retirement there until she died in 1945, aged 67.
