= Fumed Oak =

Play by Noël Coward

l to r: Gertrude Lawrence, Alison Leggatt, Noël Coward and Moya Nugent in the original production

Fumed Oak is a short play in two scenes by Noël Coward, one of ten that make up Tonight at 8.30, a cycle written to be performed across three evenings. Coward billed the work as an "unpleasant comedy in two scenes". The play concerns a downtrodden, middle-aged salesman who, having saved up enough money to cut all ties, walks out on his wife, mother-in-law and "horrible adenoidal daughter", having first told all three what he thinks of them.

In the introduction to a published edition of the plays, Coward wrote, "A short play, having a great advantage over a long one in that it can sustain a mood without technical creaking or over padding, deserves a better fate, and if, by careful writing, acting and producing I can do a little towards reinstating it in its rightful pride, I shall have achieved one of my more sentimental ambitions."

The play was first produced in 1935 in Manchester and on tour and played in London (1936) and New York (1936–1937). It has enjoyed several major revivals and has been adapted for film. At its premières in Manchester and London Fumed Oak was played on the same evening as Hands Across the Sea and Shadow Play. Like all the other plays in the cycle it originally starred Gertrude Lawrence and Coward himself.

Coward later said, "I have always had a reputation for high-life, earned no doubt in the twenties with such plays as The Vortex. But, as you see, I was a suburban boy, born and bred in the suburbs of London, which I've always loved and always will." Fumed Oak, like his later play This Happy Breed, is one of his rare stage depictions of suburban life.

== History ==
Six of the plays in Tonight at 8.30 were first presented at the Opera House, Manchester, beginning on 15 October 1935. Fumed Oak premiered on the third night, 18 October 1935. A seventh play was added on the subsequent provincial tour, and the final three were added for the London run. The first London performance was on 18 January 1936 at the Phoenix Theatre.

Coward directed all ten pieces, and each starred Coward and Gertrude Lawrence. Coward said that he wrote them as "acting, singing, and dancing vehicles for Gertrude Lawrence and myself". The plays were performed in various combinations of three at each performance during the original run. The plays chosen for each performance were announced in advance, although a myth evolved that the groupings were random. Matinées were sometimes billed as Today at 2:30. The title of the play refers to a wood finishing process that treats the oak with ammonia fumes to darken it and emphasise its rough grain; the finish is dull rather than glossy.

The Observer commented in its review, "Mr Coward, as a pale and hairy specimen of suburban revolt throws his supper to the floor and behaves more like Petruchio and looks more like an advertisement for liver pills ... than one could possibly imagine ... he is considerably assisted by Miss Gertrude Lawrence and Miss Alison Leggatt as dowdy shrew and shrew's mama. Miss Moya Nugent, as the dreadful daughter, bravely mutilates her appearance in order to look every inch the adenoid."

The Broadway openings for the three parts took place on 24 November 1936, 27 November 1936 (including Fumed Oak) and 30 November 1936 at the National Theatre, again starring Coward and Lawrence. Star Chamber was not included. The London and New York runs were limited only by Coward's boredom at long engagements.

Major productions of parts of the cycle were revived in 1948 and 1967 on Broadway (including Fumed Oak in 1948 but not in 1967), in 1981 at the Lyric Theatre in London (omitting Fumed Oak) and at the Chichester Festival in 2006 (Shadow Play, Hands Across the Sea, Red Peppers, Family Album, Fumed Oak and The Astonished Heart). In 1971, the Shaw Festival revived three of the plays, and in 2000, the Williamstown Theatre Festival revived six of the plays, but neither revival included Fumed Oak. However, the Antaeus Company in Los Angeles revived all ten plays in October 2007, and the Shaw Festival did so in 2009.

For a 1952 film Meet Me Tonight, directed by Anthony Pelissier, Coward adapted Ways and Means, Red Peppers and Fumed Oak (called Tonight at 8:30 in the US) In 1991, BBC television mounted productions of the individual plays with Joan Collins taking the Lawrence roles. The sheer expense involved in mounting what are effectively ten different productions has usually deterred revivals of the entire Tonight at 8.30 cycle, but the constituent plays can often be seen individually or in sets of three.

== Roles and original cast ==
- Henry Gow – Noël Coward
- Doris (his wife) – Gertrude Lawrence
- Elsie (his daughter) – Moya Nugent
- Mrs Rockett (his mother-in-law) – Alison Leggatt (Joyce Carey in New York)

== Plot ==
It is breakfast time in the home of Henry Gow, a downtrodden, middle-aged salesman. He eats silently while the three women in his life exchange unpleasantries. His sloppy wife, Doris, and "horrible adenoidal daughter", Elsie, argue about her putting her hair up. Doris and his nagging mother-in-law, Mrs Rockett, quarrel about physical complaints, and Doris suggests that her mother move in with another relative. Elsie leaves for school, and her grandmother gives her money despite her mother's objections. Henry leaves the room, and the two women interrupt their argument to focus on him. They prepare to attack Henry, but when he reenters, dressed for work, they become sidetracked, and he departs, as the two continue quarrelling.

Later, at 7.30 that evening, Henry comes home (after a few drinks at a pub) unusually voluble. The women are leaving for the cinema, but Doris henpecks Henry on her way out. He demands that they sit, exclaiming, "What right have you got to nag at me and boss me? No right at all. I'm the one that pays the rent and works for you and keeps you. What do you give me in return, I'd like to know! Nothing! I sit through breakfast while you and mother wrangle. You're too busy being snarly and bad-tempered even to say good morning. I come home tired after working all day and ten to one there isn't even a hot dinner for me." He explains that he has been putting money aside, and he is leaving. He has transferred the freehold of the house to Doris and recommends that she make money by taking in lodgers ("though God help the poor bastards if you do"). With a final critique of each of the three women, he leaves them for good (taking his savings with him), saying: "Good-bye one and all! Nice to have known you." He happily slams the door behind him as they wail.
