= Star! (film) =

1968 film by Robert Wise

- Poster by Howard Terpning
- Directed by: Robert Wise
- Written by: William Fairchild
- Produced by: Saul Chaplin
- Starring: Julie Andrews; Richard Crenna; Michael Craig; Daniel Massey
- Cinematography: Ernest Laszlo
- Edited by: William H. Reynolds
- Music by: Lennie Hayton
- Color process: DeLuxe Color
- Distributed by: 20th Century Fox
- Release dates: July 18, 1968 (United Kingdom, premiere); October 22, 1968 (United States)
- Running time: 175 minutes
- Country: United States
- Language: English
- Budget: $14.32 million
- Box office: $4 million (US); $10 million (worldwide); $4.2 million (rentals)

Star! (re-titled Those Were the Happy Times for its 1969 re-release) is a 1968 American biographical musical film directed by Robert Wise and starring Julie Andrews. The screenplay by William Fairchild is based on the life and career of British performer Gertrude Lawrence.

== Plot ==
In 1940, Gertrude "Gertie" Lawrence is in a screening room watching a documentary film chronicling her life, then flashes back to Clapham in 1915, when she leaves home to join her vaudevillian father in a dilapidated Brixton music hall. Eventually, she joins the chorus in André Charlot's West End revue. She reunites with close childhood friend Noël Coward.

Charlot becomes annoyed with Gertie's efforts to stand out, literally, from the chorus. He threatens to fire her, but stage manager Jack Roper intercedes and gets her hired as a general understudy to the leads. She marries Jack, but it becomes clear she is more inclined to perform onstage than stay home and play wife. While pregnant, she insists on going on for an absent star, and captivates the audience with her own star-making performance of "Burlington Bertie". Charlot and Roper witness the audience's warm approval, and both realize, Charlot grudgingly and Roper wistfully, that Gertie belongs on the stage.

After their daughter Pamela is born, Gertrude is angered when Roper takes the baby on a pub crawl, and leaves him. A subsequent courtship with Sir Anthony Spencer, an English nobleman, polishes Gertie's rough edges and transforms her into a lady. Caught at a chic supper club when she is supposed to be on a sick day, she is fired from the Charlot Revue. Squired by Spencer, she becomes a 'society darling'. Coward then convinces Charlot to feature her in his new production, and she is finally recognized as a star. When the revue opens in New York City, she dallies with an actor and a banker, bringing the number of her suitors to three.

Gertrude faces financial ruin after spending all her considerable earnings, but ultimately manages to pay back her creditors and retain her glamour. As her career soars, her long-distance relationship with her daughter deteriorates. When Pamela cancels an anticipated holiday with Gertie, she gets extremely drunk and insults a roomful of people at a surprise birthday party thrown by Coward. Among the people insulted at the party is American theatre producer Richard Aldrich. When he returns to escort the hungover star home, he gives an honest appraisal of her. She is insulted, then intrigued by him, making an unannounced visit to his Cape Playhouse where she proposes to play the lead. They argue at rehearsal. He proposes marriage; she throws him out.

Back on Broadway, she has trouble getting a handle on a crucial "The Saga of Jenny" number in Lady in the Dark. Aldrich turns up at a daunting rehearsal where he observes her frustration and takes her, with Coward, out to a nightclub. She protests, then realizes the kind of performance they are watching is the key to her dilemma in the show. Coward pronounces him "a very clever man". Gertie later gives a rousing performance of "Jenny". She marries Aldrich eight years before her triumph in The King and I and untimely death from liver cancer at the age of 54.

== Cast ==
- Julie Andrews as Gertrude Lawrence
- Richard Crenna as Richard Aldrich
- Michael Craig as Sir Anthony Spencer
- Daniel Massey as Noël Coward
- Robert Reed as Charles Fraser
- Bruce Forsyth as Arthur Lawrence
- Beryl Reid as Rose
- John Collin as Jack Roper
- Alan Oppenheimer as André Charlot
- Richard Karlan as David Holtzmann, Gertrude's attorney
- Lynley Laurence as Billie Carleton
- Garrett Lewis as Jack Buchanan
- Anthony Eisley as Ben Mitchell
- Jock Livingston as Alexander Woollcott
- J. Pat O'Malley as Dan
- Harvey Jason as Bert
- Matilda Calnan as Dorothy
- Peter Church as Narrator (voice only)
- Jenny Agutter as Pamela Roper (uncredited)
- Don Crichton as 'Limehouse Blues' dance partner (uncredited)
- Bernard Fox as Assistant to Lord Chamberlain (uncredited)
- Paul Harris as Soldier (uncredited)
- Anna Lee as Hostess (uncredited)
- Tony Lo Bianco as New York reporter (uncredited)
- Damian London as Jerry Paul (uncredited)
- Lester Matthews as Lord Chamberlain (uncredited)
- Pamela Kosh as Guest on Bus (uncredited)
- Marie Baker as Orphan (uncredited)
- Gary Warren V/O as young Noel Coward (uncredited)

== Musical numbers ==
1. Overture (Medley: Star!/Someone to Watch Over Me/Jenny/Dear Little Boy/Limehouse Blues)
2. Star!
3. Piccadilly
4. Oh, it's a Lovely War
5. In My Garden of Joy
6. Forbidden Fruit (not on LP, added to end of CD)
7. N' Everything
8. Burlington Bertie from Bow
9. Parisian Pierrot
10. Limehouse Blues
11. Someone to Watch Over Me
12. Dear Little Boy (Dear Little Girl)
13. Entr'acte – Star! instrumental (not on LP soundtrack or CD)
14. Someday I'll Find You
15. The Physician
16. Do, Do, Do
17. Has Anybody Seen our Ship?
18. My Ship
19. The Saga of Jenny
20. Main Title – Star! instrumental (not on LP soundtrack or CD)
- Star! – Extended Version – (originally released as a 45 rpm single; added to the end of the CD; used with director/producer's approval to underscore cast of characters roll for the VHS/Laserdisc release)

== Production ==
According to extensive production details provided in the DVD release of the film, when Julie Andrews signed on to star in The Sound of Music, her contract with 20th Century-Fox was a two-picture deal. As The Sound of Music neared completion, director Robert Wise and producer Saul Chaplin had grown so fond of her that they wanted to make sure that their team would be the one to pick up the studio's option for the other picture "before anybody else got to her first".

Wise's story editor Max Lamb suggested a biopic of Lawrence and, although Andrews previously had rejected offers to portray the entertainer, she was as keen to work with Wise and Chaplin again as they were to work with her, and she subsequently warmed to their approach to the story. She signed for $1 million against 10 percent of the gross plus 35 cents for each soundtrack album sold.

== Theatrical release ==
The film had its world premiere on July 18, 1968, at the Dominion Theatre in London, replacing The Sound of Music, which had played for three years at the theatre.

At a time when the popularity of roadshow theatrical releases in general, and musicals in particular, was on the wane, the United States was one of the later countries in which the film was released. When the film was in production, 15,000 people responded to promotional ads placed by 20th Century Fox for advance ticket sales in New York City, but a year later, when the studio followed up by mailing them order forms, only a very small percentage bought tickets. Sales were higher for Wednesday matinees than for Saturday nights, indicating that a crucial component—young adults—would not be a large part of the picture's audience. The film opened in the U.S. with little advance sale and good-to-mediocre reviews.

Star! was a commercial disappointment in its initial run, suffering about 20 minutes of studio-requested and director-approved cuts while still in its roadshow engagements. By September 1970 Fox estimated the film had lost the studio $15,091,000.

== Critical reception ==
Renata Adler of The New York Times observed "A lot of the sets are lovely, Daniel Massey acts beautifully as a kind of warmed Nöel Coward, and the film, which gets richer and better as it goes along, has a nice scene from Private Lives. People who like old-style musicals should get their money's worth. So should people who like Julie Andrews. But people who liked Gertrude Lawrence had better stick with their record collections and memories."

Variety wrote "Julie Andrews' portrayal...occasionally sags between musical numbers but the cast and team of redoubtable technical contributors have helped to turn out a pleasing tribute to one of the theatre's most admired stars. It gives a fascinating coverage of Lawrence's spectacular rise to showbiz fame, and also a neatly observed background of an epoch now gone."

Time Out London wrote "Wise's biopic hardly deserved the rough treatment it received from most critics and audiences, who had been led by the studio's advertising to expect another Sound of Music. This was a far more ambitious project; it backfired, but it backfired with a certain amount of honour. Daniel Massey's mincing portrayal of his godfather Noël Coward wins hands down over all the other impersonations."

TV Guide thought "it deserved a better fate for its enormous score, top-flight production, excellent choreography, and fine acting".

Kevin Thomas of the Los Angeles Times described the film as "stylish, sharp-edged, and underrated".

== Awards and nominations ==
Award	Category	Nominee(s)	Result	Ref.
Academy Awards	Best Supporting Actor	Daniel Massey	Nominated	
Academy Awards	Best Art Direction	Art Direction: Boris Leven; Set Decoration: Walter M. Scott and Howard Bristol	Nominated	
Academy Awards	Best Cinematography	Ernest Laszlo	Nominated	
Academy Awards	Best Costume Design	Donald Brooks	Nominated	
Academy Awards	Best Score of a Musical Picture – Original or Adaptation	Lennie Hayton	Nominated	
Academy Awards	Best Song – Original for the Picture	"Star!"; Music by Jimmy Van Heusen; Lyrics by Sammy Cahn	Nominated	
Academy Awards	Best Sound	Twentieth Century-Fox Studio Sound Department	Nominated	
Golden Globe Awards	Best Actress in a Motion Picture – Musical or Comedy	Julie Andrews	Nominated	
Golden Globe Awards	Best Supporting Actor – Motion Picture	Daniel Massey	Won	
Golden Globe Awards	Best Original Song – Motion Picture	"Star!"; Music by Jimmy Van Heusen; Lyrics by Sammy Cahn	Nominated	
Golden Globe Awards	Most Promising Newcomer – Male	Daniel Massey	Nominated	
Writers Guild of America Awards	Best Written American Musical	William Fairchild	Nominated	

== See also ==
- List of American films of 1968
