= Bessie Jones (Welsh singer) =

Welsh opera singer (1887–1974)

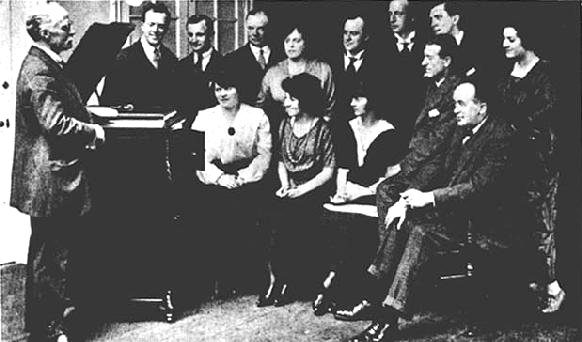
Bessie Jones (seated at left) at a recording session for The Pirates of Penzance in 1920

Bessie Jones (1887 – November 1974) was a Welsh singer featured on some of the earliest recordings of songs from London musicals. Jones began a professional opera career soon after training at the Royal College of Music. From 1913 to 1926, she was a contract singer at Gramophone Company/His Master's Voice, recording numerous popular songs, Welsh folksongs and musical theatre songs, and appearing on recordings of the Gilbert and Sullivan operas and several other works. She also had an oratorio and concert career and sang in BBC radio broadcasts.

== Early life and career ==
Jones was raised in Tonypandy the daughter of John Jones, a fruiterer. Jones studied at the Royal College of Music, where she won the operatic class prize in 1910 and the Henry Leslie prize for singers in 1912. In the college's 1911 production of Cherubini's opera The Water Carrier, Jones starred alongside George Baker under the direction of Richard Temple and Sir Charles Stanford. She sang at the Proms in 1913 conducted by Sir Henry Wood, and played Wellgunde and the Woodbird in Wagner's Ring cycle at the Royal Opera House with conductor Arthur Nikisch in 1914. The Manchester Guardian called her, "a new soprano with a sweet voice of considerable power".

== His Master's Voice and later years ==
"Climbing over rocky mountain"
From The Pirates of Penzance, recorded 1920, with Jones singing the role of Edith

1918 advertisement for The Mikado featuring Jones

Jones was a contract singer for Gramophone Company studios from 1913 to 1926 recording popular numbers as well as Welsh folksongs in the original Welsh. Among her notable recordings was the original 1918 recording of the song "Peter Pan", Noël Coward's first lyric for the London stage, from the revue Tails Up!. This was Coward's first publicly performed song. She was one of the His Master's Voice contract singers to use the pseudonym "Madame Deering".

When His Master's Voice earliest recordings of the Gilbert and Sullivan operas were made between 1918 and 1924 under the direction of Rupert D'Oyly Carte, Jones sang the roles of Peep-Bo in The Mikado (1918), Gianetta and Fiametta in The Gondoliers (1919), Kate in The Yeomen of the Guard (1920), Edith in The Pirates of Penzance (1921), Lady Saphir in Patience (1922), Celia in Iolanthe (1923) and Josephine in H.M.S. Pinafore (1924). Also for His Master's Voice, Jones recorded Edward German's Merrie England under the direction of the composer in 1918, and Puccini's Madame Butterfly in 1924, in which she sang Kate Pinkerton. For the same company Jones recorded less serious repertoire, including the songs "Down Zummerzet way" (by T C Sterndale Bennett), "The interfering parrot" (from The Geisha), "Up there!" (by Ivor Novello), "Daddy's sweetheart" (by Liza Lehmann), and "The Mirror Song" (by Oscar Straus).

In the concert hall, Jones's repertoire included Berlioz' La damnation de Faust and Bach's St Matthew Passion. She was a pioneer broadcaster, singing on BBC radio when the organisation was still a limited company. In one performance from 1938 on a BBC radio programme in Wales, she was accompanied on the piano by her husband Edgar Jones.

== Notes ==
=== References ===
- Rollins, Cyril; Witts, R. John (1962). The D'Oyly Carte Opera Company in Gilbert and Sullivan Operas: A Record of Productions, 1875–1961. London: Michael Joseph. OCLC 504581419.
- Rust, Brian, ed. (1975). Gramophone Records of the First World War – An His Master's Voice Catalogue 1914–18. Newton Abbot: David and Charles. ISBN 0-7153-6842-7.
