= The Cave Girl (film) =

1921 film by Joseph J. Franz

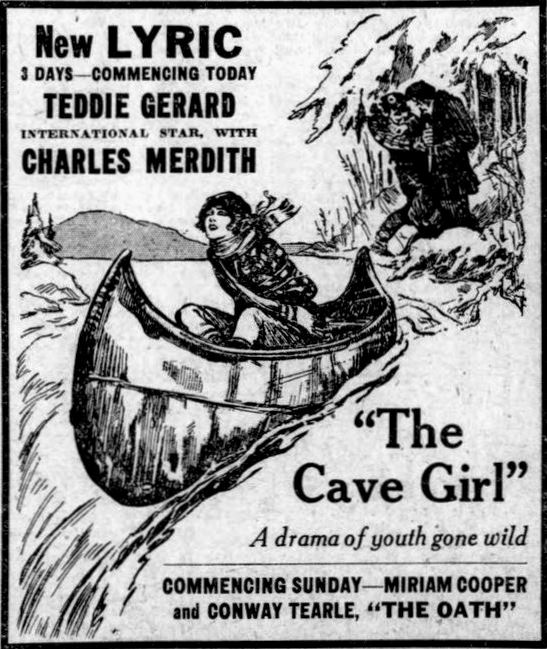
- Newspaper ad
- Directed by: Joseph J. Franz
- Screenplay by: William Parker; Katherine Hilliker (titles)
- Based on: The Cave Girl (1920) (play) by Guy Bolton and George Middleton
- Produced by: Jesse D. Hampton
- Starring: Teddie Gerard; Charles Meredith; Boris Karloff
- Cinematography: Victor Milner
- Production companies: Jesse D. Hampton Productions; Inspiration Pictures, Inc.
- Distributed by: Associated First National
- Release date: December 26, 1921
- Running time: 49 minutes
- Country: United States
- Language: Silent (English intertitles)

The Cave Girl is a 1921 American silent drama film directed by Joseph J. Franz and featuring Teddie Gerard, Charles Meredith, Lillian Tucker and Boris Karloff in an early film role. The source for the William Parker screenplay was the stage play of the same name by George Middleton and Guy Bolton. The film's tagline was "A Romance of Silent Trails and Rushing Waters... A Drama of Youth Gone Wild... Enacted in the Yosemite Valley in the Middle of Winter." The film is presumed lost.

== Plot ==
Professor Sperry moves to a cave in the wilderness to live the primitive life, taking his daughter Margot with him.

Meanwhile, Divvy Bates is being pressured to marry Elsie Case. Elsie's mother and Divvy's wealthy father arrange a trip to the Bates' remote cabin in the wilderness to give Elsie a chance to extract a marriage proposal from Divvy. At the cabin, Divvy catches Margot making a raid on the Bates' supplies and is attracted to her. Elsie now has to compete with Margot for Divvy's affections.

When their hired hand Baptiste (Boris Karloff) is fired, he retaliates by burning down their cabin. The party is forced to seek refuge in the cave along with the Professor and Margot. Seeing her chance to marry Divvy slipping away, Elsie conspires with Baptiste to kidnap Margot who ends up being set adrift in a canoe. Elsie's conscience suffers and she realizes that she has done wrong. Elsie confesses to Divvy, who then rescues Margot from the rapids in the nick of time.

== Cast ==
- Charles Meredith as Divvy Bates
- Lillian Tucker as Elsie Case
- Jacob Abrams as Prof. Orlando Sperry (credited as Jake Abrahams)
- Teddie Gerard as Margot
- Boris Karloff as Baptiste, a villainous half-breed
- Elinor Hancock as Mrs. Georgia Case (credited as Eleanor Hancock)
- Frank J. Coleman as Rufus Petterson
- Wilton Taylor as J.T. Bates
- John Beck as Rogers

== Production ==
Cave Girl was made by Jesse D. Hampton Productions and completed in February 1921. Exteriors were filmed in Yosemite Valley in the winter of 1920–21. Inspiration Pictures acquired the film from Hampton Productions in May, 1921, and released it in December.

== Release ==
Charles Duell, the head of Inspiration Pictures, arranged to screen the picture for the first time at the governor's mansion in New York, June 1921. The governor had recently spearheaded legislation that resulted in the formation of New York's Motion Picture Commission, a committee tasked with the censorship of films.

In February 1922, Film Daily gave it a positive review due primarily to the photography and the exteriors: "For winter scenery and fine out-of-doors atmosphere The Cave Girl belongs way up in the front rank and even if the story isn't a whopper, the feature as a whole will be likely to satisfy because of its splendid pictorial appeal."
