= To Oblige a Lady =

1931 film

- Theatrical release poster
- Directed by: H. Manning Haynes
- Based on: To Oblige a Lady by Edgar Wallace
- Produced by: S.W. Smith
- Starring: Maisie Gay; Warwick Ward; Lilian Oldland; Haddon Mason
- Production company: British Lion Film Corporation
- Distributed by: British Lion Film Corporation
- Release date: 16 February 1931
- Running time: 70 minutes
- Country: United Kingdom
- Language: English

To Oblige a Lady is a 1931 British comedy film directed by H. Manning Haynes and starring Maisie Gay, Warwick Ward, Lilian Oldland, Haddon Mason and James Carew. It was based on a play by Edgar Wallace and produced at Beaconsfield Studios as a quota quickie for release as a second feature.

== Plot ==
A couple rent a luxury flat and try to pass it off as their own in order to impress a wealthy relative.

== Cast ==
- Maisie Gay as Mrs Harris
- Warwick Ward as George Pinder
- Lilian Oldland as Betty Pinder
- Haddon Mason as John Pendergast
- James Carew as Sir Henry Markham
- Annie Esmond as Mrs Higgins

== Reception ==
Kine Weekly wrote: "Adapted from an original story by Edgar Wallace, this farce has rather obvious humour, and scores chiefly by Maisie Gay's low comedy characterisation. It contains a song written by Noel Coward, which is the funniest thing in the show. ... Maisie Gay gives an excellent characterisation in spite of the not too original nature of the dialogue. Warwick Ward, as George, and Haddon Mason, as John, do what they can with not very 'fat' parts. ... The plot is a slight one, and the whole entertainment relies on Maisie Gay's efforts. Reproduction is straightforward, and attempts nothing in the way of pictorial scope."

The Daily Film Renter wrote: "Popular farce material, with Maisie Gay in a Mrs. 'Arris part, which gives her plenty of typical opportunities; deft direction by Manning Haynes, of the original story, shows an expert knowledge of public taste. Plenty of laughs, several original story twists, and a very funny finish. Good popular booking."
