= Dimming the lights on Broadway =

At Broadway theatres in New York City, deaths of major figures in the world of theatre are often acknowledged by dimming the lights on the marquees. It is a coordinated tribute which usually lasts for one minute, shortly before the start of the evening performances.

The first documented occurrence was in 1952, after the death of actress Gertrude Lawrence, though the house lights inside the theater were dimmed. The practice was initially very rare and was repeated only twice in the following quarter-century: for Oscar Hammerstein II in 1960 (involving the dimming of marquee lights, which became the standard practice) and Alfred Lunt in 1977. However, by the 21st century, it became a relatively common form of tribute, occurring multiple times a year.

The Broadway League's Committee of Theatre Owners decide who will receive the tribute. While most honorees directly worked in theatre, others who have had the lights dimmed for them have included journalists, talent agents, and businesspeople whose work was variously involved with Broadway. Some decisions have proven controversial; choices not to dim the lights for certain figures, or to only dim the lights at select theaters, have caused backlash which occasionally lead the committee to revise its decisions. Actors' Equity has publicly opposed tributes which involve only some theatres, and in 2024, following a series of controversies over "partial" dimming tributes, the Committee of Theatre Owners said they would review their policies regarding the matter.
