= 'N Everything =

Song
- Published: 1917
- Composer(s): Gus Kahn; B.G. "Buddy" DeSylva

"'N Everything" is an Al Jolson song by songwriters B.G. "Buddy" DeSylva and Gus Kahn. Jolson adapted the song with improvisation as performances of Sinbad progressed, leading Jolson to eventually be given co-lyricist credit on the song. The success of "'N Everything" prompted Jolson to ask DeSylva for further songs. And DeSylva complied with his request to write some songs, including "I'll Say She Does", again with Kahn and Jolson listed as his collaborators.

== History ==
Jolson recorded "'N Everything" in 1917 and then interpolated the song into Sinbad at New York's Winter Garden Theatre in 1918.
