= London Calling! (musical) =

British musical written by Noël Coward

- Music: Noël Coward, Philip Braham, Noble Sissle, Eubie Blake
- Lyrics: Noël Coward
- Book: Noël Coward, Ronald Jeans
- Productions: 1923 West End, London

London Calling! was a musical revue, produced by André Charlot with music and lyrics by Noël Coward, which opened at the Duke of York's Theatre, London on 4 September 1923. It was Noël Coward's first publicly produced musical work. The song "Parisian Pierrot", sung by Gertrude Lawrence, was his first big hit and became one of his signature tunes.

== Background ==
The basis of London Calling! began at the Swiss resort of Davos in Christmas 1922, when Coward joined his close friend and benefactor Lord Lathom. In the words of Coward's biographer Cole Lesley:

Noël, almost exploding with new songs and ideas for sketches and yet more songs, played and sang and expounded his ideas until Ned Lathom decided there was nearly enough for a revue and that he must send for André Charlot, whose last show, A to Z, he had financed.

After Charlot arrived Coward worked from the early mornings and presented his work to Lathom and Charlot in the afternoon. He recalled in his memoirs that "a series of cigar-laden conferences" decided the whole plan of the show, and provisionally cast Coward, Gertrude Lawrence and Maisie Gay in the star roles. Coward, realising the magnitude of his task, agreed that Charlot could call in another writer if necessary. Ronald Jeans was later brought in to co-write the book and Philip Braham, the musical director of the show, contributed to the musical numbers.

Noël Coward and Gertrude Lawrence in London Calling!

Sending up the Sitwells: "The Swiss Family Whittlebot", with l to r Tubby Edlin, Leonard Childs, Maisie Gay and William Childs

In London, plans advanced for staging the revue, but were disrupted when Coward realised that Charlot intended to pay him considerably less than his co-stars. He declined to appear on those terms; Charlot could not replace him because Coward had a contractual right of veto in casting and turned down all other suggestions for the leading man. Charlot gave way, and paid him a weekly wage of £40 (equivalent to £2,091 in 2025) like his co-stars. Coward was out of practice as a dancer and obtained the help of Fred Astaire, who was appearing at the Shaftesbury Theatre in the West End with his sister Adele. Astaire coached him privately "with unending patience and not too frightful results". Astaire subsequently choreographed two numbers for the show – a duet for Lawrence and Coward –"You Were Meant for Me" (words and music by Noble Sissle and Eubie Blake) and a solo dance for Coward in "Sentiment" (words by Coward, music by Braham).

The revue sketches made light of London society at the time, with one sketch called "The Swiss Family Whittlebot" poking fun at the Sitwells, known for their avant-garde poetry and ideas. (Note: Coward had stalked out ostentatiously during the public premiere of Edith Sitwell and William Walton's combination of poetry and music, Façade, three months earlier, repelled by its modernism. His parody of the Sitwells caused a feud between him and them that lasted for four decades until they made their peace in the early 1960s and Coward became a friend of Edith Sitwell in particular.) Charlot secured an exclusive licence for use of Laurens Hammond's patented 3-D "Shadowgraph" process which was employed later in the run. The Times reported, "By means of this, the members of the audience, if they wear the specially coloured glasses provided for them, gain the impression that those on the stage are very much nearer than they actually are".

"London calling" was the call sign of 2LO radio – forerunner of the BBC – inaugurated in May 1922. Charlot was a strong opponent of broadcasting, which he saw as a rival, and The Evening Standard called him "cold and calculating" for giving his new revue its title "so that the wireless people will be compelled to give him a free advertisement every time they broadcast".

== Productions ==
The revue, directed by Herbert Mason, opened at the Duke of York's Theatre on 4 September 1923 and ran for 316 performances. It was twice revised during its run. Soon after it opened, Charlot agreed with the American producer Archie Selwyn to present a revue on Broadway compiled from the best numbers and sketches from Charlot shows of recent years and starring Beatrice Lillie, Jack Buchanan and – to Coward's great regret – Lawrence, who had to leave the London show to sail to New York in December.

Dorothy Clarke and Joyce Barbour replaced Lawrence and Eileen Molyneux for the second edition, starting on 1 December 1923. Coward provided two new numbers: "Temperamental Honeymoon" (for himself) and "I Prefer to be on the Safe Side" (for Barbour). For the third edition only Maisie Gay remained of the original stars. The new cast included Teddie Gerard, A. W. Baskomb and Lance Lister. Coward wrote two more new numbers: "When we were Girls" (for Gay and Baskomb) and "A Spanish Grandee" (for Gerard).

== Songs ==
=== Original run ===
- "Tamarisk Town" (Coward) – Gertrude Lawrence
- "Other Girls" (Coward) – Noël Coward and chorus
- "When My Ship Comes Home" (Coward) – Winifred Satchell
- "Carrie" (Coward) – Lawrence
- "There's Life in the Old Girl Yet" (Coward) – Maisie Gay and chorus
- "Russian Blues" (Coward) – Coward, Eileen Molyneux, Childs Brothers, Dolores Sisters, Betty Nicholas and chorus
- "Prenez Garde, Lisette" (Coward) – Gay
- "You Were Meant For Me" (Sissle and Blake) – Lawrence and Coward
- "Sentiment" (Philip Braham and Coward) –Coward
- "Parisian Pierrot" (Coward) –Lawrence
- "What Love Means to Girls Like Me" (Coward) – Gay
- "Follow a Star" (Coward) – Lawrence and company

"The Old Lady Shows Her Muddles": Maisie Gay and Tubby Edlin

=== Additions ===
==== Second edition, 1 December 1923 ====
- "Temperamental Honeymoon" (Coward) – Coward and chorus
- "I Prefer to be on the Safe Side" – Joyce Barbour

==== Third edition, 26 February 1924 ====
- "When We Were Girls Together" (Coward) – Maisie Gay and chorus
- "A Spanish Grandee" (Coward) – Teddie Gerard and chorus

== Reception ==
Reviews were highly favourable. The Times commented:

Those cynics who aver that the modern revue is only a conglomeration of ill-assorted music-hall turns should pay a visit to the Duke of York's Theatre to see Mr Chariot's new production, London Calling! ... The production has more real humour – and more subtle humour – in it than many much more pretentious productions, and some of the spectacles are beautiful in the extreme. ... It is impossible to single out all the items which deserve praise, but of the sketches "The Old Lady Shows Her Muddles" introduces us to a very amusing Mrs. Malaprop, who perpetrates all her malapropisms in trying to humour her son by using modern slang, "Early Mourning", practically a monologue giving Miss Gertrude Lawrence an opportunity of distinguishing herself, and "Love's Labour". "The Swiss Family Whittlebot is a broad and amusing satire on very modern poetry".

The critic in The Eastern Post wrote:

This splendid revue, which is doing big business at the Duke of York's Theatre, is deserving of success, for Andre Charlot, the producer, always secures good artistes, and in this particular one he was fortunate enough to get Ronald Jeans and Noel Coward to write it, and additional numbers were introduced by Philip Braham and Sissle and Blake. Miss Gertrude Lawrence had a great deal to do, and did it all very well too: she is a clever girl and always gets it across. Miss Maisie Gay was well supplied with good material, too, and was very droll and amusing. Noel Coward himself was well to the fore all through the performance, and had some capital songs and dances. Tubby Edlin was quite at his best. ... London Calling is quite as good as any revue we have had for many a long day, and should fill the theatre all through the winter months.

== Notes, references and sources ==
=== Sources ===
- Coward, Noël (2004) [1932]. Present Indicative – Autobiography to 1931. London: Methuen. ISBN 978-0-413-77413-2.
- Day, Barry, ed. (2007). The Letters of Noël Coward. London: Methuen. ISBN 978-1-4081-0675-4.
- Hennessy, Brian (2005). The Emergence of Broadcasting in Britain. Lympstone: Southerleigh. ISBN 978-0-95-514080-8.
- Hoare, Philip (1995). Noël Coward, A Biography. London: Sinclair-Stevenson. ISBN 978-1-4081-0675-4.
- Morley, Sheridan (2005). Coward. London: Haus. ISBN 978-1-90-434188-8.
- Lesley, Cole (1976). The Life of Noël Coward. London: Cape. ISBN 978-0-224-01288-1.
- Mander, Raymond; Mitchenson, Joe; Day, Barry; Morley, Sheridan (2000) [1957]. Theatrical Companion to Coward (second ed.). London: Oberon. ISBN 978-1-84002-054-0.
