= Charles Castle =

British dancer and biographer (1939–2013)

Charles Castle (26 May 1939 – 5 October 2013) was a South African-born tap dancer, writer and television producer.

Castle produced two documentaries, This Was Richard Tauber for Omnibus on BBC One and This Was Noël Coward, which won the International Critics' Award at the Monte-Carlo Television Festival. He wrote about Folies Bergère and celebrities, including Noël Coward, Joan Crawford, Oliver Messel, and Margaret, Duchess of Argyll.

Castle died at Montcabirol, a hamlet dedicated to the development of Physical Mediumship near Mirepoix, France where he lived with his friends Kevin Lawrenson (Spiritual Healer) and Thomas Morris (Physical Medium)

== Works ==
- Castle, Charles (1982). The Folies Bergère. Methuen. ISBN 978-0-413-49470-2.
- Castle, Charles (2 December 2021). The Duchess Who Dared: The Life of Margaret, Duchess of Argyll. Swift Press. ISBN 978-1-80075-080-7.
- Castle, Charles (1981). La Belle Otero: The Last Great Courtesan. M. Joseph. ISBN 978-0-7181-1935-5.
