= André Charlot =

French impresario (1882–1956)

- Charlot in 1912
- Born: Eugène André Maurice Charlot; 26 July 1882; Paris
- Died: 20 May 1956 (aged 73); Woodland Hills, Los Angeles
- Occupations: Actor and theatre manager
- Spouse: Florence Gladman (m. 1956)
- Children: 2

Eugène André Maurice Charlot (English: /ʃɑːrˈloʊ/ shar-LOH, French: [øʒɛn ɑ̃dʁe mɔʁis ʃaʁlo]; 26 July 1882 – 20 May 1956) was a French-born impresario known primarily for the musical revues he staged in London between 1912 and 1937. He later worked as a character actor in numerous American films.

Born in Paris, where his father was a theatre manager, Charlot made most of his pre-Second World War career in the West End of London, where he successfully imported and adapted the Parisian genre of intimate revue. He was known for his ability in talent spotting and played an important part in the early careers of many performers, composers and writers, including Jack Buchanan, Noël Coward, Jack Hulbert, Gertrude Lawrence, Beatrice Lillie, Jessie Matthews and Ivor Novello.

== Life and career ==
=== Early years ===
Charlot was born in Paris on 26 July 1882, the eldest of three children of Jules Charles Maurice Charlot and his wife, Jeanne Sargine née Battu. Charlot senior was a theatre manager and secretary of the Parisian Association of Theatre Directors; his wife was the daughter of a Swiss goldsmith. It was an affluent household, based in the Rue Boissy d'Anglas near the Place de la Concorde, with staff including an English governess for the children.

Charlot studied first at the Lycée Condorcet and then at the Paris Conservatoire before working for his father. His biographer James Ross Moore records that by 1902 Charlot was writing theatrical news and gossip for Parisian magazines and travelling to London to sign talent for the Théâtre du Châtelet. In 1905 he was appointed assistant manager, under his father, of the newly restored Théâtre du Palais-Royal, after which he moved to the Folies-Bergère in 1908 as business manager. In 1910 he opened a theatrical agency in Paris. On 5 August 1911 he married an English dancer, Florence Gladman (1891–1956). They had one son and one daughter.

Among those for whom Charlot's agency provided performers was the English actor and impresario George Grossmith, Jr. who invited Charlot to work for him in London. From 1912 to 1914 Charlot was the manager of the Alhambra in Leicester Square, one of the West End's larger theatres, with a capacity of 4,000, presenting spectacular, large-scale shows.

=== Peak years ===
In 1914 the British impresario Charles B. Cochran had an unexpected box-office success in the West End with what Moore calls a "bare-bones" revue. His Odds and Ends, starring his discovery Alice Delysia, dispensed with spectacular décor and huge casts in favour of a more intimate style with modest staging – one critic commented that Cochran had spared no economy in mounting the revue. The style appealed to the public and the show ran for more than 500 performances. Charlot, familiar with intimate revue from his years in Paris, was quick to follow Cochran's example in London.

Gertrude Lawrence in Charlot's London Calling (1923)

Lawrence with Noël Coward in London Calling

The writer Eric Maschwitz says of Charlot:

Endowed with an almost feminine artistic taste and a shrewd eye for theatrical talent on the performing side, he produced between 1915 and 1935 thirty-six revues in the west end of London [including] 5064 Gerrard (1915), Some (1916), Buzz-Buzz (1918), Jumble Sale (1920), Pot Luck and A to Z (1921), Charlot's Revue 1924–5, Charlot's Show of 1926, Charlot's Masquerade (1930), and Charlot's Char-a-Bang! (1935).

For his revues Charlot chose theatres of modest size, such as the Vaudeville, which seated 700. A typical Charlot show featured a small orchestra, and onstage up to six stars backed by an ensemble who could all sing, dance and act. Imaginative lighting replaced opulent stage sets, allowing for quick changes of scene between short sketches. Moore writes that to this formula Charlot added an "undefinable style".

Charlot was adept at discovering and encouraging new talent. Among the performers he featured at or near the beginning of their careers were Binnie Hale, Gertrude Lawrence, Beatrice Lillie, Jessie Matthews, Phyllis Monkman, Jack Buchanan and Jack Hulbert. His writers included Ronald Jeans and Dion Titheradge; among the composers were Ivor Novello and Philip Braham; and, as writer, composer and performer, there was Noël Coward, who co-wrote and co-starred in Charlot's London Calling (1923–24), for which Fred Astaire provided choreography.

Coward learned from Charlot that it was not enough for a revue to have first-rate songs and sketches: it was vital to present them in the most effective order. Coward recalled:

He would have the names of all the numbers in the revue printed on separate cards, place them on his desk and then, as though playing Patience, juggle with them and go on moving them about, shifting them again and again until he was satisfied that they were in the right running order.

Charlot kept his revues fresh by renewing the numbers during a run. There were, for instance, three editions of London Calling with new songs and sketches added to the second and third.

Charlot had a major success on Broadway with Charlot's Revue of 1924, a compilation of numbers and sketches, mainly by Coward, from Charlot's West End shows. It took New York by storm – The Daily News reported "The Charlot Revue sets crowd cheering" – established Buchanan, Lawrence, Lillie and Matthews on the New York stage and, in the words of the theatre historians Mander and Mitchenson, "at last established intimate revue on the other side of the Atlantic". The show ran on Broadway for 298 performances and then went on tour in the US and Canada.

According to Maschwitz, Charlot was the first leading London producer to recognise the potentialities of broadcasting, associating himself actively with the production of almost fifty Charlot's Hour programmes for BBC radio.

=== Later years ===
With the Great Depression, theatre attendance dropped dramatically, and Charlot was forced into temporary bankruptcy after the failure of his revue Wonder Bar in 1930. That same year he collaborated with Alfred Hitchcock, Hulbert, and Paul Murray on direction of the film Elstree Calling. After producing a series of smaller London revues, he moved to Hollywood, where between 1942 and 1955 he appeared in 50 films, often in small, uncredited roles. According to Moore his most memorable role was the probably "the fearsomely condemning cardinal" in The Song of Bernadette.

Charlot had taken British citizenship in 1922, and American citizenship in 1944. He died in Hollywood on 20 May 1956 and was buried there on 25 May.

== Films ==
Year	Title	Role	Notes
1942	The Falcon's Brother	Leon Savitski	Uncredited
1942	Here We Go Again	Indian Chief	Uncredited
1942	Arabian Nights	Bidder	Uncredited
1943	The Falcon Strikes Back	Bruno Steffen	
1943	They Came to Blow Up America	Zugholtz	
1943	Above Suspicion	Paris Cafe Manager	Uncredited
1943	The Constant Nymph	Dr. Renee	
1943	Thumbs Up	E. E. Cartwright	
1943	The Man from Down Under	Father Antoine	
1943	The Fallen Sparrow	Pete	Uncredited
1943	Melody Parade	Carroll White	
1943	The Song of Bernadette	Bishop of Nevers	Uncredited
1944	Passage to Marseille	Judge	Uncredited
1944	Action in Arabia	Andre Leroux	
1944	The Heavenly Body	Dr. Burns	Uncredited
1944	Summer Storm	Mr Kalenin	
1945	Delightfully Dangerous	Prof. Bremond	Uncredited
1945	Lady on a Train	Man with Carnation	Uncredited
1945	The Dolly Sisters	Monsieur Philippe	Uncredited
1945	Paris Underground	Patriot	Uncredited
1945	This Love of Ours	M. Flambertin	
1945	Yolanda and the Thief	Dilettante	Uncredited
1945	What Next, Corporal Hargrove?	Restaurant Proprietor	Uncredited
1946	O.S.S.	French Importer	Uncredited
1946	Deadline for Murder	Gordon	Uncredited
1946	Rolling Home	Dr Clark	
1946	The Razor's Edge	Bishop at Elliott's Deathbed	Uncredited
1946	Temptation	Prof. Dupont	
1946	The Falcon's Adventure	Enrico Braganza	Uncredited
1947	The Foxes of Harrow	Dr. Terrebone	Uncredited
1947	Song of Love	Pompous Gent	Uncredited
1947	Mourning Becomes Electra	Dr. André Hamel - Christine's Father	Uncredited
1948	Saigon	Priest	Uncredited
1948	Julia Misbehaves	Theater Doorman	Uncredited
1949	The Great Sinner	Distinguished Man	Uncredited
1949	I Was a Male War Bride	French Minister	Uncredited
1949	That Forsyte Woman	Gallery Director in Paris	Uncredited
1950	Under My Skin	Waiter	Uncredited
1950	Annie Get Your Gun	French President Emile Loubet	Uncredited
1950	The Toast of New Orleans	Dignified Man	Uncredited
1950	Breakthrough		
1950	The Du Pont Story	Peter Bauduy	
1951	Rich, Young and Pretty	Justice of the Peace	Uncredited
1951	The Law and the Lady	Maire D'Hotel	Uncredited
1951	Here Comes the Groom	French Doctor	Uncredited
1951	Flame of Araby	Court Physician	Uncredited
1952	Lovely to Look At	Creditor	Uncredited
1952	The Snows of Kilimanjaro	Guest	Uncredited
1953	The Mississippi Gambler	Keith	Uncredited
1954	Rhapsody	Stage Doorman	Uncredited
1955	Interrupted Melody	Monsieur Bertrand	Uncredited, (final film role)

Source: British Film Institute.

=== Sources ===
- Mander, Raymond; Joe Mitchenson (1968). Lost Theatres of London. London: Rupert Hart-Davis. OCLC 41974.
- Mander, Raymond; Joe Mitchenson (1971). Revue: A Story in Pictures. London: Peter Davies. ISBN 978-0-43-209076-3.
- Mander, Raymond; Joe Mitchenson (2000) [1957]. Barry Day; Sheridan Morley (eds.). Theatrical Companion to Coward (second ed.). London: Oberon Books. ISBN 978-1-84002-054-0.
- Parker, John, ed. (1922). Who's Who in the Theatre (fourth ed.). London: Sir Isaac Pitman and Sons. OCLC 473894893.
