= Gertrude Lawrence =

English performing artist (1898–1952)

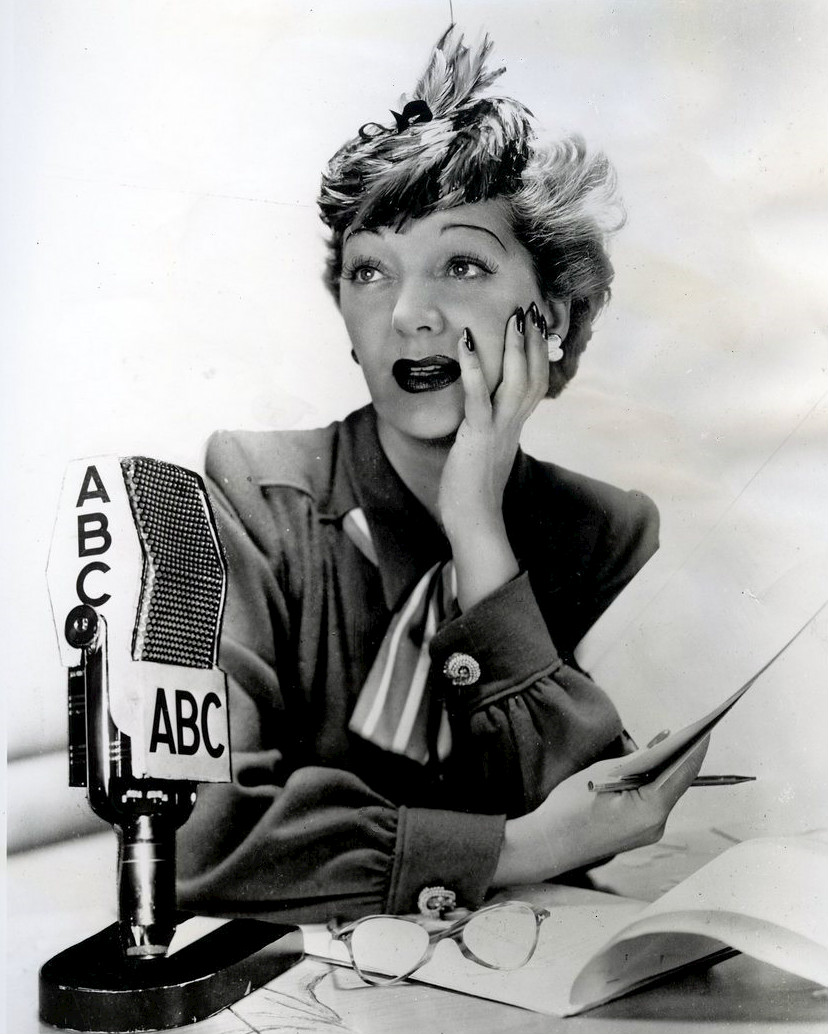
- Lawrence in 1947
- Born: Gertrude Alice Dagmar Klasen; 4 July 1898; London, England
- Died: 6 September 1952 (aged 54); New York City, U.S.
- Other names: Alexandra Dagmar Lawrence-Klasen; Gertrude Alexandra Dagmar Klasen
- Education: Italia Conti Academy of Theatre Arts
- Occupations: Actress; singer; dancer; musical comedy performer
- Years active: 1916–1952
- Spouses: Francis Gordon-Howley (m. 1917; div. 1927); Richard Aldrich (m. 1940)

Gertrude Lawrence (4 July 1898 – 6 September 1952) was an English actress, singer, dancer and musical comedy performer known for her stage appearances in the West End of London and on Broadway in New York.

== Early life ==
Lawrence was born in 1898 in Newington, London, of English and Danish descent. Her name at birth was registered as Gertrude Alice Dagmar Klasen. Other variants of her birth name include Alexandra Dagmar Lawrence-Klasen, and Gertrude Alexandra Dagmar Klasen.

Her father was a basso profondo who performed under the name Arthur Lawrence. His heavy drinking led her mother Alice to leave him soon after Gertrude's birth.

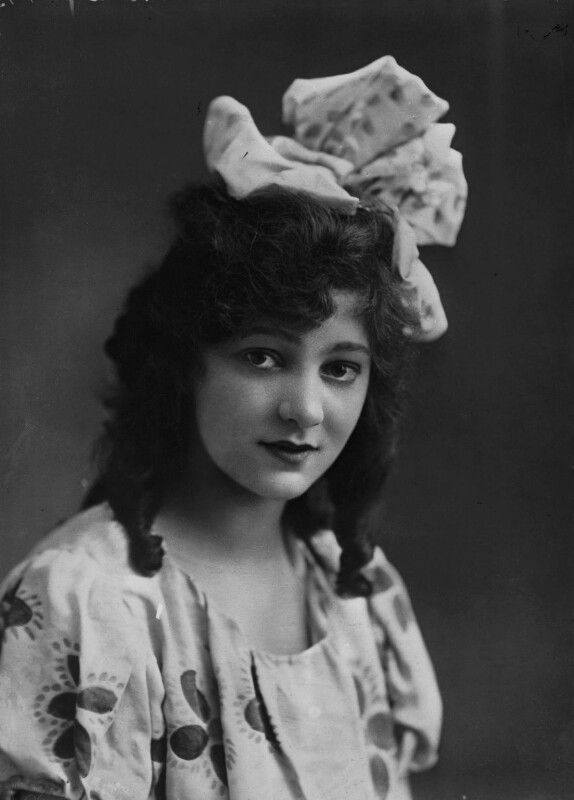
Lawrence in 1917

In 1904, her stepfather took the family to Bognor on the Sussex coast for the August bank holiday. While there, they attended a concert where audience members were invited to entertain. At her mother's urging, young Gertrude sang a song and was rewarded with a gold sovereign for her effort. It was her first public performance.

In 1908, to augment the family's meagre income, Alice accepted a job in the chorus of the Christmas pantomime at Brixton Theatre. A child who could sing and dance was needed to round out the troupe, and Alice volunteered her daughter. While working in the production Alice heard of Italia Conti, who taught dance, elocution and the rudiments of acting. Gertrude auditioned for Conti, who thought the child was talented enough to warrant free lessons.

She joined Italia Conti's production of Where the Rainbow Ends; (Conti's training of the cast would lead her to form the Italia Conti Academy of Theatre Arts in 1911.) Conti's training led to Lawrence's appearance in Max Reinhardt's The Miracle staged in London and Fifinella, directed by Basil Dean, for the Liverpool Repertory Theatre. At some point during this period, the child decided to adopt her father's professional surname as her own. Dean then cast her in his next production, Gerhart Hauptmann's Hannele, where she first met Noël Coward. Their meeting was the start of a close and sometimes tempestuous friendship and arguably the most important professional relationship in both their lives.

== Early stage career ==
Following Hannele, Lawrence reconnected with her father, who was living with a chorus girl. They agreed to let her tour with them in two successive revues, after which Arthur announced he had signed a year-long contract with a variety show in South Africa, leaving the two young women to fend for themselves. Lawrence, now aged sixteen, opted to live at the Theatrical Girls' Club in Soho rather than return to her mother and stepfather.

She worked steadily with various touring companies until 1916, when she was hired by impresario André Charlot to understudy Beatrice Lillie and appear in the chorus of his latest production in London's West End. When it closed, she assumed Lillie's role on tour, then returned to London once again to understudy the star in another Charlot production, where she met dance director Francis Gordon-Howley. Although he was twenty years her senior, the two wed and soon after had a daughter Pamela, born on 28 May 1918, who was Lawrence's only child. The marriage was not a success, and Lawrence took Pamela with her to her mother's home in Clapham. The couple remained separated but did not divorce until ten years later.

In 1918, either during Lawrence's pregnancy or shortly after she gave birth, she contracted lumbago. Charlot gave her two weeks to recuperate. He saw Lawrence at an opening night party at Ivor Novello's invitation two days before she was cleared to return to work by her doctor. Charlot immediately fired her. When the apparent reason for her dismissal became common knowledge among other West End theatrical producers, she was allegedly unable to find work, according to some sources. (The veracity of this information is put in doubt by a theatre programme for the opening performance of Charlot's revue Buzz Buzz on 20 December 1918, which clearly shows that Lawrence was in the cast at that time, and there is no evidence that she could have left the cast during its 613-performance run that ended on 13 March 1920.)

In early 1919, Lawrence accepted a job singing at Murray's, a popular London nightclub, where she remained for the better part of the next two years. While performing there she met Captain Philip Astley, a member of the Household Cavalry. He became her friend, escort, and ultimately lover, and taught her how to dress and behave in high society.

At the end of 1920, Lawrence left Murray's and began to ease her way back into the legitimate theatre while touring in a music hall act as the partner of popular singer Walter Williams. In October 1921, Charlot asked her to replace an ailing Beatrice Lillie as star of his latest production, A to Z, opposite Jack Buchanan. In it the two introduced the song "Limehouse Blues," which went on to become one of Lawrence's signature tunes.

With Noël Coward in London Calling!

In 1923, Noël Coward developed his first musical revue, London Calling!, specifically for Lawrence. Charlot agreed to produce it, but brought in more experienced writers and composers to work on the book and score. One of Coward's surviving songs was "Parisian Pierrot", a tune that would be identified closely with Lawrence throughout her career.

The show's success led its producer to create André Charlot's London Revue of 1924, which he took to Broadway with Lawrence, Lillie, Jack Buchanan and Constance Carpenter. It was so successful it moved to a larger Broadway theatre to accommodate the demand for tickets, extending its run. After it closed, the show toured the United States and Canada, although Lawrence was forced to leave the cast when she contracted double pneumonia and pleurisy and was forced to spend fourteen weeks in a Toronto hospital recuperating.

Charlot's Revue of 1926, starring Lawrence, Lillie, and Jack Buchanan, opened on Broadway in late 1925. In his review, Alexander Woollcott singled out Lawrence, calling her "the personification of style and sophistication" and "the ideal star." Like its predecessor, it toured following the Broadway run. It proved to be Lawrence's last project with Charlot. In November 1926, she became the first British performer to star in an American musical on Broadway when she opened in Oh, Kay!, with music by George Gershwin, lyrics by Ira Gershwin, and a book by Guy Bolton and P.G. Wodehouse. Following a run of 256 performances, the musical opened in London’s West End, where it ran for 213 performances.

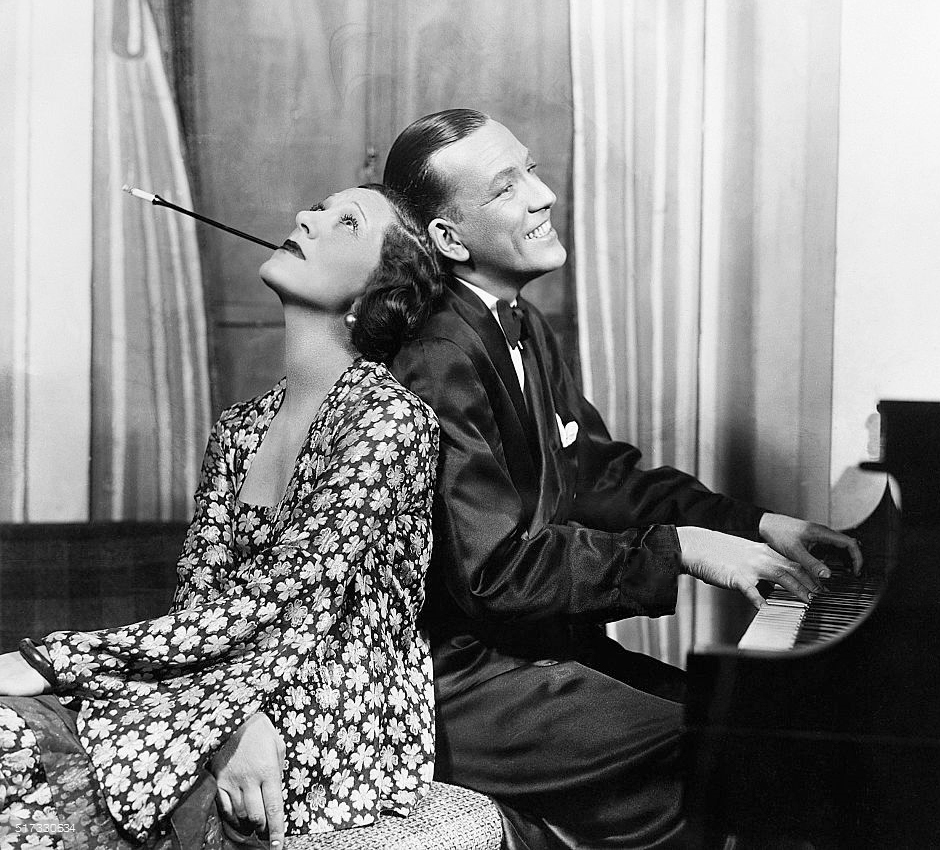
Lawrence and Noël Coward in Private Lives

When Lawrence became romantically involved with Wall Street banker Bert Taylor in 1927, Philip Astley proposed marriage, an offer Lawrence refused because she knew Astley would expect her to leave the stage and settle in rural England. The two remained close until he married actress Madeleine Carroll in 1931. When Lawrence divorced Francis Gordon-Howley, she and Taylor became engaged and remained so for two years, with each free to enjoy a social life separate from the other.

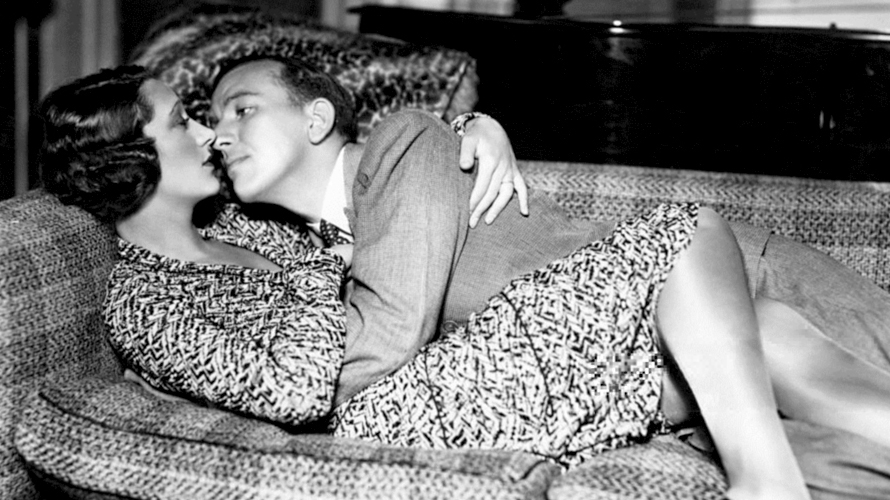
Lawrence and Noël Coward in the Broadway production of Private Lives (1931)

In 1928, Lawrence returned to Broadway opposite Clifton Webb in Treasure Girl, a Gershwin work she was confident would be a huge hit. Anticipating a long run, she arrived in New York with her daughter Pamela, a personal maid and two cars, and settled into a flat on Park Avenue. Her instincts about the musical were wrong; audiences had difficulty accepting her as an avaricious woman who double-crosses her lover, and it ran for only 68 performances. She starred opposite Leslie Howard in Candle Light, an Austrian play adapted by Wodehouse, in 1929, and in 1930–31 she and Noël Coward triumphed in his play Private Lives, first in the UK, and later on Broadway. In 1930, Johnny Green composed his most famous song "Body and Soul" especially for Gertrude Lawrence.

While working in Manhattan, Lawrence started studying with vocal coach Estelle Liebling to prepare for her performances on the Broadway stage. Lawrence continued to study with Liebling for many years.

== Later stage career ==
In 1936, Lawrence and Coward starred in Tonight at 8.30, a cycle of ten one-act plays he had written specifically for the two of them. In 1937, she appeared in the Rachel Crothers drama Susan and God; NBC televised a performance of some scenes, with Lawrence and the Broadway cast using duplicate stage sets in its studios.

Lawrence also starred in 1939's Skylark, a comedy by Samson Raphaelson. Lawrence felt the play needed work prior to opening on Broadway, and a run at the Cape Playhouse in Dennis, Massachusetts, was arranged. The theatre was run by Broadway producer Richard Aldrich, and he and the actress became involved in a romantic relationship. The two wed on her birthday in 1940 and remained married until her death in 1952. They had homes in Dennis and in Turtle Bay, Manhattan.

In June 1941, Lawrence's daughter Pamela married a New York doctor named William G. Cahan. The ceremony was held at the Dennis home of Lawrence and Aldrich. Lawrence was friendly with her son-in-law but lost contact with him after his 1950 divorce from Pamela, according to Cahan's memoir that was published in 1992. Lawrence did not have any grandchildren during her lifetime.

Lawrence returned to the musical stage in Lady in the Dark in 1941. It originally had been planned as a play with recurrent musical themes for Katharine Cornell by Moss Hart, Kurt Weill and Ira Gershwin, but by the time the first act was completed it was clear it was very much a musical that Cornell agreed was beyond her capability as a performer. Soon after this, Hart met Lawrence at a rehearsal for a revue designed to raise funds for British War Relief, and he offered her the role of Liza Elliott, a magazine editor undergoing psychoanalysis to better understand why both her professional and personal lives are filled with indecision.

The show was very ambitious and stretched the star's talents for singing, dancing and acting. Her performance prompted Richard Watts of the New York Herald Tribune to call her "the greatest feminine performer in the American theatre," and Brooks Atkinson described her as "a goddess" in his review in The New York Times. She remained with the show throughout its Broadway run and its subsequent national tour over the next three years.

Decades later, Ira Gershwin told American songwriting historian Sheila Davis about a contribution Lawrence made to honing the lyrics of the song "My Ship" in Lady in the Dark. "During a Lady in the Dark rehearsal," Davis wrote, "Gertrude Lawrence suddenly stopped singing midline and called out to Gershwin, who was monitoring from the orchestra, 'Why does she say "I could wait four years" – why not five or six?' Of course, the line was 'I could wait for years.' The painstaking lyricist immediately substituted the to clarify the aural ambiguity."

In 1945, Lawrence starred as Eliza Doolittle opposite Raymond Massey as Henry Higgins in a revival of Pygmalion by George Bernard Shaw, who initially resisted the idea of Lawrence playing the role. Following the Broadway run, she toured the United States (including a stint in Washington, D.C.) and Canada in the play until May 1947.

== Autobiography ==
In 1945, Lawrence published the autobiography A Star Danced. Her long-term friend Noël Coward later suggested it was a romanticised and less than wholly factual account of her life. The author embarked on a cross-country tour of the United States to publicise her book, the first person to engage in such a promotion.

== World War II ==
Lawrence's second husband Richard Aldrich became a lieutenant in the United States Navy during World War II, during which time Lawrence had a standing invitation to perform for British troops from the head of the UK's Entertainments National Service Association. Her chief obstacle was getting from her home in Massachusetts to Britain. Aldrich was overseas at the time. In her 1945 memoir A Star Danced, she recalled, "After weeks of more or less patient waiting, repeated timid, pleading, urgent and finally importunate requests to the authorities who rule such matters in Washington and London, and a rapid-fire barrage of telegrams, cables and telephone calls, it had happened. At last I had permission to do what I had been wanting desperately to do for four years—go to England and do my bit on a tour for E.N.S.A."

Lawrence's attorney booked the actress on a British Airways charter flight from Washington, D.C., to an airfield near London; the flight lasted 36 hours, including two refueling stops. When Lawrence boarded the plane, she discovered that she, Ernest Hemingway and Beatrice Lillie were among the few passengers without diplomatic passports. Lawrence and Lillie were the only female passengers. Hours after landing near London, she performed with E.N.S.A. for British and American troops who, it turned out, had been deployed for the imminent D-Day landings in Normandy. Aldrich was in one of the squadrons of the US Navy.

Aldrich wrote in his 1954 biography of his recently deceased wife:

She went over with the first E.N.S.A. unit to go into France, making the crossing in an LST). Others in the party included Ivor Novello, Margaret Rutherford, Diana Wynyard and Bobbie Andrews. In her autobiography, A Star Danced, she has given a graphic account of their landing on a Normandy beach and of the progress of her unit through the wrecked towns, where there was still no water or electricity. Shows were given in shell-torn cinemas and hastily lighted casinos.

The physical discomforts – the sleeping in attics, the total lack of sanitation, the scanty and poor food – Gertrude could and did take as fortunes of war. What bothered her more was the breakdown in communications with me. Always dependent upon getting frequent letters from those she loved, she chafed and worried because no mail reached her.

As Allied forces scored more victories in the South Pacific later that year, Lawrence endured long plane rides and dangerous conditions to perform for troops there. The Aldrich book includes a photograph of Lawrence and two unidentified performers standing next to a military plane in Angaur that had just transported them there from Ulithi.

== Professional and personal connection to Daphne du Maurier ==
In 1948, Lawrence returned to the United Kingdom to star in September Tide, a play written specifically for her by Daphne du Maurier. Her role was that of a middle-aged Cornish woman whose son-in-law, a bohemian artist, falls in love with her. The playwright had intended her to open the play on Broadway, but Lawrence's husband thought it was too British for the American market.

London newspapers and magazines paid little attention to her return to the stage, and she was distressed to discover that in a country struggling to recover from the effects of World War II, the public no longer was as interested in the careers or private lives of stage stars as it once had been. Prior to opening in the West End, the play toured Blackpool, Leeds, Liverpool, and Manchester, where the frequently sparse audiences consisted primarily of elderly people who remembered Lawrence from her heyday. While on the road, she underwent erratic mood swings and frequently clashed with her fellow cast members, including actors Michael Gough and Bryan Forbes, and the crew. The play opened in London in mid-December 1948.

Writing in Punch, Eric Keown called her return "an occasion for rejoicing" but dismissed the play as "an artificial piece of conventional sentiment which leaves the actress's talents unused." She remained with the play until July 1949, then returned to the United States, where she performed her role for one week at her husband's theatre in Dennis, Massachusetts.

According to a 1993 biography of author-playwright du Maurier by Margaret Forster, Lawrence and du Maurier became close friends during the London production of September Tide. The nature of their relationship remained unclear following the 1989 death of du Maurier. Forster quotes du Maurier as saying the following about Lawrence circa 1949, "To be blatantly vulgar, anyone with a spice of imagination would prefer a divan with Gertrude to a double-bed with her."

Lawrence biographer Sheridan Morley interviewed du Maurier for his 1981 book Gertrude Lawrence. Du Maurier was quoted as saying she called Lawrence by the nickname "Cinders," short for Cinderella. Either while negotiating to appear in September Tide or rehearsing it, Lawrence stayed in "a flat in London somewhere," according to what du Maurier told Morley decades later. Boiling water in her tea kettle for a visitor was stressful for Lawrence. Du Maurier also told the biographer that she had forgotten all the dialogue she had written for September Tide and that shortly before her interview with Morley she had "been searching my shelves for a copy of the play. ... I cannot remember how Cinders looked, what she wore, far less what she said." Du Maurier's contribution to the Morley biography of Lawrence consists of little more than that.

Nothing about a personal connection between Gertrude Lawrence and Daphne du Maurier was published during Lawrence's lifetime. Two years after Lawrence's death, her widower Richard Aldrich had this to say in a best-selling biography of his late wife, Gertrude Lawrence as Mrs. A.:

All her ingenuous traits, which could be annoying as well as endearing, would be swept away by her courage, her clear perception of truth, and the divine compassion which could flood her heart and lift her to the heights of nobility.

I am sure that she was frequently bewildered by the rapidity and mutability of her own impulses. Possessed, as she was, of an intuitive rather than an analytical intelligence, I doubt that she really understood herself clearly, any more than did most of those who thought they knew her intimately. An exception in this regard was Daphne du Maurier.

During those months in England [when September Tide was in production], Gertrude and Daphne formed a warm friendship, which continued unbroken after Gertrude's return to America. Daphne later returned the visit by being Gertrude's guest in New York. Daphne's subsequent best-selling novel Mary Anne was originally planned as a possible starring vehicle for Gertrude.

It was chiefly from comments made later by Daphne that I was able to reconstruct the full picture of Gertrude's inner conflict during her stay in London. Daphne spoke of Gertrude's moodiness, her variability, her sense of vague self-dissatisfaction. To other English friends, Gertrude talked wistfully of wanting to remain in England, "where I belong."

After du Maurier's death in 1989, some writers speculated about her alleged physical relationships with a number of women, including Ellen Doubleday, the wife of her United States publisher Nelson Doubleday, and Gertrude Lawrence. A close relationship between du Maurier and Lawrence was fictionalized in the 2007 BBC Two film Daphne. (Note: Du Maurier's alleged affairs with Ellen Doubleday and Gertrude Lawrence were the subject of the 2007 BBC Two film, Daphne) Offspring of both du Maurier and Lawrence have objected strongly to the stories about the alleged relationship between their mothers. Lawrence’s daughter Pamela Clatworthy told London-based entertainment writer Michael Thornton in 2009: “It makes me laugh when I keep hearing stories about my mother supposedly being a lesbian. She was the complete reverse. Her appetite for men verged on nymphomania." Clatworthy personally witnessed a romantic tryst between her mother and Yul Brynner in her mother’s dressing room in the St. James Theatre during the Broadway run of The King and I. This happened in April 1951, as Clatworthy told Thornton. (Note: Michael Thornton is a British author and journalist known for books like The Animal Garden and Pissed Off, often focusing on quirky, cultural, or historical subjects, sometimes with a Japanese or British angle, and has written for various publications.)

== Film career ==
Between 1929 and 1950, Lawrence appeared in only nine films. She made her screen debut in 1929 in The Battle of Paris, which featured two songs by Cole Porter. Paramount Pictures offered her the film shortly after the Broadway production of Treasure Girl unexpectedly closed and, with no prospects of stage work in the immediate future, she accepted the offer. The film, co-starring Arthur Treacher and Charles Ruggles, was shot in Paramount's Astoria Studio complex in Astoria, Queens. Lawrence was cast as Georgie, an artist living in pre-World War I Paris, who becomes a cabaret singer and falls in love with an American soldier. Publicity for the film emphasised Lawrence's songs and costumes rather than the story, which was so weak that director Robert Florey had threatened to resign midway through filming. Described by one critic as a "floperetta", it was not a success.

In 1932, Lawrence appeared in three features: an adaptation of the Frederick Lonsdale play Aren't We All? directed by Harry Lachman; Lord Camber's Ladies, produced by Alfred Hitchcock, directed by Benn W. Levy, and co-starring Gerald du Maurier; and No Funny Business with Laurence Olivier. In 1935, she appeared in Mimi, based on La Vie de Bohème. The following year she was cast opposite Charles Laughton and Elsa Lanchester in Rembrandt and co-starred with Rex Harrison in Men are Not Gods, both produced by Alexander Korda.

Lawrence's best-known American film role was that of Amanda Wingfield, the overbearing mother in The Glass Menagerie (1950), which both Bette Davis and Tallulah Bankhead had sought. The role required her to wear padding and affect a Southern American accent, and friends and critics questioned her decision to accept it. Tennessee Williams, who had written the play, thought casting Lawrence was "a dismal error" and, after the film's release, called it the worst adaptation of his work he had seen thus far. Bosley Crowther of The New York Times called her Amanda "a farcically exaggerated shrew with the zeal of a burlesque comedienne" and "a perfect imitation of a nervous Mama in domestic comedy". Writing about her performance in Saturday Review, Richard Griffith was generous in his praise, saying "Not since Garbo has there been anything like the naked eloquence of her face, with its amazing play of thought and emotion."

== Television and radio ==
On Tuesday night, 7 June 1938, the Broadway theatre that featured Susan and God went dark for one night so that Lawrence and her fellow cast members could perform the play for NBC's emerging television audience, which then consisted mostly of "company executives and engineers" of NBC's parent company RCA, according to a Life magazine report of the historic television broadcast. The number of television receivers that could pick up the telecast, all of them in or very close to New York City, was not estimated by the Life magazine writer.

The text of the Life article says the following about the few Susan and God viewers who were not employed by RCA: ". . . amateurs [sic] interested in television today generally construct their own receiving sets at home . . ." (emphasis added). At that time, RCA did not yet have an already-constructed television set available for purchase at a store.

Viewers not employed by RCA or able to build television sets are described as "drama critics and radio columnists" who "witnessed the performance on sets many floors above the studios where" the Susan and God cast performed. The building is referred to by the Life writer as "New York's Radio City," that is, 30 Rockefeller Plaza. A caption for one of the still photos of the live telecast indicates that a view of the exterior of the "giant RCA building" was the final image that viewers saw while a voice-over identified it as the origin of the television broadcast.

Many still photos from the live telecast were featured in the Life article, which was published almost two weeks later in the edition dated 20 June 1938. The event was newsworthy because it was the first full-length play live-broadcast on television. The text of the article says that technology required the actors to perform in a studio at 30 Rockefeller Plaza that RCA engineers had designed, during construction of the skyscraper five years earlier, for the anticipated medium of television. Primitive television cameras and lighting could not function properly inside a Broadway theatre.

In 1943, Lawrence hosted a weekly series of American radio shows, some of them featuring discussions with guests and others adaptations of Hollywood hit films. In 1947, she returned to NBC for a production of the 1913 Shaw play The Great Catherine.

To promote The King and I, Lawrence appeared on various television programs, including the Ed Sullivan-hosted Toast of the Town, with Rodgers and Hammerstein joining her to perform selections from the show.

Additionally, she appeared on several BBC Radio interview and variety shows before and after World War II.

== Financial difficulties ==
Throughout her adult life, except during World War II, Lawrence spent far more than she earned. Philip Astley had persuaded her to place £1,000 in a trust fund for her daughter, but aside from that she had no savings of her own. During her engagement to Bert Taylor he managed her finances and encouraged her to invest in the productions in which she starred. Although she earned a considerable amount of money from Private Lives, she still was deeply in debt, at one point owing fashion entrepreneur Hattie Carnegie more than $10,000. She opened accounts with dozens of shop owners but assumed she had unlimited credit and paid little attention to the invoices they sent.

Finally, two London laundry owners, whose bills totalled just under £50, filed a writ demanding she declare bankruptcy if she was unable to settle her accounts, and Lawrence's financial affairs came under the scrutiny of the Official Receiver. On 26 February 1935, the Daily Mirror reported her assets were valued at £1,879 but her liabilities were nearly £35,000, with an additional £10,000 owed to the Inland Revenue on her earnings in the United States.

Later in 1935, Lawrence's flat, cars, clothing, and jewellery were seized by the "London bankruptcy court" (words used by the Associated Press), and Lawrence, her maid and her dog were forced to move into a flat owned by her agent. On 8 November 1935, accused of "gross extravagance," she was ordered "to pay £50 weekly from the proceeds of her present [nightclub] engagement, and 25 per cent of anything earned any other way should the engagement end," according to the same Associated Press report.

It was later discovered that Lawrence had never paid American taxes, either. Her attorney Fanny Holtzmann worked out an agreement whereby $150 would be deducted from her salary each week she worked in the United States until her American tax debt was settled.

Refusing to lower her standard of living, she decided to take film work during the day, appear on stage at night, and perform in late-night cabarets to support her spending habits. Much to the distress of her agent, she purchased a country house and farm in Buckinghamshire, then left it vacant while she remained in the United States for a lengthy stay. When her agent questioned the wisdom of such a move, she replied asking him to investigate the cost of installing a swimming pool on the property.

== Columbia University ==
"Early in September [1951, during the Broadway run of The King and I]", wrote Lawrence's widower Richard Aldrich, "she calmly announced that she had accepted an appointment to the Faculty of Columbia University, in the School of Dramatic Arts, of which Dr. Milton Smith was Director. Her particular post was to conduct Class 107 in the Study of Roles and Scenes. The class met on Thursday afternoons in the Brander Matthews Theatre on Morningside Heights."

"I shall be teaching an advanced, not an elementary course," Aldrich quoted her as saying in 1951. "Dr. Smith and I have screened all the students. They've had preliminary work in voice, speech and pantomime. Many of them are already working professionally in radio and television. But, more than that, if I can find one person of real talent and encourage and train him, I'll feel that I've done something worthwhile." The New York Times reported on 28 September 1951 that Lawrence "suffered an attack of stage fright yesterday and refused to let reporters observe her in her new role of teacher at Columbia University."

She taught the class again in the spring 1952 semester at Columbia, this time allowing a New York Times reporter and photographer to attend and take pictures.

== The King and I ==
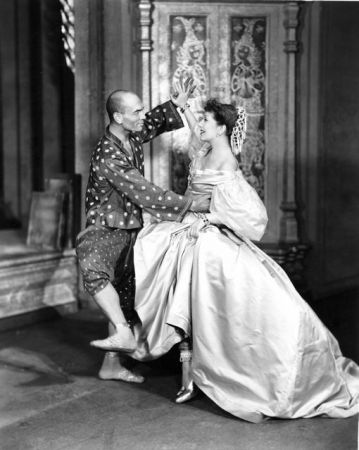
Yul Brynner and Gertrude Lawrence in the stage musical The King and I

The King and I got started when, in 1950, Lawrence's business manager and attorney Fanny Holtzmann was looking for a new property for her client. Lawrence went to see the film Anna and the King of Siam with her mother-in-law then asked Fanny Holtzmann to look into acquiring the rights to the book. A William Morris agent sent Holtzmann a copy of the 1944 book Anna and the King of Siam, by his client Margaret Landon. Lawrence thought a musical version would be better. Lawrence wanted Cole Porter to write the score, but when he proved to be unenthusiastic about the suggestion, Lawrence sent the book to Richard Rodgers and Oscar Hammerstein II. Rodgers initially demurred because he felt Lawrence's vocal range was limited and she had a tendency to sing flat. But he realized the story had strong potential, and the two men agreed to write what ultimately became The King and I.

The musical opened on Broadway in March 1951, and in 1952, Lawrence won the Tony Award for Best Actress in a Musical.

Her triumph was short-lived; her health deteriorated rapidly, forcing her to miss numerous performances until she finally was hospitalized with what would be her final illness. While bedridden in New York Hospital on Friday afternoon, 5 September 1952, she instructed Fanny Holtzmann to arrange for co-star Yul Brynner's name to be added to the marquee of the St. James Theatre, which included only Lawrence's name at the time.

== Death and funeral ==
On 16 August 1952, Lawrence fainted backstage after a Saturday matinee of The King and I. After "a few days at home," wrote her husband Richard Aldrich, she was admitted for tests to what was then called New York Hospital. Doctors said she was suffering from hepatitis, and she was admitted to a room on the 16th floor. Her former son-in-law, Dr. William G. Cahan, recalled in his 1992 memoir (by then he was a globally recognised medical expert on cancer) what happened next in 1952:

She was admitted to New York Hospital [located across the street from the hospital where Cahan worked on the staff]. Her doctors were puzzled by what was described in the press as "a liver problem," and suspected that she might have cancer. Hearing this, and without Gertrude's knowledge, her husband [Dick Aldrich] consulted me. Not wanting to alarm her by appearing in person (she knew, of course, that by now I was a cancer specialist), I sent some of my colleagues as consultants. They, too, were puzzled, and ordered an exploratory laparotomy (abdominal operation).

At dawn of the day the operation was to take place [Saturday, September 6], Dick Aldrich called [Cahan on the telephone]: Gertrude had become comatose; would I please come to the hospital at once? I found her surrounded by interns frantically pumping intravenous fluids and stimulants into her. As I bent over her, she opened her eyes for a second or two, looked up at me, and made a face as if to say, "What are you doing here?"

A few minutes later, she died.

Concerned and curious about what had caused her death, I was present at her autopsy. This showed that she had widespread liver and abdominal cancer, the source of which was never clarified.

According to The New York Times, for Lawrence's funeral 5,000 people crowded the intersection of East 55th Street and Fifth Avenue in Manhattan, while 1,800 others, including Yul Brynner, Connecticut Governor John Davis Lodge, Marlene Dietrich, Phil Silvers, Luise Rainer, Moss Hart and his wife Kitty Carlisle, filled Fifth Avenue Presbyterian Church.

In his eulogy, Oscar Hammerstein II quoted from an essay on death written by poet and novelist Rabindranath Tagore. Lawrence was buried in the champagne-coloured gown designed by Irene Sharaff and worn for the "Shall We Dance?" number in the second act of The King and I, and she was interred in the Aldrich family plot in Lakeview Cemetery in Upton, Massachusetts. She was the first person for whom the lights were dimmed on all Broadway theatres during the immediate aftermath of a beloved performer’s death.

== Legacy ==
In early 1953, Lawrence's name was included on a list of Columbia University professors who had died the previous year and were honoured with a memorial service and flags on the campus lowered to half-staff.

Richard Aldrich's biography of his late wife became a best-seller in late 1954 and 1955, and was purchased by Marilyn Monroe at a New York bookstore.

Lawrence's biographer Sheridan Morley wrote in 1981 that throughout the 1950s, 1960s and 1970s, "most traces of Gertrude Lawrence ... disappeared; she died before television had begun to immortalise its artists on tape, before radio shows were regularly recorded, and though she made half a dozen films, her appearances in them are mostly undistinguished and give no clear impression of a radiance which could hold theatre audiences spellbound."

Julie Andrews portrayed Lawrence in the musical biographical film Star!, released to cinemas in 1968. Directed by Robert Wise, it was loosely based on the period of her life from her days as an unknown aspiring performer until her wedding to Richard Aldrich. Richard Crenna appeared as Aldrich. The real Aldrich, who in the 1960s no longer worked in the entertainment business, was a consultant on the film. Noël Coward was convincingly portrayed by Daniel Massey. Star! was a box-office failure.

The Glass Menagerie was Gertrude Lawrence's only film that was a box-office success and in which she worked with an American studio and an entirely American cast: Jane Wyman (Laura), Arthur Kennedy (Tom), Kirk Douglas (The Gentleman Caller). The director was Englishman Irving Rapper, whose entire career was in American cinema. The movie was rarely shown on American television until 1992, however. During that year, American Movie Classics revived it with an introduction and postscript from the channel's host, Bob Dorian. He provided information about Lawrence for American viewers who were not familiar with her.

Janet McTeer portrayed Lawrence opposite Geraldine Somerville as Daphne du Maurier and Malcolm Sinclair as Noël Coward in Daphne, a fictionalized television movie that was first broadcast by the BBC in 2007.

Three years after Lawrence's death, her daughter Pamela gave birth to Benn Clatworthy, by her second husband, the sculptor Robert Clatworthy. The first of Lawrence's three grandchildren, Benn was as of 2014 a tenor saxophonist based in Los Angeles. Lawrence's other two grandchildren, Sarah Hunt and Tom Clatworthy, are both residents of the United Kingdom.

== Selected theatre credits ==
- Some (West End, 1916)
- Cheep! (West End, 1917)
- A to Z (West End, 1921)
- London Calling! (West End, 1923)
- Andre Charlot's Revue of 1924 (Broadway, 1924)
- Charlot Revue (West End, 1925)
- Charlot's Revue of 1926 (Broadway and US tour, 1925–26)
- Oh, Kay! (Broadway, 1926; West End, 1927)
- Treasure Girl (Broadway, 1928)
- Candle Light (Broadway, 1929)
- The International Review (Broadway, 1930)
- Private Lives (West End, 1930; Broadway, 1931)
- Can the Leopard...? (West End, 1931)
- Behold, We Live (West End, 1932)
- Nymph Errant (West End, 1933)
- Tonight at 8.30 (UK tour, 1935; West End and Broadway, 1936; US tour, 1947; Broadway revival, 1948)
- Susan and God (Broadway, 1937; US tour, 1938)
- Skylark (US tour and Broadway, 1939)
- Lady in the Dark (Broadway, 1941)
- Errand for Bernice (US tour, 1944)
- Blithe Spirit (Hawaii, 1945)
- Pygmalion (Broadway, 1945; US tour, 1946)
- September Tide (UK tour and West End, 1948–49; Cape Cod, 1949)
- The King and I (Broadway, 1951)

== Filmography ==
Year	Title	Role	Notes
1929	The Battle of Paris	Georgie	
1932	Aren't We All?	Margot	
1932	Lord Camber's Ladies	Lady Camber	
1933	No Funny Business	Yvonne	
1935	Mimi	Mimi	
1936	Rembrandt	Geertje Dirx	
1936	Men Are Not Gods	Barbara Halford	
1943	Stage Door Canteen	Herself	Uncredited
1950	The Glass Menagerie	Amanda Wingfield	

== Discography ==
- A Bright Particular Star (Decca Records DL-74940)

== In popular culture ==
In the classic Moss Hart and George Kaufman play The Man Who Came to Dinner, the character Lorraine Sheldon was inspired by Gertrude Lawrence.

Lawrence's recording of the song "Getting to Know You" from The King and I was featured on the soundtrack of the sitcom The King of Queens in the episode "Arthur, Spooner." It was originally telecast in the United States on CBS on 23 September 2002 as the season premiere. It has been repeated many times in syndication, on TBS (US TV channel) in the United States and is available on the DVD for the Complete Fifth Season.
