= Teddie Gerard =

Argentine film actress and entertainer

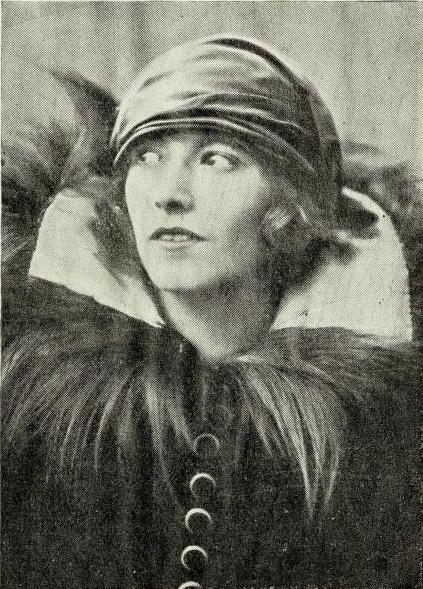
- Teddie Gerard in 1922
- Born: Teresa Cabre; May 2, 1890; Buenos Aires, Argentina
- Died: August 31, 1942 (aged 52); London, England, United Kingdom
- Occupation(s): Actress, Singer, Dancer
- Years active: 1909–1929
- Spouse: Joseph Raymond (m. 1908, divorced)

Teddie Gerard (born Teresa Cabre, May 2, 1890 – August 31, 1942) was an Argentine film actress and entertainer of the early 20th century.

== Career ==
Gerard first performed at the Casino Theatre on Broadway in New York City, in February 1909. She appeared in the chorus of Havana. Later she followed Gaby Deslys as the dancing partner of Harry Pilcer. Gerard was in a Flo Ziegfeld Midnight Frolic production on the New Amsterdam Roof in New York City, in August 1920. She was a singer and dancer in revues in London, England, and Paris, France, during the 1910s and 1920s. She performed in The Wedding Glide and Eclipse, written by E. Phillips Oppenheim. In 1921 Gerard was cast in the motion picture The Cave Girl. She acted in The Rat, a theatrical production taken from a work penned by David L'Estrange. The presentation was staged at the Colonial Theatre in London in 1925.

== Personal life ==
She wed Joseph Raymond, an American theatrical agent, in Newark, New Jersey, in 1908. She was engaged to actor Tom Douglas in 1926. In October 1928 Gerard announced her engagement to Captain Archie Grant of the Grenadier Guards, a son of the Scottish laird. The wedding was planned for a fortnight later, at Effingham, Surrey, where Gerard owned a cottage. However, in May 1929 the engagement was ended by mutual consent.

== Illness and death ==
Gerard became seriously ill with an infection of her right lung in March 1929. She was confined to a nursing home in the West End of London. She died following an extended illness in London in 1942. She was 52 years old.

== Partial filmography ==
- The Real Thing at Last (1916)
- The Cave Girl (1921)
- The Seventh Day (1922)
