= Gay Love =

1934 film

- Directed by: Leslie S. Hiscott
- Written by: Charles Bennett; Billie Bristow; John Paddy Carstairs; Audrey Carten (play); Waveney Carten (play)
- Produced by: Herbert Smith
- Starring: Florence Desmond; Sophie Tucker; Sydney Fairbrother
- Cinematography: Alex Bryce; Harry Rose
- Production company: British Lion
- Distributed by: British Lion
- Release date: 1 September 1934
- Running time: 77 minutes
- Country: United Kingdom
- Language: English

Gay Love is a 1934 British musical comedy film directed by Leslie S. Hiscott and starring Florence Desmond, Sophie Tucker and Sydney Fairbrother. It was written by Charles Bennett, Billie Bristow and John Paddy Carstairs based on the play of the same title by Audrey Carten and Waveney Carten. The film was made at Beaconsfield Studios in Buckinghamshire with sets designed by the art director Norman G. Arnold.

== Preservation status ==
The British Film Institute National Archive holds a collection of ephemera but no film or video materials.

== Plot ==
Gloria Fellowes is a talented revue star whose sister Marie is engaged to wealthy Lord Tony Eaton, but Marie's snobbery leads her to hide the fact that she has an entertainer in the family. When Tony and Gloria happen to meet, they fall in love, unaware of each other's true identity. The truth comes out following a crisis caused by Marie’s gambling debts, but Marie solves the problem by eloping with an old flame, clearing the way for Gloria and Tony to marry.

== Cast ==
- Florence Desmond as Gloria Fellowes
- Sophie Tucker as Sophie Tucker
- Sydney Fairbrother as Dukie
- Enid Stamp-Taylor as Marie Hopkins
- Ivor McLaren as Lord Tony Eaton
- Garry Marsh as Freddie Milton
- Leslie Perrins as Gerald Sparkes
- Ben Welden as Ben
- Finlay Currie as Highams

== Reception ==
Kine Weekly wrote: "Spirited romantic comedy with music, the story of which is effectively planned to exploit that brilliant mimic and versatile actress, Florence Desmond, and the inimitable cabaret entertainer, Sophie Tucker. The film is produced on a most lavish scale, and such is the soundness of the direction that balance is established and suitable background found for the dramatic interludes as well as the predominating gay comedy ones. The film represents capital musical entertainment."

The Daily Film Renter wrote: "Snappy musical show, dominated by compelling performance of Florence Desmond as stage star who falls in love with sister's fiancé, equally brilliant in impersonations and straight sequences. Full-blooded support from Sophie Tucker in characteristic songs, with Sydney Fairbrother well in running. Pleasant story, bright music, and effective settings."
