= Ernestine Barrier =

American actress (1908–1989)

- Born: March 19, 1908
- Died: February 13, 1989 (aged 80)
- Other name: Ernestine De Becker
- Occupation: Actress
- Spouse: Edgar Barrier
- Relatives: Marie De Becker (aunt)

Ernestine Barrier (née Spratt; March 19, 1908 – February 13, 1989) was an American actress of stage, film and television. She used the stage name of Ernestine De Becker (after her mother's maiden name). She is noted for playing a female president in the film Project Moonbase (1953). Descended from an acting family, Barrier made her first stage appearance at the age of roughly six months when she was carried onstage by her mother Ernestine ("Nesta") De Becker (sister of Marie De Becker), also an actress.

She is remembered for her work in the 1930s on Broadway where she appeared under the name Ernestine De Becker in Anton Chekhov's The Seagull, Jean Giraudoux's Amphitryon 38, Robert E. Sherwood's Idiot's Delight, Shakespeare's The Taming of the Shrew, and Late One Evening by Audrey Carten and Waveney Carten. In 1946, she returned to Broadway (using her married name of Ernestine Barrier) appearing in On Whitman Avenue.

Barrier acted into her eighties, appearing on such television shows as Charlie's Angels, CHiPs, and The Waltons and the television film A Family Upside Down (1978) with Helen Hayes and Fred Astaire. Her feature film appearances include Lust for Life (1956) with Kirk Douglas, and The Bottom of the Bottle (also 1956) with Van Johnson and Joseph Cotten.

== Selected television appearances ==
Year	Title	Role	Notes
1953	Death Valley Days	Eleanor Crosby	Season 1 Episode 11: "The Lady with the Blue Silk Umbrella"
1959	Alfred Hitchcock Presents	Mrs. Bedsole	Season 4 Episode 36: "Invitation to an Accident"
1959	Bat Masterson	Mrs. Dwight Chancellor	Season 2 Episode 1: "To the Manner Born"
