= Kenneth Carten =

English actor (1911–1980)

Kenneth Carten, Ross Landon, John Gatrell and Hugh French sing "The Stately Homes of England"

Kenneth Hare Bicker-Caarten (29 August 1911 – 1980) was an English actor who worked under the name Kenneth Carten.

== Biography ==
Kenneth Hare Bicker-Caarten was born on 29 August 1911 at Blomfield Road, Maida Vale, London, the son of middle-class parents Catherine and Edwin Hare Bicker-Caarten. His sisters were playwrights Waveney Carten and Audrey Carten.

Tallulah Bankhead, a very close friend of his sister, Audrey, became a surrogate mother to Carten, who during the summer break from Eton College, went to live with them.

In the late 1930s, with his sister, Audrey, he frequented the social circle of Elvira Mullens Barney.

== Appearances ==
- 1930: Charlot's Masquerade with Beatrice Lillie
- 1930: Wonder Bar with Gwen Farrar and Norah Blaney.
- 1933: Gay Love by Waveney Carten and Audrey Carten, with Gwen Farrar
- 1933: Please with Beatrice Lillie.
- 1934: Streamline with Tilly Losch.
- 1935: Roulette
- 1935: Full House by Ivor Novello.
- 1936: as Edward Valance in Family Album, written and starred by Noël Coward
- 1936: as Alf in Red Peppers, written and starred by Noël Coward
- 1936: as Gaston in Ways and Means, written and starred by Noël Coward
- 1936: as Stanley in Still life, written and starred by Noël Coward
- 1936: Tonight at 8:30, written and starred by Noël Coward
- 1937: Foodlight written by Beverley Nichols, with Cyril Butcher and Hermione Baddeley.
- 1939: Operette (musical)|Operette (later he recorded the song The Stately Homes of England).
- 1939: French without Tears by Terence Rattigan.
- 1942: as Sub-Lieutenant R.N.V.R. in the war-movie In Which We Serve directed by Noël Coward and David Lean.

After leaving acting, he became a theatrical agent; his clients included Laurence Olivier, Noël Coward and Googie Withers. He discovered and represented Peter Sallis. He worked for the Myron Selznick corporation. He represented also Amelia Hall, who, in her memoirs, wrote: "I returned to my Hampstead digs and phoned Kenneth Carten. "Mr Carten, I cannot take part in the murder of a masterpiece." In his quiet, English way Kenneth Carten reasoned with me. He asked me to realize that not every day did an actress come to England from abroad and within two or three weeks land a role like Amanda. He begged me to put up with the script. I did. Looking back, I marvel that I was allowed to work, for I did not belong to British Equity, nor to any union."

He died in Kensington in 1980.
