= The Last Hour =

The Last Hour may refer to:

- The Last Hour (1921 film), a German silent film
- The Last Hour (1923 film), an American silent crime film directed by Edward Sloman
- The Last Hour (1930 film), a British comedy crime film
- The Last Hour (1991 film), an American action film
- The Last Hour (2017 film), a Peruvian thriller drama film by Eduardo Mendoza de Echave
- The Last Hour (play), a 1928 play by Charles Bennett, basis for the 1930 film
- The Last Hour (TV series), a 2021 Indian supernatural crime thriller series
- DLASTHR (The Last Hour), an Assyrian criminal organization in suburban Sydney, Australia

== See also ==
- Last Hour, a 2008 American crime drama film
