= Handy Foundation =

- Formation: 2020; 6 years ago
- Type: Nonprofit
- Headquarters: Pasadena, California
- Board Chair: Ri-Karlo Handy
- Website: www.handyfoundation.com

The Handy Foundation is a nonprofit organization which provides training and career advancement opportunities to underrepresented individuals in the film industry. The organization was founded by chairman Ri-Karlo Handy in 2020.

== Overview ==
The Handy Foundation holds workshops and apprenticeship programs to train young people for roles in the film industry, particularly technical aspects of production such as film editing. The foundation partners with studios and production companies for its career advancement programs. As of 2022, these partners included Netflix, ITV, Fremantle, 44 Blue, Critical Content, Warner Horizon Scripted Television, Bunim/Murray Productions and Tinopolis. The Handy Foundation also partners with local and national organizations to provide training and education, such as the Urban League of Los Angeles, the NAACP, Television Academy Foundation, Los Angeles City College, Mount Sac College, and California State University, Northridge. In 2023, the foundation established a partnership with NBCUniversal.

== History ==
On July 2, 2020 it was announced that the organization was partnering with the Motion Picture Editors Guild and the Los Angeles Urban League to promote diversity in the film industry.

The foundation partnered with City of Los Angeles Economic and Workforce Development Department in 2021 for the Hollywood Bridge Youth Program, which works with young adults in television production.

In 2022, the foundation launched the Pilot Career Pathways Training Program with support from the California Film Commission. That year, the foundation piloted a training program for editors and production assistants with Netflix, which was formally launched in 2023. On January 14, 2023, the organization helped launch the NAACP's Glam Squad program.
