= Charles Bennett (screenwriter) =

English screenwriter (1899–1995)

- Born: 2 August 1899; Shoreham-by-Sea, Sussex, United Kingdom
- Died: 15 June 1995 (aged 95); Los Angeles, California, United States
- Occupations: Screenwriter, playwright, actor, director
- Years active: 1911–1990
- Spouses: Faith Bennett (m. 1930; div. 1941); Betty Jo Riley (m. 1947; died 1984)
- Children: 1

Charles Alfred Selwyn Bennett (2 August 1899 – 15 June 1995) was an English playwright, screenwriter, actor and director probably best known for his work with Alfred Hitchcock. He was nominated for the first Academy Award for Best Original Screenplay for Foreign Correspondent.

== Biography ==
=== Early life ===
Charles Bennett was born in a disused railway carriage in Shoreham-by-Sea, Sussex, England, the son of Lilian Langrishe Bennett (1863–1930), an actress and artist. Bennett's mother told him his father was Charles Bennett, a civil engineer killed in a boiler explosion, though he thought it was actor Kyrle Bellew (1855–1911). Bennett had an elder brother, Frederick (known as Eric), and a younger brother, Vere. His father is recorded in his baptismal register as Frederick Bennett, engineer. The film historian John Belton has asserted that Bennett's father died when he was four. In the 1911 census, Lilian Bennett recorded herself as a widow, and an artist.

Bennett was mostly educated at home, but also briefly at St Mark's College, Chelsea.

=== Actor ===
Bennett was a child actor, appearing in Max Reinhart's production of The Miracle at Olympia Theatre in 1911. He played child roles in stage productions of Alice in Wonderland (1913), Goody Two Shoes (1913), Drake (1914) and The Marriage Market (1915), and toured in productions all over England.

He had a role in the film John Halifax, Gentleman (1915) as the young John Halifax; the older Halifax was Fred Paul. The performance was not particularly well received and Bennett became an extra and assistant to Adrian Brunel. He continued to appear in stage in productions of The Speckled Band (1916), King Lear (1916) with Sir Herbert Tree and Raffles (1917).

In 1917 he enlisted in the army and served with the Royal Fusiliers. Most of his war service was spent on the Somme, where he saw action. He was awarded the Military Medal and ended the war with the rank of lieutenant. He was invalided out due to a gas attack and left the army in 1919.

Bennett resumed his acting career, playing with the Brewster's Millions company (1920), then the Compton Comedy Company, the Lena Ashwell Players, the Gertrude Elliott Touring Company, and the Henry Baynton Company (for whom he appeared in Antony and Cleopatra and A Midsummer Night's Dream).In 1923 he joined the Alexander Marsh Shakespearean company, touring throughout England. He later said "At first I was a terrible actor. I used to get jobs and be fired from them; but gradually I learned to act."

=== Playwright ===
In 1925 Bennett joined the Ben Greet Repertory, which performed in Paris from 1925 to 1926. During this time, while acting in the evenings he wrote his first three full-length plays: The Return, based on his war service, Blackmail and The Last Hour.

In December 1926 Bennett played Theseus in a production of A Midsummer Night's Dream at London's Winter Garden Theatre. In April 1927 he was in a production of Othello at the Apollo Theatre alongside John Gielgud, Robert Loraine and Gertrude Elliott.

In May 1927 Bennett appeared in a production of his own play The Return, which he also directed. Peggy Ashcroft was in the cast. Bennett said "it got wonderful reviews but never made any money." In December 1927 he appeared in Loraine's production of Cyrano de Bergerac.

Bennett had the biggest success of his career to date when Al Woods decided to finance a production of Blackmail in 1928, produced by Raymond Massey and starring Tallulah Bankhead. The play was not well received at first, but had a hugely successful run on tour. The play was seen by Alfred Hitchcock who arranged for British International Pictures to buy the film rights and adapted Bennett's play into a script, with Benn Levy doing the dialogue. His film of Blackmail (1929) is generally credited as the first British sound film, and was a huge commercial success.

Bennett's play The Last Hour debuted on London stage in December 1928 and was a popular hit in London. The Last Hour (1930) was turned into a movie directed by Walter Forde, the first "talkie" for Nettleford Studios.

Bennett's fourth play was The Danger Line (1929), based on Hazel May Marshall's story Ten Minutes to Twelve. He also wrote a one act play After Midnight (1929). Bennett later said "In 1929 I was making an immense amount of money, and I was happy. I had six plays touring the country. Then, talkies were really beginning to hit, and the theatres were beginning to go to hell."

=== Early screenplays ===
The success of Blackmail led to British International offering him a contract in September 1931 to deliver three film stories a year for two years. He was reunited with Alfred Hitchcock and they collaborated on a story for Bulldog Drummond, to be called Bulldog Drummond's Baby. However Hitchcock then directed some films which flopped and BIP chose not to proceed with the project.

While at BIP he wrote stories for as yet filmed books: Death on the Footplate, The Parrot Whistles, High Speed, Love My Dog and Fireman Save My Child.

Bennett provided the story for a number of low-budget movies for George King who he later called the "world's worst director": Number, Please (1931); Deadlock (1931), which was a big hit; Midnight (1931), the latter based on his play; and Two Way Street (1932).

Bennett wrote and directed the play Sensation (1931), a melodrama, but it was not a success, although it was adapted into a film.

He followed it with another play Big Business (1932), which Bennett also directed and appeared in alongside his then-wife Maggie. But by now he had given up acting to focus on writing.

Bennett wrote a short film, Partners Please (1932), and did an early film for John Paddy Carstairs, Paris Plane (1933).

Bennett wrote Mannequin (1933); The House of Trent (1933); Matinee Idol (1933) for King; Hawley's of High Street (1933), a rare comedy for Bennett; The Secret of the Loch (1934), the first film shot on location in Scotland; Warn London (1934); an adaptation of his play Big Business (1934); and Gay Love (1934). A number of these films were written in collaboration with publicist and story writer Billie Bristow; she and Bennett would work on eight films together in all. Bennett said " I wrote about ten movies during that period, I suppose. I’d write the damned things in a month or less and be paid about 300 pounds for them, which wasn’t bad in those days."

In 1934 he wrote the play Heart's Desire which he later regarded as the best play he wrote and the only one he loved but it was never produced.

=== Hitchcock ===
Hitchcock moved over to Gaumont British where he got Michael Balcon interested in Bulldog Drummond's Baby. It was eventually filmed as The Man Who Knew Too Much (1934), which was a significant success.

After doing Night Mail (1935) with Bristow, Bennett wrote The 39 Steps (1935) for Hitchcock, a film which soon established itself as a classic; Bennett said he was responsible for most of the film's construction, but paid tribute to the contribution of Ian Hay, who did dialogue. "Possibly, I suppose, I was the best-known constructionist in the world at that time," he said. "I’m not being conceited, but I was awfully bloody good. I was a first-class constructionist. I’m not saying I was the best dialogue writer in the world."

Bennett was now in much demand. He wrote The Clairvoyant (1935) with Claude Rains and Fay Wray; King of the Damned (1935), written with Sidney Gilliat; All at Sea (1936); Blue Smoke (1935).

He did two films for Hitchcock, Secret Agent (1936) (based on Somerset Maugham's Ashenden) and Sabotage (1936).

In January 1936 his play Page From a Diary, starring Greer Garson and Ernst Deutsch, had a short run at the Garrick Theatre in London.

Bennett was one of several writers on King Solomon's Mines (1937) although he later said "Somehow or other, I got a credit on it, which I don’t think I probably deserved." He went back to Hitchcock for Young and Innocent (1937). Bennett enjoyed working at Gaumont British "a very pleasant - I've never known anywhere as pleasant to work as was Gaumont-British."

=== Hollywood ===
Bennett's work with Hitchcock had made him perhaps the most highly regarded screenwriter in England (one paper called him "Britain's best known blood curdler") and attracted the attention of Hollywood. In 1937 he accepted a contract with Universal Studios at $1,500 a week.

Bennett recalled, "When I came over here, I was a complete flop, by the way. They immediately decided they couldn’t afford to use me and they loaned me out at a profit—which irritated me immensely—to Goldwyn. " For Goldwyn he did some uncredited writing on The Adventures of Marco Polo (1938) and The Real Glory (1939), then worked on Universal's Good Girls Go to Paris (1939) and Hidden Power (1939). After six months Universal dropped Bennett's contract. His agent Myron Selznick got Bennett a job with Myron's brother David. Bennett got his first Hollywood credited on the comedy The Young in Heart (1938); he did the construction and Paul Osborne the dialogue.

Bennett then signed a contract to MGM where he worked on Cause for Alarm, an adaptation of an Eric Ambler novel which ended up not being made, and Balalaika (1939), a Nelson Eddy musical. He wrote a short novel, War in His Pocket, which was published in 1939.

Hitchcock moved to the US and hired Bennett to do some work on Foreign Correspondent (1940). Bennett and co-writer Joan Harrison were nominated for the first Academy Award for Best Original Screenplay at the 13th Academy Awards.

=== Cecil B. De Mille ===
Bennett worked on They Dare Not Love (1941) at Columbia and did uncredited work on Lucky Legs (1942). He was hired by Cecil B. De Mille to work on the script construction of Reap the Wild Wind (1942), which was a huge hit.

Bennett went to RKO to write Joan of Paris (1942), which he later said "It’s my favorite picture of all the pictures ’ve ever been connected with. Because it was more human, more in touch with my hatred of Germany, with my love of my country and my feeling for France." At that studio he wrote the unproduced Challenge to the Night and was one of many writers on Forever and a Day (1943). He also made some uncredited contributions to the script of Saboteur (1942).

During war he claims to have done undercover work for Allied intelligence, including spying on Russia.

De Mille used Bennett again on The Story of Dr. Wassell (1944), once more focusing on construction while Alan Le May did the dialogue. Another script Bennett did for De Mulle, Rurales, about the Mexican Revolution, was never made.

In 1944 Bennett returned to London to write propaganda films for the British Ministry of Information. He continued to write feature films as well, earning $15,000 from Edward Small for an early draft of Lorna Doone, and an adaptation of the Madeleine Smith story for Two Cities Films to star Vivien Leigh and Laurence Olivier, at a fee of £4,000. He was contracted to direct the latter. Two Cities contracted Bennett to write Miracle of Peille.

After the war, Bennett returned to Hollywood and wrote Unconquered (1947) for De Mille. Olivier and Leigh pulled out of the Madeleine Smith project, so Bennett went to Universal to work on Ivy (1947), a thriller for Sam Wood and Joan Fontaine. Bennett liked the movie but felt "it wasn’t very successful. I think Sam Wood didn’t do a very good job on it. "

=== Director ===
Bennett was going to direct Laraine Day in The Trial of Madeleine Smith but those plans were interrupted when David Lean decided to make Madeleine.

Instead he worked on the scripts for The Sign of the Ram (1948) for John Sturges and Black Magic (1948) for Edward Small. Bennett called the latter "a helluva good script ruined by Orson Welles and Gregory Ratoff, who were given their complete freedom to do so. Eddie Small, who was backing the picture, was afraid to cross the Atlantic by air." Bennett attempted to remake Blackmail but was unsuccessful.

Bennett finally made his directorial debut in Madness of the Heart (1949) with Margaret Lockwood.

He continued to write: the unproduced Bangkok for Robert G. North, The Search for the Holy Grail for De Mille and a film for Rank, The Moneyman.

He was credited on the script for Where Danger Lives (1950), where he worked with Irwin Allen for the first time. He also write Kind Lady (1951), and The Green Glove (1952), then got another chance to direct with No Escape (1953), a film noir.

Bennett worked on the script for Dangerous Mission (1954) where he worked with Allen again.

=== Television ===
Bennett began writing for TV, doing such shows as The Ford Television Theatre, Climax! (where he did "Casino Royale", the first screen adaptation of a James Bond novel, Schlitz Playhouse, Fireside Theatre, Cavalcade of America, The Count of Monte Cristo, Conflict, The Christophers, Lux Video Theatre and The New Adventures of Charlie Chan. Some of these he also directed and he produced Charlie Chan.

=== Irwin Allen ===
Bennett was reunited with Allen on The Story of Mankind (1957) which he said was "dreadful. Because Irwin desperately wanted to have the first credit on the story, so everything I wrote he wanted to cut out. (Laughs.) I hated everything to do with that picture." Bennett wrote Night of the Demon (1957) in England, which he had hoped to direct himself; it became a cult success. Bennett later said "Hal Chester, messed up the screenplay quite a bit. It was so good, the screenplay, that it couldn’t be completely destroyed, only half destroyed. It’s still considered a good movie."

He then did a series of films for Allen: The Big Circus (1959), The Lost World (1960), Voyage to the Bottom of the Sea (1961), and Five Weeks in a Balloon (1962).

Bennett also wrote for The Dick Powell Show and did War-Gods of the Deep (1965) for AIP.

In the late 1960s Bennett focused on TV series such as The Wild Wild West, and Voyage to the Bottom of the Sea and Land of the Giants for Allen. Bennett disliked his credits for Allen. "They were all jobs that I did well, let’s put it that way. Let’s not think in terms of something that I will carry down to my grave as things that I am proud of."

=== Later career ===
Bennett had no produced credits from the 1970s onwards. "It was so frustrating, because in many ways I felt my writing had gotten even better", he said. "But at my age, no one wanted to hire me... know, I hate all the talk of this being a young man's industry. I hate it! Not because I'm an old man. But because I hate the notion that you must be young to be hot."

Bennett continued to write films, plays, treatments and TV series, though none were produced. He wrote a novel, Fox on the Run which was published in 1987.

In 1990 Bennett was hired to write a remake of Blackmail. The film was never made.

Bennett appeared on the game show "Tic Tac Dough" in 1980 in an over 80's tournament. Wink Martindale (host) interviewed Bennett before and after his match.

== Personal life ==
Bennett's brother Eric was killed in World War I in 1915. His other brother, Vere, hanged himself in 1928.

He was twice married. First, in 1930, to the actress Faith Bennett. They were divorced in 1941, and in 1947 Bennett married Betty Jo Riley, who predeceased him. They had a son, John Charles Bennett.

Bennett died in Los Angeles in 1995.

== Biographies ==
Bennett has been the subject of two biographies, both written by his son John.

- Hitchcock's Partner in Suspense (2014)
- The Rise of the Modern Thriller (2020)

He has also been the subject of biographical articles:

- Barr, Charles. "Blackmail: Charles Bennett and the Decisive Turn" in Palmer, R Burton & Boyd, David, Hitchcock at the Source: The Auteur as Adaptor, 2011, New York: SUNY Press.
- Belton, John. "Charles Bennett and the typical Hitchcock scenario", Film History, (1997) 9(3), 320–332.

He was interviewed by Arnold Schwartzman for the British Entertainment History Project in 1992.

== Selected filmography ==
- John Halifax, Gentleman (1915) – actor only
- Blackmail (1929) – based on his play
- The Last Hour (1930) – based on his play
- Two Way Street (1931)
- Deadlock (1931)
- Midnight (1931) – based on his play
- Number, Please (1931)
- Partners Please (1932)
- Mannequin (1933)
- Paris Plane (1933)
- Hawley's of High Street (1933)
- The House of Trent (1933)
- Matinee Idol (1933)
- The Secret of the Loch (1934)
- Gay Love (1934)
- Warn London (1934)
- The Man Who Knew Too Much (1934) (story)
- Night Mail (1935)
- Blue Smoke (1935)
- The Clairvoyant (1935)
- King of the Damned (1935)
- The 39 Steps (1935)
- Sabotage (1936)
- Secret Agent (1936)
- All at Sea (1936)
- King Solomons's Mines (1937)
- Young and Innocent (1937)
- The Adventures of Marco Polo (1938)
- The Young in Heart (1938)
- Hidden Power (1939) – uncredited contribution
- Balalaika (1939)
- Foreign Correspondent (1940)
- They Dare Not Love (1941)
- Reap the Wild Wind (1942)
- Saboteur (1942)
- Joan of Paris (1942)
- Forever and a Day (1943)
- The Story of Dr. Wassell (1944)
- Unconquered (1947)
- Ivy (1947)
- The Sign of the Ram (1948)
- Madness of the Heart (1949) (also directed)
- Black Magic (1949)
- Where Danger Lives (1950)
- Kind Lady (1951)
- The Green Glove (1952)
- Ford Television Theatre (1952) (TV series)
- No Escape (1953) (also directed)
- Dangerous Mission (1954)
- Climax! (1954–55) (TV series) – various eps including Casino Royale
- Fireside Theatre (1954–55) (TV series) – 7 eps
- Schlitz Playhouse (1954–55) (TV series) (also directed)
- The Christophers (1955–57) (TV series) (also directed)
- Cavalcade of America (1955) (TV series) (also directed)
- Conflict (1956) (TV series) – 2 eps
- The Count of Monte Cristo (1956) (TV series) (also directed)
- The Man Who Knew Too Much (1956) – original story
- Lux Video Theatre (1955–57) (TV series) – 4 eps
- The Story of Mankind (1957)
- Night of the Demon (1957)
- The New Adventures of Charlie Chan (1957–58) (TV series) (also directed)
- Behind Closed Doors (1958) (TV series) – 1 ep
- The Big Circus (1959)
- The Lost World (1960)
- Voyage to the Bottom of the Sea (1961)
- The Dick Powell Theatre (1962) (TV series)
- Five Weeks in a Balloon (1962)
- The City Under the Sea (1965)
- The Wild Wild West (1966) (TV series) – 1 ep
- Voyage to the Bottom of the Sea (1967–68) (TV series) – 7 eps
- Land of the Giants (1968) (TV series) – 1 ep

== Plays ==
- The Return (1925)
- Blackmail (1928)
- The Last Hour (1928)
- Sensation (1931)
- Big Business
- Midnight
- The Danger Line
- Page From a Diary (1936)

== Notes ==
- McGilligan, Patrick (1986). "Charles Bennett: first class constructionist". Backstory: Interviews with Screenwriters of Hollywood's Golden Age. University of California Press. pp. 17–48.
