= Two Way Street =

Two Way Street may refer to:

- Two-way street
- Two Way Street (film), a 1930 British drama film
- "Two Way Street" (song), by Kimbra, 2012

== See also ==
- It takes two to tango, a common idiomatic expression
