= Estelle Winwood =

British actress (1883–1984)

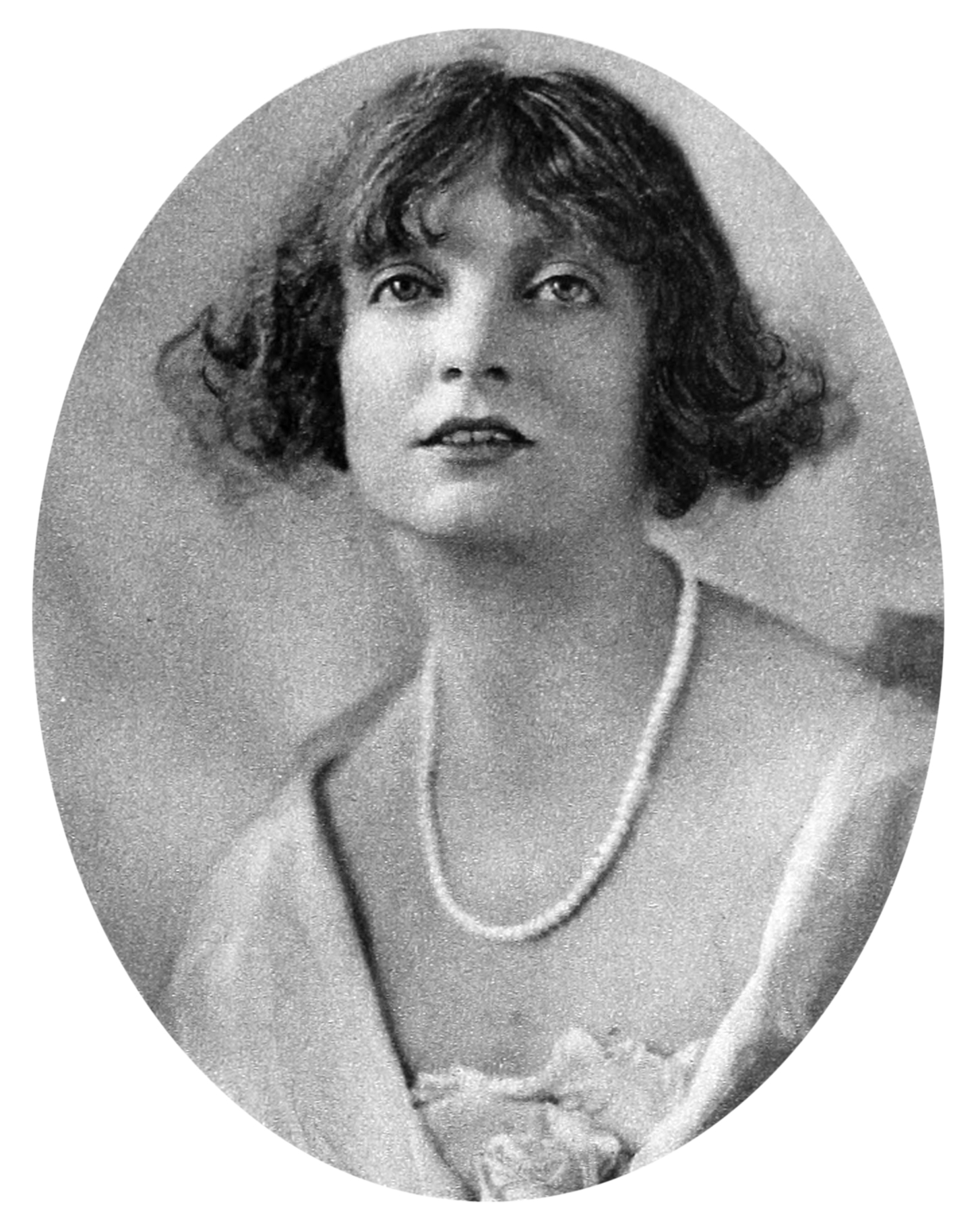
- Winwood in 1920
- Born: Estelle Ruth Goodwin; 24 January 1883; Lee, Kent, England
- Died: 20 June 1984 (aged 101); Woodland Hills, California, U.S.
- Occupation: Actress
- Years active: 1903–1983
- Spouse(s): Arthur Chesney (m. 1907; div. 1928) Francis Barlow Bradley (m. 1928; died 1929) Robert Barton Henderson (m. 1944)

Estelle Winwood (born Estelle Ruth Goodwin, 24 January 1883 – 20 June 1984) was an English actress who moved to the United States mid-career and became celebrated for her wit and longevity, starring in film and TV roles until her nineties.

== Early life and early career ==
Born Estelle Ruth Goodwin in 1883 in Lee, Hundred of Blackheath, Kent, she decided at the age of five that she wanted to be an actress. With her mother's support, but her father's disapproval, she trained with the Lyric Stage Academy in London, before making her professional debut in Johannesburg at the age of 20. During the First World War, she joined the Liverpool Repertory Company before moving on to a career in London's West End.

== Broadway and West End career ==
She moved to the U.S. in 1916 and made her Broadway début in New York City. Until the beginning of the 1930s, she divided her time between New York City and London. Throughout her career, her first love was the theater; and, as the years passed, she appeared less frequently in London and became a frequent performer on Broadway, appearing in such plays as A Successful Calamity (1917), A Little Journey (1918), Spring Cleaning (1923), The Distaff Side (1934), The Importance of Being Earnest (which she also directed, 1939), When We Are Married (1939), Ladies in Retirement (1940), The Pirate (1942), Ten Little Indians (1944), Lady Windermere's Fan (1947), and The Madwoman of Chaillot (1948).

== Film and television ==
Like many stage actors of her era, Winwood expressed a distaste for films and resisted the offers she received during the 1920s. She relented and made her film début in Night Angel (1931), but her scenes were cut before the film's release. Her official film début came in The House of Trent (1933), and Quality Street (1937) was her first role of note. She made no cinematic films during the 1940s, but expressed a willingness to participate in the new medium of television, starring in a television production of Blithe Spirit in 1946. During the 1950s, she appeared more frequently in television than she did in film in such series as Robert Montgomery Presents, Alfred Hitchcock Presents, and The Donna Reed Show. She played the character Hortense in the episode "Where's There's a Will" on the ABC sitcom The Real McCoys starring Walter Brennan. Her few films from that period include The Glass Slipper (1955), The Swan (1956), and 23 Paces to Baker Street (1956).

Her other film credits include Darby O'Gill and the Little People (1959), The Misfits (1961), The Magic Sword (1962), The Notorious Landlady (1962), Dead Ringer (1964), Camelot (1967) and The Producers (1967). She later denigrated the last film, saying she could not imagine why she had done it except for the money.

Her other work for television included guest roles in Dennis the Menace, The Twilight Zone as the elderly wife of the ageless title character in "Long Live Walter Jameson", Thriller, Dr. Kildare, The Man from U.N.C.L.E., The Name of the Game, Bewitched, Batman, Love, American Style, Cannon, Police Story, The F.B.I., and the last episode of Perry Mason, titled "The Case of the Final Fade-Out", in which she played an aging actress who ended up as a second defendant. Winwood also appeared in the Barnaby Jones episode "Murder in the Doll's House".

Winwood's final film appearance, at age 92 in Murder by Death (1976), was as an ancient nursemaid to Jessica Marbles (a spoof of Miss Marple, played by Elsa Lanchester). In this film, she joined other veteran actors spoofing some of the most popular detective characters in murder mysteries on film and television (including Nick and Nora Charles and Hercule Poirot). When she took on her final major television role in a 1979 episode of Quincy, M.E., she officially became, at age 96, the oldest actor working in the U.S., narrowly beating fellow British actress Ethel Griffies. She continued making appearances until she was 100 years old.

== Personal life and death ==
Winwood married four times (Merv Griffin interview 1979): to character actor Arthur Chesney in 1907, New Zealand rancher and marine solicitor Francis Barlow Bradley in 1928 (He died in 1929), third marriage - dates needed, American actor Robert Henderson in 1944, a man many years her junior, from whom Winwood lived apart in her later life, though he would visit her several times a year. Winwood did not have children.

Winwood was good friends with Tallulah Bankhead, who died in 1968. Bankhead, actresses Eva Le Gallienne and Blyth Daly, and Winwood were dubbed "The Four Riders of the Algonquin" in the early silent film days, because of their appearances together at the Algonquin Round Table. Winwood appeared as a character in Answered Prayers, Truman Capote's final, unfinished, thinly veiled roman à clef. In the novel, which uses her real name, she attends a drunken dinner party with Bankhead, Dorothy Parker, Montgomery Clift, and the novel's narrator, P. B. Jones.

In a 1979 interview, at age 95, Winwood remarked that she smoked three packs of cigarettes a day. On her 100th birthday, Winwood was asked how it felt to have lived so long; she replied "How rude of you to remind me!" Bette Davis, a co-star from Dead Ringer, was photographed at Winwood's side on the occasion in Hollywood, California.

Winwood died in her sleep in Woodland Hills, California, in 1984 at age 101. She was interred in the Westwood Village Memorial Park Cemetery.

== Select filmography ==
Year	Title	Role	Notes
1931	The Night Angel		(scenes deleted)
1933	The House of Trent	Charlotte	
1937	Quality Street	Mary Willoughby	
1946	Blithe Spirit	Madame Arcati	TV movie
1955	The Glass Slipper	Mrs. Denise Toquet	
1956	The Swan	Symphorosa	
1956	23 Paces to Baker Street	Barmaid at The Eagle	
1956	Alfred Hitchcock Presents	Monica Laughton	Season 1 Episode 25: "There Was an Old Woman"
1958	This Happy Feeling	Mrs. Julie Early	
1958	Alfred Hitchcock Presents	Miss Hildy-Lou	Season 3 Episode 26: "Bull in a China Shop"
1959	Darby O'Gill and the Little People	Sheelah Sugrue	
1959	Alive and Kicking	Mabel	
1961	The Misfits	Church Lady Collecting Money in Bar	
1962	The Magic Sword	Sybil	
1962	The Notorious Landlady	Mrs. Dawn Dunhill	
1962	The Cabinet of Caligari	Ruth	
1964	Dead Ringer	Dona Anna	
1967	Camelot	Lady Clarinda	
1967	Games	Miss Lou-Betty Beattie	
1967	The Producers	"Hold Me! Touch Me!"	
1970	Jenny		
1971	Decisions! Decisions!		TV movie
1976	Murder by Death	Miss Withers	
