= The Interviews: An Oral History of Television =

Archive of video interviews relating to American television

The Interviews: An Oral History of Television (formerly titled the Archive of American Television) is a project of the nonprofit Academy of Television Arts & Sciences Foundation in North Hollywood, Los Angeles, that records interviews with notable people from all aspects of the television industry.

The project has interviewed over 950 television pioneers and has posted over 900 videotaped interviews online. It is their ultimate goal to be the world's largest and most advanced oral history collection on the history of television and make these primary resources freely available and searchable to the public. The archive's subjects include all professions within the television industry that are recognized by the Emmy Awards. Examples include: actors Tony Randall, Fess Parker, William Shatner, Betty White, Alan Alda, James Garner, Mary Tyler Moore, Dick Van Dyke, Ossie Davis, Carol Burnett and Michael J. Fox; and producers Norman Lear, Carl Reiner, Chris Carter, Steven Bochco, Philip Rosenthal, Chuck Barris, Sherwood Schwartz, Fred Rogers and Dick Wolf; newscasters Walter Cronkite, Ed Bradley, Bob Schieffer and David Brinkley; executives Fred Silverman, Sumner Redstone, Leslie Moonves, Robert Johnson, Kay Koplovitz, Frank Stanton and Ted Turner; costume designers Bob Mackie and Nolan Miller; choreographers Tony Charmoli and Cyd Charisse; writers Roy Huggins, Tad Mosel, Sidney Sheldon, Abby Mann and Ann Marcus, among numerous others.

== History ==
Motivated by Steven Spielberg's Survivors of the Shoah Visual History Foundation, which has videotaped testimonies of Holocaust survivors, Dean Valentine (former Disney Television and UPN president) was inspired to create a similar project for television. Valentine developed and presented a proposal to the TV Academy, under then-president Richard H. Frank and Academy Foundation Chairman Thomas W. Sarnoff. NBC executive Grant Tinker, Award-winning producer David L. Wolper are the Archive's founding co-chairs. The creation of the Archive of American Television was co-founded and executive produced by Michael Rosen and overseen by James Loper, the Executive Director of the Academy of Television Arts & Sciences from 1984 until 1999.

Beginning in early 1996, the Archive of American Television completed its first six interviews as part of its pilot stage. The initial six interviews were with Elma Farnsworth, widow and lab assistant to the inventor of electronic television Philo Farnsworth; Leonard Goldenson, founder of ABC, Dick Smith, television's first make-up artist; Ethel Winant, casting executive; Sheldon Leonard, show creator, actor, and director; and comedian Milton Berle. The Academy of Television Arts and Sciences Foundation officially launched the Archive of American Television in 1997 under the day-to-day leadership of Rosen and Sarnoff. Subsequent directors of the Archive include Karen L. Herman and Jenni Matz.

Thousands of hours of historic interviews have been completed with over 950 TV legends. In 2009, a fully searchable website was launched to make the collection available the public emmytvlegends.org. Long-form, multi-hour video interviews currently online include actors, Richard Crenna, Barbara Eden, Jonathan Winters, Dick Clark, Florence Henderson, Andy Griffith, Bob Newhart, and Mickey Rooney, writer and producers, writer Harlan Ellison, news legends Walter Cronkite, Robert MacNeil, Jim McKay, Mike Wallace and David Brinkley, and executives Fred Silverman, Leonard Goldenson and Ted Turner. Key players from the 1950s quiz show scandals were also interviewed: Herb Stempel and Albert Freedman.

Television Academy Foundation staff, professors, scholars and journalists from around the country volunteer their time to select candidates for, and conduct these interviews. The Foundation employs a small staff who prepare all of the research and questions in advance. Local video crews record each interview.

== See also ==
- British Entertainment History Project
