= Sensation (play) =

1931 thriller play

- Written by: Charles Bennett
- Original language: English
- Genre: Thriller

Premiere
- Date premiered: 15 October 1931
- Place premiered: Lyceum Theatre, London

Sensation is a 1931 thriller play by the British writer Charles Bennett.

It ran for 59 performances at the Lyceum Theatre in London's West End. The cast included Eve Gray, Sam Livesey, Roger Livesey, Henry Cass and Edgar Norfolk.

== Bibliography ==
- Wearing, J.P. The London Stage 1930-1939: A Calendar of Productions, Performers, and Personnel. Rowman & Littlefield, 2014.
