= The Last Hour (play) =

1928 play

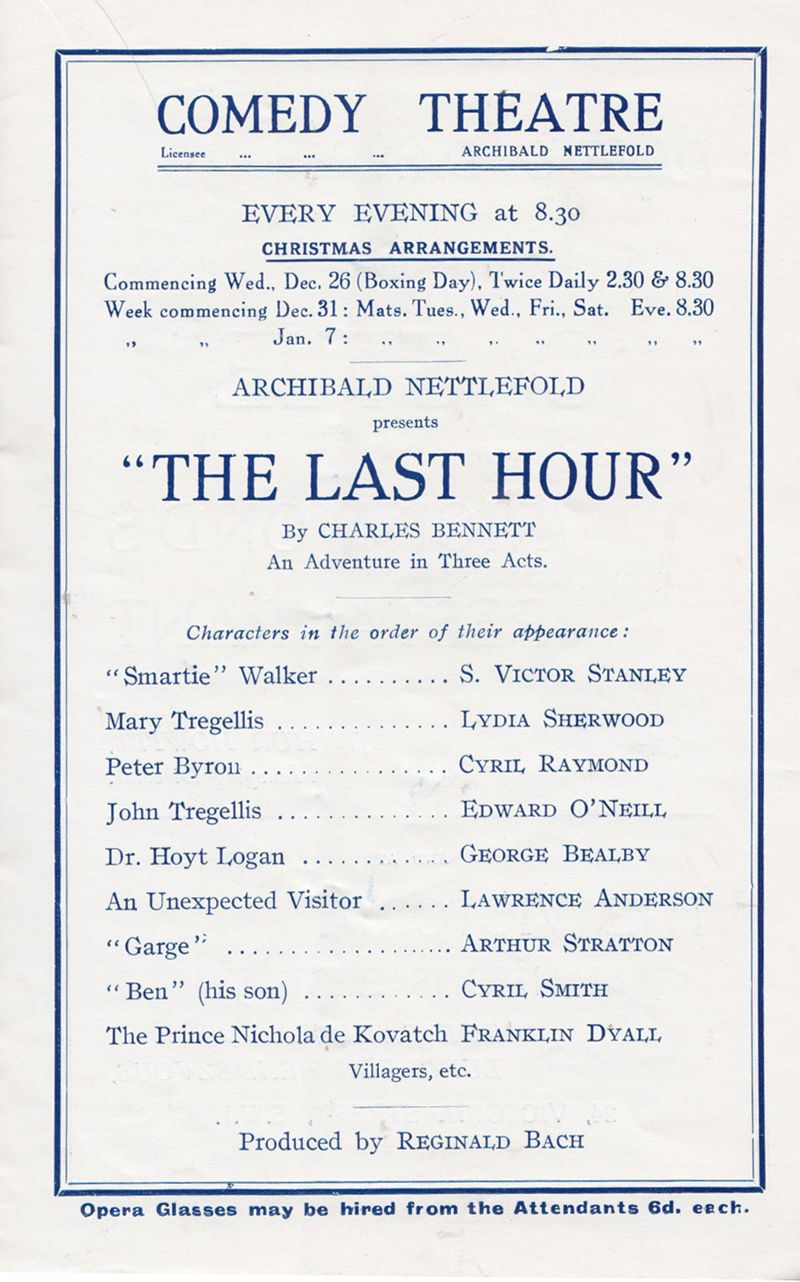
- Original language: English
- Written by: Charles Bennett
- Genre: Thriller

Premiere
- Date: 20 December 1928
- Place: Comedy Theatre, London

The Last Hour is a 1928 comedy thriller play by the British writer Charles Bennett. At an inn on the coast of Devon, a secret agent battles a foreign prince trying to smuggle a stolen death ray out of the country.

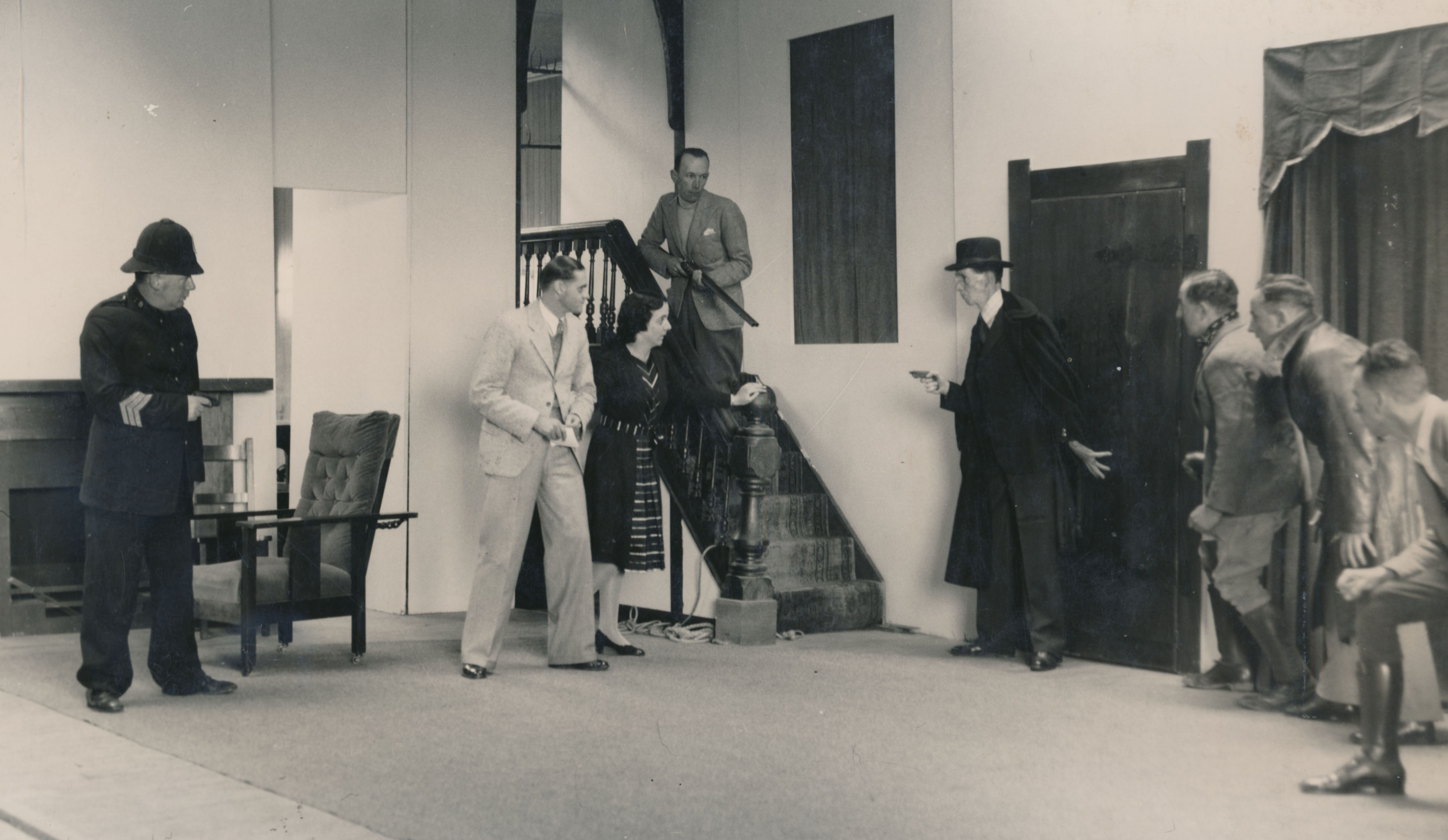
1940 Ashburton Repertory Society production of The Last Hour produced by Ngaio Marsh (third from left)

Bennett was in his mid 20s and a working actor in Ben Greet Repertory, Paris, at the time he wrote The Last Hour, which was one of his earliest plays; it followed the unsuccessful The Return, and Blackmail (which starred Tallulah Bankhead in a 1928 production). Bennett called it "very successful".

The Last Hour was a success, running for 111 performances at the Comedy Theatre in the West End between 20 December 1928 and 23 March 1929. The cast included Cyril Raymond, Lydia Sherwood, Edward O'Neill and Franklin Dyall.

== Film adaptation ==
In 1930 it was made into a British film The Last Hour directed by Walter Forde and starring Stewart Rome and Kathleen Vaughan, the first "talkie" for Nettlefold Studios.

== Bibliography ==
- Goble, Alan. The Complete Index to Literary Sources in Film. Walter de Gruyter, 1999.
- Kabatchnik, Amnon. Blood on the Stage, 1925-1950: Milestone Plays of Crime, Mystery and Detection. Scarecrow Press, 2010.
- Wearing, J. P. The London Stage 1920-1929: A Calendar of Productions, Performers, and Personnel. Rowman & Littlefield, 2014.
