= Audrey Carten =

British actress and playwright (1900–1977)

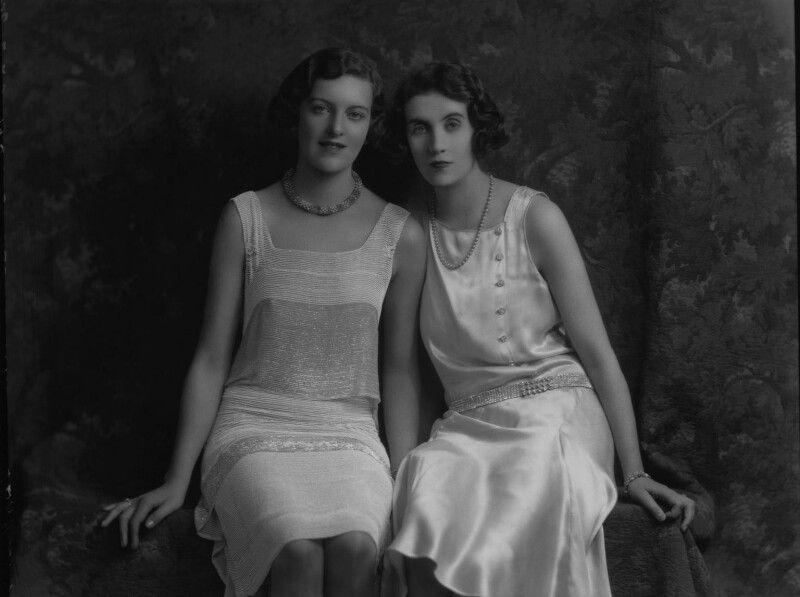
Waveney Hare Bicker-Caarten and Audrey Carten

Audrey Hare Bicker-Caarten (1900–1977) was an actress and playwright who worked under the name of Audrey Carten.

== Biography ==
Audrey Hare Bicker-Caarten was born in 1900 into a middle-class family in Blomfield Road, Maida Vale, London, the daughter of Catherine and Edwin Hare Bicker-Caarten. Among her siblings: Waveney Bicker Caarten (1902–1990) and Kenneth Bicker Caarten (1911–1980).

She attended the Royal Academy of Dramatic Art. Noel Streatfeild, attending the Academy in the same period, remember her as a brilliant and beautiful girl, the most gifted member of her class. They became friends, even if Streatfeild admitted she was second rate in comparison to her. At the Academy her "sensitive, neurasthenic acting had been seen and admired by George Bernard Shaw".

By 1920, Audrey Carten was trying to make a name as actress in Shakespearean productions. In A Midsummer Night's Dream directed by J.B. Fagan, J.C. Trewin points out Carten in 1920 (and later Edith Evans in 1924) was the first to play the role of Helena as a comic rather than purely romantic role.

In 1922, she is the heroine in Bulldog Drummond, produced, directed and performed by Gerald du Maurier. Critics said that Cartern "puts life and vivacity into the part of the somewhat commonplace heroine". According to Du Maurier's daughter, Daphne Du Maurier, in this period, her father had an affair with Carten. In 1923 she played Una Lowry in Du Maurier's The Dancers, at the Wyndham Theatre, cowritten by Du Marier and Viola Tree. Critics praised her "delicate, eerie, sensitive" portrayal; she "was hard and tender and desperate with a convincing mastery of moods". Tallulah Bankhead was playing the role of Maxine, and the two women became close friends. For the next ten years, it was common to see them together at parties, restaurants and various events. After a party where they met Rudolph Valentino and Natacha Rambova, apparently Bankhead said to Carten, "Imagine the poor darling [Valentino n.d.r.], having to fuck that. Is there any wonder he'd rather lick the other side of the stamp?" Bankhead became a surrogate mother to Carten's brother, 11 years old Kenneth, who during the summer break from Eton College, went to live with them.

Lady Caroline Paget remembered to have been introduced to Bankhead and her "friend and travelling companion" Carten in the 1930s.

Another friend of the time was Gwen Farrar: in 1925 Carten and Farrar were arrested for assaulting a police officer who was giving them a parking ticket. At Farrar's death in 1945, Carten was among the main beneficiaries, all women, of Farrar's estate, £361,000: Elizabeth Pollock received £72,000, Carten £52,000 (£1,940,440 in 2025 sterling), Joan Griffiths £12,000, and Norah Blaney £8,000.

At the end of the 1920s, Carten moved to playwriting and together with her sister, Waveney, they wrote a number of successful plays such as Happy Families (1929) (cowritten also with Jane Ross, produced by Gerald du Maurier, Carteen played the main role, Daphne Beresford), Change of Heart (1929) (produced by Du Maurier), Fame (1929), Lady Kathleen (1931), The Day After (1932) (produced by Harry C. Bannister), Always Apologise (1932) (with Margaret Bannerman as lead actress), Table Talk (1932) (produced by Harry C. Bannister), The Day After (1932) (produced by Harry C. Bannister), Late One Night, and Gay Love, this last adapted for the screen in 1934. The plays were produced on Broadway too, and Audrey and her siblings moved ofter between England and the United States. In 1936 Noël Coward produced their adaptation of Jacques Deval's Madamoiselle, with Greer Garson at her first appearance. The production ran for 147 performances.

In 1930, Aubrey Carten appeared in Birds of Prey, a crime movie directed by Basil Dean.

In the late 1930s, with her brother, Kenneth, she frequented the same circle of Elvira Mullens Barney.

Audrey Carten died in Hastings in 1977.

== Legacy ==
The 1962 portrait of Audrey Carteen by Peter Shiel is at the Victoria & Albert Museum.
