= The Secret of the Loch =

1934 film

- Directed by: Milton Rosmer
- Written by: Charles Bennett; Billie Bristow
- Produced by: Bray Wyndham
- Starring: Seymour Hicks
- Cinematography: James Wilson
- Edited by: David Lean
- Music by: Peter Mendoza
- Production company: Wyndham Productions
- Distributed by: Associated British
- Release date: May 1934 (UK)
- Running time: 78 minutes
- Country: United Kingdom
- Language: English

The Secret of the Loch is a 1934 British film directed by Milton Rossner and starring Seymour Hicks and Nancy O'Neil. It was written by Charles Bennett and Billie Bristow, and was made at Ealing Studios as a quota quickie, edited by David Lean. It was the first sound film made about the Loch Ness monster.

== Premise ==
Professor Heggie is determined to prove to a sceptical scientific community the existence of a dinosaur living in Loch Ness. Young London reporter Jimmy Anderson believes him and offers to help. He also falls in love with Angela, the professor's granddaughter. Jimmy finally plucks up the courage to enter the Loch himself, where he comes face to face with the monster.

== Cast ==
- Seymour Hicks as Professor Heggie
- Nancy O'Neil as Angela Heggie
- Gibson Gowland as Angus
- Frederick Peisley as Jimmy Anderson
- Eric Hales as Jack Campbell, the diver
- Rosamund John as Maggie Fraser, the barmaid
- Ben Field as Piermaster
- Robert Wilton as reporter
- Hubert Harben as Professor Blenkinsop Fothergill
- Fewlass Llewellyn as scientist at meeting
- Stafford Hilliard as Macdonald
- D. J. Williams as Judge
- Clive Morton as reporter/photographer in pub
- Cyril McLaglen as mate

== Production ==
The film was made by Bray Wyndham, an independent producer using Ealing’s studios and technicians while Basil Dean had a dispute with RKO. Director Milton Rosmer was borrowed from Gaumont, although George King was originally announced for the job.

Charles Bennett and Billie Bristow visited Loch Ness in December 1933 to research the film. Bennett later said "I went up to the Scottish highlands and searched out Loch Ness. I never met the monster, but I found a wonderful Scotch whiskey." He said that the film was "terrible... but amusing".

Known as Sinister Deeps, the film was shot over four weeks.

In the film, the "monster" was portrayed by a young green iguana.

== Critical reception ==
The Daily Film Renter wrote: "Story is by no means convincing, and direction lacks imagination. ... The below Loch shots smack strongly of a water tank, while the monster, though obviously a living creature, looks none too convincing. Seymour Hicks overdoes his Professor Heggie, ranting on occasion in the old Lyceum manner."

Picturegoer wrote: "A theatrically conceived, theatrically developed, and theatrically characterised melodrama based on the Loch Ness legend. Underwater sequences depicting the 'monster' as a species of overgrown and not particularly terrifying iguana are neatly devised and form key for the best part of the picture. ... The director has, in fact, relied too much on stage methods to tell his story, the bulk of the action of which is confined to interior sets infested with characters one never sees outside the theatre."

Picture Show wrote: "An unconvincing story of a professor who seeks to prove the existence of a monster in a loch. Seymour Hicks as the professor is a little disappointing. The underwater photography is quite good. Fair entertainment if you prefer novelty to polish."

TV Guide called the film "a trite programmer which doesn't make one believe in the humans' actions, much less the sea serpent's."

== See also ==
- List of films featuring dinosaurs
