= Men of Steel (1932 film) =

1932 film

- Directed by: George King
- Written by: Edward Knoblock; Billie Bristow; Douglas Newton (novel)
- Produced by: Ray Wyndham
- Starring: John Stuart; Benita Hume; Heather Angel; Franklin Dyall
- Cinematography: Geoffrey Faithfull; Arthur Grant
- Music by: Arthur Dulay
- Production company: Langham Films
- Distributed by: United Artists
- Release date: September 1932
- Running time: 71 minutes
- Country: United Kingdom
- Language: English

Men of Steel is a 1932 British drama film directed by George King and starring John Stuart, Benita Hume and Heather Angel. The screenplay was adapted by Edward Knoblock and Billie Bristow from a novel by Douglas Newton. It was shot at Walton Studios as a quota quickie for distribution by United Artists.

== Plot ==
James Harg (Stuart) and his father work in a steelmaking plant which is incompetently run, with scant attention being paid to worker safety. In his own time, Harg works on ideas for a revolutionary new manufacturing process for hard steel. When his father is badly injured in a workplace accident resulting from employer negligence, Harg uses some of the compensation payment to develop his invention to a stage where it can be tested in practice. It is a huge success and Harg patents his process. He rises to a position on the board of the company, before staging a coup to oust his former employer and take over the business himself.

== Cast ==
- John Stuart as James 'Iron' Harg
- Benita Hume as Audrey Paxton
- Heather Angel as Ann Ford
- Franklin Dyall as Charles Paxton
- Mary Merrall as Mrs. Harg
- Alexander Field as Sweepy Ford
- Edward Ashley-Cooper as Sylvano

== Production background ==
The film was made at Nettlefold Studios under the quota quickie system for distribution by United Artists and, as its title implies, is set in a steel-producing town. Location filming took place in Middlesbrough, with the steelworks scenes being shot in the long-defunct Acklam Iron and Steel Works in the town, rendering it of great interest to social and industrial historians of the Teesside area. Men of Steel does not appear ever to have been shown on television in the UK, nor has it been made available commercially.

== Preservation status ==
Unlike many quota quickie productions, the film has survived and is available to view by appointment at any of the Mediatheques run by the British Film Institute.

== Bibliography ==
- Chibnall, Steve. Quota Quickies: The Birth of the British 'B' Film. British Film Institute, 2007.
- Low, Rachael. Filmmaking in 1930s Britain. George Allen & Unwin, 1985.
- Wood, Linda. British Films, 1927-1939. British Film Institute, 1986.
