= The House of Trent =

1933 film

- Directed by: Norman Walker
- Written by: Charles Bennett; Billie Bristow
- Produced by: W.G.D. Hutchinson
- Starring: Anne Grey; John Stuart; Wendy Barrie; Peter Gawthorne
- Cinematography: Robert Martin
- Production companies: B & H Productions
- Distributed by: Butcher's Film Service
- Release date: December 1933
- Running time: 74 minutes
- Country: United Kingdom
- Language: English

The House of Trent (also known as Trent's Folly) is a 1933 British drama film directed by Norman Walker and starring Anne Grey, Wendy Barrie, Moore Marriott and Peter Gawthorne. It was written by Charles Bennett and Billie Bristow, and made at Ealing Studios in London.

== Preservation status ==
The British Film Institute National Archive holds a collection of stills but no film or video materials.

== Plot ==
John Trent ia a promising medical student with a bright future who inadvertently causes a patient's death after neglecting his responsibilities at the hospital. His error is sensationalised by Lord Fairdown’s newspaper, which exposes his negligence in a circulation-boosting campaign. However, Fairdown is unaware that John had actually been with Fairdown’s own daughter, Angela, at the time. To fund libel proceedings against Fairdown, John's mother sells the family home. But a legal battle is avoided when she appeals to Fairdown personally, revealing that John's late father was the doctor who once saved Angela’s life. Fairdown relents. Angela abandons her planned arranged marriage to the son of a rival press baron, and chooses a future with John.

== Cast ==
- Anne Grey as Rosemary Trent
- John Stuart as John Trent
- Wendy Barrie as Angela Fairdown
- Peter Gawthorne as Lord Fairdown
- Hope Davey as Joan
- Norah Baring as Barbara
- Hubert Harben as editor
- Moore Marriott as Ferrier
- Jack Raine as Peter
- Dora Gregory as Mary
- Estelle Winwood as Charlotte
- Hay Plumb as jury foreman
- Victor Stanley as Spriggs
- Humberston Wright as coachman

== Reception ==
Kine Weekly wrote: "Anne Grey wins sympathy and displays sense of character as Rosemary, John Stuart contributes a sound and realistic study in the dual role of father and son, Wendy Barrie reveals intelligence and is attractive as Angela, and Peter Gawthorne is good as Fairdown. ... This picture dismisses sophistication and subtlety and relies on homely sentiment for its popular appeal."

The Daily Film Renter wrote: "Directed on rather old-fashioned lines, film manages to sustain interest by virtue of interesting backgrounds and sincere treatment. John Stuart, Anne Grey and Wendy Barrie act well within limitations of their parts."

Picturegoer wrote: "Quite a good homely story ... It is told in a straightforward, unsophisticated manner and contains quite good characterisation. Anne Grey is sympathetic as the mother and John Stuart does well in the dual role of her son and her husband. Wendy Barrie displays intelligence and attractiveness as the girl in the case."
