= Deadlock (1931 film) =

1931 British film by George King

- Cover of Press Book
- Directed by: George King
- Written by: Charles Bennett (story); Billie Bristow (story); H. Fowler Mear
- Produced by: George King
- Starring: Stewart Rome; Marjorie Hume; Warwick Ward
- Production company: George King Productions
- Distributed by: Butcher's Film Service
- Release date: 1931
- Running time: 85 minutes
- Country: United Kingdom
- Language: English

Deadlock is a lost 1931 British crime film directed and produced by George King and starring Stewart Rome, Marjorie Hume and Warwick Ward. It was written by H. Fowler Mear from a story by Charles Bennett and Billie Bristow.

== Preservation status ==
The British Film Institute has classed Deadlock as a lost film, included in its "75 Most Wanted" list. The BFI National Archive holds a collection of ephemera and stills but no film or video materials.

== Plot ==
A murder takes place in a film studio during the shooting of a new film.

== Cast ==
- Stewart Rome as James Whitelaw
- Marjorie Hume as Mrs Whitelaw
- Warwick Ward as Markham Savage
- Annette Benson as Madeleine d'Arblay
- Esmond Knight as John Tring
- Janice Adair as Joan Whitelaw
- Alma Taylor as Mrs. Tring
- Cameron Carr as Tony Makepeace
- Hay Plumb as publicist
- Pauline Peters as maid
- Kiyoshi Takase as Taki
- Philip Godfrey as Nifty Weekes
- Harold Saxon-Snell as Prosecutor

== Production ==
The film was shot at Hepworth Studios and financed by F.W. Baker.

== Reception ==
Film Weekly wrote: "Deadlock is a workmanlike British picture with novel settings, interesting and competent players, and a reasonably good plot leading to an effective climax. ... George King has handled the story and the players with equal facility. He avoids long dialogue passages by breaking them up with appropriate action, and he maintains the atmosphere of suspense which is so vital to a mystery melodrama. The scenes in a talkie studio are very well presented, providing the audience with a fascinating glimpse 'behind the screen'. Good average entertainment that should hold the interest of the majority of filmgoers."

Kine Weekly wrote: "George King scores a distinct success with this well-directed crime story. It is out of the usual rut, has a novel twist to the plot, and is thoroughly convincing. There is no doubt that it will be a very good box-office bet at any hall. It is the first British talkie to have locations inside a film studio. ... Stewart Rome's portrayal of the K.C. is a fine piece of work. He is dignified, natural and convincing. ... George King has told the story very well. Without misleading the audience he keeps a nice sense of suspense and drama until the real guilty party is exposed."
