= They Dare Not Love =

1941 film by James Whale

- Directed by: James Whale
- Screenplay by: Charles Bennett; Ernest Vajda
- Story by: James Edward Grant
- Produced by: Samuel Bischoff
- Starring: George Brent; Martha Scott; Paul Lukas
- Cinematography: Franz Planer
- Edited by: Al Clark
- Music by: Jacques Belasco (uncredited)
- Production company: Columbia Pictures
- Distributed by: Columbia Pictures
- Release date: May 16, 1941
- Running time: 75 minutes
- Country: United States
- Language: English

They Dare Not Love is a 1941 American romantic war drama film directed by James Whale and starring George Brent, Martha Scott and Paul Lukas. Whale left the picture before the end of production; it was the last film released to credit him as director.

== Plot ==
A prince flees Austria when the Nazis take over and settles in London. He encounters a beautiful Austrian émigré who makes him realize his mistake in leaving. He strikes a deal with the Nazis to return in exchange for some Austrian prisoners, but discovers that the Nazis are not to be trusted.

== Cast ==
- George Brent as Prince Kurt von Rotenberg
- Martha Scott as Marta Keller
- Paul Lukas as Baron von Helsing
- Roman Bohnen as Baron Shafter
- Kay Linaker as Barbara Murdoch

Rest of cast listed alphabetically:

- Sig Arno as Louis
- Georgia Backus as German secretary
- Edgar Barrier as Capt. Wilhelm Ehrhardt
- Don Beddoe as Second sailor
- Nicholas Bela as First sailor
- Leon Belasco as Pierre
- Olga Borget as Stewardess
- Egon Brecher as Prof. Keller
- Lloyd Bridges as Blonde officer
- Stanley Brown as Michael
- Jack Chefe as Deck steward
- Peter Cushing as Sub-Lieutenant Blackler
- Leslie Denison as English father
- Paul Deno as Doorman
- Eddie Fetherston as Reporter
- Richard Fiske as Photographer
- Hans Fuerberg as Waiter
- Jack Gardner as Photographer
- Gregory Gaye as Von Mueller
- Jac George as Orchestra leader
- Robert Heller as German attendant
- Brenda Henderson as English girl
- Erwin Kalser as Klaus
- Cy Kendall as Major Kenlein
- Richard Lyon as English boy
- Philo McCullough as Photographer
- David Oliver as Photographer
- Gerald Pierce as Messenger boy
- Paul Power as Society man
- Frank Reicher as Captain
- Georges Renavent as Belgian captain
- John Rogers as Noncommissioned officer
- Bodil Rosing as Leni
- Hans Schumm as Bruckner
- Walter Stahl as Count Marlik
- Marguerita Sylva as Countess Marlik
- Phil Taylor as Hugo
- Philip Van Zandt as Radio operator
- Frederik Vogeding as Carl Schmidt
- Charles Wagenheim as Valet
- Poppy Wilde as Society girl
- Fred Wolff as Waiter

== Production ==
A The Hollywood Reporter article, toward the end of production, reported that Charles Vidor took over from director James Whale, who had fallen ill with the flu. Later, reports of difficulties on set surfaced, including allegations that Whale was abusive toward the cast. Writer Charles Bennett blamed Columbia head Harry Cohn, speculating about a personality conflict and saying that the firing was "... utterly ridiculous, because James Whale was a magnificent director."

They Dare Not Love was Whale's last completed film. He directed a segment of the 1952 RKO film Face to Face, "Hello Out There", but it was not included in the released film.

== Critical reception ==
The New York Times wrote, "with all the proved talent Columbia put behind the manufacture of They Dare Not Love it is hard to understand why the new film at Loew's State should turn out to be the disappointment it is. Granting that James Whale's direction is pedestrian, that the performances of Martha Scott, George Brent and Paul Lukas are no better, we still feel that the root of all evil in this case sprouted back in the story department presided over by Charles Bennett, Ernest Vajda and James Edward Grant. Though the plot they whipped up probably is no more fantastic than some of the things happening in the world today it does not rouse either one's imagination or emotions ... They Dare Not Love is vapid fare."
