= Marie De Becker =

English-American actress (1880–1946)

- Born: Marie Kathleen De Becker; 13 June 1880; London, England
- Died: 23 March 1946 (aged 65); Hollywood, Los Angeles, California, U.S.
- Occupation: Actress
- Years active: 1899–1946

Marie Kathleen De Becker (13 June 1880 – 23 March 1946) was an English-American stage and screen actress.

== Family ==
De Becker was born in Islington, London, the daughter of Benevenuto Nicola de Becker, a shipping clerk, and his wife Catherine (or Kate) Elizabeth de Becker (née Kerin). Two of her siblings were also actors: her sister Ernestine, known as Nesta (mother of actress Ernestine Barrier), and her brother Harold.

== Career ==
Marie De Becker was best known for playing mature character parts, notably in the 1940s films Mrs. Miniver, Random Harvest and Devotion.

De Becker's first stage acting roles were when her family were living in Camberwell, South London. At the age of 19, she played "Joyce" in the 1899 production by J. Pitt Hardacre's Company of East Lynne at the Theatre Metropole in Camberwell, when her young brother Harold had a juvenile part as "Little Willie". In 1900 she played "Humpty Dumpty" (the Nurse) in several Provincial productions (in England and Scotland) of the stage adaptation of John Strange Winter's novel, Bootle's Baby, alongside her sister Nesta as "Mignon", the eponymous baby. In 1902 she appeared as "Jane" in Uncles and Aunts at Dover, Coventry and Cardiff.

== Filmography ==
Year	Title	Role	Notes
1942	Mrs. Miniver	Ada	
1942	Random Harvest	Vicar's wife	
1943	Two Tickets to London	Barmaid	Uncredited
1943	The Chance of a Lifetime	Miss Bailey	Uncredited
1944	The Hour Before the Dawn	Amelia	Uncredited
1944	The Doughgirls	Maid	Uncredited
1944	The Spider Woman	Charwoman	(scenes deleted)
1944	None but the Lonely Heart	Madame La Vaka	Uncredited
1945	Confidential Agent	Miner's Wife	Uncredited
1946	Devotion	Tabby	Uncredited, (final film role)
