= Warn London =

- Theatrical release poster
- Directed by: T. Hayes Hunter
- Written by: Charles Bennett; Billie Bristow
- Based on: novel by Denison Clift
- Starring: Edmund Gwenn; John Loder; Leonora Corbett
- Production company: British Lion Film Corporation
- Release date: May 1934
- Running time: 68 minutes
- Country: United Kingdom
- Language: English

Warn London is a 1934 British thriller film directed by T. Hayes Hunter and starring Edmund Gwenn, John Loder and Leonora Corbett. It was written by Charles Bennett and Billie Bristow based on a novel by Denison Clift.

== Premise ==
A detective goes undercover to infiltrate a gang planning a bullion robbery.

== Cast ==
- Edmund Gwenn as Doctor Herman Krauss
- John Loder as Inspector Yorke / Barraclough
- Leonora Corbett as Jill
- D. A. Clarke-Smith as Doctor Nicoletti
- Garry Marsh as Van Der Meer
- John Turnbull as Inspector Frayne
- Douglas Stewart as Davis
- Raymond Lovell as Prefect

== Reception ==
The Daily Film Renter wrote: "Narrative somewhat on blood and thunder lines, but introducing those elements that should appeal to the mass of kinemagoers. Interesting portrayal by Edmund Gwenn as old criminologist turned crook, and John Loder effective as the detective. Story moves well to denouement that will surprise many patrons. Just the stuff for the popular audience."

Picturegoer wrote: "Incredible and artificial mystery thriller, in which Edmund Gwenn struggles none too successfully to make the role of a German criminologist. ... John Loder is quite good in the dual role of detective and his assailant, but Leonora Corbett is weak as the heroine. D. A. Clarke Smith's performance as the chief crook is extremely good and Gary Marsh is sound as his assistant."
