= Billie Bristow =

British screenwriter (1897–1981)

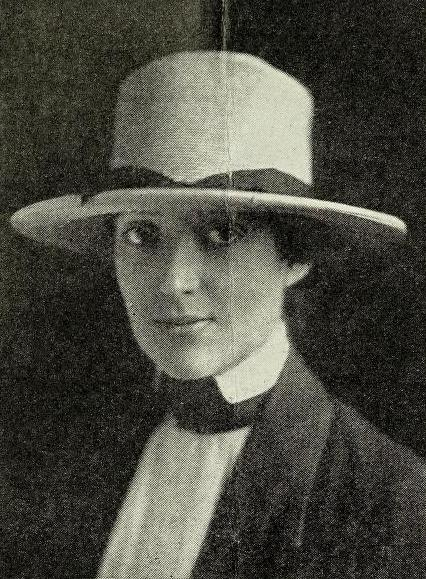
- Billie Bristow, from a 1921 publication.
- Born: Millicent Frances Bristow; 5 January 1897; Cowes, Isle of Wight, England
- Died: 14 March 1981 (aged 84); Cowes, Isle of Wight, England
- Other names: Millicent F. Husband, Millicent Pleydell-Bouverie
- Occupations: Screenwriter, publicist

Millicent Frances Bristow (5 January 1897 – 14 March 1981) known as Billie Bristow and later as Millicent Pleydell-Bouverie, was a British screenwriter, press agent, and publicist, active during the 1920s and 1930s. In the 1940s and 1950s, she lectured and consulted on housing issues.

== Early life and education ==
Bristow was born in Cowes on the Isle of Wight, the daughter of Albert Guyton Bristow and Frances Susan Longworth Bristow. She attended Alexandra College in Southampton.

== Career ==
=== Film industry ===
Bristow began her career as a journalist and studio publicist. She worked at or with several different agencies and studios, including George King Productions, Broadwest, Ensign Productions, PDC, and British Lion.

Bristow wrote articles for The Motion Picture Studio magazine, "The Press Agent and the Star" (1921) and "Principles of Publicity" (1922). In the 1920s, she headed the planning committees for the Kinema Club Carnival and the Kinema Garden Party, industry events held in London to raise money for the Cinematograph Trade Benevolent Fund.

=== Housing ===
Millicent Pleydell-Bouverie became an authority on housing during and after World War II. She compiled a book, The Daily Mail Book of Britain's Post-War Homes (1944), based on input from women and trades organisations. In 1947, she was a delegate to the International Conference of Women when it met in Philadelphia; she also gave lectures on British housing in Detroit, Chicago, and Los Angeles, representing the Home Building Industry's Standing Committee of Great Britain. In 1951 she was a delegate to the Building Research Congress in London. She chaired the housing and rent reform committees of the National Council of Women in the 1950s.

== Selected filmography ==
Bristow often wrote her scripts with Charles Bennett (who wrote many of Alfred Hitchcock's earliest films). Her films ranged in genre, from crime dramas and comedies to a musical, and in settings from Loch Ness to a Northern steelworks to an unnamed South American country.

- Night Mail (1935, crime drama)
- Gay Love (1934, with Bennett and John Paddy Carstairs; a musical adapted from a play)
- Warn London (1934)
- The Secret of the Loch (1934, a monster movie set in Scotland)
- Tiger Bay (1934, a crime drama starring Anna May Wong)
- The House of Trent (1933)
- Shepherd's Warning (1933)
- Men of Steel (1932, with Douglas Newton and Edward Knoblock; set in a steel works)
- Self Made Lady (1932)
- Deadlock (1931, crime drama set in a movie studio)
- Leave it to Me (1930, with Patrick L. Mannock; detective story)
- Too Many Cooks (1930, comedy short, with Laurence Olivier in his first film role)

== Personal life ==
Bristow married twice. She married William F. Husband in 1922. Her second husband was Michael Pleydell-Bouverie; they married in 1935. Her husband died in 1963, and she died on the Isle of Wight in 1981, at the age of 84.
