= Partners Please =

1932 film

- Tony Simpson and Pat Paterson (seated) in the film
- Directed by: Lloyd Richards
- Written by: Charles Bennett
- Starring: Pat Paterson; Tony Simpson; Ronald Ward; Binnie Barnes
- Production company: Producers Distributing Corporation
- Release date: 7 June 1932 (UK)
- Running time: 34 minutes
- Country: United Kingdom
- Language: English

Partners Please is a 1932 British musical comedy film directed by Lloyd Richards and starring Pat Paterson, Tony Simpson, Ronald Ward and Binnie Barnes. It was written by Charles Bennett and shot at Cricklewood Studios as a quota quickie.

== Preservation status ==
The British Film Institute National Archive holds a collection of stills but no film or video materials.

== Plot ==
Hard-up peer Archie Dawlish has invested all his money on the stock market. When the value of his investments crashes he gets a job as a gigolo in a night-club. He proves so popular there that his fiancee Angela realises that the only way to be near him is to become a dancing-partner-for-hire at the club. Subsequently the club is raided and Archie loses his job, but by good fortune his shares increase in value again, and he and Angela can be wed.

== Cast ==
- Pat Paterson as Angela Grittlewood
- Tony Simpson as Archie Dawlish
- Ronald Ward as Eric Hatington
- Alice O'Day as Mrs. Grittlewood
- Binnie Barnes as Billie
- Frederick Moyes as Mr. Grittlewood
- Tony De Lungo as Marano
- Hal Gordon as waiter
- Ralph Truman as CID man

== Reception ==
Film Weekly wrote: "A slender story is set to dance music in this unpretentious featurette. Tony Simpson is as good as can be expected in the role of the vacuous Archie, while Pat Paterson plays up to him moderately well. Frederick Moyes is ineffective as a heavy father. Just fair light entertainment for the unexacting."

Kine Weekly wrote: "Tony Simpson as Archie makes the best of a vapid character, while Pat Paterson competently plays the role of Angela. Ronald Ward is good as the scheming Eric ... Lloyd Richards' direction of the unpretentious story on musical comedy lines is straightforward in manner."

The Daily Film Renter wrote: "Forced humour of well-tried type put across in not very entertaining way. Cast have no chance to shine. ."
