= James Loper =

American television executive (1931–2013)

James Leaders Loper (September 4, 1931 – July 8, 2013) was an American television executive who co-founded KCET in 1964 and served as Executive Director of the Academy of Television Arts & Sciences from 1983 to 1999.

== Life and career ==
Loper was born to John Loper and Ellen Leaders in Phoenix, Arizona, on September 4, 1931. He obtained a bachelor's degree in journalism from Arizona State University in 1953, where he was a member of Phi Sigma Kappa fraternity. He earned his master's degree from the University of Denver in 1957. He moved to Los Angeles, California, in 1959 to begin his doctoral studies at the University of Southern California (USC), which he finished in 1967. He then taught as a faculty member at USC.

Loper co-founded KCET, a PBS affiliate in Los Angeles, during the early 1960s as an affiliate of National Educational Television. He was working on his doctorate at the University of Southern California at the time of KCET's launch in 1964. Loper became KCET's first director of education from 1964 to 1966. He became the President and General Manager from 1966 to 1971, before serving as the President KCET from 1971 until 1983.

Loper then served as the Executive Director of the Academy of Television Arts & Sciences, which holds the Emmy Awards, from 1984 until 1999. Under Loper, the Emmy Awards were expanded to include nominees from cable television in 1988. Loper oversaw the creation of the Archive of American Television, which interviews and archives notable people from the history of television. Loper was also responsible for the Academy of Television Arts & Sciences's relocation to its current headquarters in North Hollywood, California.

James Loper died at his home in Pasadena, California, on July 8, 2013, at the age of 81. He was survived by his wife, former Los Angeles Times columnist Mary Lou Loper, and two children, Elizabeth Serhan and James L. Loper Jr.
