= Devotion (1946 film) =

1946 film directed by Curtis Bernhardt

- Theatrical release poster
- Directed by: Curtis Bernhardt
- Screenplay by: Keith Winter; Edward Chodorov (uncredited)
- Story by: Theodore Reeves
- Produced by: Robert Buckner
- Starring: Ida Lupino; Paul Henreid; Olivia de Havilland; Sydney Greenstreet
- Cinematography: Ernest Haller
- Edited by: Rudi Fehr
- Music by: Erich Wolfgang Korngold
- Production company: Warner Bros. Pictures
- Distributed by: Warner Bros. Pictures
- Release date: April 20, 1946 (USA)
- Running time: 107 minutes
- Country: United States
- Language: English

Devotion is a 1946 American biographical film directed by Curtis Bernhardt and starring Ida Lupino, Paul Henreid, Olivia de Havilland, and Sydney Greenstreet. Based on a story by Theodore Reeves, the film is a highly fictionalized account of the lives of the Brontë sisters. The movie features Montagu Love's last role; he died almost three years before the film's delayed release.

== Plot ==
The story takes place in the early 1800s, when the Brontë sisters Charlotte and Anne have decided to leave their family – their sister Emily, their brother Branwell, their aunt and their vicar father – to take positions as governesses in other families. The two sisters long to break free from their tedious life and get experiences from the outside world, to prepare for their careers as writers.

They intend to allocate a portion of their income from working as governesses to fund their brother Branwell's art education in London.

One night when Bran is getting drunk at a local tavern, a man named Arthur Nicholls, his father's new curate, arrives. The drunken Bran insists that Arthur accompany him to the vicarage. At first Arthur refuses, believing it is too late in the evening. When he realizes how drunk Bran has become, he accompanies him to see that he gets home safely.

Emily, who answers the door, mistakes Arthur for one of Bran's drunken friends and treats him with contempt. The next day Bran leaves for London again, and Arthur reappears at the house. He is greeted by the unwelcoming Mr. Brontë, and soon Emily realizes her mistake and she and Arthur become good friends. They go on walks together, and one day Emily shows Arthur a lonely house on a hill, the one that inspired her writing her novel, Wuthering Heights.

Time passes and a disillusioned Bran returns home from London. He blames all his sisters for his failure as a painter. Soon after, Charlotte and Anne also return home, and at a ball at the neighboring Thornton house, Arthur is struck by Charlotte's beauty and falls in love. When Charlotte realizes that Emily is interested in Arthur, she becomes interested in him as well. Later, a drunken Bran disrupts the dance, and Arthur leaves the dance and takes him home.

Arthur discovers that Charlotte wants to take Emily with her to Brussels to further their educations. Since he is in love with Charlotte, he decides to sponsor the trip. He secretly buys a painting from Bran, and with the money the sisters are able to go to Europe. Emily hopes that Arthur will ask her to stay behind, but he has fallen in love with Charlotte and will not comply.

The girls start their education at the school of Monsieur and Madame Heger, located in Brussels. Before long Charlotte admits to Emily that she has received unwelcome attentions while she was a governess and that after she returned home, Arthur kissed her. Emily is heartbroken. That night, Emily dreams about the moors and a threatening black horseman. Not so long after that, Monsieur Heger takes Charlotte privately to an exhibition and kisses her.

When she returns to the Hegers' house, Emily is already packing, having received a letter from Anne saying that Bran is ill. Charlotte and Emily immediately rush back to England, and once they are back, they both start writing their novels. Bran reads them both and then he tells Emily that they are both in love with the same man. Eventually the sisters learn that Arthur bought the painting that financed their trip to Europe, and Emily insists that they should repay him.

One day Emily can't find Bran so she goes out in the rain looking for him. She finds him, and shortly after that he collapses and dies. Emily's book Wuthering Heights and Charlotte's book Jane Eyre are both published under male pseudonyms. Despite the fact that Charlotte's sells better, the famous author William Makepeace Thackeray believes that Emily's is the greater.

Thackeray meets Charlotte and introduces her to London society. She convinces him to take her to the poverty-stricken East End, where Arthur now works. Arthur admits to Charlotte that he loves her, but because Emily loved him, he felt he could not stay in Yorkshire.

Charlotte learns that Emily is taken seriously ill, and she hurries home to Yorkshire. She arrives just in time to say goodbye before her sister dies from her illness. Emily's spirit wanders the moors and sees the black horseman again. After Emily's demise Arthur returns to woo Charlotte.

== Cast ==
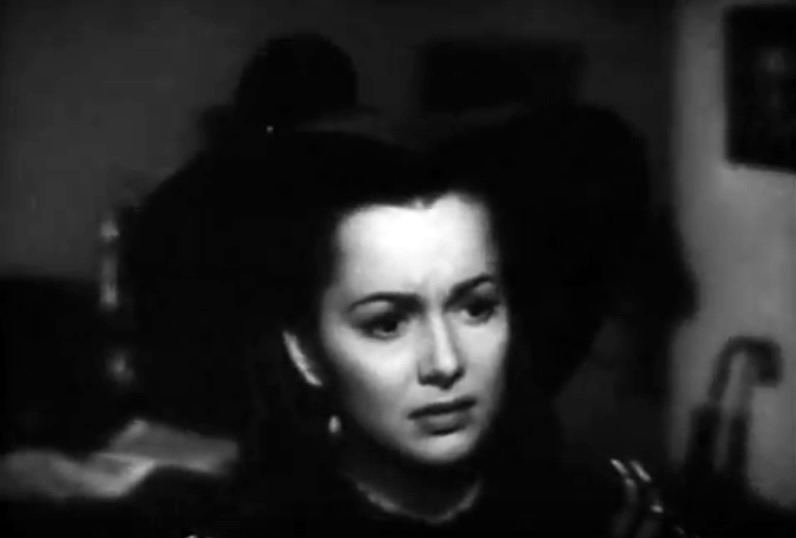
De Havilland in Devotion trailer

- Ida Lupino as Emily Brontë
- Paul Henreid as Reverend Arthur Nicholls
- Olivia de Havilland as Charlotte Brontë. Despite playing the biggest part, she was only credited third due to her lawsuit against Warner Brothers.
- Sydney Greenstreet as William Makepeace Thackeray
- Nancy Coleman as Anne Brontë
- Arthur Kennedy as Branwell Brontë
- Dame May Whitty as Lady Thornton
- Victor Francen as Monsieur Heger
- Montagu Love as Reverend Bronte
- Ethel Griffies as Aunt Branwell
- Edmund Breon as Sir John Thornton
- Odette Myrtil as Madame Heger
- Doris Lloyd as Mrs. Ingraham
- Marie De Becker as Tabby
- Eily Malyon as Lady Thornton's friend at the ball
- Reginald Sheffield as Charles Dickens
- Harry Cording as Coachman (uncredited)
- Leo White as Waiter (uncredited)

== Production ==
Devotion was filmed between November 11, 1942, and mid-February 1943, but its screening was delayed until April 5, 1946, at the Strand Theater in Manhattan, due to a lawsuit by Olivia de Havilland against Warner Bros. Pictures. De Havilland successfully sued her studio to terminate her contract without providing the studio an extra six months to make up for her time on suspension. It proved a landmark case for the industry.

== Reception ==
Bosley Crowther wrote in The New York Times: “The Warners have simplified matters to an almost irreducible extreme and have found an explanation for the Brontës in Louisa May Alcott terms. They have visioned sombrous Emily, the author of Wuthering Heights, and Charlotte, the writer of Jane Eyre, as a couple of 'little women' with a gift." Despite an excellent score by Erich Wolfgang Korngold, and production values and an ending that hearkened back to the earlier film version of Wuthering Heights (1939) from another production company, the press generally put Devotion down as "a mawkish costume romance, even with identities removed. Presented as the story of the Brontës—and with the secondary characters poorly played—it is a ridiculous tax upon reason and an insult to plain intelligence."

On February 17, 1947, Lux Radio Theatre broadcast a 60-minute radio adaptation of the movie starring Jane Wyman, Vincent Price and Virginia Bruce.
