= Blackmail (1929 film) =

1929 film by Alfred Hitchcock

- UK trade advert
- Directed by: Alfred Hitchcock
- Screenplay by: Alfred Hitchcock; Benn W. Levy
- Based on: Blackmail (play) by Charles Bennett
- Produced by: John Maxwell
- Starring: Anny Ondra; John Longden; Donald Calthrop; Cyril Ritchard
- Cinematography: Jack E. Cox
- Edited by: Emile de Ruelle
- Music by: Jimmy Campbell and Reg Connelly; Hubert Bath and Harry Stafford (arrangements); Billy Mayerl (song: "Miss Up-to-Date")
- Production company: British International Pictures (BIP)
- Distributed by: Wardour Films
- Release date: 28 July 1929 (UK)
- Running time: 85 minutes (7136 ft sound); 76 minutes (6740 ft silent, 2012 restoration)
- Country: United Kingdom
- Language: English

Blackmail is a 1929 British crime thriller film directed by Alfred Hitchcock and starring Anny Ondra, John Longden, Donald Calthrop and Cyril Ritchard. Based on the 1928 play of the same name by Charles Bennett, the film is about a London woman who is blackmailed after killing a man who tries to rape her.

After starting production as a silent film, British International Pictures decided to adapt Blackmail into a separate sound film. It became the first successful European talkie; a silent version was released for cinemas not equipped for sound (at 6,740 feet), with the sound version (7,136 feet) released at the same time. Both versions are held in the British Film Institute collection.

Blackmail is frequently cited as the first British sound feature film. It was voted the best British film of 1929 in a UK poll the year it was released. In 2017 a poll of 150 actors, directors, writers, producers and critics for Time Out magazine ranked Blackmail as the 59th best British film ever.

== Plot ==
The silent (left) and sound (right) versions of Blackmail

On 26 April 1929, Scotland Yard Detective Frank Webber escorts his girlfriend Alice White to a teahouse. They have an argument and Frank storms out. While reconsidering his action, he sees Alice leave with Mr. Crewe, an artist she had earlier agreed to meet.

Crewe persuades a reluctant Alice into coming up to see his studio. She admires a painting of a laughing clown, and uses his palette and brushes to paint a cartoonish drawing of a face; guiding her hand, he adds a few strokes of a naked feminine figure, and she signs the picture with her name. He gives her a dancer's outfit and Crewe sings and plays "Miss Up-to-Date" on the piano.

Crewe steals a kiss, to Alice's disgust, but as she is changing and preparing to leave, he takes her dress from the changing area. He attempts to rape her; her cries for help are not heard on the street below. In desperation, Alice grabs a nearby bread knife and kills him. She angrily tears a hole in the painting of the clown, then leaves after attempting to remove any evidence of her presence in the flat, but accidentally leaves her gloves behind. She walks the streets of London all night in a daze.

When the body is found, Frank is assigned to the case and finds one of Alice's gloves. He also recognizes the dead man, but conceals this from his superior. Taking the glove, he goes to see Alice at her father's tobacco shop, but she is too distraught to speak.

As they speak privately in the shop's telephone booth, a man named Tracy arrives. He had seen Alice go up to Crewe's flat, and he has one of the gloves . When he sees Frank with the other one, he attempts to blackmail them. His first demands are petty ones, and they accede. Frank learns by phone that Tracy is wanted for questioning: he was seen near the scene and has a criminal record. Frank sends for policemen and tells Tracy he will pay for the murder.

Alice is apprehensive, but still does not speak up. The tension mounts. When the police arrive, Tracy's nerve finally breaks and he flees. The chase leads to the British Museum, where he clambers onto the domed roof of the Reading Room and slips, crashing through a skylight and falling to his death inside. The police assume he was the murderer.

Unaware of this, Alice feels compelled to give herself up and goes to see the Chief Inspector at New Scotland Yard. Before she can confess to him, the inspector receives a telephone call and asks Frank to deal with Alice. She finally tells Frank the truth—that it was self-defence against an attack she cannot bear to speak of—and they leave together. As they do, a policeman walks past, carrying the damaged painting of the laughing clown and the cartoon canvas where Alice painted over her name.

== Cast ==
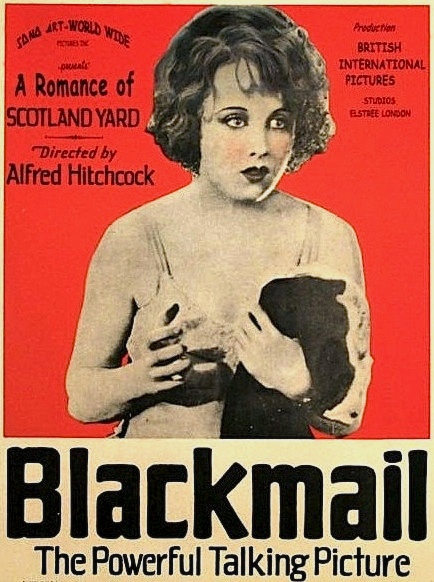
An advertisement

Screenshot of the film featuring Ondra

- Anny Ondra as Alice White
  - Joan Barry as Alice White (voice)
- Sara Allgood as Mrs. White
- Charles Paton as Mr. White
- John Longden as Detective Frank Webber
- Donald Calthrop as Tracy
- Cyril Ritchard as Mr. Crewe, an artist
- Hannah Jones as the landlady
- Harvey Braban as the Chief Inspector (sound version)
  - Sam Livesey as the Chief Inspector (silent version)
- Jacque Carter as boy
- Johnny Butt as Sergeant
- Phyllis Konstam as gossiping neighbour
- Phyllis Monkman as gossip woman
- Percy Parsons as crook

== Production ==
The film began production as a silent film. To cash in on the new popularity of talkies, the film's producer, John Maxwell of British International Pictures, gave Hitchcock the go-ahead to film a portion of the movie in sound. Most sources state that Hitchcock thought the idea absurd and surreptitiously filmed almost the entire feature in sound, but in reality the silent version - which was largely completed - was cleverly used for several sequences with non-synchronous sound and dialogue where the actors faces were not visible.

The opening 6 1/2 minutes of the sound version are silent, with musical accompaniment, as are numerous shorter scenes later, and the entire final chase sequence is from the silent version with occasional non-synchronized vocal interjections, including Donald Calthrop's last words on the dome of the British Museum's reading room. Thus it can be argued that the sound version of Blackmail, despite BIP's publicity, is a "part-talkie". Gaumont-British's High Treason, directed by Maurice Elvey was also turned into a sound film mid-way during production. Much like Blackmail, much of the silent footage in High Treason was maintained and dubbed over for the sound version, with Elvey himself voicing some of the minor characters.

Blackmail, marketed as one of Britain's earliest "all-talkie" feature films, was recorded in the RCA Photophone sound-on-film process. (The first U.S. all-talking film, Lights of New York, was released in July 1928 by Warner Brothers in their Vitaphone sound-on-disc process.) The film was shot at British and Dominions Imperial Studios soundstage in Borehamwood, the first purpose-built sound studio in Europe.

Lead actress Anny Ondra was raised in Prague and had a pronounced Czech accent that was felt unsuitable for the film. Sound was in its infancy at the time and it was not possible to post-dub her voice. Rather than replace her and reshoot her scenes, actress Joan Barry was hired to speak the dialogue off-camera while Ondra lip-synched her lines. This makes Ondra's performance seem slightly awkward.

Hitchcock used several elements that would become Hitchcock "trademarks" including a beautiful blonde in peril and a famous landmark in the finale. Without informing the producers, Hitchcock used the Schüfftan process to film the scenes in the Reading Room of the British Museum since the light levels were too low for normal filming.

The film was a critical and commercial hit. The sound was praised as inventive. A completed silent version of Blackmail was released in 1929 shortly after the talkie version hit cinemas. The silent version of Blackmail actually ran longer in cinemas and proved more popular, largely because most cinemas in Britain were not yet equipped for sound. Despite the popularity of the silent version, the landmark talkie version of Blackmail is the one best remembered, and is the version now generally available although some critics consider the silent version superior. Alfred Hitchcock filmed the silent version with Sam Livesey as the Chief Inspector and the sound version with Harvey Braban in the same role.

=== Hitchcock's cameo ===
Alfred Hitchcock (left) in a cameo appearance

Alfred Hitchcock's cameo, a signature occurrence in many of Hitchcock's films, shows him being bothered by a small boy as he reads a book on the London Underground. This is probably the lengthiest of Hitchcock's cameo appearances and he appears around 10 minutes after the start. As the director became better known to audiences, especially when he appeared as the host of his own television series, he dramatically shortened his on-screen appearances.

== Release and reception ==
First screened to press and cinema distributors on 21 June 1929 at the Regal at Marble Arch, the film premiered at the Capitol Cinema in London on 28 July 1929. Blackmail was one of the most successful releases of that year, and received critical praise.

In a public poll, Blackmail was voted the best British film of 1929, largely on the basis of the silent version, which, as mentioned above, was more widely seen. In the same national UK poll, the best films of their respective years were The Constant Nymph (1928), Rookery Nook (1930), The Middle Watch (1931), and Sunshine Susie (1932).

Censors in Australia initially banned the film, but this was reversed by the Appeal board which permitted the film with a cut of approximately 200 feet consisting of the sequence with the stabbing.

== Legacy ==
As an early sound film, Blackmail frequently is cited by film historians as a landmark film, and is often cited as the first truly British "all-talkie" feature film. Two future directors worked on this production: Ronald Neame operated the clapperboard and Michael Powell took on-set publicity photographs.

Earlier British part-sound films include:

- The Gentleman, a short film in the Phonofilm sound-on-film process, was an excerpt of The 9 to 11 Revue, directed by William J. Elliott, and released in the UK in June 1925.
- The part-sound The Clue of the New Pin, based on the novel by Edgar Wallace, and filmed in British Phototone, a sound-on-disc system using 12-inch discs.
- The Crimson Circle, a UK-German silent film, also based on a Wallace novel, dubbed after the fact with the Phonofilm sound-on-film process.
- Black Waters, a British-produced sound film shot in the US with an almost exclusively American cast and crew, and released on 6 April 1929.

In March 1929, New Pin and Crimson Circle were trade-shown at the same screening for film exhibitors in London.

The plot of Downton Abbey: A New Era (2022), produced by Ronald Neame's grandson Gareth Neame, is partly inspired by Blackmail.

== Preservation status and home media ==
A Laserdisc of the talkie version was released by the Criterion Collection in 1992.

A restoration of Blackmail's silent version was completed in 2012, as part of the BFI's £2 million "Save the Hitchcock 9" project to restore all of the director's surviving silent films.

At the beginning of 2025, Blackmail entered the public domain in the United States.

== See also ==
- List of early sound feature films (1926–1929)
- 2025 in public domain
