= Page From a Diary =

1936 play

- Written by: Charles Bennett
- Original language: English
- Genre: Drama

Premiere
- Date premiered: 16 January 1936
- Place premiered: Garrick Theatre, London

Page From a Diary is a 1936 play by the British writer Charles Bennett. It is a melodrama set on the Northwest Frontier where a British unit is trapped by the enemy and a Captain's wife is involved in a love triangle.

It ran for 33 performances at the Garrick Theatre in London's West End. The cast included Greer Garson and Ernst Deutsch.

== Bibliography ==
- Kabatchnik, Amnon. Blood on the Stage, 1925-1950: Milestone Plays of Crime, Mystery and Detection. Scarecrow Press, 2010.
- Troyan, Michael. A Rose for Mrs. Miniver: The Life of Greer Garson. University Press of Kentucky, 2010.
