= Blackmail (play) =

1928 play

- Cover of the 1929 novelisation of the play
- Written by: Charles Bennett
- Original language: English
- Genre: Thriller

Premiere
- Date premiered: 28 February 1928
- Place premiered: Comedy Theatre, London

Blackmail is a 1928 thriller play by the British writer Charles Bennett. The plot is about an artist's model in Chelsea who kills an artist when he attempts to assault her.

It ran for 38 performances at the Globe Theatre in London's West End. Directed by Raymond Massey, it was the playwright's first West End production. It was chosen by the impresario Albert H. Woods as a vehicle for the American star Tallulah Bankhead. It was shortest British run Bankhead had been in. It was initially considered a disappointment and Woods never staged the play on Broadway. However, over the following decade it became a popular work on tour in Britain and Ireland.

== Adaptation ==
The following year it was made into Blackmail, a pioneering early sound film directed by Alfred Hitchcock and starring Anny Ondra. It was also novelised by Ruth Alexander.

== Bibliography ==
- Goble, Alan. The Complete Index to Literary Sources in Film. Walter de Gruyter, 1999.
- Kabatchnik, Amnon. Blood on the Stage, 1925-1950: Milestone Plays of Crime, Mystery and Detection. Scarecrow Press, 2010.
- Wearing, J. P. The London Stage 1920-1929: A Calendar of Productions, Performers, and Personnel. Rowman & Littlefield, 2014.
