= Academy of Television Arts & Sciences Foundation =

Charitable arm of the Academy of Television Arts & Sciences

- Location(s): 5220 Lankershim Blvd. North Hollywood, Los Angeles 91601-3109
- Region served: Television industry
- Website: www.emmysfoundation.org

The Academy of Television Arts & Sciences Foundation is the charitable arm of the Academy of Television Arts & Sciences. The Foundation’s educational and preservation programs include the Summer Internship program, the College Television Awards, the Fred Rogers Memorial Scholarship and The Interviews: An Oral History of Television which chronicles the stories of TV's pioneers, innovators, artists and legends.

== College Television Awards ==
The College Television Awards recognize excellence in college student-produced video, digital and film productions. Every year, students from across the nation are given the opportunity to submit their projects to one of twelve categories, including “Animation,” “Documentary,” “Drama,” and “Music (Best Composition)”. The College Television Awards are also known as College Emmy Awards. In the eighties it was also called "Academy of Television Arts and Sciences Frank O’Connor Memorial Award".

The Loreen Arbus Focus on Disability Scholarship was launched in 2009 to recognize student filmmakers who shed light on people with disabilities. In addition to monetary awards, winners have access to a television industry mentor and in-person pitch meeting. The winners are honored at the College Television Awards Gala, held every March in Los Angeles.

Past celebrities who have attended include Dancing with the Stars host Tom Bergeron, who has hosted the event four times, and Heroes actor Masi Oka. In 2010, So You Think You Can Dance producer Nigel Lythgoe received the Philanthropy Award for his work with “Idol Gives Back” and the non-profit organization “Dizzy Feet”. It will be awarded to him by fellow So You Think You Can Dance judge Adam Shankman. Other presenters include CSI actor Hill Harper, Yvette Nicole Brown and Gillian Jacobs from Community, Chris Colfer from Glee, Busy Philipps from ABC’s Cougar Town, Kerr Smith from Life Unexpected, the cast of MTV's The Buried Life, Amanda Righetti and Tim Kang from The Mentalist, Paris Barclay of In Treatment, Benito Martinez from The Shield, and Jon Tenney of The Closer. The two featured presenters of the 2009 College Television Awards were 2017 Emmy nominee Shailene Woodley from The Secret Life of the American Teenager and more recently, HBO's Big Little Lies and Corey Reynolds of The Closer.

== Summer Internship Program ==
The Summer Internship Program places college students in companies such as NBC, HBO, Sony and Warner Bros. for 8 weeks in Los Angeles to learn hands-on from professionals in a chosen field. There is a $4000 stipend and students work full 40-hour work weeks. The 30 different fields students can choose from include Animation, Casting, Cinematography, Editing, Music, Publicity, Television Scriptwriting and Unscripted Television.

== Fred Rogers Memorial Scholarship ==
The Fred Rogers Memorial Scholarship, was created to further the values and principles of television icon Fred Rogers, creator and long-time host of the PBS show “Mister Rogers’ Neighborhood” for 34 years. It is annually given to undergraduate and graduate students pursuing careers in children’s media, with a rigorous selection process culminating in a $10,000 award to the three chosen recipients. The grants are underwritten by Ernst & Young and winners also receive mentors who work with them throughout the school year. Applicants demonstrate their commitment to children’s programming by having experience in at least two of the following fields: Early Childhood Education, Child Development and Psychology, Television / Film Production, Music or Animation. In 2010, the Scholarships were handed out at the inaugural Fred Forward Conference in Pittsburgh, Fred Rogers’ hometown. There were nearly 100 applicants and around 150 attendees.

== The Interviews: An Oral History of Television ==
The Interviews: An Oral History of Television (formerly the Archive of American Television) is an online resource with hundreds of interviews with TV movers and shakers. Some of the people documented include Leonard Nimoy, Mary Tyler Moore, Dick Wolf, Walter Cronkite, Bob Barker, Alan Alda and Michael J. Fox. The interviews are organized on the Archive site for the viewers’ convenience. New interviews are added with more than 200 completed already.

== Television Academy Foundation Auction ==
The Television Academy Foundation hosts an annual auction on eBay every Emmy season with unique opportunities for fans. In 2009, fans had the chance to attend a table reading for the Seth MacFarlane Fox comedy Family Guy, a set visit to Melrose Place, tickets for the finale taping of So You Think You Can Dance and entry to the HBO Emmys after-party. They can also bid on such items as Hugh Laurie’s autographed flame cane from House, signed collectibles from Grey's Anatomy and the Emmy Award show Trophy Girl dress by Lauren Conrad. Proceeds go to the Foundation’s initiatives.
