= Two Way Street (film) =

- Written by: Charles Bennett; Billie Bristow
- Starring: Sari Maritza; James Raglan; Quentin MacPherson; Henry Wilcoxon; Naomi Waters; Maud Gill; Tom Helmore
- Production company: Nettlefold Productions
- Release date: 1930
- Country: United Kingdom
- Language: English

Two Way Street is a 1930 British drama film directed by George King, based on an original story by Charles Bennett, in which a diamond necklace is stolen from a wealthy young man; the object of his affections is the girlfriend of the jewelry thief. The young man is captured by a gang, but "there is a happy ending."

== Cast ==
- Sari Maritza as Jill Whistler
- James Raglan
- Quentin MacPherson
- Henry Wilcoxon
- Naomi Waters
- Maud Gill
- Tom Helmore
