= British Entertainment History Project =

The British Entertainment History Project (BEHP) records and preserves interviews with the men and women who have worked in British film, television, radio and theatre industries over the last 100 years "to ensure that their lives and experiences are preserved for future generations".

== History ==
Founded in 1987 by Roy Fowler*, the History Project started as an independent volunteer project by members of the industry trade union, ACTT, who wanted to preserve the stories and memories of the lives of the men and women who had been working in the various film and television industries. The organisation was originally called the ACTT History Project, reflecting the fact that though it was an entirely separate project run by volunteers, it was nevertheless supported by the ACTT union. In 1991, the ACTT merged with the Broadcasting and Entertainment Trades Alliance, to form BECTU (Broadcasting, Entertainment, Cinematograph and Theatre Union) and the ACTT History Project became known as the BECTU History Project. In 2016, it was officially registered as a company limited by guarantee, as an independent, non-profit, voluntary organisation, and renamed the British Entertainment History Project.It is currently a sector within the Prospect union.

- for more on Roy Fowler see https://www.bdcmuseum.org.uk/news/roy-fowler-a-tribute

== Archive collection ==
The internationally recognised archive collection has grown to 800+ oral history interviews and over 4,000 hours of audio and video recordings making it the largest independent oral history collection of its kind in the UK.

The recordings are used as a primary source by researchers and students, especially in the fields of media and social history. In addition, the archive is used by television and radio programmes, film documentaries, publishers, authors, historians, obituarists and journalists as well as the general public. It also provides a rich source of additional DVD 'extras'. Other partnerships and collaborations have included work with the BFI, the BBC, the British Universities Film & Video Council [now Learning on Screen] and with universities such as the University of East Anglia. In 2017, the BEHP began working with Sussex University and other partners as part of the '100 voices That Made The BBC', which is part of the Connected Histories of the BBC, funded by the Arts and Humanities Research Council (AHRC). From 2018 The Scottish Broadcast & TV Heritage Project recordings were added to the collection.

Copies of all interview recordings also form part of the National Film archive of the British Film Institute and a significant number were made available as part of BFI Screen Online.

== Interviewees ==
The interviewees are drawn from professionals who have worked in the United Kingdom, but also include British professionals who worked abroad. Although the archive includes many well-known interviewees, the overall emphasis is on reflecting genuine breadth and variety, including those who may not be well known, but who, nevertheless have contributed to, or witnessed, important productions or have a unique story. Capturing their reminiscences provides information about the cultural history of Britain's broadcasting and entertainment, whilst also shining a light on employment practices and the social history of particular periods. The aim is that future historians of the entertainment industry will have access to testimonies from participants in the film, television, theatre and other media industries. There is a regular update on the work of the project in The Veteran magazine (the magazine of The British Cinema and Television Veterans) which also publishes some extracts from interviews.

== Notable interviewees ==
- John Ammonds
- Derek Boshier
- Dallas Bower
- Earl Cameron
- David Cobham
- Kenny Coyle, (web developer)
- Jill Craigie
- Charles Crichton
- Barry Cryer
- John Dark
- Colin Dean
- Desmond Dickinson
- Clive Donner
- Edward Dryhurst
- John Elliot (author)
- David Elstein
- Bryan Forbes
- Freddie Francis
- Cyril Frankel
- Harold French
- [[James GilbertJames Gilbert (producer) (Director,producer)]]
- Bob Godfrey
- Jack Gold
- Ronald Grant (Curator, Film Historian, Projectionist)
- Guy Green (filmmaker)
- John Halas
- Gordon Hales
- John Hough (director)
- Joan Kemp-Welch
- John Krish
- [[Dennis Main WilsonDennis Main Wilson (TV and Radio Producer)]]
- Bill Mason (director)
- Ernest Maxin
- Christopher Miles
- John Mills
- Ivor Montagu
- Christopher Morahan
- Diana Morgan (screenwriter)
- [[Pete MurrayPete Murray (DJ) (Actor, Presenter, Disc Jockey)]]
- [[Esther RantzenEsther Rantzen (TV Presenter, Producer)]]
- [[Philip SavillePhilip Saville (Director, Writer, Actor)]]
- John Schlesinger
- Francis Searle
- Don Sharp
- Michael
  Smedley-Aston
- [[Madeleine SmithMadeline Smith (Actress)]]
- Jeremy Summers
- Diane Tammes
- Bernard Vorhaus
- Agnes Wilkie (TV news, Teletext)
- Aida Young

== Awards ==
In 1999, the History Project was awarded a £3,500 grant from the Kraszna Krausz Foundation to help towards the enormous task of transcribing hundreds of audio tapes.

In 2010, the History Project was honored with a Lifetime Contribution to Broadcasting Award at a ceremony at BAFTA.

== See also ==
- The Interviews: An Oral History of Television
