= The Last Hour (1930 film) =

1930 film

- Trade show advertisement
- Directed by: Walter Forde
- Written by: H. Fowler Mear
- Based on: The Last Hour by Charles Bennett
- Produced by: Archibald Nettlefold; Edward Sloman
- Starring: Richard Cooper; Stewart Rome; Kathleen Vaughan
- Cinematography: Geoffrey Faithfull
- Edited by: Walter Forde
- Production company: Nettlefold Films
- Distributed by: Butcher's Film Service
- Release date: 25 June 1930
- Running time: 77 minutes
- Country: United Kingdom
- Language: English

The Last Hour is a lost 1930 British comedy crime film directed by Walter Forde and starring Richard Cooper, Stewart Rome and Kathleen Vaughan. It was adapted by H. Fowler Mear from the successful 1928 play of the same title by Charles Bennett.

== Preservation status ==
The British Film Institute has classed The Last Hour as a lost film. Its National Archive holds a collection of ephemera and stills but no film or video materials.

== Plot ==
The evil international spy Prince Nicola de Kovatch has stolen secret plans for a death-ray weapon. Secret Service-man Charles Lister tries to get them back.

== Cast ==
- Stewart Rome as Prince Nicola de Kovatch
- Richard Cooper as Byron
- Kathleen Vaughan as Mary Tregellis
- Alexander Field as Smarty Walker
- Wilfred Shine as Tregellis
- James Raglan as Charles Lister
- George Bealby as Blumfeld
- Frank Arlton as George
- Bill Shine as Ben

== Production ==
The film was shot at Twickenham Studios with sets were designed by William Saunders.

== Reception ==
Kine Weekly wrote: "The producer, Walter Forde, has brought little imagination into play in the handling of this picture, for it is, to all intents and purposes, a literal adaptation of the stage play. The battle of wits between the Secret Service and the spy is confined to talk, and, except for the spectacular climax showing the destruction of the airship, the action takes place in one room. The characterisation is, however, well above, the average, and is sufficiently good to impart life and realism to the proceedings."

The Daily Film Renter wrote: "Solid thriller, based on Comedy Theatre success of same title. Better than the stage play, which was itself a winner. Excellent acting by West End stars. Certainly one of the outstanding British talkies of the year, and one that should figure in every exhibitor's book."

Picture Show wrote: "Hectic murder mystery melodrama, featuring Stewart Rome as a foreign Prince who steals plans of the death ray, James Raglan as the secret service man who gets them back after many plots and counter-plots, and finally climax in a flght in a blazing airship. Kathleen Vaughan and Richard Cooper do good work."
