= Gwen Farrar =

Revue and music-hall comedian (1897–1944)

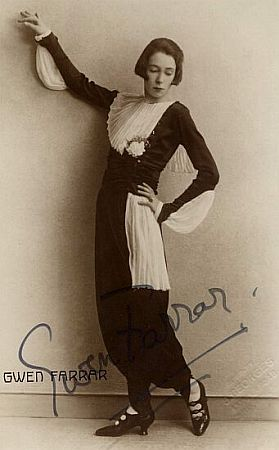
Gwen Farrar, circa 1925

Gwendoline "Gwen" Farrar (14 July 1897 – 25 December 1944) was an English duettist, cellist, singer, actress and comedian.

== Early life ==
Gwendoline Farrar was born on 14 July 1897, at 108 Park Street, London. She was the third of six daughters of Sir George Farrar, a prominent figure in South African mining and politics, and Ella Mabel Waylen (c.1869–1922). She attended Heathfield School briefly and then trained as a classical cellist with Herbert Walenn. She received her LRAM in 1917.

== Career ==
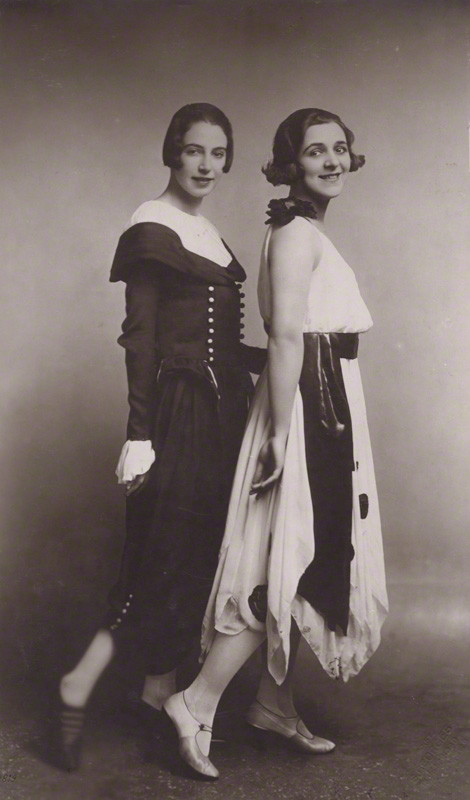
Gwen Farrar and Norah Blaney, 1920s

Toward the end of World War I, Farrar and Norah Blaney formed a double act, playing the cello and piano, respectively, in comedic performances for British troops. Between 1921 and 1924, they appeared at leading London and provincial variety theatres, as well as in the cabaret shows: Pot Luck! (1921), starring Jack Hulbert and Beatrice Lillie; Rats (1923), starring Alfred Lester and Gertrude Lawrence; Yes! (1923), starring A. W. Bascomb, Blaney and Farrar, all of which were presented by André Charlot at the Vaudeville Theatre, the Strand, London; The Punch Bowl (1924), at the Duke of York's Theatre, London, with Alfred Lester, Billy Leonard, Sonnie Hale, Ralph Coram, Hermione Baddeley and Marjorie Spiers.

Alone, Farrar appeared in: the revue White Birds (His Majesty's Theatre, London, 1927), starring Maurice Chevalier, Anton Dolin, Billy Mayerl, José Collins and Maisie Gay; Wonder Bar (Savoy Theatre, London, 1930), a "musical play of night life"; After Dinner (Gaiety Theatre, London, 1932) which ran for only fifteen performances.

Together again, Blaney and Farrar appeared in The House that Jack Built (originally produced at the Adelphi Theatre, London, 1929) with Jack Hulbert and Cicely Courtneidge upon its transferral to the Winter Garden in 1930.

Farrar appeared also in three British films: She Shall Have Music (1935), with Jack Hylton; Beloved Imposter (1936), which featured the popular pianist Leslie Hutchinson; and Take a Chance (1937), with Binnie Hale, Claude Hulbert and Harry Tate.

== Personal life ==
At the time of her father's death, the Farrar family were living at Chicheley Hall, Buckinghamshire, which her father had rented from John G. Chester, whose family had owned the hall since the 1500s. The death of her father left Gwen a comfortable fortune which, in addition to her own earnings on stage, made her an independent woman. After her mother's death, some of her sisters continued to live as tenants at Chicheley Hall.

For a time she lived in Effingham, Surrey, with Blaney. She was friends with Radclyffe Hall, Joe Carstairs and their circle. She was romantically linked to actress Tallulah Bankhead when the latter was living in London.

She died after a short illness on 25 December 1944.

== Legacy ==
A 2014 play, All The Nice Girls by Alison Child and Rosie Wakley, tells the personal and professional partnership of Gwen Farrar and Norah Blaney. Child is also the author of Tell Me I'm Forgiven: The Story of Forgotten Stars Gwen Farrar and Norah Blaney.
