= Waveney Bicker Caarten =

English playwright (1902–1990)

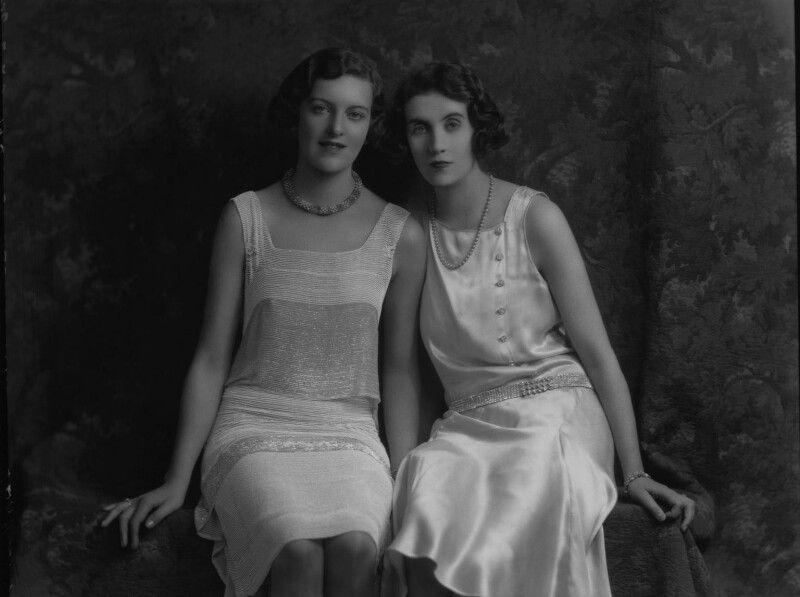
Waveney Hare Bicker-Caarten and Audrey Carten

Waveney Hare Bicker-Caarten (1902–1990) was an English playwright writing under the name of Waveney Carten in collaboration with her sister, Audrey Carten.

== Biography ==
Waveney Hare Bicker-Caarten was born in 1902 into a middle-class family in Blomfield Road, Maida Vale, London, the daughter of Catherine and Edwin Hare Bicker-Caarten. Among her siblings: Audrey Carten (1900-1977) and Kenneth Bicker Caarten (1911-1980).

At the end of the 1920s, Waveney and her sister Audrey wrote a number of successful plays such as Happy Families (1929) (cowritten also with Jane Ross, produced by Gerald du Maurier), Change of Heart (1929) (produced by Du Maurier), Fame (1929), Q, Late One Evening, Gay Love, Destination Unknown, Strawberry Leaves and two adaptations, Mademoiselle and My Crime. Beginning of the 1930s, Audrey Carten continued to write alone.

In 1932, Waveney Carten married Vladimir Provatoroff.
