= Norah Blaney =

British music hall performer (1893–1983)

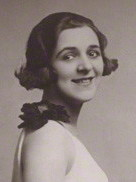
- Blaney in 1924
- Born: Norah Mignon Cordwell; 16 July 1893; 30 Godolphin Road, Shepherd's Bush, London, England
- Died: 7 December 1983 (aged 90); Denville Hall, Northwood, London, England
- Education: Royal College of Music
- Spouses: Albert Charles Lyne (m. 1914; died 1918); Philip Barron Bruce Durham (m. 1922; div. 1931); Basil Hughes (m. 1931; died 1953)
- Partner: Gwen Farrar

Norah Blaney (née Norah Mignon Cordwell; married names Lyne, Durham and Hughes; 16 July 1893 – 7 December 1983) was a British pianist, composer, comedienne and music hall performer. She recorded hundreds of songs between 1921 and 1935, many with her performing partner Gwen Farrar.

== Early life and education ==
Blaney was born Norah Mignon Cordwell on 16 July 1893 at 30 Godolphin Road in Shepherd's Bush, London to Walter Henry Cordwell (1864–1952), a bassoonist and founding principal of the New Symphony Orchestra, and Mary Jane "Molly" Blaney (née Thatcher; 1866–1962). An only child, Cordwell was baptised at St. Thomas Church in Fulham on 23 August 1893. (Note: Also cited as St Thomas of Canterbury Church.)

Awarded the Érard pianoforte scholarship in 1906, Cordwell enrolled at the Royal Academy of Music where she studied under Oscar Beringer. In 1910, Cordwell won a foundation scholarship to the Royal College of Music and adopted the surname "Blaney" after her maternal grandmother. Studying composition under Charles Villiers Stanford, Blaney was awarded the Dannreuther prize.

On 10 October 1914, Blaney married the pianist Albert Charles Lyne (1889–1918). Lyne enlisted in the London Scottish regiment in 1916, and later died of influenza in 1918 whilst serving in France.

== Career ==
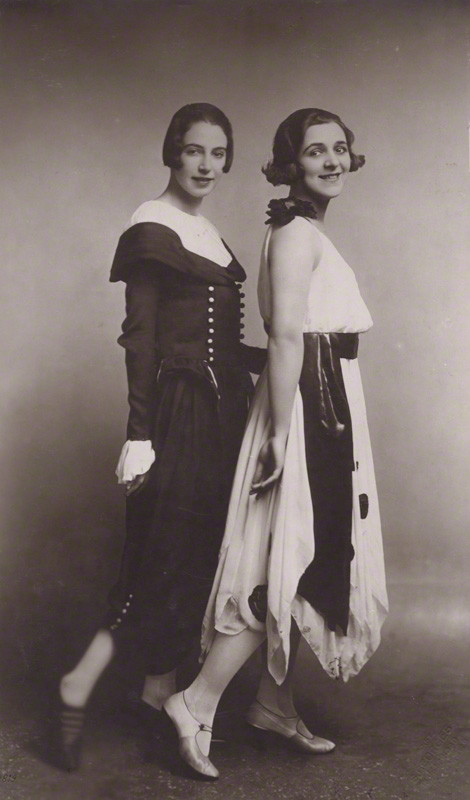
Gwen Farrar and Blaney, 1924

"Norah Blaney was the charm of the act, she wore frilly frocks, played the piano with roguish charm and sang like a demented nightingale"

— Description of Norah Blaney's act by Neville Phillips

Blaney and Farrar were both members of Lena Ashwell's group of entertainers for World War I soldiers in France, initially as classical artists. However, the pair started a ragtime duet, which gained popularity. They brought the act back to the UK and performed it in London Hippodrome regularly during 1921.

The pair lived together in Chelsea in 1917, remaining there until 1922. Blaney married for a second time, to Philip Barron Bruce Durham in 1922; they divorced in June 1931. Blaney and Farrar performed in Vaudeville Theatre productions around London. In 1925, they toured USA, including appearing on Broadway and in Palm Beach, Florida. However, in 1926, Farrar broke off their partnership, and Blaney returned to England.

Blaney and Farrar began working together again in 1930, but after she injured her foot while performing in 1931, Blaney married her surgeon, Basil Hughes on 20 February 1932.. She spent time in a nursing home recuperating from infection before retiring from performing generally, though she did the odd piece of work with Farrar.

Blaney died on 7 December 1983 at the actors' retirement home Denville Hall in Northwood, London.

== Legacy ==
Blaney and Farrar are considered "LGBT+ icons". In 2014, Alison Child and Rosie Wakley created a play called All the Nice Girls based on the relationship between Blaney and Farrar.
