= List of novels of Francis Brett Young =

The novels of Francis Brett Young entered the public domain on 1 January 2025, 70 full calendar years after Young's death on 28 March 1954, in accordance with UK copyright law.

== Works ==
=== Undergrowth (1913) ===
Undergrowth is co-written with his brother Eric. It marked the debut for Francis who was later to emerge as one of the most popular British writers of the interwar years. The story is based on the construction of the Elan Valley Reservoirs, a subject that he later returned to more successfully in The House Under the Water in 1932. Undergrowth was published in 1913 by Martin Secker.

Forsyth, a young English engineer travels to Wales to take over the construction of a dam, after the mysterious disappearance of his predecessor.

=== Deep Sea (1914) ===
Deep Sea is set in a West Country fishing town.

=== The Iron Age (1916) ===
The Iron Age was the first of Young's Mercian novels, focusing on a major industrial steelworks in the Stour Valley and the complex relationship between the firm's owners and their dynamic head engineer.

=== The Crescent Moon (1918) ===
The Crescent Moon was inspired by Brett Young's wartime service. It is set in German East Africa at the outbreak of the First World War.

=== The Young Physician (1919) ===
The Young Physician follows the schooldays and medical school years of a medical student, and his encountering of the social problems of the industrial city of North Bromwich.

=== The Tragic Bride (1920) ===
The Tragic Bride was written during the summer of 1919, while Young was on holiday in Brixham.

A young woman of the Anglo-Irish community in Connemara is neglected by her widowed father. On a visit to Dublin she falls in love with a young army officer, but this ends tragically. Entering into a loveless marriage with a schoolmaster she moves to Devon.

=== The Black Diamond (1921) ===
The Black Diamond concerns a coal miner and gifted part-time footballer who is given a job above ground by his boss. However, when he refuses to throw a cup match, he is dismissed. At the same time, his father accuses him of having an affair with his stepmother and kicks him out of the house.

=== The Red Knight (1921) ===
The Red Knight is about Robert Bryden, a young art student in Chelsea who befriends a communist revolutionary who then succeeds in launching a revolution in his Mediterranean homeland. Bryden travels out to assist him but quickly becomes disillusioned when the regime persecutes a woman he has fallen in love with.

=== Pilgrim's Rest (1922) ===
Pilgrim's Rest is named after the South African gold-mining town Pilgrim's Rest in the Drakensberg Mountains, where the plot takes place in 1913 amidst industrial unrest.

=== Cold Harbour (1924) ===
Cold Harbour takes place in Britain's Black Country in a supposedly haunted mansion on the site of an ancient Roman villa, whose owner Humphrey Furnival curtly dismisses any suggestion that it is cursed. The story is told from the point of view of a young couple, forced to take refuge there for the night after the car has a puncture.

=== Woodsmoke (1924) ===
Woodsmoke is an African-set novel. Young received a £424 advance from publishers Collins for the book. Like a number of his works it was inspired by his wartime service in the region.

An officer of the King's African Rifles is hired by a wealthy industrialist and his wife to take them on safari in German East Africa.

=== Far Forest (1936) ===
Far Forest was published in 1936. Set in a rural Midlands village, it is one of the author's many Mercian novels.

=== Portrait of a Village (1937) ===
Portrait of a Village was published in 1937. One of the author's Mercian novels, though without an overarching plot, it is set in the Worcestershire village of Monk's Norton, and describes the inhabitants of the village, their comfortable qualities and quirks; the Doctor bears some similarities to the author. The text is accompanied by a series of wood engravings by Joan Hassall.

=== They Seek a Country (1937) ===
They Seek a Country is a historical novel published in 1937. It was one of a number of novels with a South African setting by Young, who had served in the region during the First World War.

In the 1830s a young Englishman is sentenced to be transported to Australia for poaching. He manages to escape when the ship docks in South Africa, and befriends a local Boer family. He joins them in their plan to escape British rule and takes part in the Great Trek into the interior.

It was followed by a sequel The City of Gold published two years later.

=== Dr. Bradley Remembers (1938) ===
Dr. Bradley Remembers was published in 1938. Along with My Brother Jonathan it was one of only two of his later novels to take place in the Black Country, which had been a frequent setting in his earlier works.

After more than fifty years working as a doctor in a single industrial Midlands town, a Doctor looks back over his life.

=== The City of Gold (1939) ===
The City of Gold is a historical novel published in 1939. It is the sequel to the 1937 novel They Seek a Country.

If follows the tribulations of the Grafton family, established in the Transvaal Republic after taking part in the Great Trek more than thirty years earlier. It covers the major events from 1872 to 1896 including the South African gold rush, the founding of Johannesburg, and the Jameson Raid. The Graftons split into pro-Boer and pro-British factions, anticipating the Second Boer War. A number of historical figures such as Cecil Rhodes, Paul Kruger and Leander Jameson.

=== Mr. Lucton's Freedom (1940) ===
Mr. Lucton's Freedom is a 1940 novel. It is part of the author's "Mercian novels", set in the West Midlands and Welsh borders.

Owen Lucton is a partner of firm of accountants in the Midlands city of North Bromwich. Prosperous but bored, when his car crashes into the River Avon one day he decides it is a heaven-sent opportunity. Pretending he is dead, he assumes a new identity and begins walking through the Malvern Hills towards the Welsh border, finding a contentment in the countryside he had not in the city.

=== A Man About the House (1942) ===
A Man About the House was published in 1942. Two sisters living a life of genteel poverty in North Bromwich discover that they have inherited a villa near Capri from an uncle. In the warmth of the Italian climate they both flourish, but the presence of the villa's handyman provides a troubling note.

In 1946 Flora Robson and Basil Sydney appeared in a stage adaptation by John Perry at the Piccadilly Theatre in London.

In 1947 it was made into a film of the same title directed by Leslie Arliss and starring Dulcie Gray, Margaret Johnston and Kieron Moore.

=== The Island (1944) ===
The Island is an epic poem published in 1944 during the Second World War. It tells the story of Britain from the Bronze Age to the Battle of Britain.

=== In South Africa (1952) ===
In South Africa was published in 1952.

=== Wistanslow (1956) ===
The novel Wistanslow was published posthumously in 1956 following the author's death in 1954. It was unfinished, and edited for publication by Young's widow. Like many of his works, it is based on the author's youthful experiences, with a strong semi-autobiographical tone.

Around the turn of the century, the son of a doctor is invited by a friend to stay at Wistanslow, the palladian country house belonging to his friend's father Viscount Crowle. He finds the place very different than he had expected, and his sojourn is interrupted by a telegram announcing the illness of his own father.

== Gallery ==
1913

1914

1921

1922

1924

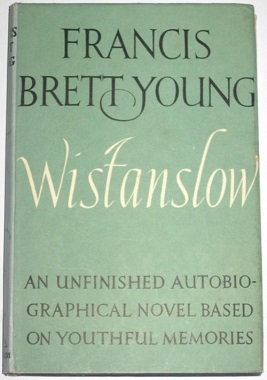
1956

== Works cited ==
- Cannadine, David (1982). This Little World: The Value of the Novels of Francis Brett Young as a Guide to the State of Midland Society, 1870-1925. Worcestershire Historical Society.
- Cannadine, David (2004). In Churchill's Shadow: Confronting the Past in Modern Britain. Oxford University Press. ISBN 019517156X.
- Birch, Dinah; Drabble, Margaret (24 September 2009). The Oxford Companion to English Literature. OUP Oxford. ISBN 978-0-19-280687-1. OCLC 758062441.
- Gaudi, Robert (2017). African Kaiser: Paul Von Lettow-Vorbeck and the Great War in Africa, 1914-1918. Hurst. ISBN 9781849048675.
- Goble, Alan (8 September 2011) [1999]. The Complete Index to Literary Sources in Film. Berlin: Walter de Gruyter. ISBN 978-3-11-095194-3. OCLC 1058328562.
- Hall, Michael (1997). Francis Brett Young. Border lines series. Seren. ISBN 978-1-85411-208-8. OCLC 247562754.
- Orel, Harold (1992). Popular Fiction in England, 1914-1918. University Press of Kentucky. ISBN 9780813117898.
- Ousby, Ian (23 February 1996). The Cambridge Paperback Guide to Literature in English. Cambridge University Press. ISBN 978-0-521-43627-4. OCLC 1114848466.
- Parker, Peter; Kermode, Frank (1995). The Reader's Companion to Twentieth-century Writers. Oxford: Fourth Estate. ISBN 978-1-85702-332-9. OCLC 34148963.
