= My Brother Jonathan =

My Brother Jonathan may refer to:

- My Brother Jonathan (film), a 1948 British film starring Michael Denison
- My Brother Jonathan (novel), the 1928 British novel that the film was based on
- My Brother Jonathan (TV series), a British television series from 1985, based on the novel

== See also ==
- Brother Jonathan (disambiguation)
