= Esthwaite Lodge =

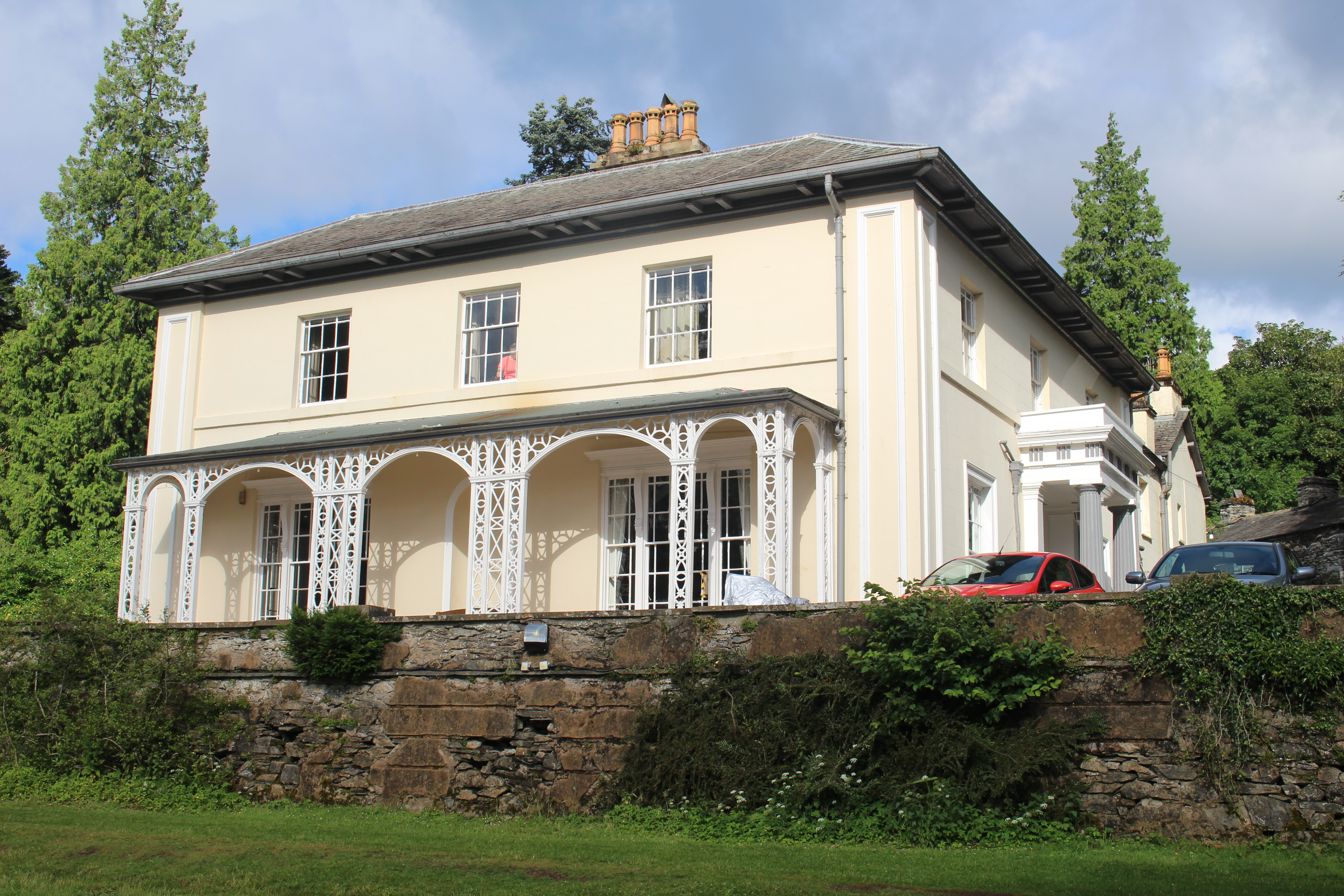

- Location within Cumbria
- 54°21′42″N 2°59′41″W
- Location: Hawkshead
- OS grid reference: SD354966

History
- Built: 1819–21
- Built for: Thomas Alcock Beck

Site notes
- Area: Cumbria, England
- Architect: George Webster

Listed Building – Grade II
- Designated: 22 September 1987
- Reference no.: 1323111

Esthwaite Lodge is a 19th-century house in Hawkshead, Cumbria, England; it is a Grade II listed building.

The house was commissioned by Thomas Alcock Beck, a local resident and antiquarian. He employed Kendal-based architect George Webster to design a property for him.

Webster's design was a stuccoed villa of two storeys and three bays with a slate hipped roof. Completed in 1821 the house is in the Neoclassical Greek Revival style a Doric porch was added.

Beck died in 1846 but his widow and his descendants continued to live in the house until the early 20th century. The 1911 census for England, however, records the property as being unoccupied.

Ownership of the house passed to the Brocklebank family who leased the house to a number of tenants. One of these, between 1929 and 1932 was the novelist Francis Brett Young until he decided that the weather was too wet for him.

With the outbreak of the Second World War the house was used for accommodating volunteers involved with the Hawkshead Afforestation Scheme and later members of the Women's Land Army.

In 1942 the house was purchased by Youth Hostels Association (England & Wales) and remains in use as a youth hostel.

== Owners and residents ==
Thomas Alcock Beck (1795–1846) who created Esthwaite Lodge was the son of James Beck. James owned a property called “the Grove” on the same site as the present Lodge and when he died in 1812 Thomas inherited the house. He had a spinal injury and used a wheelchair so in 1819 he built Esthwaite Lodge which according to the historian Henry Swainson Cowper had grounds which were specially laid out with easy gradients for his invalid chair. While he lived at the house he wrote a book called “Annales Furnesienses” on Furness Abbey which is still hailed as a masterpiece. He was a passionate historian and his library at the Lodge contained two thousand books.

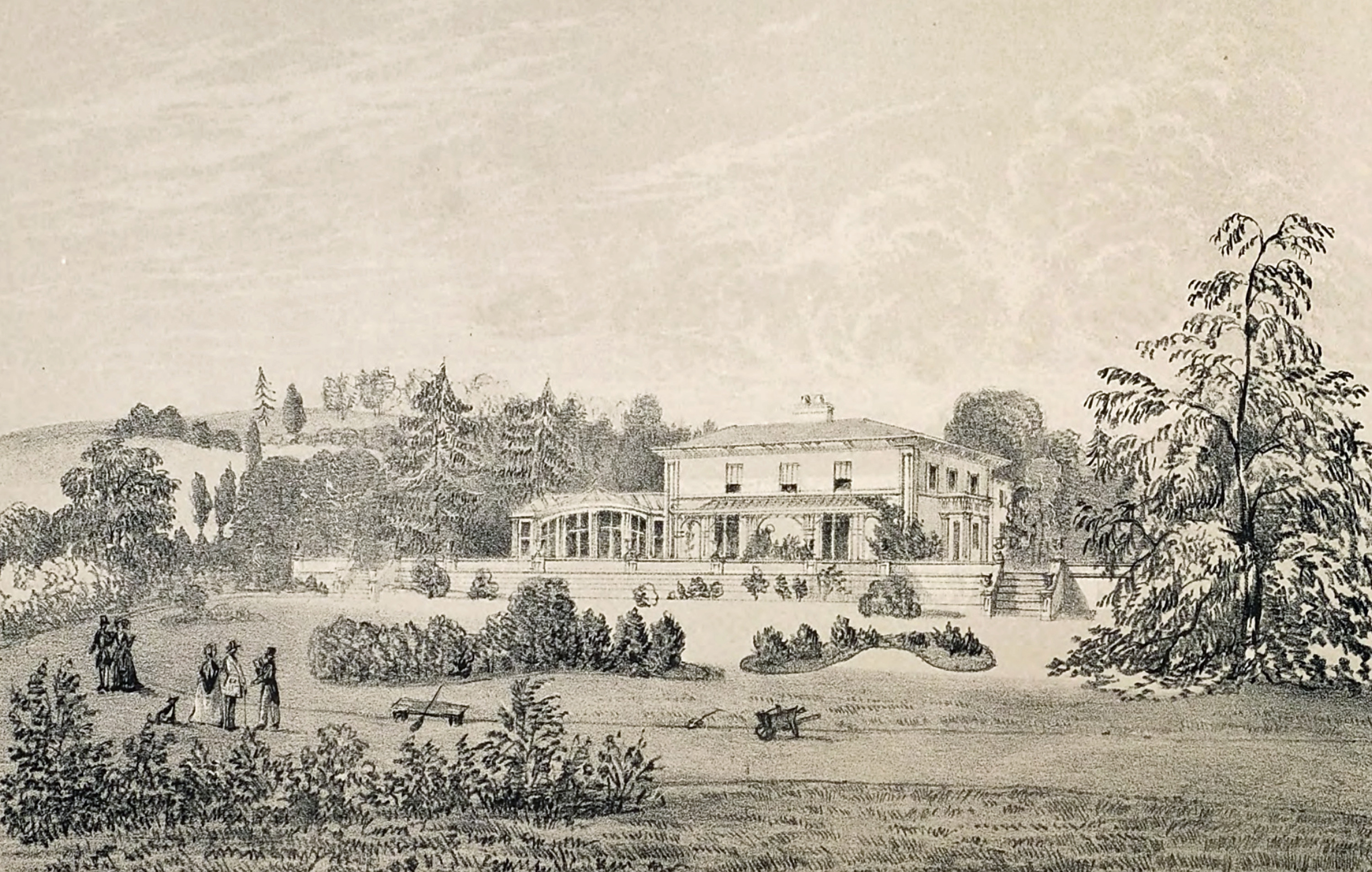
Engraving of Esthwaite Lodge in 1846

In 1838 at the age of 43 he married Elizabeth Fell (1799–1880) who was the daughter of William Fell of Ulverston and Martha Irton of Irton Hall. In 1847 a book was published called “the Mansions of England and Wales” which contained an engraving of Esthwaite Lodge and mentioned that it was a ‘handsome mansion which stands on the margin of the small but beautiful lake from which it takes its name.a The engraving is shown.

The couple had no children so when Thomas died in 1846 he left his property to a distant kinsman William Towers (1834–1911). This inheritance was conditional on his changing his name to William Alcock Beck. William was the son of William Towers (1799–1868) who owned Tower Bank House in Sawrey. In 1858 he married Ellen Alice Talbot (1837–1931) daughter of William Talbot of Lane House, Preston Patrick. William Alcock Beck was Chairman of the Hawkshead Petty Sessions Division and senior magistrate for Lancashire.

The couple had two daughters. One of them, Agnes Alcock Beck, was a long term personal friend of Beatrix Potter Both women were involved in community affairs. In 1919 when the Hawkshead area wished to have a district nurse the two women were elected as the representatives from Sawrey to the District Nursing Committee.

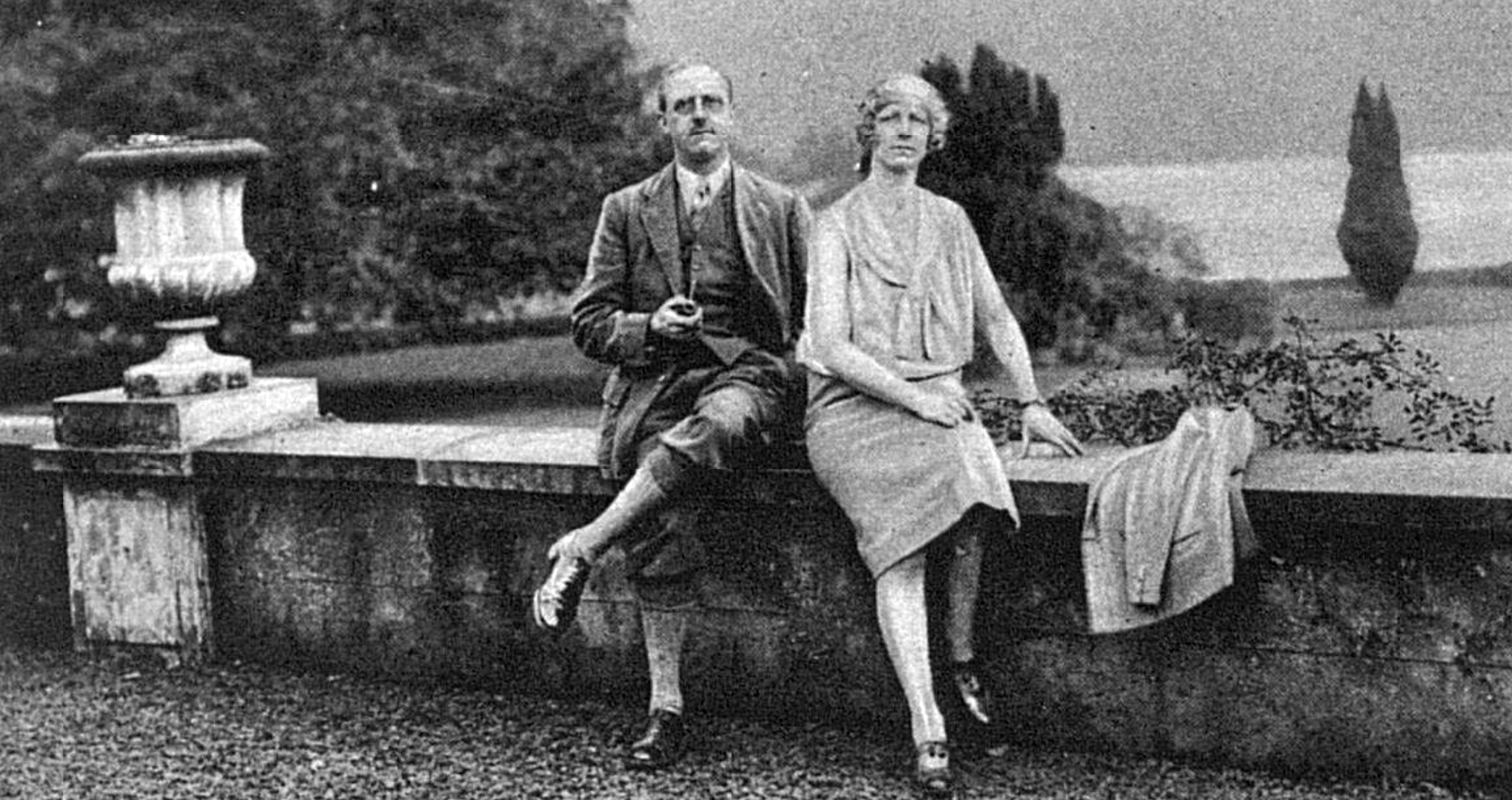
Francis Brett Young and his wife Jessie on the front wall of Esthwaite Lodge in 1931.

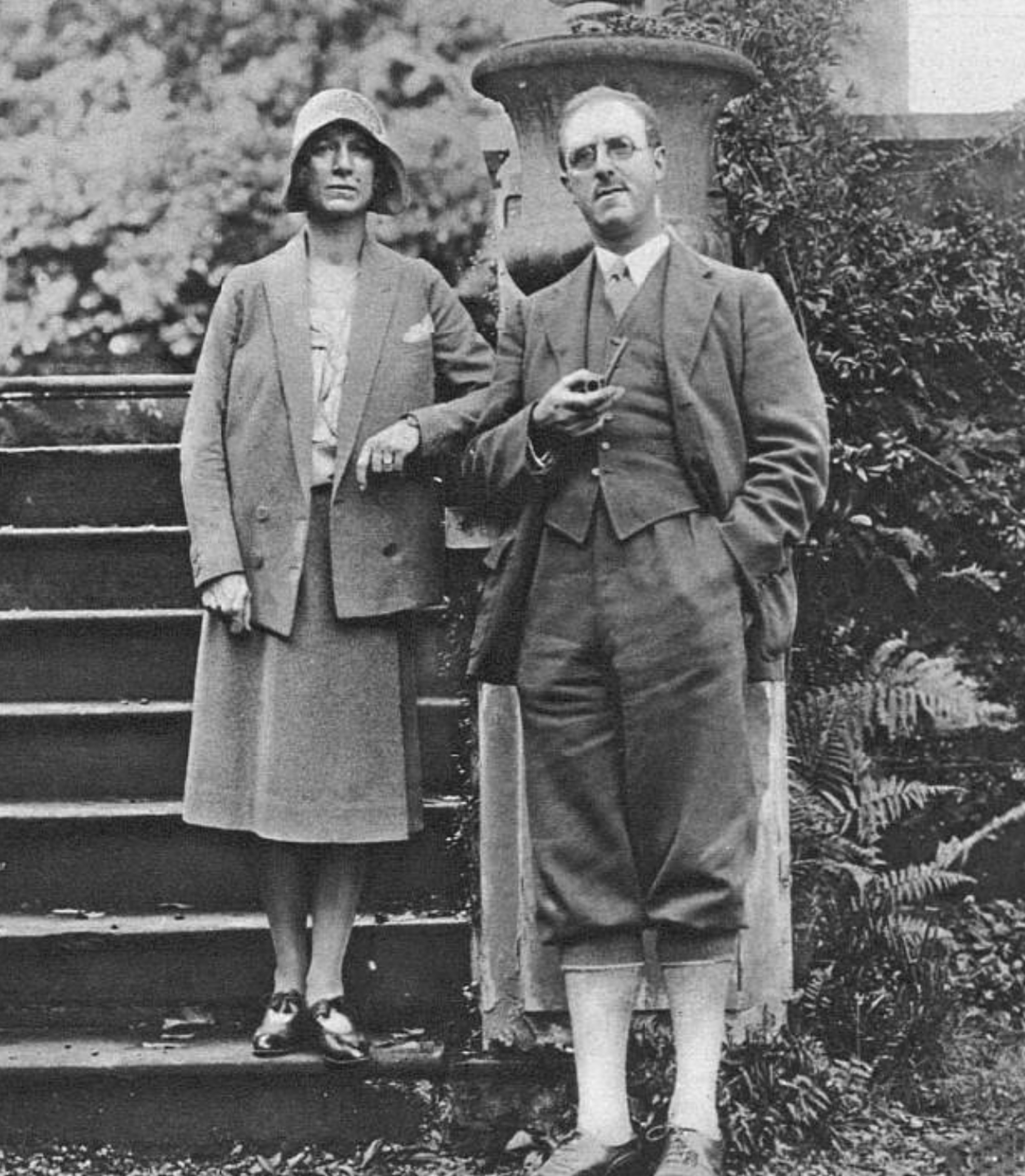
Francis Brett Young and his wife Jessie at the bottom of the front steps of Esthwaite Lodge in 1930

In 1904 William sold the Lodge to Harold Brocklebank a wealthy Liverpool merchant and shipping magnate. He had bought Grizedale Hall, Hawkshead in 1903 and had demolished it. He built a new grand building which was completed by 1907. It appears that he lived at Esthwaite Lodge during the Hall's construction and then moved to his new house and rented the Lodge to wealthy tenants.

The most famous of these was Francis Brett Young (1884–1954) and there is a plaque on the building commemorating his residence from 1929 to 1932. He was a famous author and poet. He commenced his career as a doctor but found it too stressful. In 1908 he married Jessica Hankinson (1883–1970) who was a concert singer. The couple had no children.

He decided to devote his life to literature and wrote many notable novels. In 1920 they went to live in Capri and became friendly with other famous authors of that time such as D. H. Lawrence. In 1929 he returned to England and rented Esthwaite Lodge. During the time he lived here he wrote “Black Roses”, "Jim Redlake" and "Mr. and Mrs. Pennington". The popular illustrated magazine called “the Sketch” visited the couple on two occasions during their residence at the Lodge and photographed them sitting on the front wall of the house and standing near the front steps. The photos are shown. The Grecian vases have since been removed but the pedestals on which they stood still remain.

Hugh Walpole, another famous novelist was a friend of the Youngs and often stayed at the Lodge. He wrote the novel “Judith Paris” while he was there. Other visitors were Edward Marsh, William Armstrong and Florence Hardy.

== See also ==
- Listed buildings in Hawkshead
