= A Man About the House (disambiguation) =

A Man About the House is a 1947 film directed by Leslie Arliss, based on the novel by Francis Brett Young.

A Man About the House may refer to:

- A Man About the House (novel), 1942 by Francis Brett Young
- A Man About the House (play), by John Perry based on the novel
- "A Man About the House", 1972 episode of Both Ends Meet
- "A Man About the House", pilot episode of Three's Company

== See also ==
- Man About the House, a British sitcom 1973 to 1976
  - Man About the House (film), 1974 spin-off from the British situation comedy of the same name
- Man of the House (disambiguation)
- A Man in the House, a 1940 film
