= Seahorse (disambiguation) =

A seahorse is a marine fish belonging to the genus Hippocampus.

Seahorse or seahorses may also refer to:

== Science and technology ==
- Hippopotamus, which was often called a seahorse in the mid-nineteenth century
- Seahorse (software), a GNOME front-end application for storing passwords and cryptographic keys

== Arts and entertainment ==
- Seahorse (2019 film), a British documentary film directed by Jeanie Finlay
- Seahorse (2026 film), a Canadian drama film directed by Aisha Evelyna
- The Seahorses, a British rock band
- Sea Horses (novel), a 1925 novel by Francis Brett Young
- Sea Horses (film), a 1926 American silent drama film, based on the novel
- The Sea Horse, a 1974 off-Broadway play by Edward J. Moore; see Royal Manitoba Theatre Centre production history
- "Seahorses", an episode of the television series Teletubbies
- Sea Horse Baian, a fictional character in the manga Saint Seiya (aka Knights of the Zodiac)
- Sea-Horse (folktale), a folktale from Syria

== Military ==
- USS Seahorse, several United States Navy ships
- HMS Seahorse, several Royal Navy ships
- F. F. E. Yeo-Thomas (1902–1964), S.O.E. operative had "SEAHORSE" as a code name during World War II
- Seahorse, various versions of the Sikorsky H-34 military helicopter
- Sea Horse, a merchant ship in the wrecking of the Sea Horse, Boadicea and Lord Melville in 1816

== Transport ==
- Seahorse (HBC vessel, 1734), operated by the HBC from 1734-1764, see Hudson's Bay Company vessels
- Seahorse (HBC vessel, 1765), operated by the HBC from 1765-1781, see Hudson's Bay Company vessels
- Seahorse (HBC vessel, 1782), operated by the HBC from 1782-1792, see Hudson's Bay Company vessels

== Other uses ==
- Hippocampus (mythology) or sea-horse, a mythological creature depicted as a horse in its forepart with a fish-like hindquarter
- King George V Seahorses, a set of British postage stamps
- Sea Horse (restaurant), a restaurant in Helsinki, Finland
- Sea Horse Hotel, a pub in York, England

== See also ==
- Walrus
- Battle of Mount Austen, the Galloping Horse, and the Sea Horse, an engagement between United States and Imperial Japanese forces
- Water horse, any of several mythical creatures
