= Portrait of Clare =

Portrait of Clare refers to:

- Portrait of Clare (novel), 1927 novel by Francis Brett Young
- Portrait of Clare (film), 1950 British film based on the novel
