= Leslie Landau =

British film producer (1904–1977)

- Born: 28 November 1904; Fulham, London, England
- Died: 1977 (aged 72–73); Westminster, England
- Education: Cheltenham College
- Occupations: Director; film producer; screenwriter; screenplay editor; playwright
- Spouse: Effie Atherton

Leslie Lesser Landau (28 November 1904 – 1977) was a British director, film producer, screenwriter, screenplay editor and playwright. He also served as the newsreel editor of British Movietone News from 1929 to 1935 at a time the power of newsreel from a political perspective was first used. He was honoured for landmark film journalism.

== Early life ==
Born in Fulham, London, on 28 November 1904, the son of Morris Marks Landau and Rose Bertha Friedlander, the daughter of Henry Lesser Friedlander, a manufacturing agent from Gunnersbury, London. His father was a British financier with interests in South Africa and the United States.

He was educated at Cheltenham College, before studying finance in Darmstadt. He returned to London in 1923, to join a private banking house in the City of London, however soon after accepted an offer to study the film business with Fox Film.

== Career ==
Whilst at Fox, Landau became involved with film editing and was promoted to the position of newsreel editor, eventually becoming a documentary director in 1934. His film career took a change of direction, with him entering into British cinema; his passion being the crime and mystery genre.

Landau's career in Fox Film had started in London in 1923. However he was soon chosen to participate in newsreel projects both at home and overseas, recording key newsworthy events. He travelled extensively within Europe, and throughout South Africa, Australia and New Zealand between 1923 and 1929. He transferred to British Fox Movietone News, a Fox Film subsidiary at its inception in 1929.

On 18 August 1930, the G.B. Movietone and News Theatre, the first news cinema in the UK opened its doors, with Landau, at the age of 25, as its first manager. Locally these establishments were referred to as newsreel theatre's. The venue was located at the Pavilion, 101 Shaftesbury Avenue, Piccadilly. Landau had been granted permission to re-edit the standard newsreel releases.

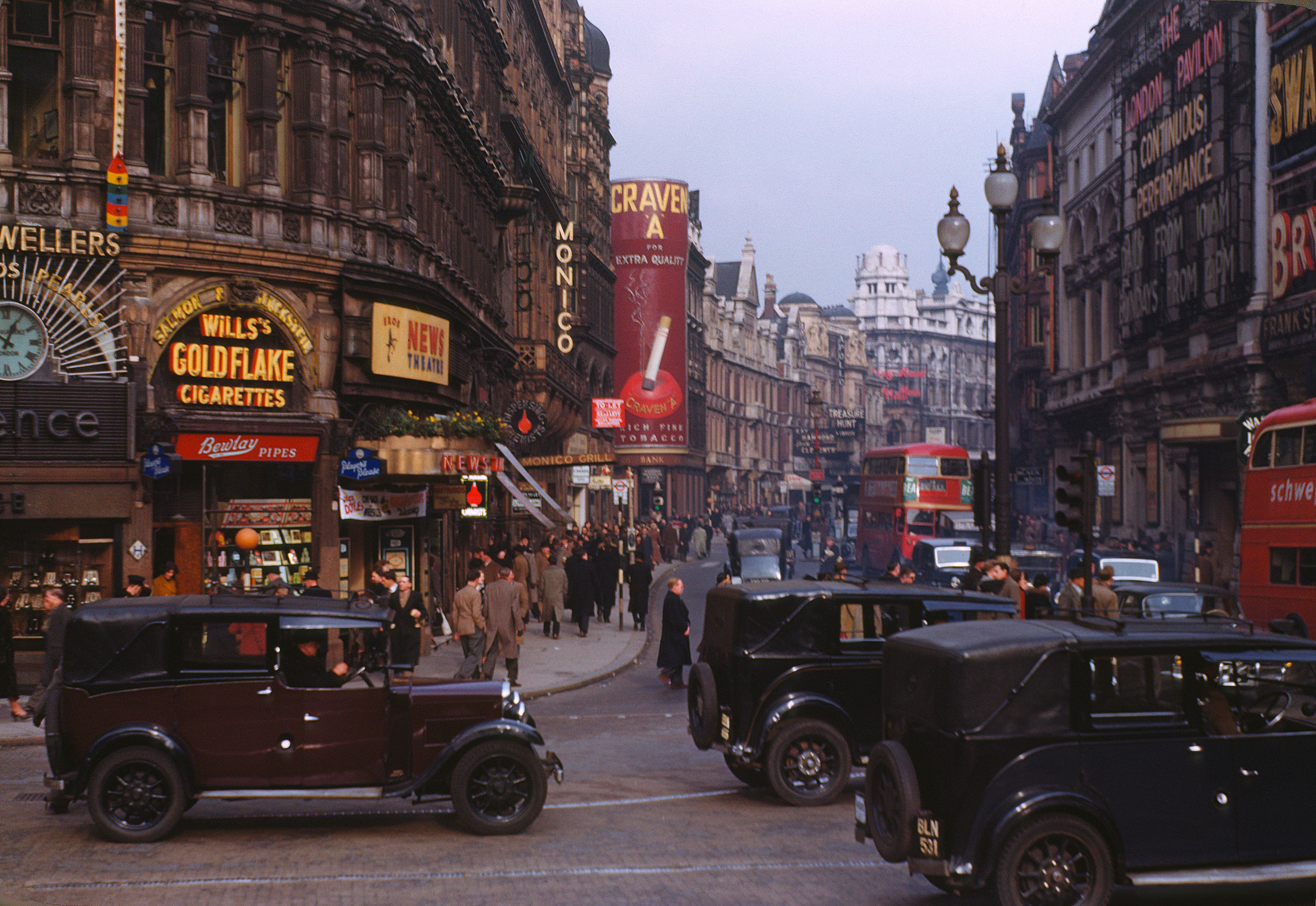
A view from Piccadilly Circus in 1949: on the left Eros News Theatre. On the right the London Pavilion has a "continuous performance".

His next role in Movietone was as news editor, followed by associate editor, reporting to Gerald Sanger from 1931. It was a time when censorship did not exist and presentation of politics on film was becoming a new influential medium of communication with voters. In the run up to the 1931 UK election he advised Ramsay MacDonald, to make a final last word to the electorate, explaining the propaganda benefits of film.

In 1934 he worked with Vernon Bartlett to produce Europe Today. Europe Today won significant critical attention, and has been described as an impressive film in Sight & Sound with honors such as "a landmark in film journalism" in Vol. 3, 1934 (p34-35). Europe Today now forms part of the BFI National Archive. It would have been a challenging time for Landau, being of Jewish origin, working within the British media, whose owners were either appeasers of sympathetic to gradual changes in Germany and the erosion of civil rights of his friends and relatives in continental Europe.

Such was his notability in London, that he was chosen by staff at Buckingham Palace to promote the life of the reigning monarch. Episodes of the life of King George V were sanctioned by Buckingham Palace to be edited by Landau to commemorate his 68th birthday. This time Landau directed, whilst Sanger produced and John Drinkwater narrated.

Fox Film ventured into British cinema, shortly before its merger with Twentieth Century Pictures, which presented an opportunity for Landau to leave newsreel behind and pursue his interest as a screenwriter. Fox Film appointed Landau to lead with the screenplay of The Riverside Murder. There would be no return to newsreel, and a new life chapter had begun. He began dating actresses and grew fond of Effie Atherton who he later married. Landau went on to produce a number of films between 1935 and 1950. He worked with directors such as Lance Comfort, Albert Parker, Bernard Vorhaus, Harold French, Michael Powell, Alex Bryce, Campbell Gullan, Eugene Forde, and producers such as Warwick Ward.

Landau spent the late 1930s in Hollywood as a producer for the Twentieth Century-Fox Film Corporation. He returned to England a few months before the outbreak of World War II with his wife, who had previously embarked on a radio tour of the United States. Back in London, he worked on propaganda fare during the World War II. He subsequently joined Associated British Picture Corporation and worked as one of their film producers from 1947 to 1950.

In German sources, he has been associated with the release of a Harold French film, first aired in Germany in 1949 under the title of Strong Hearts. This is likely due to Landau's command of the German language. The original UK title of the film is unknown.

His genre as a writer, was crime and mystery. His plays included Variations on a Theme in a Flat in 1934. His play Portrait of Hickory debuted in 1948 at the Embassy Theatre in London and was also broadcast on the BBC. It was co-written with the Oxford-born novelist Adrian Alington. In 1954 his play Inquest for a Hero, also co-written with Adrian Alington and produced by Henry Clayton, aired twice on the BBC.

He is also credited as a producer of BBC Sunday-Night Theatre, consisting of a selection of television plays performed live. The series ran from 1950 to 1959.

== Personal life ==
He married Effie Atherton, a British singer, dancer, film actress, and musical comedy performer, who moved into prime time musical shows on British radio in the 1930s. They had three children: Penelope, Michael, and Caroline.

Landau died in Westminster in 1977. His death is registered under the name "Landeau".

== Filmography ==
Year	Film	Credit	Notes
1934	The King, God Bless Him	Director	A U.S. production written and narrated by John Drinkwater. Alternative names King George V and The First Film Biography of King George V
1935	The Riverside Murder	Unit producer	The screenplay was written by Selwyn Jepson based on the novel by Stanislas-André Steeman. The film is in the public domain.
1935	Dark World	Executive producer	Produced and written. This is now considered a lost film.
1935	The Love Test	Executive producer	Some sources have referred to it as The Love Nest.
1936	Wedding Group	Executive producer	Released in the US under the title Wrath of Jealousy.
1937	The Lady Escapes	Executive producer	Based on a play by the Hungarian novelist Jenö Heltai.
1948	My Brother Jonathan	Writer / screenplay	Co-written with Adrian Alington from the novel by Francis Brett Young.
1950	Portrait of Clare	Executive producer, Writer	Co-written with Adrian Alington from the novel by Francis Brett Young

== Television ==
Year	TV Production	Credit	Notes
1954	Inquest on a Hero	Script	

== Ancestry ==
His paternal ancestors changed their name from Brajtsztajn to Landau. Both his paternal and maternal ancestors observed the Jewish faith. His paternal grandfather lived in what is today known as Piątek, Łódź Voivodeship, a village in central Poland, and relocated with his wife and newborn son (Landau's father) to Dublin in the 1870s.

His father, accompanied by a younger brother journeyed to Southern Africa in the 19th century; and after a series of successful enterprises became general traders north of the Limpopo River, having first established a presence in Bulawayo. His father, once he became a successful businessman, choose to relocate to London, where Landau and his siblings were born. His father, who retained interests in South Africa, subsequently emigrated to California with Landau's American born stepmother, Evelyn Stark, and his half siblings in 1937.
