= This Little World =

1934 novel

- First US edition
- Author: Francis Brett Young
- Language: English
- Genre: Drama
- Publisher: Heinemann (UK); Harper & Brothers (US)
- Publication date: 1934
- Media type: Print

This Little World is a 1934 novel by the British writer Francis Brett Young. It is set in a Worcestershire village in the early 1920s, where the recent First World War presages social change. It has a number of similarities with another of his books of the period Portrait of a Village, published three years later.

== Bibliography ==
- Cannadine, David. In Churchill's Shadow: Confronting the Past in Modern Britain. Oxford University Press, 2004.
