= White Ladies =

A White Lady is a type of female ghost. It may also refer to:

- White Ladies (novel), 1935 novel by Francis Brett Young
