= Hannah Washington =

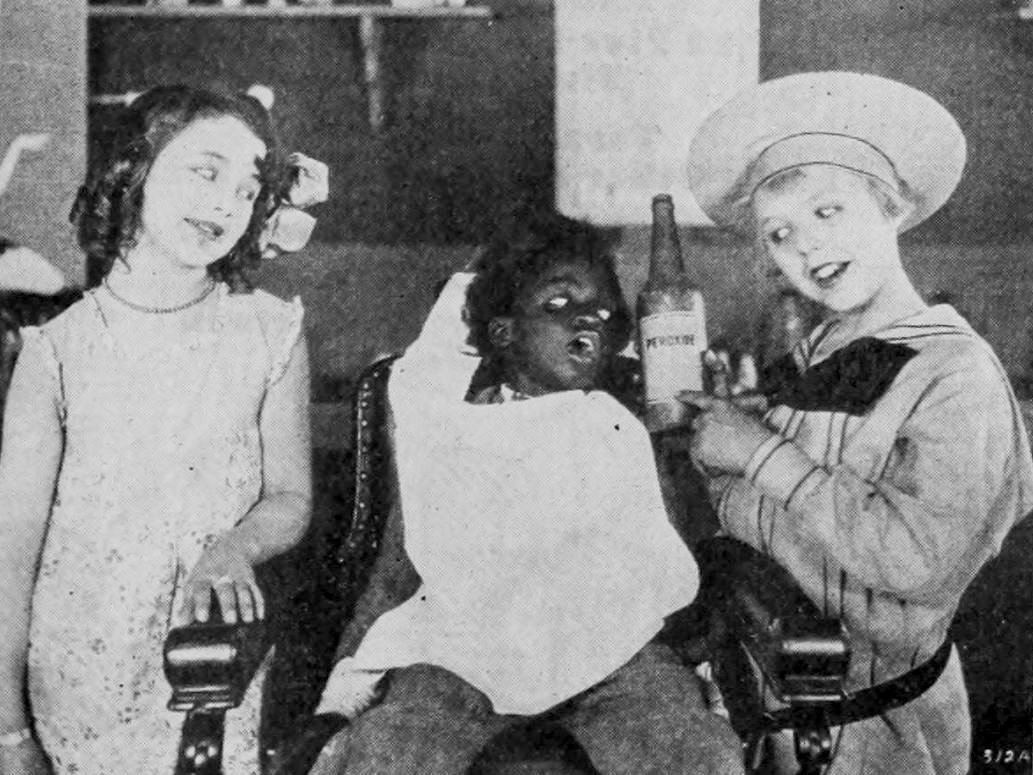
- Still from Buster Trims Up (1928)
- Born: Hannah C. Washington; October 6, 1923; Los Angeles, California, USA
- Died: January 15, 1990 (aged 66); Los Angeles, California, USA
- Occupation: Child actor
- Relatives: Mildred Washington (aunt)

Hannah Washington was a former child actor who was active in Hollywood during the 1920s and 1930s. A fixture in short comedies — often as a character named Oatmeal — she was one of the few Black child actors in movies at the time. She also had roles in 1927's Uncle Tom's Cabin, 1933's King Kong, and 1935's The Littlest Rebel, where she appeared alongside Shirley Temple.

== Biography ==
Hannah was born in Los Angeles, California, to Robert Washington and Fannie Ford; her aunt was actress and dancer Mildred Washington. Her first known on-screen appearance was in 1926's Sea Horses; her parents were also extras on several of her older films. She was signed as a toddler by Sunset Studios in 1927 to a contract to appear in comedies. She appears to have returned from acting around 1935; she later married and had a son. She died in 1990 in Los Angeles.

== Select filmography ==
- Sea Horses (1926)
- Luke Warm Daze (1926)
- The Notorious Lady (1927)
- Big Pie Raid (1927)
- The Deuce (1927)
- Animal Catchers (1927)
- The Orphans (1927)
- Spooks (1927)
- Uncle Tom's Cabin (1927)
- Fowl Play (1928)
- Bathing Beauty Babies (1928)
- Kids, Cats and Cops (1928)
- A Gallant Gob (1928)
- Busting Buster (1928)
- Mickey's Movies (1928)
- Buster Trims Up (1928)
- Knockout Buster (1929)
- King Kong (1933)
- The Littlest Rebel (1935)
