= The Shopworn Angel (1928 film) =

1928 film

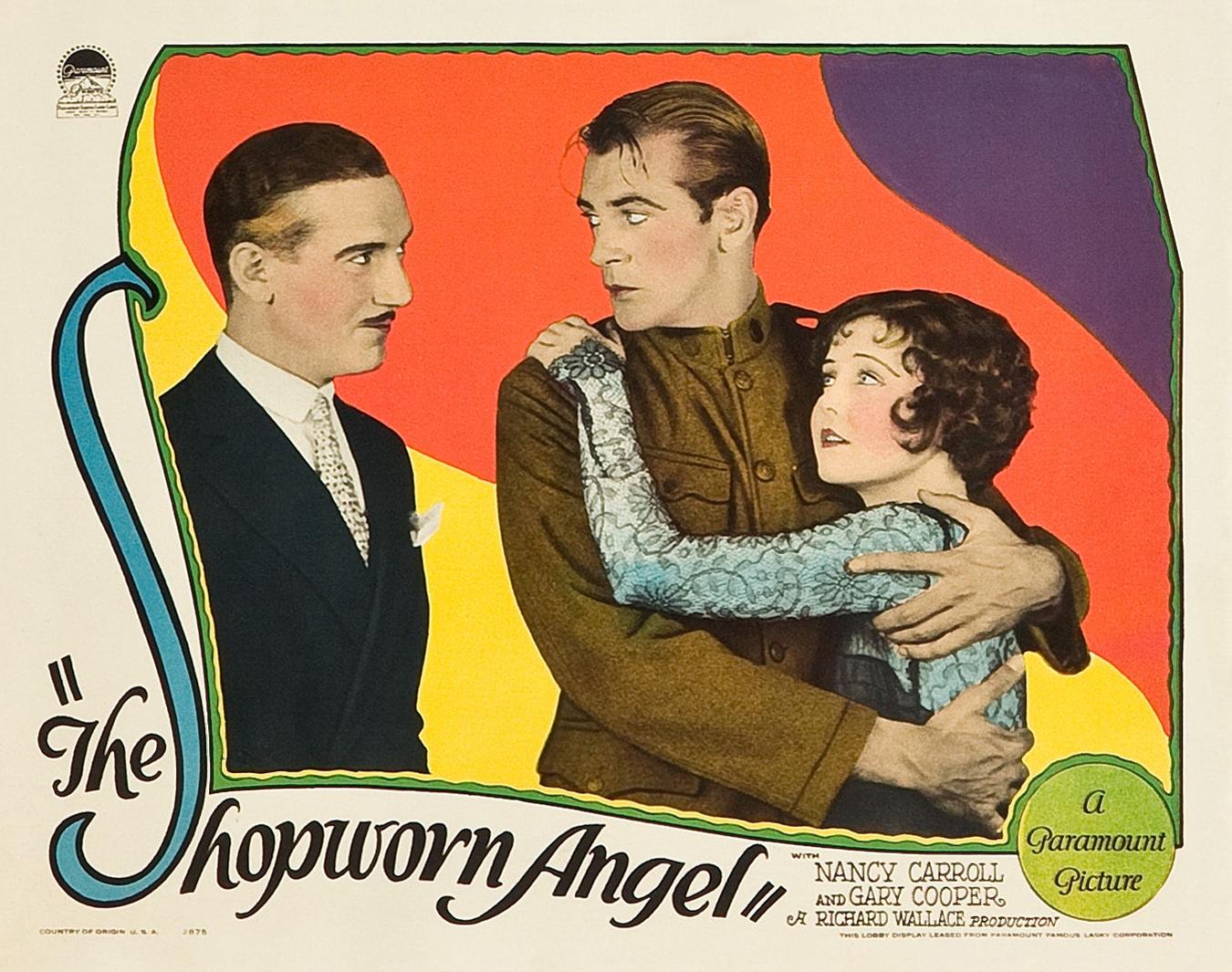
- Theatrical release poster
- Directed by: Richard Wallace
- Screenplay by: Howard Estabrook; Albert S. LeVino; Tom Miranda (intertitles)
- Based on: Private Pettigrew's Girl; 1918 story in The Saturday Evening Post by Dana Burnet
- Starring: Nancy Carroll; Gary Cooper
- Cinematography: Charles Lang
- Edited by: Robert Gessler
- Music by: Ben Bergunker; Andrea Setaro
- Production company: Paramount Pictures
- Distributed by: Paramount Pictures
- Release dates: December 29, 1928 (New York City); January 12, 1929 (U.S.)
- Running time: 80 minutes (8 reels); 7,377 feet (Sound Version); 7,112 feet (Silent Version)
- Country: United States
- Language: Sound (Part-talkie) English intertitles

The Shopworn Angel is a 1928 American part-talkie sound romantic drama film directed by Richard Wallace starring Nancy Carroll and Gary Cooper. The film was released by Paramount Pictures using the Western Electric sound-on-film system. Like the majority of films in the early sound era, a silent version was made for theatres who hadn't converted to sound yet by trimming down the portions of the film that featured talking or singing.

== Plot ==
America is on the brink of war, and military cantonments begin to fill with young soldiers whose patriotism is mingled with anxiety and fear. One such soldier is Private William Tyler, a gentle and sincere Texan who arrives in New York as the city beats with patriotic fervor. A military parade awakens Daisy Heath, a jaded, elegant Broadway chorus girl, from her slumber—more irritated than inspired by the noise.

That night on bustling Broadway, a comic traffic mishap brings the innocent Tyler into fleeting contact with Daisy. Starstruck, he boasts to his fellow soldiers that she is his girl. When they plan to embarrass him by calling his bluff, Daisy impulsively plays along, rescuing him from humiliation.

Intrigued by Tyler's unworldly sincerity and gallant manner, Daisy begins to see him more often. His simple devotion and unshakeable idealism contrast sharply with the sophisticated, cynical men she is used to—particularly Bailey, her wealthy benefactor and lover. To Tyler, Daisy is a vision of purity and grace, and he remains blissfully unaware of her worldly life and her dependence on Bailey's financial support.

Bailey, perceptive and possessive, recognizes the danger that Tyler's love presents. Calmly but firmly, he persuades Daisy that Tyler is in love not with her true self but with a fantasy—one she has allowed him to believe. He convinces her that any future with the young soldier would end in disappointment and heartbreak. Sobered by this, Daisy resolves to end things and stay with Bailey.

But everything changes when Tyler's company is suddenly ordered to deploy for France. Desperate, in love, and afraid, Tyler goes AWOL and runs to Daisy, begging to see her one last time. Moved by his devotion and filled with remorse, Daisy spends the day with him. It is a transformative moment. Daisy finds the courage to cast off her old life. She leaves Bailey for good and promises to marry Tyler.

As they prepare to wed, Tyler stands proud in his uniform, while Daisy is overwhelmed by her emotions. At the altar, she collapses in a faint, and the ceremony is never completed. Before she can recover, Tyler is pulled away—his regiment is sailing. He leaves without a wife but full of hope, inspired by Daisy's love and belief in him.

In the aftermath, Daisy withdraws from her former glittering life. She refuses to return to Bailey, endures hardship, and finds a humble job in a theater. During a quiet rehearsal, guided by the brusque Dance Director, she practices a song-and-dance routine. As she sings, her eyes well with tears—her thoughts drifting across the ocean to Tyler, now at war in France. Though apart, Daisy feels spiritually bound to him, her love no longer a fragile illusion but something deeply real.

== Cast ==
- Nancy Carroll as Daisy Heath
- Gary Cooper as William Tyler
- Paul Lukas as Bailey
- Roscoe Karns as the Dance Director
- Emmett King as The Chaplain
- Mildred Washington as Daisy's Maid
- Bert Woodruff in a bit part (uncredited)

== Music ==
The film's theme song, "A Precious Little Thing Called Love," was composed by Lou Davis and J Fred Coots. It is sung by Nancy Carroll in the film.

== Sound ==
This film was nearing completion when The Jazz Singer (1927) was released. Dialogue was written for Gary Cooper and Nancy Carroll to compete with "talking pictures". The last scene was a wedding and the only lines of dialogue spoken in the film are Cooper's "I do" and Carroll's "I do". In addition, Carroll is also heard singing the theme song.

== Preservation status ==
This film survives apart from reels 7 & 8 at the Library of Congress. The soundtrack is completely lost.

== See also ==
- List of early sound feature films (1926–1929)
