= Marching on Tanga =

- 1938 Collins edition
- Author: Francis Brett Young
- Language: English
- Genre: War Memoir
- Publisher: Collins (UK); E. P. Dutton (US)
- Publication date: 1917
- Media type: Print

Marching on Tanga is a 1917 non-fiction work by the British writer Francis Brett Young. A war memoir, it recounted his service in the Royal Army Medical Corps during the East African campaign of the First World War. Passages of the book were censored at the time, but later re-used in his novel Jim Redlake. Several of Young's novels were set in German East Africa.

The book sold well and was republished several times. It has been described as "an outstandingly vivid account of campaigns in East Africa", while acknowledging that the fighting there was a sideshow compared to the better-known European conflict.

== Bibliography ==
- Michael Hall. Francis Brett Young. Seren, 1997.
- Randall Stevenson. Literature and the Great War 1914-1918. 2 May 2013
