= Sea Horses (film) =

1926 film

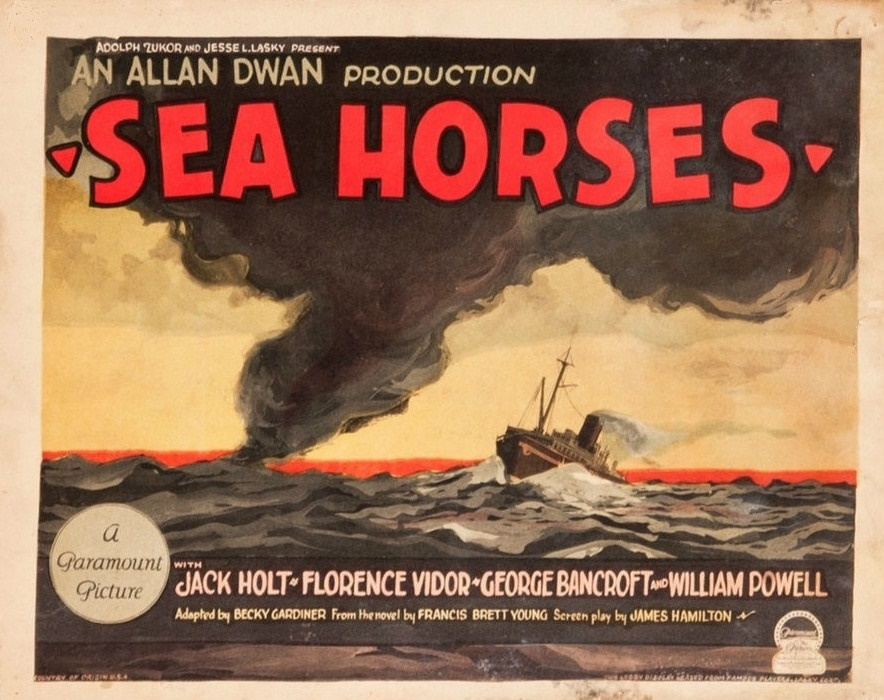
- Lobby card
- Directed by: Allan Dwan
- Screenplay by: Becky Gardiner; James Shelley Hamilton
- Based on: Sea Horses by Francis Brett Young
- Produced by: Jesse L. Lasky; Adolph Zukor
- Starring: Jack Holt; Florence Vidor; William Powell; George Bancroft; Mack Swain; Frank Campeau; Allan Simpson
- Cinematography: James Wong Howe
- Production company: Famous Players–Lasky Corporation
- Distributed by: Paramount Pictures
- Release date: February 22, 1926
- Running time: 70 minutes
- Country: United States
- Language: Silent (English intertitles)

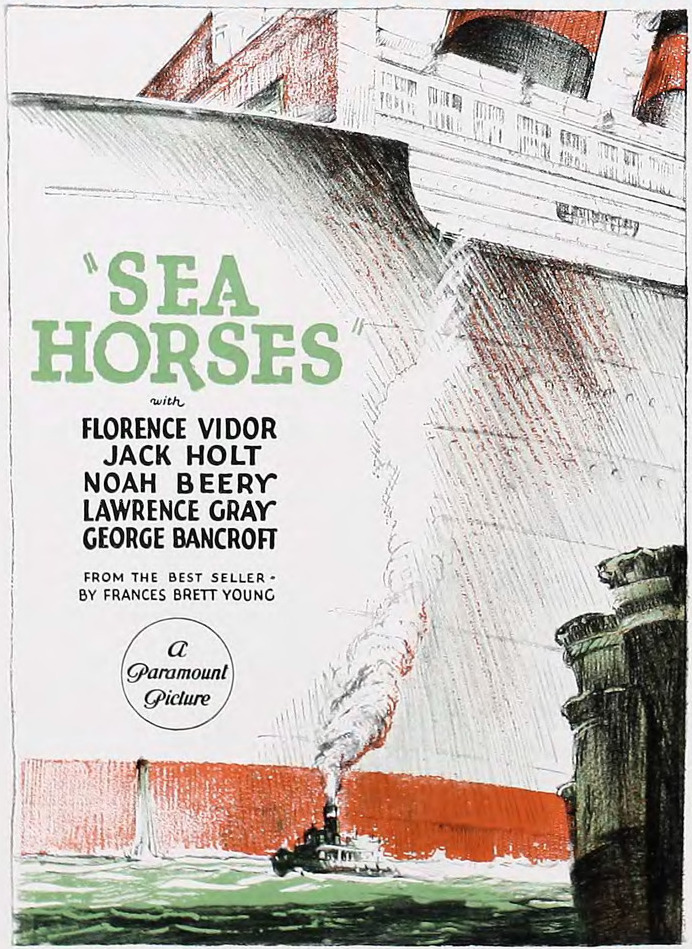
Sea Horses 1925 film advertisement

Sea Horses is a 1926 American silent drama film directed by Allan Dwan and written by Becky Gardiner, James Shelley Hamilton, and Francis Brett Young. The film stars Jack Holt, Florence Vidor, William Powell, George Bancroft, Mack Swain, Frank Campeau, and Allan Simpson. The film was released on February 22, 1926, by Paramount Pictures. It is based on the 1925 novel of the same title by British writer Francis Brett Young.

== Plot ==
As described in a film magazine review, a young American captain aids a beautiful young English woman to find her Italian husband, who has abandoned her and her child, in an evil African port. Her efforts at reconciliation refused, she returns to the captain, who loves her. The child is kidnapped by the father. There is a terrific fight. The captain and the mother and child escape, and the dissolute husband is wiped out in a tropical storm.

== Cast ==
- Jack Holt as George Glanville
- Florence Vidor as Helen Salvia
- William Powell as Lorenzo Salvia
- George Bancroft as Cochran
- Mack Swain as Bimbo-Bomba
- Frank Campeau as Senor Cordoza
- Allan Simpson as Harvey
- George Nichols as Marx
- Mary Dow as Cina Salvia
- Dick La Reno as Henry
- Frank Austin as Cheadle
- Hannah Washington as Child

== Preservation ==
With no prints of Sea Horses located in any film archives, it is a lost film.
