= Words and Music (Noël Coward) =

Musical revue by Noël Coward

- Romney Brent sings "Mad Dogs and Englishmen"
- Music: Noël Coward
- Lyrics: Noël Coward
- Book: Noël Coward
- Productions: 1932 West End

Words and Music is a musical revue with sketches, music, lyrics and direction by Noël Coward. The revue introduced the song "Mad About the Boy", which, according to The Noël Coward Society's website, is Coward's most popular song. The critics praised the show's sharp satire and verbal cleverness.

== History and reception ==
Words and Music opened in London at the Adelphi Theatre on 16 September 1932, after a Manchester Opera House tryout in August 1932. It consisted of a series of sketches, some with songs, and starred Ivy St. Helier, Joyce Barbour, John Mills, Romney Brent, Doris Hare, Moya Nugent and Effie Atherton and, in a small part, Graham Payn. It ran for 164 performances, short of the two years Coward had expected, closing on 4 February 1933.

The Manchester Guardian wrote of the show,

"Mr. Coward has never sharpened his quill to better purpose than here. In many of the numbers his neatly polished libretto has more than mere verbal ingenuity, and his musical score, though by this time its conventions are familiar, shows a wide and diverting range both in parody and in construction... an acid Anglo-Indian scene with a chorus of sahibs declaiming that 'no matter how much we sozzle and souse, the sun never sets upon Government House', leads to a swinging mock-heroic number with the refrain 'But mad dogs and Englishmen go out in the midday sun' that has a true Gilbertian flavour."

The Times wrote, "Mr. Coward has the gift of attack... he had the audience cheering before the opening chorus was spent.... Mr. Coward has, above all else, the gift of satire, and this revue, being primarily satirical, is his best work in the musical kind... the active fierceness which is the distinction between genuine satire and empty sneering." The paper thought "Something to do with Spring" the only failure in the show, praised "Mad About the Boy", "Midnight Matinée" and the parodies of Casanova and Journey's End, and was undecided about "Let's Say Goodbye." It praised the performances of St Helier, Brent, Hare, Barbour, Steffi Duna and Nora Howard. The Daily Mirror commented, Words and Music "bears the stamp of genius.... 'Mad Dogs and Englishmen' is another song that goes with such snap and sparkle that it is bound to be heard wherever there are gramophones and pianos.... Words and Music has nothing in common with the average revue. Mr Coward, indeed, lifts it far above the ordinary".

Coward later said of the show, "Words and Music was almost a very good revue, but it wasn't quite. I've never quite made up my mind why. It could possibly have been my fault. But it wasn't entirely. It had no great big star in it, though there was a wonderful cast."

The show was revised and opened on Broadway in 1939 with the title Set to Music.

In 2013 Lost Musicals presented the show in concert at the intimate Lilian Baylis Studio of Sadler's Wells Theatre in London. Ian Marshall Fisher directed the production, which was Lost Musicals' first and only British show, as Fisher found that he was unable to reconstruct the American version, Set to Music. The cast included Issy van Randwyck.

== Sketches ==
One sketch was titled "Journey's End", and was a parody of the R. C. Sherriff play of the same name. It "camps up carnage...balloons being flung onto the stage...and the orchestra playing Deutschland über Alles. Another sketch, singled out for praise by both The Manchester Guardian and The Daily Mirror, was "Children's Hour" in which Coward satirised the pretensions of adults by putting their high-flown remarks into the mouths of children. The sketch ended with the song "Let’s Live Dangerously", "a merry little skit on present day habits"

== Songs ==
(In the order printed in The Lyrics of Noël Coward, pp. 114–18):

- Maggie (opening chorus)
- Débutantes
- Let's Live Dangerously
- Children of the Ritz
- Mad Dogs and Englishmen
- Planters' Wives
- Let's Say Good-bye
- The Hall of Fame
- Mad About the Boy
- Journey's End
- Housemaids' Knees
- Three White Feathers
- Description of Ballets
- Something to Do With Spring
- The Wife of an Acrobat
- The Younger Generation
- Midnight Matinée
- The Party's Over Now

The Noël Coward Society's website, drawing on performing statistics from the publishers and the Performing Rights Society, names "Mad About the Boy" as Coward's most popular song. "Mad Dogs and Englishmen" is also among the top ten most performed Coward songs. "The Party's Over Now" ranks in the top thirty of Coward songs.
