= A Man About the House (novel) =

Novel by Francis Brett Young

- American first edition
- Author: Francis Brett Young
- Language: English
- Genre: Drama
- Publisher: Heinemann (UK); Reynal & Hitchcock (US)
- Publication date: 1942
- Media type: Print

A Man About the House is a 1942 novel by the British writer Francis Brett Young. Two sisters living a life of genteel poverty in North Bromwich discover that they have inherited a villa near Capri from an uncle. In the warmth of the Italian climate they both flourish, but the presence of the villa's handyman provides a troubling note.

== Adaptations ==
In 1946 Flora Robson and Basil Sydney appeared in a stage adaptation A Man About the House by John Perry at the Piccadilly Theatre in the West End.

In 1947 it was made into a British film of the same title directed by Leslie Arliss and starring Dulcie Gray, Margaret Johnston and Kieron Moore.

== Bibliography ==
- Hall, Michael. Francis Brett Young. Seren, 1997.
- Goble, Alan. The Complete Index to Literary Sources in Film. Walter de Gruyter, 1999.
- Wearing, J.P. The London Stage 1940-1949: A Calendar of Productions, Performers, and Personnel. Rowman & Littlefield, 2014.
