= Thomas Alcock Beck =

English author

- Born: 31 May 1795; Newcastle-upon-Tyne, England
- Died: 26 April 1846 (aged 50); Esthwaite Lodge, Hawkshead, England
- Occupation: Author
- Known for: Author of Annales Furnesienses

Thomas Alcock Beck (1795–1846) was an English author known for writing Annales Furnesienses (1844), a history of Furness Abbey, which was dedicated by permission to Her Majesty Queen Victoria, and which contained twenty-six steel engravings and several woodcuts. Beck was a long-term resident of Hawkshead in Lancashire, where his parents had lived at The Grove. He used a wheelchair for much of his life, being unable to walk due to a spinal complaint. At one time he had attended Hawkshead Grammar School and he matriculated at Trinity College, Cambridge in 1814, but left without taking a degree.

Around 1819, he commenced the building of his regency mansion Esthwaite Lodge (subsequently a youth hostel), to the design of George Webster. The grounds were specially laid out with easy gradients for his wheelchair. Besides other antiquarian interests, he also edited Dr. William Close's unfinished work An Itinerary of Furness.

== Marriage ==
On 25 April 1838 he married Elizabeth Fell of Hawkshead (formerly of Ulverston), having obtained a special license to allow the ceremony to take place within his own home.
