= The Littlest Rebel =

1935 film

- Theatrical release poster
- Directed by: David Butler
- Screenplay by: Edwin J. Burke; Harry Tugend
- Based on: The Littlest Rebel; 1909 play by Edward Peple
- Produced by: Darryl Zanuck (producer); Buddy G. DeSylva (associate producer)
- Starring: John Boles; Jack Holt; Karen Morley; Bill Robinson; Shirley Temple
- Cinematography: John F. Seitz
- Edited by: Irene Morra
- Music by: Cyril Mockridge
- Distributed by: 20th Century Fox
- Release date: December 19, 1935
- Running time: 70 minutes
- Country: United States
- Language: English
- Box office: $1,431,000 (U.S. and Canada rentals)

The Littlest Rebel is a 1935 American musical drama film directed by David Butler. The screenplay by Edwin J. Burke was adapted from a play of the same name by Edward Peple.

== Plot ==
Virgie (Temple) lives with her mother (Morley) and father, Confederate Army captain Herbert Cary (Boles), on a slave plantation in the Antebellum South. During her sixth birthday party, Cary learns that the American Civil War has begun and that he must immediately report for duty, leaving Virgie at home. Worried about her father, Virgie asks the enslaved Uncle Billy (Robinson), about the war, and he tells her that he has heard that a man up North wants to free the slaves, but that he does not know what that will mean.

Shortly after Cary's departure with the other enlisted Confederate men, Union soldiers arrive at the Cary plantation and Virgie hits their leader, Colonel Morrison, with her slingshot, a move he admires for its audacity but warns her not to try again. In response, she tauntingly sings "Dixie" as he leaves. Cary is nearly caught behind enemy lines by Sergeant Dudley (Williams) on a clandestine visit to his family, since the plantation is now in Union-controlled territory. Dudley's men loot the plantation house of hidden food and valuables, and Virgie puts on blackface out of fear of what Union soldiers might do to whites, causing Dudley to chase her through the house and push her mother down a set of stairs in the struggle. At the end of the scuffle, Morrison arrives, and makes Dudley apologize to Virgie and her mother, assigns him lashes as punishment, and makes his men return what they looted. Virgie hits him with another rock from her slingshot as he leaves.

As active combat approaches the house, Mrs. Cary and Uncle Billy leave with Virgie through the woods during a heavy rainstorm, and Mrs. Cary covers Virgie with her cloak to protect her, allowing herself to become soaked and become ill. Despite sheltering in Uncle Billy's cabin for a month after the plantation house was burned down, she is on her deathbed and Uncle Billy sends for Cary. Upon being assured that Cary will look after Virgie, she dies. Union troops arrive shortly after the funeral, forcing Cary to hide in an attic, but he is quickly discovered by Colonel Morrison. Morrison originally believes Cary is on a scouting mission, but Cary explains he is trying to take Virgie to his sister in Richmond, Virginia, swaying the colonel who has a daughter the same age. Morrison writes a pass allowing their safe travel and furnishes Cary with a Yankee uniform, and Cary makes a promise to Morrison that he and Virgie will not tell anyone what they see in Richmond. Virgie is recognized by Sgt. Dudley as they're being questioned in a Union camp, and Cary whips him before being surrounded by soldiers. Cary and Morrison are court-martialed and sentenced to hanging, but a sympathetic officer attempts to secure them a pardon by giving Uncle Billy a letter to bring to Washington, D.C. Having no money for the train ticket, Uncle Billy and Virgie dance in the town square to raise funds. The D.C. judge is so moved by the letter that they are seen by President Abraham Lincoln, and Virgie recounts their story, convincing the President that her father and Morrison are not spies after he learns of her father's promise. Lincoln orders a pardon for the two men to be issued immediately. Virgie sings "Polly Wolly Doodle" with the Union soldiers upon her return to the barracks and hugs her father and Morrison.

== Cast ==
- Shirley Temple as Virgie Cary
- John Boles as Herbert Cary
- Jack Holt as Colonel Morrison
- Karen Morley as Mrs. Cary
- Guinn Williams as Sergeant Dudley
- Frank McGlynn Sr. as President Abraham Lincoln
- Bill Robinson as Uncle Billy
- Willie Best as James Henry
- Bessie Lyle as Mammy Rosabelle
- Hannah Washington as Sally Ann
- Karl Hackett as John Hay (uncredited)
- Jack Mower as Yankee Lt. Hart (uncredited)

== Production ==
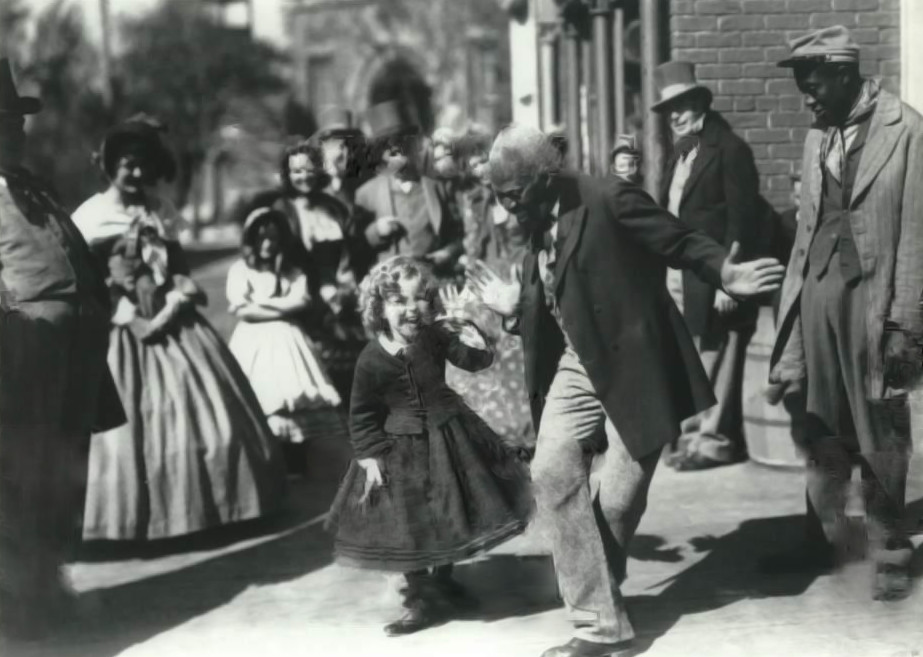
Shirley Temple and Bill Robinson perform a street dance. This scene was later featured in the 1975 M*A*S*H episode "Bulletin Board" (S3E16).

The slingshot scene was written into the movie by screenwriter Edwin Burke after he learned of Temple's natural ability to use the slingshot. She was perfectly on target and needed only one take for the scene. Temple made international headlines when in the context of trying to keep noisy doves on the prison set (which the director explained did not belong in war) she asked "Why doesn't someone make Mussolini stop?" Someone overheard her comment and it made it into the newspapers, angering Mussolini.

== Critical reception ==
=== Upon release ===
Writing for The Spectator in 1936, Graham Greene gave the film a mildly poor review, explaining that he had "expected there [would be] the usual sentimental exploitation of childhood", but that he "had not expected [Temple's] tremendous energy" which he criticized as "a little too enervating".

=== Modern criticism ===
Bill Gibron, of the Online Film Critics Society, wrote: "The racism present in The Littlest Rebel, The Little Colonel and Dimples is enough to warrant a clear critical caveat." However, Gibron, echoing most film critics who continue to see value in Temple's work despite the racism that is present in some of it, also wrote: "Thankfully, the talent at the center of these troubling takes is still worthwhile for some, anyway."

== Adaptations ==
The Littlest Rebel was dramatized as an hour-long radio play on the October 14, 1940, broadcast of Lux Radio Theatre, with Shirley Temple and Claude Rains.

== See also ==
- Shirley Temple filmography
- List of films and television shows about the American Civil War
- List of films featuring slavery
