= Effie Atherton =

British actress (1907–2005)

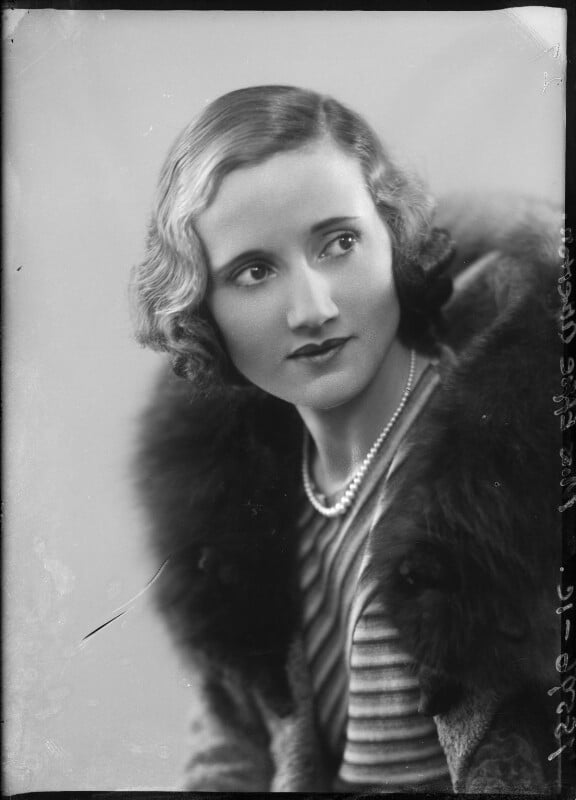
- Atherton in 1934
- Born: Euphemia Walker Anderson; 3 July 1907; Edinburgh, Scotland, United Kingdom
- Died: 11 February 2005 (aged 97); Kensington, London
- Occupations: Actress, singer, dancer, musical comedy performer
- Years active: 1926–1939
- Spouse: Leslie Landau (m. 1935; died 1977) Theodore H. Hoare (m. 1978)

Effie Atherton (born Euphemia Walker Anderson; 3 July 1907 – 11 February 2005), was a British singer, dancer, film actress, and musical comedy performer, known initially for her stage appearances in the West End of London and on Broadway in New York, before moving into prime musical shows on British radio in the 1930s, where she captivated her audiences with her sophisticated songs and monologues, many of which were her own compositions.

== Selected filmography ==
- Aroma of the South Seas (1931 UK version) directed by W. P. Kellino.
- Temptation (1934), directed by Max Neufeld
- School for Stars (1935), produced by Anthony Havelock-Allan

== Early life and career ==
Born Euphemia Walker Anderson in Edinburgh, Scotland, she was the daughter of Andrew Thomas Anderson and the younger sister of the silent movie actress, Ella Atherton.

Effie Atherton made many radio broadcasts and a total of three films, however, her foundation was as a stage performer and she was particularly associated with the works of Noël Coward. Atherton was a clever comedienne who later broadcast on the British radio with Ambrose and his Band; and The Three Rhythm Aces, a successful cabaret trio.

Her early years and her first time on the stage is unknown. By 1924 she had been introduced to the West End stage as a chorus girl in London Calling!

Atherton first travelled to the United States in 1924 to take to the Broadway stage as a chorus girl, along with Gertrude Lawrence, Jessie Matthews and Constance Carpenter in André Charlot Revue, which commenced its run on 23 September 1924, with a total of 513 performances. It was Charlot who gave Noël Coward his first break.

Atherton was her professional name and immigration records to the United States and the Far East using her professional name. During this time she made connections in the industry, including Charlie Chaplin and comic actress, Wyn Clare.

Atherton was part of Charlot's Review of 1925. This followed a number of weeks on Broadway. She returned to London with Charlot and the revue girls, departing New York on RMS Caronia on 24 October 1925, returning to the stage at the Prince of Wales Theatre to star in "The Charlot Show of 1926", a musical by Ronald Jeans. She was still only 18 years of age, yet played multiple roles in the production including the Duchess of Bridlington.

Atherton returned the following year to the United States. The tour included Los Angeles, and the troupe of young girls met Charlie Chaplin. Aged only 19, Atherton's social circle included Gertrude Lawrence, Charlie Chaplin, Merna Kennedy, Amy Reeves and Wyn Clare. Atherton continued to work with Charlot and Coward and was one of the stars of his revues for the next 4 years. Atherton is first named along with Gertrude Lawrence in Coward's 1928 song, "Alas the time is past". With the Great Depression, theatre attendance dropped dramatically, and Charlot was forced into temporary bankruptcy after the failure of Wonder Bar in 1930.

=== 1930s ===
On 29 September 1930 she starred alongside Edward Cooper and Queenie Leonard in the play 'We Three', at the Cafe Anglais, London, which was located on Leicester Square, which was the show place for dance orchestras of the 1920s and the 1930s such as Lew Stone and Roy Fox.

Atherton, Leonard, and Cooper were part of Cochran's 1931 Revue. Atherton, Bobby Clark and Paul McCullough in the leading roles. The song "Bright young people" was described by Coward as a "Mixed trio" of young rich people doing peculiar things.

In 1932, Atherton was already accepting lead performer roles starring in the play "The Mews", by Theodore de Serannes, which ran at the Arts Theatre Club on 24 April 1932, starring alongside Jack Livesey, Alexander Archdale and her sister Ella Atherton. She worked primarily with Noël Coward for his revue and musical play Words and Music. Produced for Cochran and also featuring Ivy St. Helier, Moya Nugent, Joyce Barbour, Romney Brent, Doris Hare, John Mills and Graham Payn. It contained eighteen Coward numbers, notably "Housemaids' Knees". The stage production was presented at the Manchester Opera House on 25 August 1932; this was her earliest recording. The play transferred to the Adelphi Theatre in London and ran for 164 performances. The earliest surviving recordings are from this season.

Atherton's performance in Temptation, a Franco-British film, about a retired singer who flirts with her niece's fiancé, was well-received during 1934. Soon after Atherton began dating film producer Leslie L. Landau.

On 1 June 1935 she featured in Bitter Sweet, a Romantic opera by Coward, adapted for the microphone supporting Anne Ziegler, also featuring Evelyn Laye, Betty Huntley-Wright, Patricia Burke, Patrick Waddington and Norah Howard.

That same year she worked with the composer, Arthur Le Clerq and had a prime time evening slot on the radio waves. Atherton featured prominently in the Radio Times on 8 August 1935 and the 9 August 1935, leading in the radio show "The Air-do wells", produced by Max Kester, with Atherton in the lead role, accompanied by Jean Colin, Marjorie Stedeford, Brian Lawrence, and Ronald Hill. The Gramophone magazine reported in December 1935 that "My young man's ever so nice" and "Dennis the Menace from Venice", His Master's Voice BD 187, were among the most outstanding records nominated by its loyal readers that year.

At the peak of her career, she was reputedly one of the most beautiful women in England.

She married Landau in 1935, and she refocused her career from the stage to the radio waves with the prime time show "Radio Air do", impacting her ability to perform in any future Coward production. The following year, Coward named a "malodorous" stage dog "Atherton" in his 1936 underperforming play Star Chamber.

Atherton embarked on a "Radio Air do" tour of the U.S. in January 1936, following the success of Jack Hylton, departing from Southampton to New York on MV Lafayette, on 8 January 1936, accompanied by her husband and her sister, Ella.

A year later she was living in 719 N. Rodeo Drive, Beverly Hills, California. By now her broadcasting career was coming to an end. Records show that she traveled to Mexico using her "alias" Effie Atherton.

In 1938 she performed on Rudy Vallee's Royal Variety Hour on NBC alongside Cyril Smith as an “English Comedy Act” called “On the Rolly Coaster”. Her hit songs at the time included “The smell of the soil”, “Don't put your daughter on the stage, Mrs. Worthington” and “I'm only her mother, that's all”.

Her period of residence in the United States coincided with that of a theatrical entrepreneur, Bertie Alexander Meyer, and the man that launched her career on stage, André Charlot.

Atherton returned to England a few months before the outbreak of World War II. Just days before the outbreak of hostilities she was part of the Rinso Radio Revue on Radio Luxembourg, alongside Bebe Daniels and Ben Lyon, Tommy Handley, Alice Mann and Sam Browne.

=== 1940s ===
For the BBC, Atherton made occasional studio broadcasts, as a singer on variety programmes, and as an actress in both light and serious drama.

During World War II, Atherton was on the airwaves staring at morale-boosting radio programmes, aimed at British and Commonwealth troops.

The Radio Times evening schedule of 8 October 1940 included the show “Invitation to Romance”, songs by Eric Maschwitz, set to music from various composers, with Atherton, Anne Ziegler, Horace Percival and Ivor John.

Atherton continued to be a regular on the Home Service, starring in the radio adaptation of "Peggy-Ann", a play by Herbert Fields.

By 1943 she was in a play by Mabel Constanduros called "Charge for a Penny Farthing". Her songs continued to be played in on the Home Service during 1943 in the musical show "London, Paris and New York".

In 1945 she featured in the show "Spotlight" and is listed in the now-defunct publication London Calling, along with Donald Edge.

=== 1950s ===
Atherton continued to regularly visit the United States; now traveling in greater style on the RMS Queen Elizabeth, than during her early years and appears on the ship's passenger list of 9 June 1950.

Whilst in Hollywood with her husband, she would stay at Chateau Marmont. Her last transatlantic journey to New York and onto Hollywood for a month was in 1959.

== Personal ==
In 1935 she married Leslie Landau (1904–1977), a script and screenplay writer and film producer, who had success during the 1930s to the 1950s. They had three children; Penelope, Michael, and Caroline. Her first husband died during the summer of 1977, in Westminster, London. She remarried the following year to Theodore H. Hoare in London.

Her last place of residence was 8 Elystan Place, London. She died at the age of 97, on 11 February 2005 in Kensington, London.

== Biography ==
- Parker, John (1978). Who Was Who in the Theatre, 1912–1976. Detroit: Gale. ISBN 978-0-8103-0406-2.
