= The Lady Escapes =

1937 film by Eugene Forde

- Directed by: Eugene Forde
- Written by: Don Ettlinger; Frances Hyland; Leslie Landau; M.M. Musselman
- Based on: Édes Teher by Jenö Heltai
- Produced by: Leslie Landau
- Starring: Gloria Stuart; Michael Whalen; George Sanders
- Cinematography: Lucien Andriot
- Edited by: Alfred DeGaetano
- Music by: Samuel Kaylin
- Production company: Twentieth Century Fox
- Distributed by: Twentieth Century Fox
- Release date: July 23, 1937
- Running time: 63 minutes
- Country: United States
- Language: English

The Lady Escapes is a 1937 American comedy film directed by Eugene Forde and starring Gloria Stuart, Michael Whalen, George Sanders and Cora Witherspoon. It is based on a Hungarian play.

== Plot summary ==
A newly married couple argue constantly leading to her fleeing to France in the company of a glamorous French writer, where she is pursued by her husband.

== Cast ==
- Gloria Stuart as Linda Ryan
- Michael Whalen as Michael Hilton
- George Sanders as Rene Blanchard
- Cora Witherspoon as Fanny Worthington
- Gerald Oliver Smith as Reggie Farnworth
- June Brewster as Dolores
- Howard C. Hickman as Judge
- Joseph R. Tozer as Drake
- Don Alvarado as Antonio
- Maurice Cass as Monsieur Cheval
- Franklin Pangborn as Pierre
- Tom Ricketts as Uncle George
- Lynn Bari as Bridesmaid
- Claire Du Brey as Woman in Theatre
- Regis Toomey as American Reporter
- Milton Owen as English Reporter
- Theresa Harris as Maid
- Eugene Borden as French Official
- Milton Kibbee as American Express Man
- Syd Saylor as Carpenter
- Lon Chaney Jr. as Reporter
- Robert Lowery as Reporter
