= Knave of Hearts (film) =

1954 film

- Directed by: René Clément
- Written by: René Clément; Hugh Mills; Raymond Queneau
- Based on: M. Ripois et la Nemesis by Louis Hemon
- Produced by: Paul Graetz
- Starring: Gérard Philipe; Valerie Hobson; Joan Greenwood; Margaret Johnston; Natasha Parry
- Cinematography: Oswald Morris
- Edited by: Françoise Javet; Vera Campbell
- Music by: Roman Vlad
- Production company: Transcontinental Films
- Distributed by: Cinédis
- Release dates: 19 May 1954 (France); 21 June 1954 (London)
- Running time: 100 minutes
- Countries: France; United Kingdom
- Language: English
- Box office: £119,417 (UK); 2,005,349 admissions (France)

Knave of Hearts is a 1954 British-French comedy drama film directed by René Clément and starring Gérard Philipe, Valerie Hobson and Joan Greenwood. The film was shot at the Elstree Studios of Associated British and on location across London including Trafalgar Square and Hyde Park. The film's sets were designed by the art director Ralph Brinton. In France it was released as Monsieur Ripois, referencing the title of the original novel by Louis Hémon.

The film was entered into the 1954 Cannes Film Festival, where it won the Special Jury Prize.

== Synopsis ==
André Ripois, a Frenchman settled in London, is a serial philanderer and seducer of women. His wife, Catherine, tired of his infidelities, leaves for Edinburgh to prepare for a divorce. Meanwhile, André, between several opportunistic affairs, falls in love with Patricia, a friend of his wife, and uses numerous timeworn stratagems to seduce her.

After tricking her into having dinner at his house, he tells her about his life and his schemes to gain the compassion and protection of one woman after another, deceiving them and growing tired of them as soon as he has seduced them. He tells her about Anne, his superior at work, who he starts a relationship with after she criticises his efforts in the office; Norah, whom he pursued in the street and left just before having to meet her mother after asking her to marry him; Marcelle, a French prostitute in London who sheltered him when he was put out on the street for not paying his rent, and whom he abandoned, taking enough money from her to start a business as a French teacher.

Unable to get his way with Patricia, who has been warned by Catherine and who understands that she is just another woman on his list, he decides to fake his suicide by throwing himself out of a window, but is left paralysed for life. When Catherine hears that he has tried to commit suicide because of her, she gives up on divorce, although she does not know it was a deception to seduce Patricia: Ripois becomes, in spite of himself, his wife's "prisoner", condemned to a life of marital fidelity.

== Cast ==
- Gérard Philipe as Andre Ripois
- Natasha Parry as Patricia
- Valerie Hobson as Catherine Ripois
- Joan Greenwood as Norah
- Margaret Johnston as Anne
- Germaine Montero as Marcelle
- Percy Marmont as Catherine's Father
- Diana Decker as Diana
- Bill Shine as Pub Barman
- Eric Pohlmann as Boarding House Proprietor
- Martin Benson as Art
- Mae Bacon as Mrs. Rose
- Margo Field as Doris Braddock
- Julie Anslow as Maisie Smith
- Harry Towb as Stewart
- Gerald Campion as Harry
- Judith Nelmes as Marcelle
- Arthur Howard as Priest
- Eileen Way as Landlady
- Beryl Cooke as Kind Typist

== Bibliography ==
- Burton, Alan & Chibnall, Steve. Historical Dictionary of British Cinema. Scarecrow Press, 2013.
