= Grand Theatre, Derby =

Former theatre in Derby, England

Coordinates: 52.919341179611045°N 1.4761842946768076°W

Historic photograph of the theatre.

The Grand Theatre, Derby was a theatre in Derby in the English Midlands. It was opened in 1886, designed in an Italian renaissance style by a Birmingham architect Oliver Essex. It originally had a capacity of 2,500. Shortly after opening the theatre suffered a major fire, in which two people were killed and the building substantially damaged. Rebuilt it became a successful venue for touring companies and pantomime. In 1950 the theatre was closed down and was later converted into a ballroom.

In 1924 the play Dracula starring Hamilton Deane began its tour in Derby. In 1945 the play A Man About the House premiered at the Grand before transferring to the West End.

== Bibliography ==
- Armitage, Jill. Derby A History. Amberley Publishing Limited, 2014.
- Browning, John Edgar & Picart, Caroline Joan. Dracula in Visual Media: Film, Television, Comic Book and Electronic Game Appearances, 1921-2010. McFarland, 2014.
- Wearing, J.P. The London Stage 1940-1949: A Calendar of Productions, Performers, and Personnel. Rowman & Littlefield, 2014.
