= Portrait of Clare (novel) =

1927 novel

- Author: Francis Brett Young
- Language: English
- Genre: Drama
- Publisher: Heinemann
- Publication date: 1927
- Media type: Print

Portrait of Clare is a 1927 novel by the British writer Francis Brett Young. A commercial success, it also won the James Tait Black Memorial Prize.

== Adaptation ==
In 1950 it was made into a film directed by Lance Comfort and starring Margaret Johnston, Richard Todd and Ronald Howard.

== Bibliography ==
- Cannadine, David. This Little World: The Value of the Novels of Francis Brett Young as a Guide to the State of Midland Society, 1870-1925. Worcestershire Historical Society, 1982.
- Goble, Alan. The Complete Index to Literary Sources in Film. Walter de Gruyter, 1999.
