= Man of the House =

Man of the House may refer to:

== Film and television ==
- Man of the House (1995 film), a comedy starring Chevy Chase and Jonathan Taylor Thomas
- Man of the House (2005 film), a film starring Tommy Lee Jones
- Man of the House (TV series), a 2007 Singaporean Chinese modern family drama
- "Man of the House" (House), an episode of House

== Other media ==
- "Man of the House" (song), by Chuck Wicks, 2009
- "Man of the House", a 2026 song by Skye Newman from SE9 Part 2
- "Man of the House", a 2010 song by Fantasia from her album Back to Me
- Man of the House, a 1987 autobiography by Tip O'Neill
- The Man of the House, a 1996 novel by Stephen McCauley

== See also ==
- A Man About the House (disambiguation)
- A Man in the House, a 1940 film
