= A Man of Sentiment =

1933 film by Richard Thorpe

- Directed by: Richard Thorpe
- Written by: Frederick Hazlitt Brennan; Robert Ellis
- Produced by: George R. Batcheller
- Starring: Marian Marsh; Owen Moore; Christian Rub
- Cinematography: M.A. Anderson
- Production company: Chesterfield Pictures
- Distributed by: Chesterfield Pictures
- Release date: September 15, 1933
- Running time: 62 minutes
- Country: United States
- Language: English

A Man of Sentiment is a 1933 American pre-Code drama film directed by Richard Thorpe and starring Marian Marsh, Owen Moore and Christian Rub.

== Cast ==
- Marian Marsh as Julia Wilkens
- Owen Moore as Stanley Colton
- Christian Rub as Herman Heupelkossel
- William Bakewell as John Russell
- Emma Dunn as Mrs. John Russell Sr.
- Edmund Breese as John Russell Sr.
- Geneva Mitchell as Doris Russell
- Pat O'Malley as Officer Ryan
- Syd Saylor as Swede - Orderly
- Lucille Ward as Miss Tracy
- Cornelius Keefe as Dr. Jordan
- Otto Hoffman as Landlord
- Matt McHugh as Alex (Willie) Moran - Orderly
- William Bailey as Doctor
- Mildred Washington as Mildred - the Maid

== Bibliography ==
- Pitts, Michael R. Poverty Row Studios, 1929-1940. McFarland & Company, 2005.
