= The Key of Life =

1928 novel

- Author: Francis Brett Young
- Language: English
- Genre: Drama
- Publisher: Heinemann (UK); Knopf (US)
- Publication date: 1928
- Media type: Print

The Key of Life is a 1928 novel by the British writer Francis Brett Young. It was part of a group of cultural works that acknowledged a new Egyptomania in the wake of the discovery of Tutankhamun tomb by Howard Carter in 1922.

Ruth Morgan, a young woman living in a village in the Welsh borders, falls in love with an archaeologist working on a nearby dig after he falls ill. She follows him to Egypt where he is employed on a major excavation.

== Bibliography ==
- Michael Hall. Francis Brett Young. Seren, 1997.
