= Mildred Washington =

American actress and dancer

Mildred Washington (1905–1933) was an American actress and dancer during the 1920s and 1930s. Washington was African American.

== Education and early life ==
Mildred Washington was the youngest daughter of Lillie and Millard Washington, the third of their four children. She was born in Houston, but in 1913 the family moved to Los Angeles, where Mildred attended school. She graduated from Los Angeles High School as valedictorian. She attended University of California, Los Angeles for two years and also attended Columbia University.

Legal documents indicate she was briefly married and gave birth to a daughter, Lillie June Youngae, in 1923. The following year, she made her stage debut.

== Career ==
Before becoming an actor, Washington appeared and acted in musicals. She later worked at California nightclubs and theaters. Washington was the dance director and headliner at Sebastian’s Cotton Club for many years. She performed at Apex, a black club in Los Angeles owned by Curtis Mosby. She also performed at Legion Club and Jazzland.

In the 1929 film Hearts in Dixie, Washington was one of the leading actors, along with Clarence Muse. Her character was named Trailia. The film was one of the first big-studio productions to boast a predominantly African-American cast. A musical, the film celebrates African-American music and dance. The film was directed by Paul Sloane, produced by William Fox, and had a screenplay written by Walter Weems.

In the 1933 film Torch Singer, Washington acted as Carrie, who was the confidante and maid of the starring role played by Claudette Colbert.

Other films featuring Washington include A Man of Sentiment (1933), The Shopworn Angel (1928), The Thoroughbred (1928), and In Old Kentucky (1927).

== Death ==
During the 1933 Long Beach earthquake, Washington developed appendicitis, which was followed by peritonitis. At this time, she was working at Grauman's Chinese Theatre in Hollywood, Los Angeles. Washington died in 1933, at age 28.
