= Black Roses (novel) =

1929 novel

- First edition
- Author: Francis Brett Young
- Language: English
- Genre: Drama
- Publisher: Heinemann
- Publication date: 1 January 1929
- Media type: Print

Black Roses is a 1929 novel by the British writer Francis Brett Young.

== Plot ==
The English painter Paul Ritchie is on a cruise around the Mediterranean, when the ship pulls into Naples. This sparks his memories of many decades before when he had lived in the city and found friendship with a fellow artist and love with their landlady. However all three were struck down during a cholera epidemic of which only Ritchie survived. Without ever setting foot back in the city, he is finally able to banish the ghosts that have haunted him all these years.

== Context ==
During the 1920s Young spent a great deal of his time in Capri. He generally set his novels in places he knew well as seen with his East African and Mercian novels.

== Bibliography ==
- Michael Hall. Francis Brett Young. Seren, 1997.
