= My Brother Jonathan (TV series) =

1985 British TV series

- Genre: Drama
- Based on: My Brother Jonathan by Francis Brett Young
- Written by: James Andrew Hall
- Directed by: Anthony Garner
- Starring: Daniel Day-Lewis
- Composer: Stanley Myers
- Country of origin: United Kingdom
- Original language: English
- No. of series: 1
- No. of episodes: 5

Production
- Running time: 50 minutes
- Production company: BBC

Original release
- Network: BBC Two
- Release: 12 August – 9 September 1985

My Brother Jonathan is a British television drama series which first aired on BBC 2 in five episodes between 12 August and 9 September 1985. It is based on the 1928 novel of the same name by Francis Brett Young, which had previously been made into a 1948 film My Brother Jonathan. Jonathan Dakers is an idealistic young doctor in a coal mining area of Northern England around the time of the First World War.

== Cast ==
- Daniel Day-Lewis as Jonathan Dakers (5 episodes)
- Benedict Taylor as Harold Dakers (5 episodes)
- Helen Ryan as Lavinia Dakers (5 episodes)
- Caroline Bliss as Edie Martyn (5 episodes)
- Barbara Kellerman as Rachel Hammond (4 episodes)
- Michael Troughton as Arthur Martock (4 episodes)
- John Stone as Dr. Craig (4 episodes)
- Tony Doyle as John Morse (4 episodes)
- Frederick Treves as Dr. Hammond (3 episodes)
- Sally Watkins as Lily Rudge (3 episodes)
- T. P. McKenna as Lloyd Moore (2 episodes)
- Michael Loughnan as Dr. Monaghan (2 episodes)
- James Cossins as Reverend Perry (2 episodes)
- Raymond Witch as Joseph (2 episodes)
- Mark Kingston as Eugene Dakers (1 episode)
- John Channel-Milis as Police sergeant (1 episode)
- Barbara Darnley as Honor Martyn (1 episode)
- Kate Dunn as Ellen Greenly (1 episode)
- Julian Gartside as Alec Martyn (1 episode)
- Michael Godley as Major (1 episode)
- James Greene as Mr. Wheeler (1 episode)
- Patrick Jordan as Mr. Martyn (1 episode)
- Ken Kitson as Kisha Hodgkiss (1 episode)
- Jeni Ktori as Sister (1 episode)
- Muriel Lawford as Old woman (1 episode)
- George Little as George Higgins (1 episode)
- Robin MacIntyre as Lily's father (1 episode)
- Celia Montague as Sheila Martyn (1 episode)
- Judy Norman as Mrs. Lumley (1 episode)
- Ann Payot as Miss. Jessel (1 episode)
- Margaret Pilleau as Nursing sister (1 episode)
- Reg Rogers as Station official (1 episode)
- Anthony Roye as Mr. Wilburn (1 episode)
- Catherine Schell as Mrs. Martyn (1 episode)
- Ken Sharrock as Joe Matthews (1 episode)
- Bill Stewart as Mr. Grise (1 episode)
- Kevin Stoney as Registrar (1 episode)
- John Taylor as Guard (1 episode)
- Bill Ward as Sgt. Brook (1 episode)

== Bibliography ==
- Ellen Baskin. Serials on British Television, 1950-1994. Scolar Press, 1996.
