= Jim Redlake =

1930 novel

- First edition
- Author: Francis Brett Young
- Language: English
- Genre: Drama
- Publisher: Heinemann
- Publication date: 1930
- Media type: Print

Jim Redlake is a 1930 novel by the British writer Francis Brett Young. It portrays the life of the title character from childhood. Like most of his works, it was influenced by his own life experiences. Scenes set during the East African campaign had been censored from his earlier memoir of the campaign Marching on Tanga. Young later declared it his favourite of his own novels.

== Bibliography ==
- Robert Gaudi. African Kaiser: Paul Von Lettow-Vorbeck and the Great War in Africa, 1914-1918. Oxford University Press, 2017.
- Michael Hall. Francis Brett Young. Seren, 1997.
