= The House Under the Water =

1932 novel

- First US edition
- Author: Francis Brett Young
- Language: English
- Genre: Drama
- Publisher: Heinemann (UK); Harper & Brothers (US)
- Publication date: 1932
- Media type: Print

The House Under the Water is a 1932 novel by the British writer Francis Brett Young. It is one of his "Mercian novels", set in the West Midlands and Welsh borders.

It portrays the construction of the Elan Valley Reservoirs to provide a water supply for the rapidly expanding Birmingham, requiring the flooding of a significant area of land. This included a house associated with the poet Shelley, which is referred to in the novel's title.

== Adaptation ==
In 1961 the novel was made by the BBC into an eight-part television series of the same title.

== Bibliography ==
- Cannadine, David. In Churchill's Shadow: Confronting the Past in Modern Britain. Oxford University Press, 2004.
