= Portrait of Clare (film) =

1950 British film by Lance Comfort

- Directed by: Lance Comfort
- Written by: Adrian Alington; Leslie Landau
- Based on: Portrait of Clare by Francis Brett Young
- Produced by: Leslie Landau
- Starring: Margaret Johnston; Richard Todd; Robin Bailey; Ronald Howard
- Cinematography: Günther Krampf
- Edited by: Clifford Boote
- Music by: Leighton Lucas
- Production company: ABPC
- Release date: 13 November 1950
- Running time: 100 minutes
- Country: United Kingdom
- Language: English
- Box office: £100,643 (UK)

Portrait of Clare is a 1950 black and white British drama film directed by Lance Comfort and starring Margaret Johnston, Richard Todd, Robin Bailey and Ronald Howard. It was written by Adrian Alington and Leslie Landau based on the 1927 novel of the same name written by Francis Brett Young.

== Plot ==
The film is begins in a large country mansion owned by the Hingstons and is set just after the Second World War. Lady Hingston starts to recall her youth to a young granddaughter, Sylvia.

The story is then told in flashback, returning firstly to around 1900. The family solicitor, Mr Wilburn, declares his love of Clare to her grandmother. However, she enters and announces her engagement to Ralph Hingston.

They marry but Ralph drowns as she watches him, following a fall from a weir while trout fishing. Clare gives birth to a son soon after and names him Steven.

The story jumps by around five years to when Steven is about to start school. Lady Hingston goes with Wilburn to take him to a boarding school. Wilburn asks her to marry him on the drive home.

She meets his best friend, Robert Hart (also a solicitor) on a train one day and clearly cares for him. He is the best man at her marriage to Wilburn. Steven is only told about the wedding when he returns from school for the Christmas holidays. He is quite upset, begins keeping secrets and is openly defiant to Wilburn. He accuses Wilburn of marrying his mother for her money. He is locked in his room with no supper. Steven escapes out of the window and disappears into a dark stormy night. Wilburn shows no concern at all but Robert (who is visiting) goes to search. Steven has run to his grandmother's house.

In Wilburn's office, Wilburn and Mayhew in West Bromwich his partner Ernest Mayhew commits suicide after embezzling funds. The police arrive but Wilburn is only interested in the good name of his firm. He initially hides the suicide note. Robert apologises to the police on his behalf. Wilburn realises that Clare only married him to give Steven a father and they should part from their loveless marriage.

We do not see Hart marry Clare. Steven refers to him as "Uncle Robert" in one of the final scenes.

== Cast ==
- Margaret Johnston as Clare Hingston
- Richard Todd as Robert Hart
- Robin Bailey as Dudley Wilburn
- Ronald Howard as Ralph Hingston
- Jeremy Spenser as the teenage Steven Hingston
- Marjorie Fielding as Aunt Cathie
- Molly Urquhart as Thirza the maid
- Beckett Bould as Bissell
- Anthony Nicholls as Doctor Boyd
- Lloyd Pearson as Sir Joseph Hingston
- Mary Clare as Lady Hingston
- S. Griffiths-Moss as Bates
- Campbell Copelin as Inspector Cunningham
- Bruce Seton as Lord Steven Wolverbury
- Yvonne Andre as Marguerite
- Anne Gunning as Sylvia
- Grace Arnold as Lady Astill
- Robert Adair as Sir Joseph Astill
- Charles Paton as the Registrar
- Amy Veness as lady on train
- Hugh Morton as Ernest Mayhew
- Griffiths Moss as Bates

== Critical reception ==
The Monthly Film Bulletin wrote: "Sentimental, long drawn out, and heavy going."

Kine Weekly wrote: "The picture is, on the whole, a pleasant and, at times, moving bit of fiction, but why do British directors still insist on menials adopting phoney brogues and expressions? Another tiresome convention is the seating of the heroine at the piano every time there is emotional tension. If these theatrical touches had been avoided the film would have been twice as good."

Variety wrote: "For 100 minuies, the film unspools in leisurely style and at no stage does the tempo rise. The snail-like pace with which the plot unfolds induces an air of monotony. ... Miss Johnston, whose performance as Clare dominates the plot, is an accomplished actress worthy of much befter material. Her genuine sincerity and pleasing style show up nicely. Todd is most inadequately served in what is, to all intents and purposes, a minor role. Young Spenser infuses some life into the film and plays the kid part in an impish, unprecocious manner. Ronald Howard and Bailey are adequate as the first and second husbands, and one of the best acting performances comes from Mary Clare as Clare's overpowering first mother-in-law."

TV Guide wrote, "the story suffers from a slack pace, though Johnston adds a lot of charm and sincerity to her role."
