= Mr. and Mrs. Pennington =

1931 novel

- First edition
- Author: Francis Brett Young
- Language: English
- Genre: Drama
- Publisher: Heinemann
- Publication date: 1931
- Media type: Print

Mr. and Mrs. Pennington is a 1931 novel by the British writer Francis Brett Young. It portrays the courtship and first year of marriage a couple, and as with many of Young's Mercian novels takes place in North Bromwich and other settings.

== Bibliography ==
- Michael Hall. Francis Brett Young. Seren, 1997.
