= Sea Horses (novel) =

1925 novel

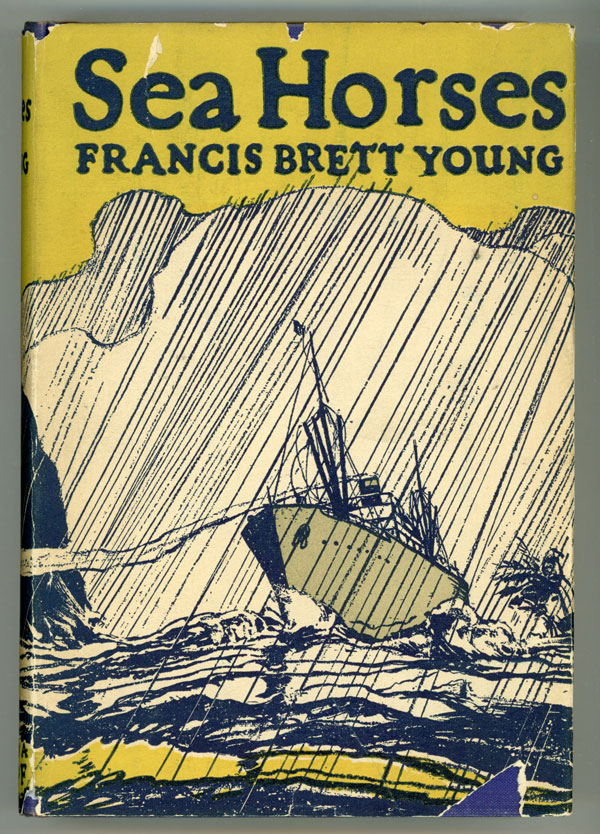
- First US edition
- Author: Francis Brett Young
- Language: English
- Genre: Drama
- Publisher: Cassell (UK); Knopf (US)
- Publication date: 1925
- Media type: Print

Sea Horses is a 1925 novel by the British writer Francis Brett Young.

== Adaptation ==
In 1926 the novel was made into a silent film Sea Horses by American studio Paramount Pictures. Directed by Allan Dwan and starring Jack Holt, Florence Vidor and William Powell, it is now considered a lost film.

== Bibliography ==
- Hall, Michael. Francis Brett Young. Seren, 1997.
- Goble, Alan. The Complete Index to Literary Sources in Film. Walter de Gruyter, 1999.
