= A Man About the House =

- UK release poster
- Directed by: Leslie Arliss
- Written by: J.B. Williams; Leslie Arliss
- Based on: A Man About the House by Francis Brett Young
- Produced by: Edward Black
- Starring: Dulcie Gray; Margaret Johnston; Kieron Moore; Guy Middleton
- Cinematography: Georges Périnal
- Edited by: Russell Lloyd
- Music by: Nicholas Brodszky
- Color process: Black and white
- Production company: London Film Productions
- Distributed by: British Lion Films (UK); 20th Century Fox (USA)
- Release date: 3 October 1947
- Running time: 94 minutes
- Country: United Kingdom
- Language: English
- Budget: £304,521
- Box office: £166,075

A Man About the House is a 1947 British drama film directed by Leslie Arliss and starring Dulcie Gray, Margaret Johnston and Kieron Moore. It was written by J. B. Williams and Arliss based on the 1942 novel of the same name by Francis Brett Young.

== Plot ==
English sisters Ellen and Agnes Isit inherit a Neapolitan villa from a dead uncle and move to Italy to view and sell their property. A local man, Salvatore, has been employed by the uncle his entire life and manages the villa and its vineyard. Exploring her late uncle's studio, Ellen uncovers a painting of a nude Salvatore as Bacchus.

Ellen becomes drawn to the carefree life of the locals and Salvatore's romantic charisma, while the prudish Agnes resists. Agnes and Salvatore are married, making Salvatore the master of the estate.

Ellen becomes aware of a change in Salvatore's behaviour toward Agnes. Not long after the marriage, Agnes's health begins to deteriorate and Ellen's suspicions are aroused. She expresses her concerns to visiting English doctor Benjamin Dench, who is Agnes's former fiancé. Ellen enlists Dench's help in trying to prove that Salvatore is slowly murdering Agnes with arsenic. The villa had once belonged to Salvatore's family, and he has long been determined to regain ownership. He had poisoned the sisters' uncle to inherit the estate.

Salvatore and Dench struggle on a clifftop, and Dench warns Salvatore to leave the country. Ellen and Dench return to the villa to tend the sick and weak Agnes. They learn that Salvatore is dead, as he threw himself from the clifftop in despair rather than losing the property. Ellen and Dench, who have fallen in love, depart to England and leave Agnes, now recovered and determined to remain at the villa and to fulfil her dead husband's wishes, tending the vineyard.

== Cast ==
- Dulcie Gray as Ellen Isit
- Margaret Johnston as Agnes Isit
- Kieron Moore as Salvatore
- Guy Middleton as Dr. Benjamin Dench
- Felix Aylmer as Richard Sanctuary
- Lilian Braithwaite as Mrs. Armitage
- Reginald Purdell as Higgs
- Wilfred Caithness as solicitor
- Gina Lollobrigida as a young girl
- Jone Salinas as Maria
- Marisa Finiani as Assunter
- Fulvia De Priamo as Gita
- Nicola Esposita as Antonina
- Andreas Malandrinos as peasant
- Philip Ridgeway as polite man
- Victor Rietta as railway porter

== Production ==
The movie was part of a slate of new films from Alex Korda which also included The Shop at Sly Corner (1947) and Night Beat (1948).

Producer Edward Black had worked for many years at Gainsborough before resigning in November 1943 to work for Alex Korda. Black spent several years announcing various projects, before proceeding with two, Man About the House and Bonnie Prince Charlie. Location work was done on Bonnie Prince then was halted. Filming for A Man About the House took place in Ravello, Italy for five weeks, with studio work done at Shepperton Studios.

The film was produced by Edward Black and edited by Russell Lloyd, with cinematography by Georges Périnal and music by Nicholas Brodszky. The film's sets were designed by the art director Andrej Andrejew.

Dulcie Gray felt Leslie Arliss was "underestimated" because he had made The Man in Grey "and he was being rubbished by critics all the time." She added:

He helped very much indeed on the characterisations. He was shrewd, very kind and absolutely on one’s side, and he had a very firm, clear vision of Maggie Johnston and me. It is my great regret that that film wasn’t in colour, it was so beautifully photographed... It was decided to hold the opening at Eastbourne, I think, and there was a huge motorcade with a star in every limousine. The film was an absolute flop and Leslie saw at once why it had failed with the audience. He decided which scenes were failing and he was absolutely right; he cut those scenes and the film was then a great success.

== Reception ==
=== Box office ===
The film was considered a "notable box office attraction" in England in 1947.

As of 30 June 1949, the film earned £166,075 in the UK, of which £111,820 went to the producer. Another account said it earned £187,115 in the UK.

=== Critical ===
The Monthly Film Bulletin wrote: "Frankly melodramatic, the film goes with a swing, and the sunny beauty of the Mediterranean, the singing in the vineyards and some amusing moments when the two slightly frumpish English ladies arrive in their new home are highspots. For a melodrama there is perhaps too much embarrassingly painful emphasis on the fact that Agnes is making a fool of herself. Kieron Moore gives an extremely promising performance, and there are delightful minor performances from Felix Aylmer and Lilian Braithwaite."

The Daily Film Renter wrote: "Edwardian drama admirably catches the sinister, yet strangely pleasant, fascination of Francis Brett Young's novel about twa superior maiden ladies who inherit an Italian villa and a poisoner with it. Most outstanding feature is the superb performance by Kieron Moore, who is every inch a star, and is going to make some of the biggest box office bets sit up and take notice. One deprecates the silly ending, which attempts to improve upon the original author, who made the villain shoot himself. Apart from that, the film makes gripping, unusual entertainment, with apt dialogue, strongly characterised, yet untouched by the morbid gloom associated with the current crime wave offerings."

Variety wrote "Lack of marquee names is bound to have effect on pulling power of this picture, especially for America; and the best it can attain is the dualer spot. But with all its deficiencies, this... is good cinema, and should do well on its general release."

== Radio version ==
Margaret Johnson reprised her performance in a radio version of the film.
