= My Brother Jonathan (film) =

1948 British film by Harold French

- Australian daybill poster
- Directed by: Harold French
- Written by: Adrian Alington; Leslie Landau
- Based on: My Brother Jonathan by Francis Brett Young
- Produced by: Warwick Ward
- Starring: Michael Denison; Dulcie Gray; Ronald Howard
- Cinematography: Derick Williams
- Edited by: Charles Hasse
- Music by: Hans May
- Production company: Associated British Picture Corporation
- Distributed by: Allied Artists (US)
- Release date: 5 February 1948 (UK)
- Running time: 102 minutes
- Country: United Kingdom
- Language: English
- Budget: £198,000 or £193,851
- Box office: £260,903 (UK)

My Brother Jonathan is a 1948 British drama film directed by Harold French and starring Michael Denison, Dulcie Gray, Ronald Howard and Beatrice Campbell. It is adapted from the 1928 novel of the same name by Francis Brett Young, later turned into a television series of the same title.

The film was part of an attempt to relaunch major production by ABPC following the Second World War.

== Plot ==
The story revolves around the life of Jonathan Dakers, a small-town doctor. He is training to be a surgeon when his father dies. Due to the resulting financial problems, he cannot continue his training. The story starts in present time but then goes briefly into flashback to 1900. Jonathan and his brother go to a new private school. As soon as they arrive they join a game of cricket, where a young girl Edith (Edie) keeps the score.

The story then jumps forward (still in flashback) to Jonathan in his studies as a doctor. He then meets Edith again and they become involved. He asks her to marry him but she declines saying she wants to travel.

At the hospital Jonathan is called to certify a death and it turns out to be his father, hit by a car while crossing the road. It is then revealed that the father was a corset salesman (which even his wife did not know) and he had misspent Jonathan's inheritance (which was in trust). Jonathan promises his brother Harold that he will still be able to finish his degree at Cambridge University.

Jonathan buys a share in Dr. Hammond's general practice in Wednesford, a poor foundry town in the north. He maintains a relationship with Edie, writing to her as she winters with her mother in Monte Carlo on the French Riviera. The local cottage hospital refuses him permission to bring his patients there and as he is not a Fellow of the Royal College of Surgeons also refuse him permission to operate.

Harold and Jonathan are supposed to travel to London where Edie is to meet them. A patient collapses in the surgery and Jonathan decides to stay and operate on her to remove her appendix.

Harold returns and tells Jonathan that he loves Edie and is going to marry her. They celebrate together on New Year's Eve 1913/14. Jonathan moves his affections from Edie to Rachel, his partner's daughter and assistant. Harold (Hal) joins up at the start of the First World War. He is killed leaving Edie pregnant but unmarried so Jonathan returns to her and marries her to preserve respectability.

When Dakers notes that many patients have been injured in industrial accidents at the foundry, he comes into conflict with its owner Sir Joseph Higgins, and the owner's son-in-law Dr. Craig, who owns the town's competing medical practice. He writes a report criticising the condition of the foundry and buildings the workers live in but Craig, who is also the local Health Officer, deliberately mislays it.

When Dakers performs a life saving tracheotomy on a child with diphtheria, and takes the child to the cottage hospital, he is charged with misconduct, as the hospital charter precludes infectious cases. He is asked to attend a medical tribunal. Jonathan explains he had no choice in order to save the child. He is charged with not reporting a case of diphtheria and operating without permission. Dakers publicly accuses the medical authorities of suppressing health issues in the town and not serving the town. Dakers suggests public subscription to support medical treatment of the poor. The public are very much behind Dakers.

They decide to change the operation of the hospital. The corrupt officials (Higgins and Dr. Craig) resign. As the meeting concludes a siren sounds... there is a big fire at one of the foundries. Craig is injured and Jonathan operates on him and saves his life.

Dr. Hammond meanwhile serves at the birth of Edie's son. However Edie dies soon after, first telling Jonathan to be happy with Rachel.

The story jumps back to 1939 where it started. Jonathan and Rachel are married. Edie's son is fully grown and in army uniform.

== Cast ==
- Michael Denison as Jonathan Dakers
- Dulcie Gray as Rachel Hammond
- Ronald Howard as Harold (Hal) Dakers
- Stephen Murray as Dr. Craig
- Mary Clare as Mrs. Dakers
- Finlay Currie as Dr. John Hammond
- Beatrice Campbell as Edith (Edie) Martyn
- Beatrice Varley as Mrs. Hodgkiss
- James Robertson Justice as Eugene Dakers (his father)
- James Hayter as Tom Morse
- Jessica Spencer as Connie
- John Salew as Wilburn
- Pete Murray as Tony Dakers, Edie's son
- Wylie Watson as Bagley
- Hilda Bayley as Mrs. Perry
- Josephine Stuart as Lily Rudge
- Stuart Lindsell as Mr. Martyn
- Arthur Young as Sir Joseph Higgins

== Production ==
The film was made at Elstree Studios and Welwyn Studios, with location shooting taking place at Aston Rowant railway station in Oxfordshire. The sets were designed by the art director Douglas Daniels.

Director Harold French said he did not pick Michael Denison but he approved him.

== Reception ==
=== Box office ===
The film was a big hit on release, being the third most popular movie at the British box office in 1948. It led to Michael Denison being voted the 6th most popular British star.

Michael Balcon later claimed the film earned £1,041,000 at the UK box office of which £416,000 went on the entertainment tax, £375,000 went to exhibitors and £57,000 to the distributors, meaning the makers of the film did not recover their costs from the UK release. According to another account as of 1 April 1950 the film earned distributor's gross receipts of £226,362 in the UK of which £142,813 went to the producer.

=== Critical ===
The Monthly Film Bulletin wrote: "The novel was a long one and events did not follow hot foot upon one another as is, rather of necessity, the case in the film, at any rate towards the end, when it leaves one rather breathless." In British Sound Films: The Studio Years 1928–1959 David Quinlan rated the film as "good", writing: "Solidly crafted version of bestseller really packs in a lot of story."

The Radio Times Guide to Films gave the film 2/5 stars, writing: "Time has not been kind to the films featuring husband and wife Michael Denison and Dulcie Gray. Yet Denison's clipped tones and stiff acting style and Gray's mousey loyalty turned this into a respectable hit. ... Polished but sterile."
