= A Man About the House (play) =

- Written by: John Perry
- Original language: English
- Genre: Drama
- Setting: 1908, outside Naples

Premiere
- Date premiered: 15 October 1945
- Place premiered: Grand Theatre, Derby

A Man About the House is a play by the British writer John Perry, adapted from Francis Brett Young's 1942 novel of the same title about an Edwardian English spinster who inherits an Italian villa, and falls in love with and marries the butler who has secret designs on the estate that had once belonged to his family.

It premiered at the Grand Theatre, Derby on 15 October 1945 before transferring to the West End. It ran for 100 performances from 27 February to 25 May 1946 at the Piccadilly Theatre. The cast included Flora Robson, Basil Sydney and Ernest Thesiger.

== Bibliography ==
- Wearing, J.P. The London Stage 1940-1949: A Calendar of Productions, Performers, and Personnel. Rowman & Littlefield, 2014.
