= White Ladies (novel) =

1935 novel

- First edition (UK)
- Author: Francis Brett Young
- Language: English
- Genre: Drama
- Publisher: Heinemann (UK); Harper & Brothers (US)
- Publication date: 1935
- Media type: Print

White Ladies is a 1935 novel by the British writer Francis Brett Young. The granddaughter of a wealthy tycoon and his well-bred wife becomes obsessed with recovering the family estate, the Elizabethan manor house named White Ladies. Like many of the author's Mercian novels, much of the novel is set in Worcestershire.

== Bibliography ==
- Cannadine, David. In Churchill's Shadow: Confronting the Past in Modern Britain. Oxford University Press, 2004.
