= Brother Jonathan (disambiguation) =

Brother Jonathan is an iconic figure and emblem of the states of New England.

Brother Jonathan may also refer to:

- Brother Jonathan (novel), an 1825 book by American author John Neal
- Brother Jonathan (newspaper), a periodical published in New York City from 1842 to 1862
- Brother Jonathan (steamer), an American paddle steamer launched in 1850, sunk in 1865, and wreck discovered in 1993

== See also ==
- My Brother Jonathan (disambiguation)
- Jonathan (1 Samuel), the best friend of King David of Israel
