= Sea Horse (restaurant) =

Restaurant in Helsinki, Finland

Coordinates: 60°9′32″N 24°56′47″E

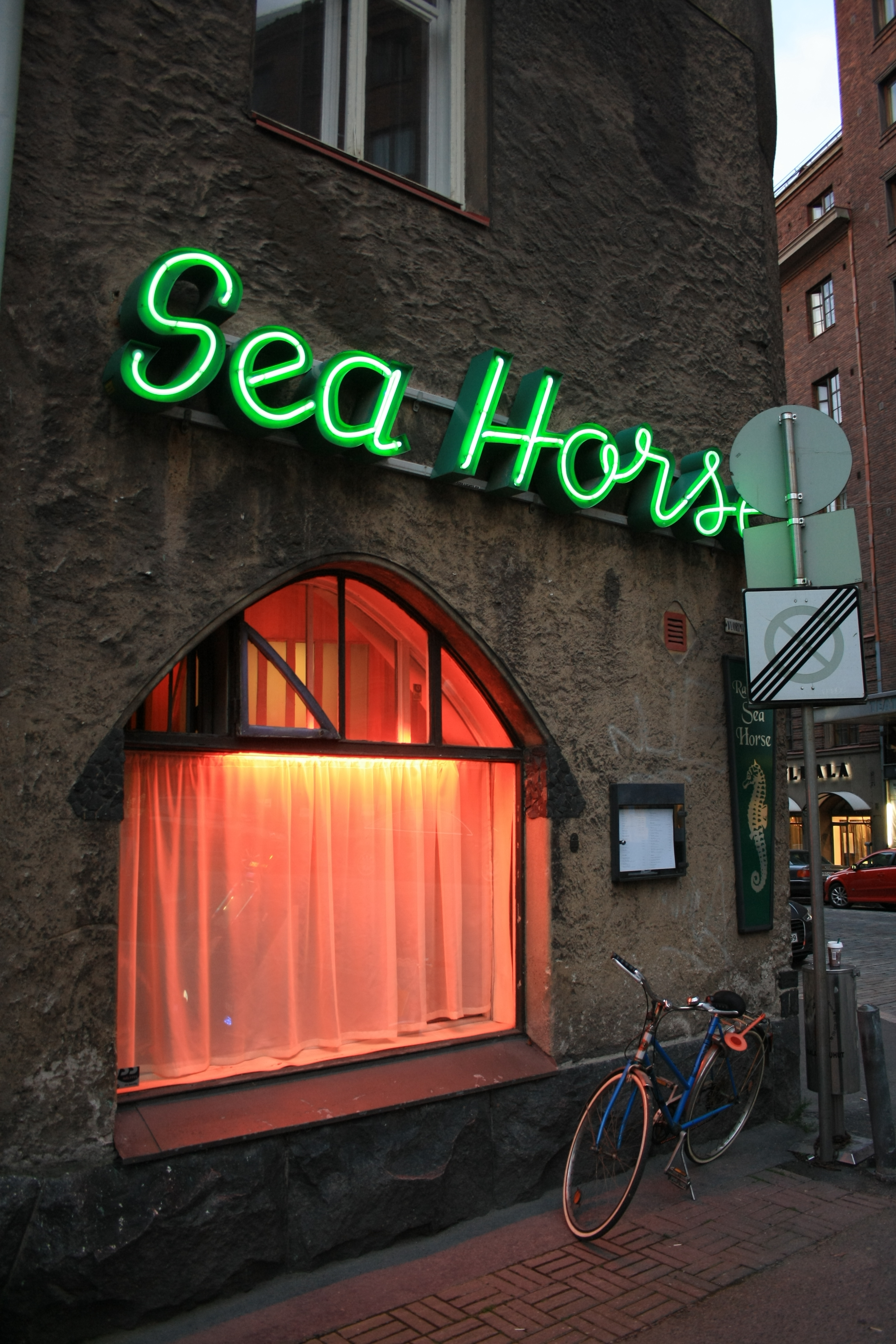
Restaurant Sea Horse from the outside.

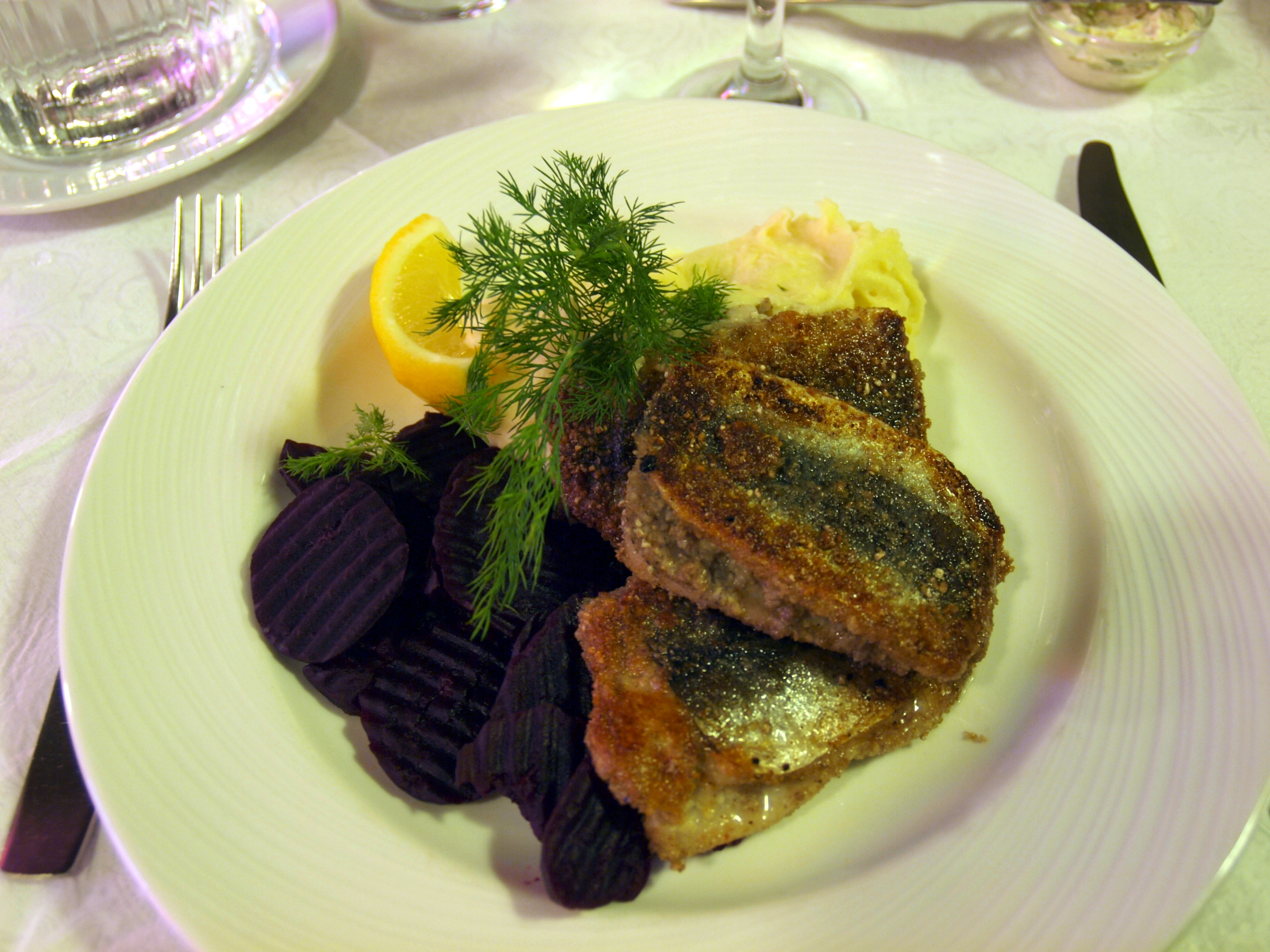
Sea Horse's famous steaks of Baltic herring.

Sea Horse is a restaurant in Ullanlinna, Helsinki, Finland, founded in 1934. Since its founding, it has paid attention to the traditional Finnish restaurant culture with both its interior and its menu. It is colloquially called Sikala (The Pigsty). It is located at Kapteeninkatu 11.

The restaurant's customers have included sailors, cultural people, and everything in between. According to journalist Jouni Lompolo, pen name "Origo", you can meet everyone from Nobel Prize winners to men in the street in the restaurant.

The staff has included numerous personalities. Gunnar Salenius, connected with the Jäger Movement, worked as the doorman in the 1930s.Pirre Pasanen, daughter of director and inventor Spede Pasanen, was the chief restaurateur of Sea Horse for a year after her father's death.

In 2003, an extensional cabinet called Musta hevonen ("the black horse") was opened. The cabinet includes Kimmo Kaivanto's painting Punaista ja mustaa. On the back wall of the main restaurant hall, there is a painting of two sea horses, which has two theories relating to its birth. According to one theory, art students who had broken in the restaurant in the 1940s had painted it. According to the other theory, a broke art student had paid his restaurant bill by creating the painting.

The most popular dishes on the menu include fried herrings, cabbage rolls, pyttipanna, meatballs and Wiener Schnitzel à la maison. The onion steak has been a classic dish on the menu for over 40 years, even mentioned in literature.

Famous regular customers of "Sikala" have included, in addition to Jouni Lompolo and Kimmo Kaivanto, quiz show host Jyrki Otila, poet Pentti Saaritsa and traffic reporter Esko Riihelä. Other famous customers have included poet Pablo Neruda, philosopher Jean-Paul Sartre and jazz musician Dizzy Gillespie.
