= My Brother Jonathan (novel) =

1928 novel

- First edition (UK)
- Author: Francis Brett Young
- Language: English
- Genre: Drama
- Publisher: Heinemann (London); Knopf (New York)
- Publication date: 1928
- Media type: Print

My Brother Jonathan is a 1928 novel by the British writer Francis Brett Young. It portrays the life of an idealistic young doctor working in the Black Country before the First World War, forced to deal with the consequences of his irresponsible brother Harold.

The Prime Minister Stanley Baldwin was a fan of Young's work, and took a copy of My Brother Jonathan to Chequers with him shortly after its publication.

== Adaptations ==
In 1948 it was made into a film My Brother Jonathan directed by Harold French and starring Michael Denison and Dulcie Gray. In 1985 it was adapted for a BBC television series of the same name with Daniel Day-Lewis in the lead role.

== Bibliography ==
- Birch, Dinah. The Oxford Companion to English Literature. Oxford University Press, 2009.
- Cannadine, David. In Churchill's Shadow: Confronting the Past in Modern Britain. Oxford University Press, 2004.
- Goble, Alan. The Complete Index to Literary Sources in Film. Walter de Gruyter, 1999.
