= Margaret Johnston =

Australian actress (1914–2002)

- Born: Margaret Annette McCrie Johnston; 10 August 1914; Sydney, New South Wales, Australia
- Died: 19 June 2002 (aged 87); Kingston upon Thames, London, England
- Occupation: Actress
- Years active: 1936–1968
- Spouse: Albert Parker (m. 1946; died 1974)
- Relatives: Angela Scoular (niece)

Margaret Johnston (10 August 1914 – 19 June 2002) was an Australian actress. Johnston was best known for her stage performances, but also appeared in 12 films and a handful of TV productions before retiring from acting in 1968 to devote herself to running a theatrical agency.

== Early life ==
Johnston was the second of three daughters born in Australia to English parents. She was educated at the North Sydney Girls High School, then at the University of Sydney where she studied law. Johnston had shown an interest and aptitude for drama from an early age acting in various school productions before working professionally in Sydney's theatres. It was reported that her oft-stated ambition at this time was "to move to Europe, to learn her craft, and to lose her (Australian) accent." In 1936, Johnston (accompanied by her sisters) travelled to Britain in order to pursue her career. She was accepted as a student by the Royal Academy of Dramatic Art, where she was tutored by Stefan Hock.

== Stage career ==
Johnston's first role on the West End stage was a minor part in a 1939 production of Saloon Bar, a comedy-thriller. She followed this with a period in repertory theatre, before being cast in a 1942 production of Murder Without Crime at London's Comedy Theatre. A box-office hit, the production ran for over a year. In 1944 Johnston played opposite Fay Compton in The Last of Summer at the Phoenix Theatre. Her performance, especially in an acrimonious verbal duel with Compton at the play's climax, was much praised and drew the attention of influential theatrical impresario Binkie Beaumont, who signed her for his agency H.M. Tennent Ltd., then London's leading theatrical management company.

In 1946, Johnston played the lead role of Kitty Duval in The Time of Your Life at the Lyric Hammersmith, followed in 1948 by a stage production of The Barretts of Wimpole Street in which she portrayed Elizabeth Barrett, a performance which earned her further critical appreciation, although the production itself was thought lacklustre. Critic Alan Dent noted that "the one exception among the general cowed lethargy of the Barretts is Elizabeth herself...she is sincere, touching, awakened."

Johnston appeared as Alma Winemiller in a 1951 production of Tennessee Williams' Summer and Smoke, initially at the Lyric then transferring to the Duchess Theatre. This performance drew some of the best notices of her career, with the Daily Herald saying Johnston "...gave a performance of tender brilliance. It was her best work to date", while the Daily Mirror described her as "probably our finest young actress".

From 1956 Johnston appeared in several productions at the Royal Shakespeare Theatre in Stratford-upon-Avon, playing Desdemona in Othello, Portia in The Merchant of Venice and Isabella in Measure for Measure. Two roles in 1959, in Sugar in the Morning at the Royal Court and a rare venture into domestic comedy with The Ring of Truth at the Savoy Theatre, marked her last stage appearances until 1966, when she starred as Lady Macbeth in Michael Benthall's production of Macbeth at the Chichester Festival Theatre in what would prove to be her last stage role.

== Film and television career ==
Johnston made her screen debut in the film The Prime Minister (1941), in a supporting role as one of the daughters of Benjamin Disraeli, played by John Gielgud. Following her stage successes between 1942 and 1944, she returned to film in the Rex Harrison star-vehicle The Rake's Progress (1945), with the film critic of London's Evening News noting: "Fair-haired, blue eyed and willowy, she can act with force or reduce you to the verge of tears. Her voice alone would be worth a fortune in Hollywood." Johnston starred with Dulcie Gray and Kieron Moore in a psychological melodrama A Man About the House (1947), which was a popular success.

One of Johnston's best known film roles came in the adaptation of Francis Brett Young's novel Portrait of Clare (1950), another box-office success. The following year brought her most high-profile screen appearance, as Robert Donat's long-suffering second wife in the star-studded The Magic Box (1951), made as a project of the Festival of Britain. Johnston was very complimentary about the René Clément-directed Knave of Hearts (1954), a Franco-British co-production of which she said: "The director was brilliant...it was a very sophisticated European film." Less felicitous was Ealing's Touch and Go (US: The Light Touch, 1955), a farce in which – somewhat ironically in Johnston's case – she and Jack Hawkins played an English couple making plans to emigrate to Australia. Despite early enthusiasm for the venture from the Australian press in particular (The Age wrote: "For years this versatile and exquisitely beautiful Australian actress...has been wasted...playing dowdy middle-aged frumps. This role may well take her right to the top...at long last.)" the finished product turned out to be a dud, a failure both with critics and filmgoers, and was Johnston's last screen appearance for several years.

Johnston returned to the screen via the unexpected medium of the horror film Night of the Eagle (1962). It was a successful film, but was not to Johnston's personal taste. She later stated: "I hated that. It was popular, but it wasn't the sort of film I enjoyed doing." She then appeared in Girl in the Headlines (1963) and Life at the Top (1965), which was more to her liking. ("I did enjoy that. My character was a slut...who wore terrible, loose, awful suits and had a lot of dogs around her.") Her penultimate screen appearance was in a detective drama The Psychopath (1966) and her final acting role in any medium was Sebastian (1968), another role she said she disliked, which she had only accepted as a favour to producer Michael Powell.

In tandem with her stage and screen appearances, Johnston also played in eight television productions between 1951 and 1964. These were all one-off productions for BBC and ITV drama strands, featuring works by such as Shakespeare, George Bernard Shaw, Noël Coward and Jean Cocteau.

== Later life ==
In 1946, Johnston had married Albert Parker, an American film director who had moved to Britain in the early 1930s and had directed several British films before establishing a very successful theatrical agency business (Al Parker Ltd.) in London. Parker was 27 years older than Johnston, and by the mid-1960s was in declining health. From 1965, Johnston was effectively running the business herself and decided, following her appearance in Sebastian, to give up her acting career in order to manage the agency full-time. Following Parker's death in August 1974, Johnston continued to run the business for over 20 years, handling clients such as James Mason, Helen Mirren and Frank Finlay, until her own health started to fail.

The marriage between Johnston and Parker was childless. Johnston died in a nursing home in Kingston upon Thames, London on 19 June 2002, aged 87.

== Birthdate ==
During her professional career, Johnston always gave her year of birth as 1918. Although this would have made her only 18 years old when she moved to Britain – and therefore too young to have studied at the University of Sydney before her departure from Australia – contemporary accounts during her acting career recorded her as four years younger than her actual age, and the 1918 birthdate was also erroneously quoted in some obituaries which gave her age on death as 83.

== Filmography ==
- 1941 : The Prime Minister – dir. Thorold Dickinson
- 1945 : The Rake's Progress – dir. Sidney Gilliat
- 1947 : A Man About the House – dir. Leslie Arliss
- 1950 : Portrait of Clare – dir. Lance Comfort
- 1951 : The Magic Box – dir. John Boulting
- 1954 : Knave of Hearts – dir. René Clément
- 1955 : Touch and Go – dir. Michael Truman
- 1962 : Night of the Eagle – dir. Sidney Hayers
- 1963 : Girl in the Headlines – dir. Michael Truman
- 1965 : Life at the Top – dir. Ted Kotcheff
- 1966 : The Psychopath – dir. Freddie Francis
- 1968 : Sebastian – dir. David Greene

== Television productions ==
- 1951 : Androcles and the Lion
- 1952 : The Taming of the Shrew (BBC Sunday Night Theatre – live production, not recorded)
- 1952 : Autumn Crocus (BBC Sunday Night Theatre – as above)
- 1960 : Looking for Garrow (BBC Sunday Night Play)
- 1960 : The Shrike (ITV Play of the Week)
- 1962 : The Typewriter (ITV Play of the Week)
- 1964 : That's Where the Town Is Going (ITV Armchair Theatre)
- 1964 : The Vortex (ITV Play of the Week)
