= Francis Brett Young =

English novelist, poet, playwright, and composer (1884–1954)

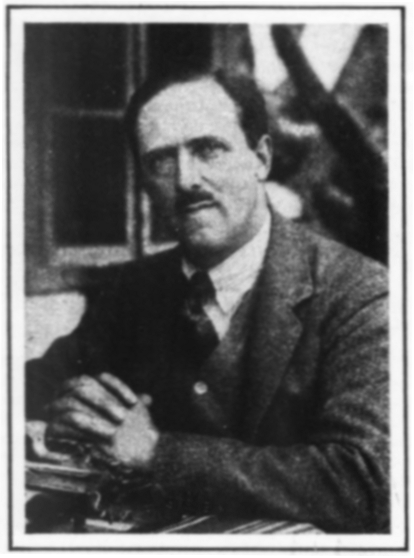
Image of Francis Brett

Francis Brett Young (29 June 1884 – 28 March 1954) was an English novelist, poet, playwright, composer, doctor and soldier.

== Life ==
Francis Brett Young was born in Halesowen, Worcestershire. He received his early education at Iona, a private school in Sutton Coldfield. His father, Thomas Brett Young, was a doctor and his mother also came from a medical family, so it was natural that he go to the school for the sons of doctors, Epsom College. He was there when, at fourteen, he suffered the death of his beloved mother. He later went on to train at the University of Birmingham to become a qualified physician. He met his future wife, Jessie Hankinson, while he was lodging at Edgbaston in Birmingham and she was training at Anstey College of Physical Education, then housed in nearby The Leasowes (the former home of William Shenstone, the author he most admired).

He started medical practice on the steamship SS Kintuck, on a long voyage to the Far East. He returned with the money to purchase his own medical practice at Cleveland House, Brixham, Devon, in 1907. Established in his first secure job, he was able to be secretly married to Hankinson in December 1908. She was also a singer and he accompanied her, as well as composing two sets of songs for her, published in 1912 and 1913.

His first novel, Undergrowth, was a collaboration with his younger brother, Eric. Eric subsequently forged a writing career of his own which, while less successful, produced novels such as The Murder at Fleet and The Dancing Beggars.

During the First World War he saw service in German East Africa in the Royal Army Medical Corps (he was a medical officer of the 2nd Rhodesia Regiment), but was invalided out in 1918, and no longer able to practise medicine. His own account of these wartime events is given in his book Marching on Tanga; passages censored from that book were later covertly used in his novel Jim Redlake.

Unable to work as a doctor, he decided to devote himself to his writing, and in 1919 he began the first of his Mercian novels. From 1920, the couple went to live in Capri until 1929 but also travelled widely, including trips to South Africa, the United States and summers in the Lake District of England. They returned to live in England, initially as neighbours of fellow novelist Hugh Walpole in the Lake District. Here they lived in Esthwaite Lodge, a country house, still standing, south of Hawkshead on the west side of Esthwaite Water. Then, from 1932, they settled at the dilapidated Craycombe House, Fladbury, Worcestershire, which he was able to buy and slowly renovate due to his continuing success as a writer. His income also enabled him to spend the winters in Capri, which was vital due to his poor health. This changed as Italy had become fascist and the Second World War approached, and in 1937 he purchased Talland House between Looe and Polperro as an alternative winter retreat. When war came in 1939, Craycombe House was requisitioned by the Red Cross and turned into a convalescent home for the armed services.

In 1944, near to the war's end, he published his epic poem The Island, recounting in verse the whole history of Britain from the Bronze Age to the Battle of Britain. The entire first edition of 23,500 sold out immediately, even in wartime conditions, and was then reprinted.

The winters and wartime privations in England had taken their toll on his poor health. In October 1944, having seen The Island through to publication, he had a serious heart attack. At the end of the Second World War he moved to Montagu in the Klein Karoo, South Africa. The climate suited him, and he was even able to complete the writing of a non-fiction guide book for the South African Tourist Board.

== Death ==
He died in Cape Town on 28 March 1954, aged 69. He was cremated and his ashes were returned to England, and are buried in Worcester Cathedral.

== Work ==
Like many authors he used the places and occupations he knew as the backdrops for his work. There is much description of the sea, war and medical practice set in places as far apart as the West Midlands and West Country of England and South Africa.

His first published novel Deep Sea (1914) has Brixham as a background while Portrait of Clare (1927) is set in the West Midlands, as are several of his works from this period. The Iron Age (1916) is set partly in Ludlow, Shropshire.

== Mercian novels ==
The central project of Francis Brett Young's career was a series of linked novels set in a loosely fictionalised version of the English West Midlands and Welsh Borders. The Mercian novels were originally inspired by the construction of Birmingham Corporation's Elan Valley Reservoirs from 1893 to 1904, and the country traversed by their associated aqueduct.

The Black Diamond (1921) tells the story of a labourer working on the aqueduct in the region around Knighton, while The House Under the Water (1932) deals at length with the construction of the reservoirs themselves. The series expanded into a wide-ranging study of Midlands society from the 1890s through to the outbreak of the Second World War. Although linked by recurring characters, each of the Mercian novels can be read as an independent work. They range in style from the atmospheric psychological horror of Cold Harbour (1924; praised by H. P. Lovecraft) to the romantic family saga of Portrait of Clare (1927), which won that year's James Tait Black Memorial Prize.

Like Thomas Hardy's Wessex novels, the Mercian novels are unified by their setting—a semi-fictionalised realisation of an actual geographical region. While some actual place-names appear unchanged (e.g., Kidderminster, Ludlow, Malvern, Shrewsbury, Worcester), most locations appear under a fictional name (Birmingham = North Bromwich, Halesowen = Halesby; Dudley = Dulston; River Elan = River Garon). Other locations appear to be fictional conflations of various real-world places; e.g., the Black Country town of Wednesford; resembling in many respects the actual town of Wednesbury but located by the author in the Stour Valley (and seemingly unrelated to Hednesford, near Cannock), and the hamlet of Cold Harbour; modelled on Wassell Grove near Hagley but described by him as overlooking the Black Country.

== Main works ==
- Undergrowth (with Eric Brett Young) (1913)
- Deep Sea (1914)
- The Dark Tower (1915)
- The Iron Age (1916)
- Marching on Tanga (With General Smuts in East Africa) (1917), war memoir
- The Crescent Moon (1918)
- The Young Physician (1919)
- Poems, 1916-1918 (1919)
- The Tragic Bride (1920)
- The Black Diamond (1921)
- The Red Knight (1921) Collins, London
- Pilgrim's Rest (1922)
- Cold Harbour (1924)
- Woodsmoke (1924)
- Sea Horses (1925)
- Portrait of Clare (1927)
- The Key of Life (1928)
- My Brother Jonathan (1928)
- Black Roses (1929)
- Jim Redlake (1930)
- Mr. and Mrs. Pennington (1931)
- The House Under the Water (1932)
- This Little World (1934)
- White Ladies (1935)
- Far Forest (1936)
- Portrait of a Village (1937)
- They Seek a Country (1937)
- Dr. Bradley Remembers (1938)
- The City of Gold (1939)
- Mr. Lucton's Freedom (1940)
- A Man About the House (1942), play and film both 1947
- The Island (1944) (written in epic verse)
- In South Africa (1952)
- Wistanslow (1956 - published posthumously)

== Archives ==
Archives of Francis Brett Young are held at the Cadbury Research Library, University of Birmingham. The archive collection includes a large number of letters, many of which are from prominent figures of the twentieth century, as well as typescript copies of his poems.

== Film and television adaptations ==
Several of his books were adapted for film and television, including My Brother Jonathan (1948) starring Michael Denison, Dulcie Gray and James Robertson Justice; and Portrait of Clare (1950) starring Margaret Johnston, Richard Todd and Robin Bailey. Both films used Aston Rowant railway station in Oxfordshire as a filming location.

In 1985 My Brother Jonathan was adapted into a British television series starring Daniel Day-Lewis and Barbara Kellerman.
