= Grizedale Hall =

Country house in the Lake District of England

Coordinates: 54.3397°N 3.0221°W

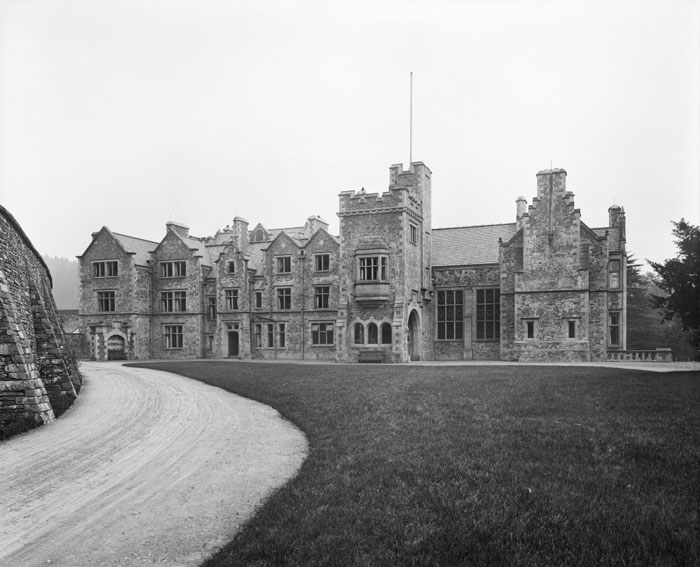
Grizedale Hall in 1907

Grizedale Hall was a large country house at Grizedale, Hawkshead, in the Lake District in Cumbria, England. After two earlier Grizedale Halls had preceded, it was built anew in 1905 in the style of Gothic Revival architecture. During World War II it became No 1 Prisoner-of-war camp to hold German officers and was finally pulled down in 1957.

== Old Grizedale Hall (built 17th century) ==
The Grizedale estate had been acquired by the Rawlinson family in 1614 who kept it for some generations and it is assumed that the old Grizedale Hall had been built around that time. In the mid-eighteenth century Richard Ford came into possession of part of the Grizedale estate, though probably not of the hall itself, which by that time had become a farmhouse, known as the Grizedale Hall Farm. In the 1800s the old hall was demolished and a new farm house was built on its site which exists today under the name Grizedale Home Farm.

== Grizedale New Hall (built 1841) ==
In approximately 1745 Richard Ford built a new home in Grizedale known as Ford Lodge situated 250 yards east of the old hall. His great-grandson Montague Ainslie who inherited Grizedale estate in the early nineteenth century turned his family's country cottage into a larger residence in 1841, which became known as Grizedale New Hall. It was pulled down around 1904 to make way for a large country house.

== Grizedale Hall (built 1905) ==
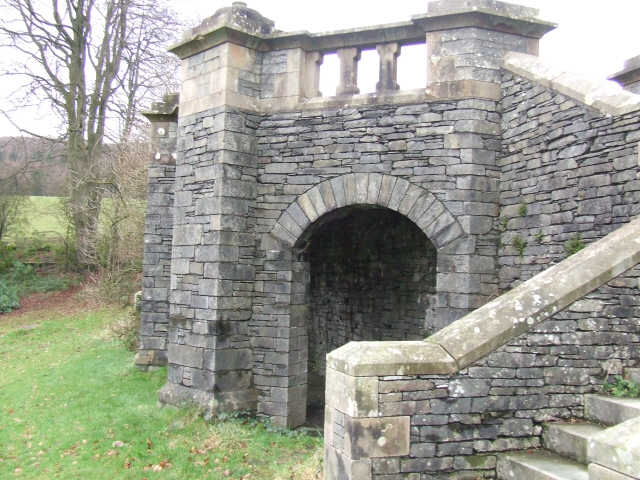
Remaining garden terrace of Grizedale Hall in 2007

In 1903 Harold Brocklebank, a wealthy Liverpool based merchant and shipping magnate bought Grizedale estate. He was born in 1853, being the third son of Sir Thomas Brocklebank, 1st Baronet. After the old hall was pulled down, Harold Brocklebank completely rebuilt Grizedale Hall in 1905, the interior design having been completed by 1907. The architects of the new stone-built 40-room mansion in neo-gothic style were Walker, Carter & Walker of Windermere. Brocklebank inhabited Grizedale Hall with his wife Mary Ellen Brogden, three daughters and two sons until his death in 1936, when the hall and the 4,500 acre estate were taken up by the Forestry Commission. After serving as the first prisoner-of-war camp in the United Kingdom from 1939 to 1946, the hall stood empty. Due to its high maintenance costs the Forestry Commission auctioned off the fittings, fireplaces and staircases and demolished the hall in 1957, leaving only the single-storey adjoining building with storage rooms on the east side of the hall as well as the garden terrace. For several years the grounds were used as a campsite by the Camping and Caravanning Club. Some architectural remains of the hall like the walls and stairs of the massive garden terrace and the close with its gates can still be seen today, the car-park of the Grizedale Forest visitor centre being placed on top of the internal side of the former house.

== No 1 POW camp ==
During World War II Grizedale Hall was commandeered by the War Office and became officially known as No 1 POW Camp (Officers) Grizedale Hall since 1939, to hold the most elite of German POWs. As many of the prisoners were rescued survivors from sunken U-boats, it also became known as the "U-Boat Hotel". A well-known prisoner was Otto Kretschmer, Germany's most successful U-boat captain until his capture.

The camp incorporated watchtowers, a double perimeter fence that encircled the house and around thirty huts. Together these could hold around 300 prisoners. The camp also had a kitchen garden, a football pitch and a library containing German-language books. The fighter pilot Franz Baron von Werra was initially held there and made a famous escape attempt in late 1940, inspiring the story of the 1957 film The One That Got Away, Grizedale Hall serving as the film site just shortly before its destruction. Other known prisoners were rear-admiral Hans Voss, SS-general Maximilian von Herff, General Wilhelm Ritter von Thoma and U-boat commander Werner Lott. The camp was emptied in 1946 of all remaining prisoners to be repatriated to Germany and Austria. The POW camp Grizedale Hall also inspired the 1970 war drama film The McKenzie Break and is site of the 1989 thriller A Cage of Eagles by James Follet. Italian POWs were also housed here, some carrying out gardening and other jobs in the local area.

== The Yan ==
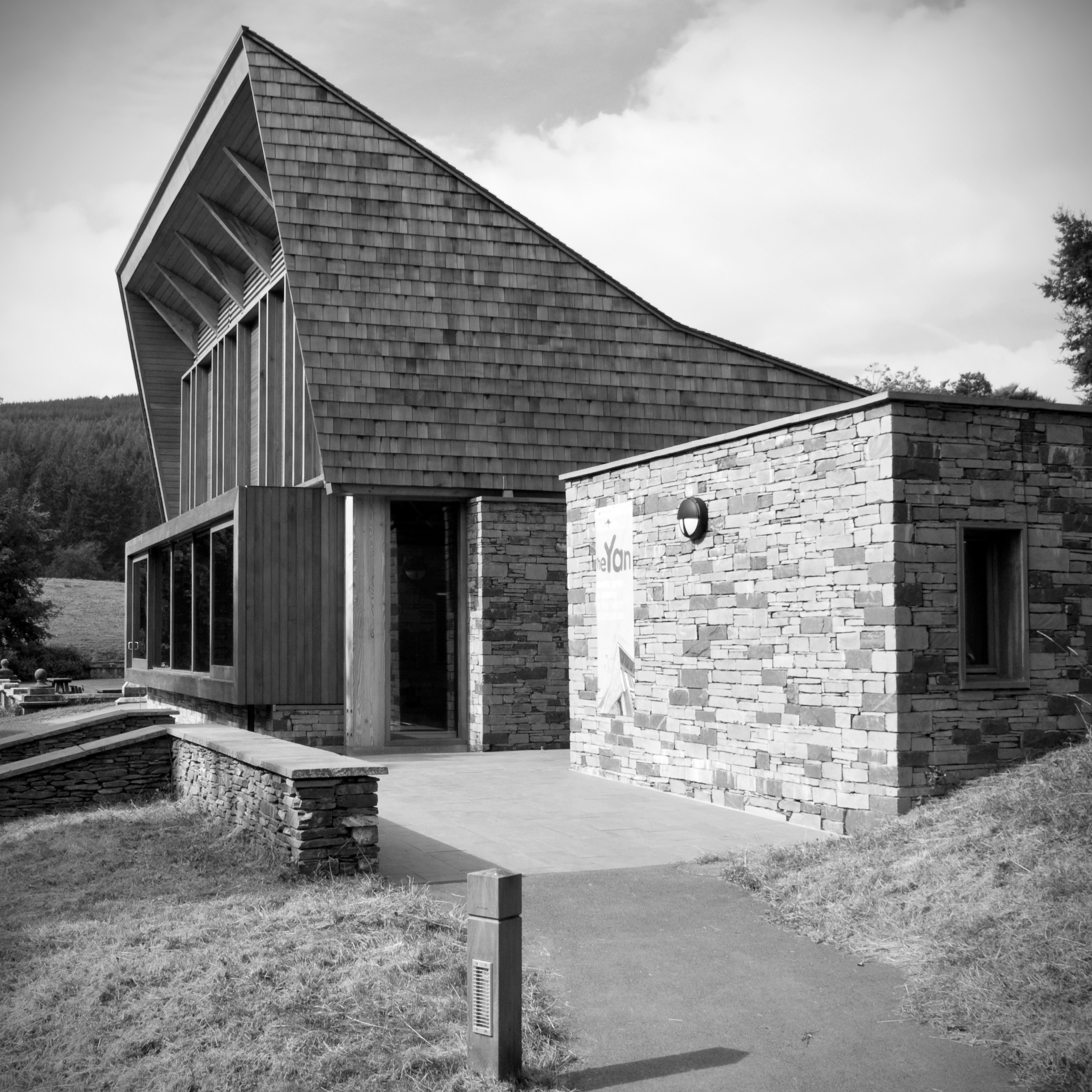
The Yan in 2009

A new building for the Grizedale Forest visitor centre called "The Yan" (from yan tan tethera) was built in 2008 in extension of the remaining annex to the former hall, a construction of timber and natural stone, designed by Sutherland Hussey Architects of Edinburgh and opened on 23 June 2008 by Lord Clark of Windermere. Since 2025 it houses the Grizedale Observatory.

== Sources ==
- Nicola Gaskell BA, North Pennines Archaeology Ltd: Archaeological desk-based assessment and site visit for a proposed orientation building at the visitor centre, Grizedale, Ambleside, Cumbria. Client Reports No. CP/316/06. For the Forestry Commission. Nenthead Mines Heritage Centre, Nenthead 2006.
- History Satterthwaite Parish Community Website, retrieved 30 March 2014
- 21 Photos taken ca. 1907, National Monuments Record, Heritage Explorer, retrieved 30 March 2014
- Grizedale Hall POW-camp The Battle of Britain London Monument, retrieved 30 March 2014
- Brocklebank Family at Grizedale Hall UK Ancestors, retrieved 30 March 2014
