= Selston High School =

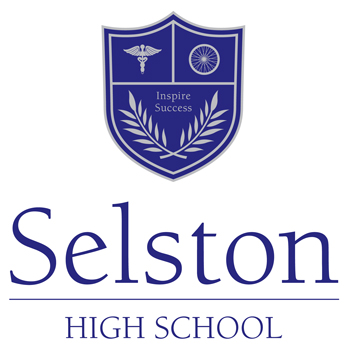

Location
- Chapel Road; Selston; Nottinghamshire, NG16 6BW; England
- Coordinates: 53°04′21″N 1°18′26″W

Information
- Type: Academy
- Motto: Inspire Success
- Local authority: Nottinghamshire
- Department for Education URN: 142725 Tables
- Ofsted: Reports
- Headteacher: David Broomhead
- Staff: 52
- Gender: Mixed
- Age: 11 to 16
- Enrolment: 723
- Houses: Harby, Middleton, Cresswell & Beauvale
- Colours: Red, Purple, Yellow, Green
- Website: https://www.selston.ttct.co.uk/

Selston High School is a mixed secondary school that educates students aged 11–16. It is located in Selston, Nottinghamshire, England. The headteacher is Mr David Broomhead.

== History ==
The school was previously called Matthew Holland School, named after the chairman of the local education committee at the time of its construction, who lived locally. The subsequent name change was the subject of much debate as it had been known as Matthew Holland for more than half a century. The building was constructed in the late 1930s, and during the war was on standby for use as a hospital until being established as an educational institution in late 1945 or early 1946.

After a long campaign, the school obtained community college status and changed its name to Selston Arts and Community College in 2006. It subsequently received specialist funding which not only supported the arts departments, but was a catalyst for many improvements benefiting the whole student community. In September 2012 the school opened with a new brand, uniform and a name that signalled the start of a new year set to be full of changes under the leadership of the new headteacher, Mr Kevin Gaiderman. The school was renamed to Selston High School.

Previously a community school administered by Nottingham Government, Selston High School was converted to academy status in April 2016. The school is now part of the Two Counties Trust which includes Ashfield School and Swanwick Hall School. However Selston High School continues to coordinate with Nottinghamshire County Council for admissions.

In September 2015 Mr John Maher formerly Deputy Headteacher at Ashfield School became headteacher at Selston following the departure of Mr Kevin Gaiderman.

== Demographics ==
The College is a mixed school with around 800 pupils. The Primary schools which feed Selston High are Holly Hill Primary School, Jacksdale Primary School, Bagthorpe Primary School, Underwood CofE Primary School, and Brinsley Primary School. Over 90% of students directly transfer from these schools to the school.

== Academic performance ==
Having previously been deemed 'Satisfactory' Selston High School was found to be 'Good' in all areas by Ofsted in its February 2014 and 2019 inspection.

In 2016 the school was the only local state school to be awarded 4 star status on the basis of its official performance data by an independent website SchoolGuide.co.uk

In its 2015 GCSE Maths results 69% of students made 3+ levels of progress with 41% making above expected progress. These results have risen from 2014 and are well above the national average.

In its 2015 GCSE English results 69% of students made 3+ levels of progress with 433% making above expected progress. These results have risen from 2014 and are in line with the national average.

In 2015 67% of students achieved 5 or more GCSEs at grade C or higher. This score is above the 2015 national average and has risen from last year's figure.

In 2015 13% of students achieved 5 or more GCSEs at grade A or A*.

In 2015 the school Best 8 Value Added Score was 1001.1 this is above the national average figure of 1000 indicating students make above average progress during their time at the school

== Premises ==
The school has a Main Hall with a stage, tiered seating and sound desk, tennis and netball courts, a large playing field with running track and lots more. Students also have the use of Selston Leisure Centre and the public library next door.

In the past, the state of the school was always upon the agenda of school council meetings since it had long been criticised by the students for the building's aged looks. However, the school made an effort to change the working environment for the students; they installed new carpets, new desks, renewed the furnishings in all the science rooms, turned Room One into a conference centre and created a high tech visitors reception area.

The school offers many subjects to students, including Art & Design, Computer Science, Drama, French, Geography, History, PE, Photography, Spanish, Triple (Further) Science, BTEC Health & Social Care, City & Guilds Construction, WJEC Engineering, WJEC Hospitality & Catering, Music, OCR Sports Science, BTEC Travel & Tourism, and ORC IT.

== Notable former pupils ==
- Samantha Beckinsale (c.1977-82) Actress, daughter of Richard Beckinsale (best known for Porridge (1974 TV series)
- Liam Bailey (1994-1999), musician signed to Polydor Records.
- Kyle Ryde, (2008-2013), British Grand Prix motorcycle racer
- Molly Renshaw, (2007-2012), Team GB swimmer to compete in Rio 2016.
