= Robert J. Elliott =

British-Canadian mathematician

Robert James Elliott (born 1940) is a British-Canadian mathematician, known for his contributions to control theory, game theory, stochastic processes and mathematical finance.

He was schooled at Swanwick Hall Grammar School in Swanwick, Derbyshire and studied mathematics in which he earn a B.A. (1961) and M.A. (1965) at the University of Oxford, as well as a Ph.D (thesis Some results in spectral synthesis advised by John Hunter Williamson, 1965) and Sc.D. (1983) from the University of Cambridge.

He taught and conducted research at University of Newcastle (1964), Yale University (1965–66), University of Oxford (1966–68), University of Warwick (1969–73), Northwestern University (1972–73), University of Hull (1973–86), University of Alberta (1985–2001), University of Calgary (2001–2009) and University of Adelaide (2009–2013). Most recently, he has been working at University of South Australia as a research professor.

== Books ==
- Stochastic Processes, Finance and Control A Festschrift in Honor of Robert J Elliott (World Scientific Publishing, 2012)
- with Nigel Kalton, The Existence of Value for Differential Games (American Mathematical Society, 1972)
- Stochastic Calculus and Applications (Springer-Verlag, 1982)
- Viscosity Solutions and Optimal Control (Longman, 1987)
- Stokasticheski Analiz i evo Prilozeniya (M.I.R. Publications Moscow, 1986)
- with Lakhdar Aggoun and John B. Moore, Hidden Markov Models: Estimation and Control (Springer-Verlag, 1994)
- with P. Ekkehard Kopp, Mathematics of Financial Markets (Springer Verlag, 1999, in Hungarian 2000).
- with J. van der Hoek, Binomial Models in Finance (Springer Verlag, 2005)
- with Rogemar S. Mamon, Hidden Markov Models in Finance (Springer, 2007)
- with Samuel N. Cohen, Stochastic Calculus and Applications (Springer, 2015)
