= Gordon Reid (actor) =

Scottish actor (1939–2003)

- Born: James Gordon Reid; 8 June 1939; Hamilton, South Lanarkshire, Scotland
- Died: 26 November 2003 (aged 64); Earls Court, London, England
- Occupation: Actor
- Years active: 1963–2003

James Gordon Reid (8 June 1939 – 26 November 2003) was a Scottish actor.

== Early life and career ==
Reid was born in Hamilton, Lanarkshire, Scotland. Educated at the former Hamilton Academy he then trained at the Royal Scottish Academy of Music and Drama, graduating in 1962 with the silver medal for Acting.

His extensive acting credits included the chemist Angus Livingstone on the television series Doctor Finlay from 1993 to 1996. Other television credits included Doctor Who, Peak Practice, Lovejoy, and Taggart. Films included Leon the Pig Farmer (1992), The Others and Mansfield Park. On stage, he spent three years with the Royal Shakespeare Company and played in the West End production of Me and My Girl. A major radio credit was as Angel Two in the BBC serialisation of James Follett's Earthsearch dramas.

== Death ==
He collapsed and died on stage at the Finborough Theatre at Earls Court, London on the evening of 26 November 2003 halfway through Act Two of a performance of Samuel Beckett's Waiting for Godot in the role of Vladimir, aged 64.

== Filmography ==
Year	Title	Role	Notes
1980	Lady Killers	William Harper Minnoch	TV series (Episode 'Miss Madeleine Smith')
1992	Leon the Pig Farmer	Man	
1999	Mansfield Park	Dr. Winthrop	
2001	The Others	Assistant	
