= Hugh Wood (landowner) =

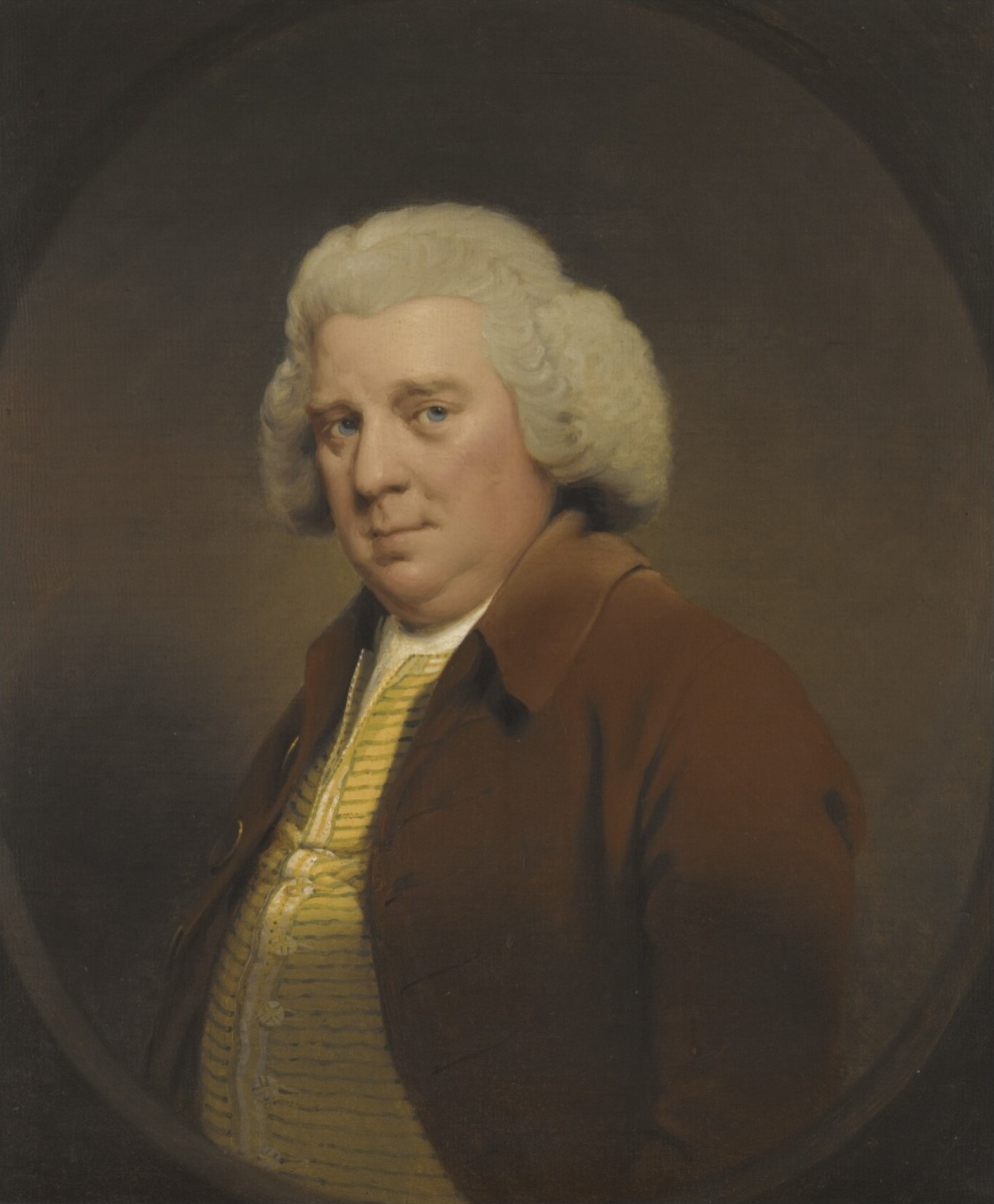
Hugh Wood, painting by Joseph Wright of Derby, 1789

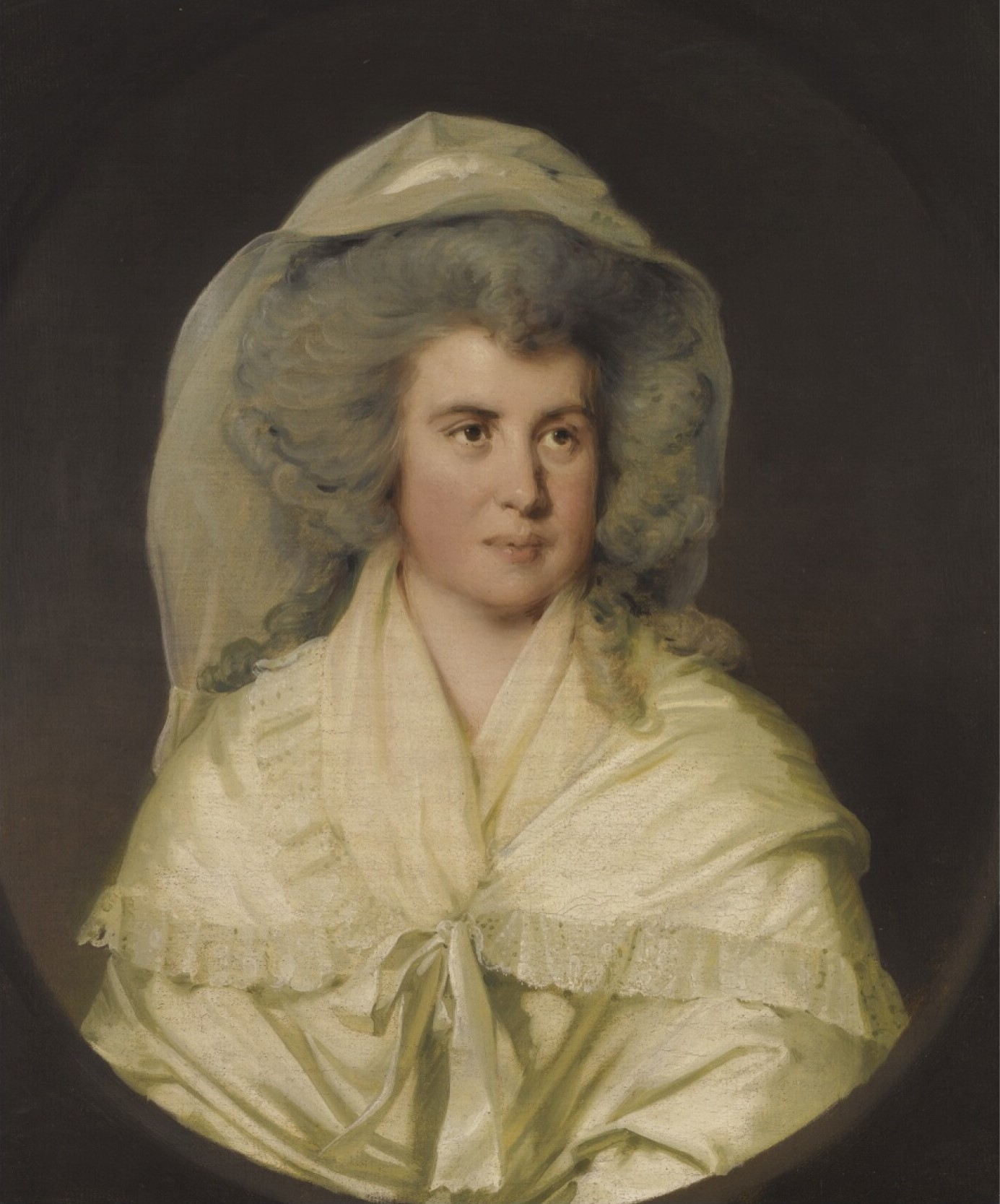
Mary Wood (née Peake), painting by Joseph Wright of Derby, 1789

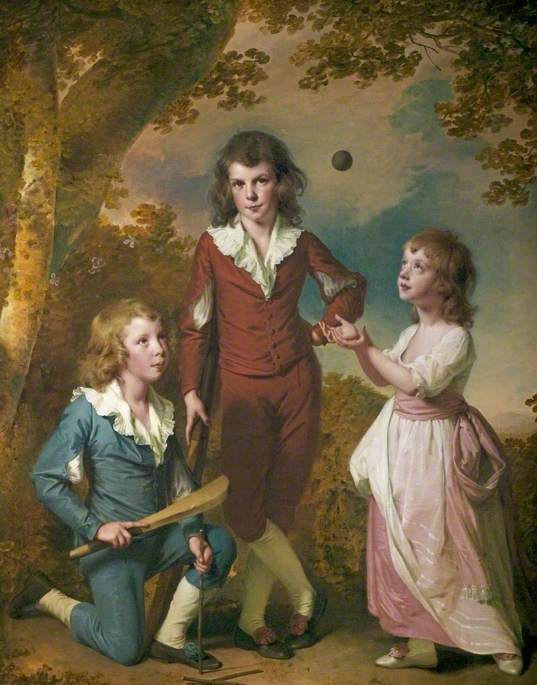
The Children of Hugh and Mary Wood of Swanwick, Derbyshire (Robert Wood b.1781, John Wood b.1776 & Mary Wood), painting by Joseph Wright of Derby

Hugh Wood (10 January 1736 – 24 January 1814) was a landowner of Derbyshire gentry, and ran collieries in the small village of Swanwick. Hugh Wood notably owned Swanwick Hall (a villa build by architect, Joseph Pickford) from 1772 onwards, and knew many important Derbyshire people at the time such as Joseph Wright, whom he was a patron of.

== Early life ==
Wood was born on 10 January 1736 to John and Martha Wood in Yellow’s Yard, Swanwick. He was raised alongside his two brothers, John (the eldest child) and Richard (the middle child), and lived at the Wood family home, a locally styled farmhouse constructed in 1676 (some parts of the house theorised to have been built earlier), made of local stone. It is now 110, 112 and 114 Derby Road.

Hugh's brother, John, became vicar of Chesterfield in 1765 and the domestic chaplain to William Cavendish, the 5th Duke Of Devonshire, at his home in Chatsworth, whilst Richard died young in 1759.

This meant that Hugh took on the family coal rights of the land surrounding, as well as management of several farms in the area.

== Swanwick Hall ==
Hugh married Sarah Rossington in 1769, and in 1771, Wood commissioned Derbyshire architect, Joseph Pickford, to build a new villa, south east of Swanwick, across from the Old Hall owned by the Wood Family (due to Derby Road not existing until 1812). It would be completed in 1772, the house would be three storeys high, speculated to have been five bays wide, and would be of handmade red brick, and minimal stone dressings made from gritstone, coming from the Horsley Castle Quarry, Coxbench.

He and his wife would move in, however, a year later, Sarah would die childless. Hugh remarried in March 1775, with his second wife being Mary Peake, Sarah’s cousin. Hugh would have all three of his children with her, that being John (1776), Robert (1781) and Mary (1780s?).

In 1778, Wood served on the grand jury for the Court of quarter sessions, including assessing prisoners for some capital offences.

Hugh, his wife, and their three children would be portrayed by Joseph Wright Of Derby in three large paintings from around 1789. The picture of the three children used to hang in the dining hall of the house, but is now displayed at Pickford's House Museum, Derby. The portraits of Hugh and Mary were auctioned online for £70,000 by Sotheby’s in 2010.

When extending his villa in its west wing in 1812, after the enclosure act of Alfreton, it would finally be given the name Swanwick Hall, due to a predecessor formerly belonging to the Turner family built in 1690, being demolished to make way for a new ‘Old Hall Farm’ on the site.

Also later in life, Hugh started to sell off his mineral rights over to the Morewood family of Alfreton Hall, and the Oake Family of Riddings by 1790, allowing for businesses such as the ‘Butterley Company’ owned by Benjamin Outram, to profit fully from colliery affairs. Although his son, Rev. John Wood, would continue to do the same, according to deeds of lease, the Wood family would continue to own many coal-lands until they left Swanwick in 1913.

Hugh Wood died 24 January 1814, and appeared on the Alfreton buried register on 1 February 1814.
