= Swanwick Hall School =

Location
- Derby Road; Swanwick; Alfreton, Derbyshire, DE55 1AE; England
- Coordinates: 53°02′42″N 1°23′31″W

Information
- Type: Academy
- Established: 1922
- Local authority: Derbyshire
- Department for Education URN: 142741 Tables
- Ofsted: Reports
- Headteacher: Emma Howard
- Gender: Mixed
- Age: 11 to 19
- Houses: Sycamore, Oak, Willow and Birch
- Colour: Red Black White
- Website: swanwickhall.derbyshire.sch.uk

Swanwick Hall School is a mixed secondary school and sixth form located in Swanwick, Alfreton, Derbyshire, England. In 2004 Ofsted noted that the school had strong university links and had Training School status. It was formerly a country house belonging to the local Wood family.

== History ==
=== The Hall (1771-1922) ===
The main building was constructed in 1771-72 by Joseph Pickford for Hugh Wood, a gentleman in Swanwick. It was expanded in 1812 to the west wing, with a new drawing room and tea room. This was around the same time the estate was expanded to thirty acres on the south east end of the newly opened Swanwick crossroads, due to the Alfreton Enclosure Act 1812 (52 Geo. 3 c. ciii).

It was expanded again and heavily modified in 1889, when it was expanded by an east wing, conservatory, flag room and a refronted south façade on the west wing. The Wood family started letting out the house in the late 1890’s, and started selling off parts of the Wood family estate in Derbyshire, and mainly left Swanwick by 1912. When J. W. H. Wood died in late 1919, his wife, Christina Mary Wood, sold off Swanwick Hall in 1920, over to Derbyshire County Council for £10,376.

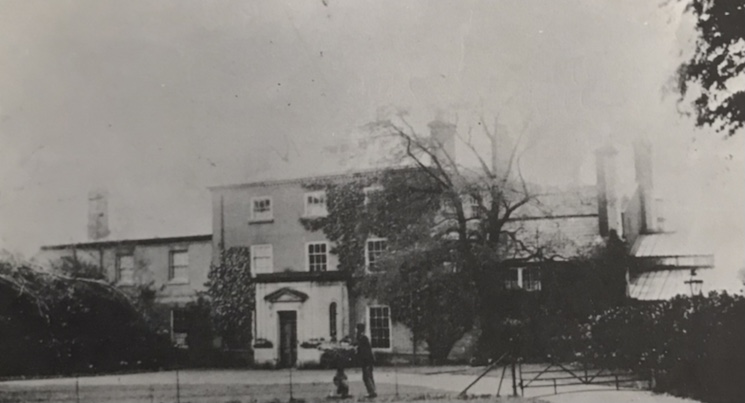
Swanwick Hall, view from the north park, c.1890’s.

It was known as the coeducational Swanwick Hall Grammar School from 1922, It had extensions designed by county council architect, G. Widdows, and was opened by the Duke Of Devonshire.

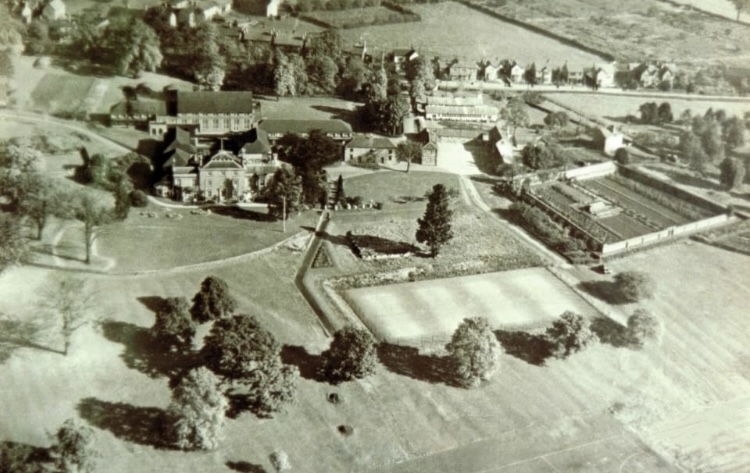
Swanwick Hall as a grammar school, entire site pictured, c.1940’s.

=== Comprehensive ===
The school became comprehensive in 1973. Previously a community school administered by Derbyshire County Council, Swanwick Hall School was converted to academy status in April 2016. The school is now part of the Two Counties Trust which includes Ashfield School and Selston High School. However, Swanwick Hall School continues to coordinate with Derbyshire County Council for admissions.

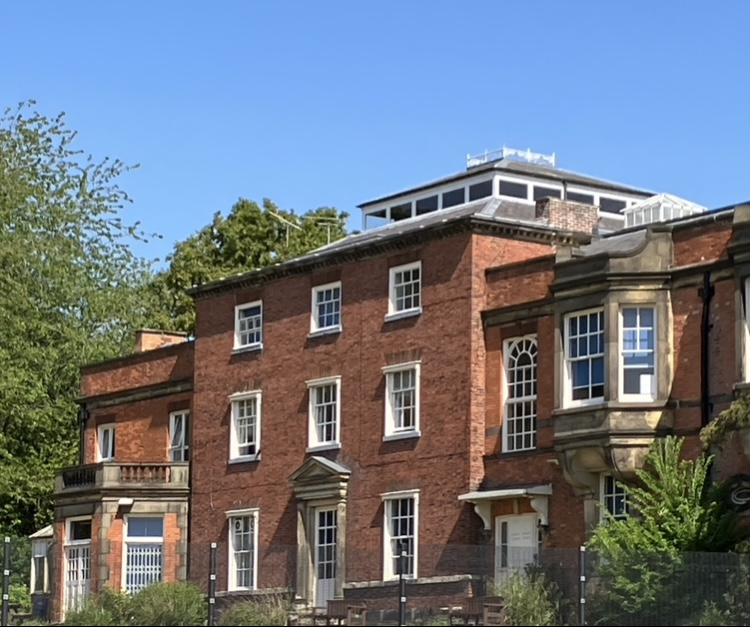
Swanwick Hall’s south facade, pictured in May 2023.

== Notable pupils ==
=== Swanwick Hall Grammar School ===
- Robert J. Elliott, mathematician
- Roger Elliott FRS, Wykeham Professor of Physics from 1974 to 1988 at the University of Oxford, and Chief Executive from 1988 to 1993 of Oxford University Press (OUP), cousin of Robert, and known for his Elliott formula
- Edwin Jowitt, former High Court judge
- Ben Connor, British Athlete & Tokyo 2021 Olympian - Marathon
- Stanley J Birkin, Educator, Professor of Information Systems from 1969 to 2007, Director of the Bear Stearns Research Centre, College of Business, University of South Florida.

== See also ==
- Listed buildings in Swanwick, Derbyshire
