= Sean Arnold =

English actor (1941–2020)

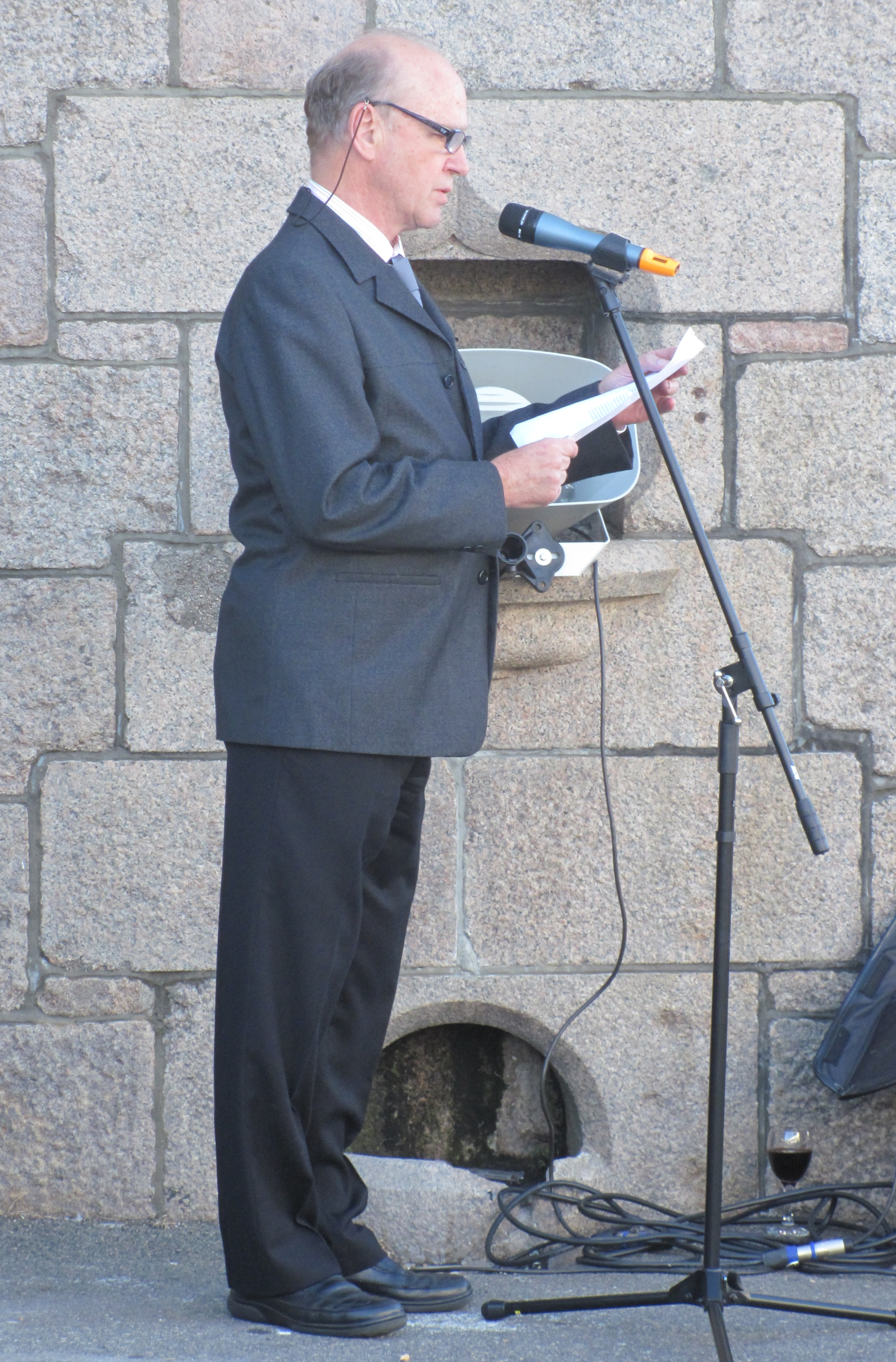
Sean Arnold in June 2010

Sean Arnold (30 January 1941 – 15 April 2020) was an English actor.

== Early life ==
Arnold was born in January 1941 in Wickwar, Gloucestershire, England.

== Career ==
Arnold is known for his roles as Mr. Llewelyn in Grange Hill in the 1970s and 1980s, and as Barney Crozier in the 1980s BBC television series Bergerac. He played Commander Telson in the 1981 BBC Radio 4 science fiction serial Earthsearch and the 1982 sequel Earthsearch II, and later appeared as the Chief Constable in Merseybeat. He also voiced every character in the 1984 James the Cat series. For his role as Harry Fisher in the BBC soap opera Doctors, he was nominated for Villain of the Year at the 2005 British Soap Awards.

Arnold's film credits include roles in North Sea Hijack (1979), Remembrance (1982), Haunters of the Deep (1984), Speaking of the Devil (1991), and Red Rose (2005).

== Death ==
Arnold died on 15th April 2020, aged 79 following a long illness.

== Filmography ==
Year	Title	Role	Notes
1980	North Sea Hijack	Schmidt	
1982	Remembrance	Landlord of the Antelope	
1984	Haunters of the Deep	Dave Shannon	
1991	Speaking of the Devil	Morrison	
1994	The Trial of Lord Lucan	John Aspinall	
2003	The Gospel of John	Elderly Priest	
2004	Red Rose	Edmund Burke	
2005	Under the Greenwood Tree	Farmer	
2008	Fuel	Agent Fox	(final film role)
