= Joseph Pickford =

English architect

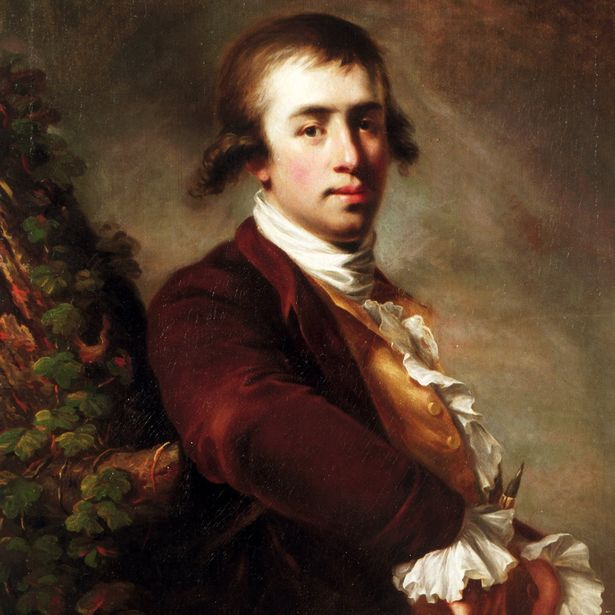
Joseph Pickford (1770) painted by Joseph Wright

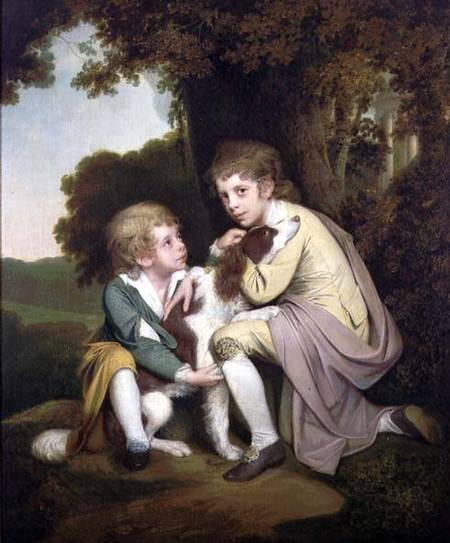
Joseph Pickford's children (Joseph on the left, Thomas on the right) painted by Joseph Wright in 1778

Joseph Pickford (bap. 6 October 1734 – 13 July 1782) was an English architect that mostly worked within the English county of Derbyshire, and was one of the leading provincial architects in the reign of George III. The house he designed for himself in Derby is now the Pickford's House Museum.

== Biography ==
Pickford was born in Warwickshire in 1734 but he moved as child to London when his father, William Pickford, died in 1742. Pickford's initial training was undertaken under the stonemason and sculptor Joseph Pickford (his uncle), at his Hyde Park, London premises. Pickford worked with his uncle for about ten years, training first as a mason and then as an architect. Pickford at one time had offices in both London and Derby. The architect moved to Derby in circa 1760, where he was the agent of Foremarke Hall architect David Hiorne of Warwick. He was married to Mary, daughter of Thomas Wilkins who was the principal agent of Wenman Coke of Longford Hall, Derbyshire which Pickford altered around 1762. The house he designed for himself, Number 41 Friar Gate, is now the Pickford's House Museum and also a Grade I listed building. Pickford worked extensively throughout the Midland counties of England, primarily designing town and country houses in the Palladian style. A significant number of his friends and clients were members of the influential Lunar Society, including the potter Josiah Wedgwood, the painter Joseph Wright of Derby, and the inventors Matthew Boulton and John Whitehurst.

Joseph Pickford worked with many important people of the time such as William Cavendish, the 5th Duke of Devonshire, William Fitzherbert of Tissington Hall and Lord Archibald Hamilton, as well as minor people of the era, such as Robert Holden and Hugh Wood.

Joseph Pickford would die an untimely death in 1782 while at his home in Friar Gate, Derby. He would be buried at St.Werburghs Church, with his wife, Mary, being buried alongside him when she died in April 1812.

In early 2013 Derby City Council and Derby Civic Society announced they would erect a blue plaque as a memorial on Pickford's House in Derby.

== Principal works ==
- St Helen's House, King Street, Derby, Derbyshire (1766–67) for John Gisbourne.
- Hams Hall, Coleshill, Warwickshire for CB Adderely (1768, now demolished).
- Etruria Hall, Stoke-on-Trent, Staffordshire for Josiah Wedgwood (1768–70, now comprises part of a hotel).
- St Mary's Church, Whittall Street, Birmingham (1773-4, demolished 1926).
- Sandon Hall, Staffordshire (1769-71; destroyed by a fire in 1848 and replaced with present building).
- Pickford’s House, Friar Gate, Derby (1769-70), Pickford’s own family home in which he lived until his death in 1782.
- Markeaton Park Orangery and Stables, Derby (1775-6) for the Mundy Family of the now demolished Markeaton Hall.
- Long Eaton Town Hall, Long Eaton (1778), for John Howitt, a local gentry farmer.
- Edensor Inn (now Chatsworth Estate Office), Edensor, Derbyshire (1776-77) for the 5th Duke of Devonshire.
- Swanwick Hall, Swanwick, Derbyshire (1771-72) for Hugh Wood; extended and altered significantly since.

== Gallery of architectural work ==
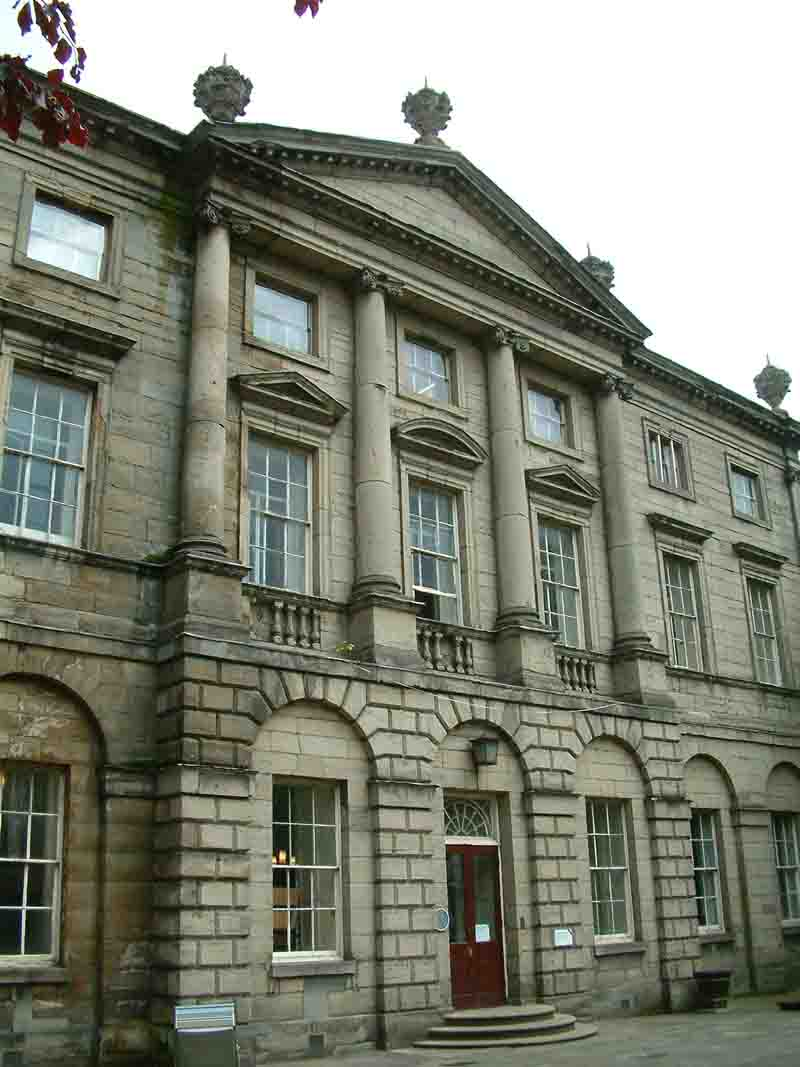
St. Helen’s House, Derby

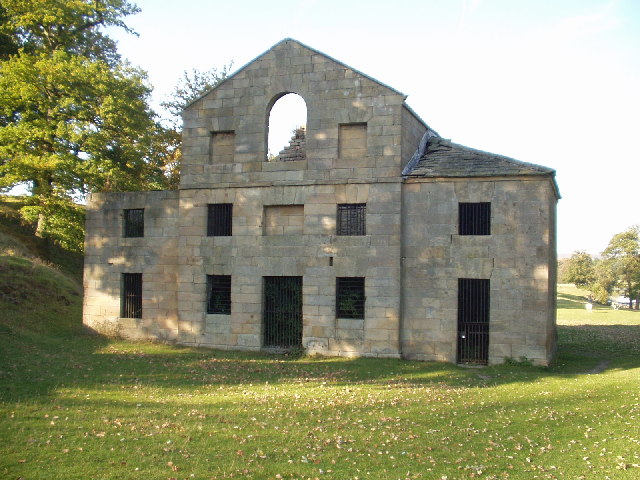
Mill, Chatsworth, Derbyshire

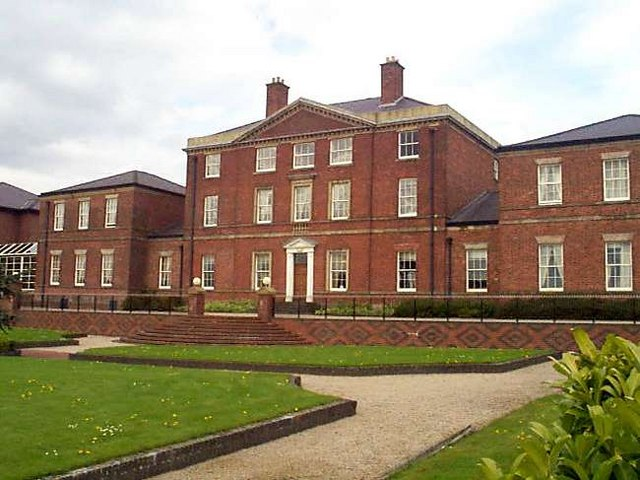
Etruria Hall, Stoke-on-Trent, Staffordshire

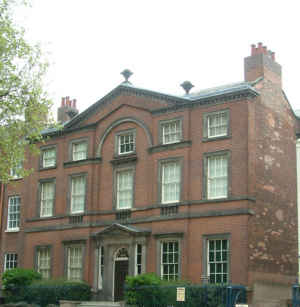
Pickford's House, Derby

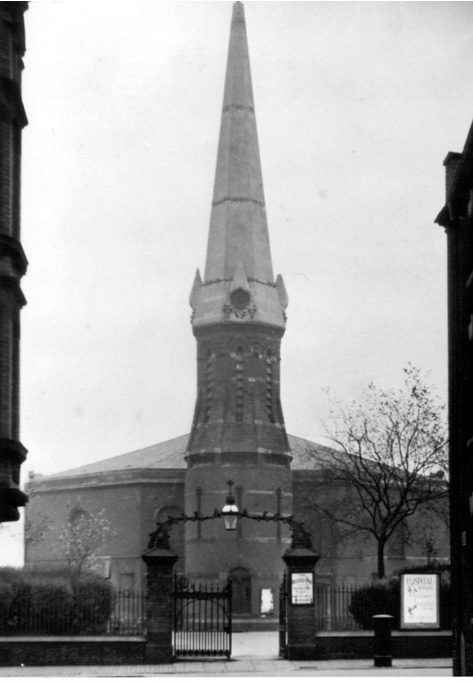
St Mary's Church, Whittall Street, Birmingham

== Sources ==
The principal published source for information on Pickford is Edward Saunders, Joseph Pickford of Derby A Georgian Architect (Alan Sutton, 1993)
