= Hans Voss =

German naval officer

Rear-Admiral Hans Voss (28 April 1894 – 29 May 1973) was a German naval officer. He entered the German Imperial Navy on 6 August 1914.

== World War I ==
By January 1918 he was serving on the Turkish cruiser Midilli, ex-SMS Breslau, when it sortied into the Aegean Sea to attack British troop transports. Shortly after taking part in the sinking of the British monitors HMS Raglan and HMS M28 the Midilli struck five mines and sank with the loss of 331 Turkish and German members of her crew. The surviving 162 crewmembers, including trainee naval engineer Hans Voss, were rescued by a British destroyer and became prisoners of war. Voss was able to return to Germany in September 1919. Voss remained as a naval engineer, based on Germany's Baltic coast.

== World War II ==
From October 1938 to July 1943 Voss was a consultant in the Operations Department of the Seekriegsleitung (Sea Combat Command or Naval General Staff). From August 1943 to October 1944 Voss was Chief of the Higher Shipyard Staff Ostland (the German name for the Baltic states of Latvia, Lithuania, Estonia and portions of Northern Russia). From October 1944 to March 1945 he was Higher Commander of the Warship Construction Training Department and from April–May 1945 he was Chief of the Higher Shipyard Staff, Navy High Command, Norway. It was in Oslo, Norway that he was captured by the British in May 1945 and became a prisoner of war.

== Post-WWII ==
Voss subsequently spent time in the British prisoner of war camp at Island Farm, Wales, and also Grizedale Hall, in the Lake District. In February 1948 he was transferred to London Cage for Germany, in US custody, to be a witness, and was then released. (From Island Farm website).

Voss married twice, and had three children with his first wife, and two stepchildren from his second marriage.

After the war, Voss lived in the market town of Eutin, Schleswig-Holstein. He was a lifelong Anglophile who enjoyed reading Shakespeare and spoke good English. He enjoyed the company of his second wife, Irmgard, and the visits of his 13 grandchildren, until his death in 1973.
