= Listed buildings in Swanwick, Derbyshire =

Swanwick is a civil parish in the Amber Valley district of Derbyshire, England. The parish contains nine listed buildings that are recorded in the National Heritage List for England. All the listed buildings are designated at Grade II, the lowest of the three grades, which is applied to "buildings of national importance and special interest". The parish contains the village of Swanwick and the surrounding area. The listed buildings consist of houses, farmhouses and farm buildings, a house expanded into a school and its coach house, a church, and disused colliery buildings.

== Buildings ==
Name and location	Photograph	Date	Notes
Barn south of Turners Charity Farmhouse; 53.07241°N 1.38318°W		18th century	The barn, which has been altered, is in stone with quoins and a tile roof. It contains inserted windows and doorways with segmental heads, a roof dormer on the south side, and in the west gable end are original vents.
110, 112 and 114 Derby Road; 53.07410°N 1.39953°W	—	Early 17th century	A house, later divided into three, in sandstone with gritstone dressings and a tile roof. There are two storeys and attics, and each part has two bays. No. 110 on the right has a chamfered plinth and quoins, casement and mullioned windows, some with hood moulds, a dated plaque, and a dormer with a coped gable and moulded kneelers. No. 112 has a variety of windows, some with wedge lintels, and No. 114 has a lean-to with a pantile roof and mullioned windows.
Oakstone Cottage; 53.07520°N 1.39650°W	—	Mid 18th century	The house is in stone, and has a tile roof with stone coped gables and moulded kneelers. There are two storeys and three bays. The doorway has a large lintel, and the windows are mullioned.
Swanwick Hall School; 53.07327°N 1.39693°W		1771–72	Originally a house that was extended in the later 19th century, further extended and converted into a school by George H. Widdows in the 1930s, and additions made in 1959. The school is in red brick with dressings in stone and brick, and roofs in slate and tile. The original house has three storeys and fronts of three bays, recessed to the right is a three-bay wing, and to the left is a two-bay wing, and at the rear of the wings are classroom ranges forming a courtyard. The original house has a stone plinth, steps leading up to a central Tuscan doorway with a pulvinated frieze and a pediment, and sash windows. Above is a dentilled cornice and a hipped roof with a central square lantern. The right wing contains two oriel windows, an oval window with a moulded surround and a keystone, and a shell-headed niche. In the left wing is a canted bay window with a balustraded parapet. The classroom wings have semicircular arches and open arcaded corridors.
Coach house, Swanwick Hall; 53.07336°N 1.39606°W	—	Early 19th century	The coach house and stables are in stone with quoins, and a hipped slate roof with a central ogee-domed cupola. There are two storeys and three bays. The building contains a central segmental-headed arch, a doorway with a quoined surround, blocked windows in the ground floor, and sash windows in the upper floor.
Turners Charity Farmhouse; 53.07255°N 1.38330°W		Early 19th century	The farmhouse, with possibly an earlier core, is in sandstone, with quoins and a tile roof. There are two storeys and an L-shaped plan, consisting of a front range of three bays, and a single-storey rear wing. The central doorway has a chamfered quoined surround, and the windows are sashes, some of which are blocked. In the rear wing are gabled dormers and 20th-century windows.
Tag Farmhouse; 53.07980°N 1.39930°W	—	Early 19th century	The farmhouse is in sandstone with quoins, a coved eaves band, and a tile roof. There are two storeys and two bays. The windows are horizontally-sliding sashes, and all the openings have flat stone arches.
St Andrew's Church; 53.07467°N 1.39801°W		1858–60	The tower was added to the church in 1902–03. The church is built in sandstone with slate roofs, and consists of a nave, north and south aisles, a chancel with a vestry, and a north tower attached to the northwest porch. The tower has three stages, angle buttresses, a moulded plinth, and chamfered string courses. On the north side is a pointed doorway with a moulded surround, and a hood mould with a foliage ogee finial, flanked by pairs of shields. On the west side is a circular stair turret, and there are clock faces on the west and north sides. The top stage has three-light bell openings, with hood moulds, corner gargoyles, and central angel corbels carrying triangular pilasters with pinnacles. At the top are embattled parapets with crocketed corner finials.
Colliery Headstock and Winding House; 53.08492°N 1.39716°W	—	Early 20th century	The winding house of the disused colliery is in brick with a slate roof and a rectangular plan. Steps lead up to the doorway, and there is a higher opening. On each side is a recessed panel with a blue brick plinth. The headstock is in steel, and has two rectangular beams braced with diagonal steel struts.
