= Franz von Werra =

German fighter pilot (1914–1941)

Franz Freiherr von Werra
- Franz Freiherr von Werra
- Born: 13 July 1914; Leuk, Canton of Valais, Switzerland
- Died: 25 October 1941 (aged 27); North Sea, off Vlissingen, German-occupied Netherlands
- Military career
- Allegiance: Germany
- Branch: Luftwaffe
- Service years: 1936–1941
- Rank: Hauptmann (captain)
- Units: JG 3, JG 53
- Commands: I./JG 53
- Conflicts: World War II: Battle of France; Battle of Britain; Operation Barbarossa
- Awards: Iron Cross, Second Class; Iron Cross, First Class; Knight's Cross of the Iron Cross

Franz Xaver Freiherr von Werra (13 July 1914 – 25 October 1941) was a German World War II fighter pilot and flying ace who was shot down over Britain and captured. He was the only Axis prisoner of war to escape from Canadian custody and return to Germany apart from a U-boat seaman, Walter Kurt Reich, said to have jumped from a Polish troopship into the St. Lawrence River in July 1940. Werra managed to return to Germany via the US, Mexico, South America and Spain, finally reaching Germany on 18 April 1941.

Oberleutnant von Werra was awarded the Knight's Cross of the Iron Cross on 14 December 1940. His story was told in the book The One That Got Away by Kendall Burt and James Leasor, which was made into a film of the same name, starring Hardy Krüger.

== Biography ==
Franz Freiherr von Werra was born on 13 July 1914, to impoverished Swiss parents in Leuk, a town in the Swiss canton of Valais. The title of Freiherr (equal to Baron) came from his biological father, Leo Freiherr von Werra, who after bankruptcy, faced deep economic hardship. Because his relatives were legally obliged to look after the Baron's wife and six children, his cousin Rosalie von Werra persuaded her childless friend Louise Carl von Haber to permit the Baron's youngest, Franz and his sister, to enjoy the benefits of wealth and education. The von Habers did not tell the children their true origin.

Werra joined the Luftwaffe in 1936 and was commissioned a Leutnant in 1938. At the beginning of the Second World War he was serving with Jagdgeschwader 3 in the Battle of France. He became adjutant of II Gruppe, JG 3 and was described as engaging in boisterous 'playboy' behaviour. He was once pictured in the press with his pet lion Simba, which he kept at the aerodrome as the unit mascot. Werra scored his first four victories in May 1940, during the Battle of France. Downing a Hawker Hurricane on 20 May, two days later he claimed two Breguet 690 bombers and a Potez 630 near Cambrai. In a sortie on 25 August during the Battle of Britain, he claimed a Spitfire west of Rochester, and three Hurricanes, as well as five destroyed on the ground for a total of nine RAF planes eliminated. The details of the actions are unknown, as the incident has not been found in British records.

=== Capture and escapes ===
On 5 September 1940, Werra's Bf 109E-4 (W.Nr. 1480) was shot down over Winchet Hill, Kent. It is unclear who was responsible for this victory, which was originally credited to Pilot Officer Gerald "Stapme" Stapleton of 603 Squadron. The Australian ace Flight Lieutenant Paterson Hughes (234 Squadron) was posthumously given half of the credit, in The London Gazette 22 October 1940 citation awarding him a bar to his DFC. Some sources suggest that P/O George Bennions of 41 Squadron may have damaged Werra's fighter before Hughes and Stapleton also scored hits on it. Other sources suggest F/L John Terence Webster of 41 Squadron was the victor.

Werra crash-landed in a field on Loves Farm and was captured by the unarmed cook of a nearby army unit. He was initially held in Maidstone barracks by the Queen's Own Royal West Kent Regiment, from which he attempted his first escape. He was digging with a pick axe while guarded by Military Police Private Denis Rickwood, who was armed only with a small truncheon. There is no mention of this escape attempt in the book The One that Got Away. He was interrogated for 18 days at the London District Prisoner of War "cage" Trent Park, a country house in Hertfordshire which before the war had been the seat of Sir Philip Sassoon. Eventually, Werra was sent to POW Camp No. 1, at Grizedale Hall in the Furness Fells area of Lancashire, between Windermere and Coniston Water.

Franz von Werra's Bf 109E-4, pictured at Marden, Kent

On 7 October he tried to escape for a second time, during a daytime walk outside the camp. At a regular stop, while a fruit cart provided a lucky diversion and other German prisoners covered for him, Werra slipped over a dry-stone wall into a field. The guards alerted the local farmers and the Home Guard. On the evening of 10 October at around 11:00 p.m., two Home Guards found him sheltering from the rain in a hoggarth (a type of small stone hut used for storing sheep fodder that is common in the area). On being removed from the hut he knocked the lamp to the ground, extinguishing the light, then he quickly escaped and disappeared into the night. On 12 October, he was spotted climbing a fell. The area was surrounded, and Werra was eventually found, almost immersed in a muddy depression in the ground. He was sentenced to 21 days of solitary confinement and on 3 November was transferred to Camp No. 13 in Swanwick, Derbyshire, also known as the Hayes camp.

In Camp No. 13, Werra joined a group calling itself Swanwick Tiefbau A.G. (Swanwick Excavations, Ltd.), which was digging an escape tunnel. The tunnel can still be seen at the Hayes Conference Centre. On 17 December 1940, after a month's digging, it was complete. The camp had forgers who equipped the escape group with money and fake identity papers. On 20 December, Werra and four others slipped out of the tunnel under the cover of anti-aircraft fire and the singing of the camp choir. The others were recaptured quickly, leaving Werra to proceed alone. He had taken along his flying suit and decided to masquerade as Captain van Lott, a Dutch Royal Netherlands Air Force pilot. He told a friendly locomotive driver that he was a downed bomber pilot trying to reach his unit, and asked to be taken to the nearest RAF base. At Codnor Park railway station, a local staff member became suspicious but eventually agreed to arrange his transport to the aerodrome at RAF Hucknall, near Nottingham. The police also questioned him but von Werra convinced them he was genuine. At Hucknall, a Squadron Leader Boniface asked for his credentials and von Werra claimed to be based at Dyce near Aberdeen. While Boniface went to check this story, von Werra excused himself and ran to the nearest hangar, trying to tell a mechanic that he was cleared for a test flight. Boniface arrived in time to arrest him at gunpoint, as he sat in the cockpit, trying to familiarise himself with the controls. Von Werra was sent back to the Hayes camp under armed guard.

In January 1941, von Werra was sent with many other German prisoners to Canada on the SS Duchess of York, in a convoy departing Greenock on 10 January 1941, guarded by HMS Ramillies among others. His group was to be taken to a camp on the north shore of Lake Superior, Ontario, so Werra began to plan his escape to the United States, then neutral. On 21 January, while on a prison train that had departed Montreal, he jumped out of a window, again with the help of other prisoners and ended up near Smiths Falls, Ontario, 30 miles from the St. Lawrence River. Seven other prisoners tried to escape from the same train but were soon recaptured. Werra's absence was not noticed until the next afternoon.

After crossing the frozen St. Lawrence River, von Werra made his way to Ogdensburg, New York, arriving several months before the US entered the war and turned himself over to the police. The immigration authorities charged him with entering the country illegally and Werra contacted the local German consul, who paid his bail. He came to the attention of the press and told them a very embellished version of his story. While the U.S. and Canadian authorities were negotiating his extradition, the German vice-consul helped him over the border to Mexico. Werra proceeded in stages to Rio de Janeiro, (Brazil), Barcelona, (Spain) and Rome, (Italy). He finally reached Nazi Germany on 18 April 1941.

=== Return and death ===
On his return to Nazi Germany, von Werra became a hero. Adolf Hitler awarded him the Knight's Cross of the Iron Cross (Ritterkreuz des Eisernen Kreuzes). Werra was assigned the task of improving German techniques for interrogating captured pilots, based on his experiences with the British system. Werra reported to the German High Command on how he had been treated as a POW, and this caused an improvement in the treatment of Allied POWs in Germany. He wrote a book about his experiences titled Meine Flucht aus England (My Escape from England), although it remained unpublished.

On 22 June 1941, German forces launched Operation Barbarossa, the invasion of the Soviet Union. Two days later, Oberleutnant Wilfried Balfanz, the commander of I. Gruppe of Jagdgeschwader 53 (JG 53—53rd Fighter Wing), was killed in action. Consequently, Oberleutnant Ignaz Prestele briefly commanded the Gruppe until von Werra was appointed the Gruppenkommandeur (group commander) on 1 July. At the time, I. Gruppe was based at Hostynne.

In early August 1941, I. Gruppe withdrew to Germany to re-equip with the new Bf 109 F-4 at Mannheim-Sandhofen Airfield. On 20 September, the Gruppe relocated to the Netherlands where they were based at airfields at Katwijk, specifically Fliegerhorst Katwijk, and Haamstede where they were tasked with patrolling the Dutch airspace. On 25 October 1941, Werra took off in Bf 109 F-4/Z, Werknummer (factory number) 7285, on a practice flight. His aircraft suffered engine failure and crashed into the sea near Katwijk. von Werra was presumed killed, though his body was never found. Hauptmann Herbert Kaminski succeeded him as commander of I. Gruppe.

== Film ==
Von Werra's story was the subject of the 1957 film The One That Got Away starring Hardy Krüger as Franz von Werra. The film was based on a book by Kendall Burt and James Leasor published in 1956. A documentary called von Werra (with clips from The One That Got Away) was released in the 2000s.

== Summary of career ==
=== Aerial victory claims ===
According to Obermaier, von Werra was credited with 21 aerial victories, eight of which over the Western Allies and thirteen on the Eastern Front, plus five further aircraft destroyed in ground attack missions. Mathews and Foreman, authors of Luftwaffe Aces — Biographies and Victory Claims, researched the German Federal Archives and found records for fourteen aerial victory claims, plus five further unconfirmed claims. This figure of confirmed claims includes eleven aerial victories on the Eastern Front and three on the Western Front.

Chronicle of aerial victories
This and the ? (question mark) indicates information discrepancies listed by Prien, Stemmer, Rodeike, Bock, Mathews and Foreman.
– Stab II. Gruppe of Jagdgeschwader 3 – Battle of France — 19 May – 25 June 1940
1	22 May 1940	16:28	Hurricane	15 km (9.3 mi) east of Arras	3? (Note: According to Mathews and Foreman, this claim is unconfirmed.)	22 May 1940	12:52	Bréguet 690	Cambrai
2?	22 May 1940	12:36	Bréguet 690	Saudemont	4?	22 May 1940	14:26	Potez 63	southwest of Cambrai
– Stab II. Gruppe of Jagdgeschwader 3 – Action at the Channel and over England — 26 June – 5 September 1940
5	28 August 1940	17:10	Spitfire	3 km (1.9 mi) east of Rochester	7?	28 August 1940	—	Hurricane	
6?	28 August 1940	—	Hurricane		8?	28 August 1940	—	Hurricane	
– Stab I. Gruppe of Jagdgeschwader 53 – Operation Barbarossa — 1 July – 7 August 1941
9	7 July 1941	09:05	DB-3	south of Ploskirov; Kraskoje	15	18 July 1941	12:03? (Note: According to Mathews and Foreman claimed at 12:05.)	SB-3	
10	7 July 1941	17:10	DB-3		16	26 July 1941	10:53	SB-3	
11	11 July 1941	18:40	SB-3	Kudno	17	29 July 1941	17:05	SB-3	south of Smola
12	11 July 1941	18:42	SB-3	Kudno	18	31 July 1941	15:05	Pe-2	
13	12 July 1941	10:32	DB-3? (Note: According to Mathews and Foreman claimed as a Tupolev SB-3.)		19	31 July 1941	15:08	V-11 (Il-2)	
14	17 July 1941	17:50	I-153						

=== Awards ===
- Iron Cross (1939) 2nd and 1st Class
- Knight's Cross of the Iron Cross on 14 December 1940 as Oberleutnant and adjutant of the II./Jagdgeschwader 3
