= A Cage of Eagles =

1989 novel by James Follet

- Author: James Follet
- Language: English
- Genre: Thriller
- Publisher: Routledge
- Publication date: 1989
- Publication place: United States
- Media type: Print (Paperback)
- ISBN: 978-0-413-19200-4
- OCLC: 18949381

A Cage of Eagles is a 1989 thriller novel by James Follet, taking place at 1941 in the POW Camp at Grizedale Hall at England's Lake District, where some of the most capable of the German officers captured by Britain were kept (and constantly plotted escape).

== Plot introduction ==
The book centers on the battle of wits and the ambiguous relationship developing between U-boat ace Otto Kruger, leader of the captured Germans, and Ian Fleming in his real-life World War II role as an intelligence officer which would later inspire the James Bond books. It ends in December 1941, with an open-ended conclusion clearly leaving the possibility of a sequel. However, for many years afterwards Follet wrote on other subjects, only in 2004 coming up with the long-delayed sequel A Forest of Eagles - followed immediately by a final volume of what became a trilogy, Return of the Eagles.
