= The One That Got Away (1957 film) =

1957 British film by Roy Ward Baker

- theatrical poster
- Directed by: Roy Ward Baker
- Written by: Howard Clewes
- Based on: the book The One That Got Away by Kendal Burt and James Leasor
- Produced by: Julian Wintle; Earl St. John
- Starring: Hardy Krüger
- Cinematography: Eric Cross
- Edited by: Sidney Hayers
- Music by: Hubert Clifford
- Production company: Julian Wintle Productions
- Distributed by: Rank Organisation
- Release date: 22 November 1957
- Running time: 111 minutes
- Country: United Kingdom
- Language: English
- Box office: £3 million (Germany)

The One That Got Away is a 1957 British biographical war film starring Hardy Krüger and featuring Michael Goodliffe, Jack Gwillim and Alec McCowen. The film was directed by Roy Ward Baker with a screenplay written by Howard Clewes, based on the 1956 book of the same name by Kendal Burt and James Leasor.

The film chronicles the true exploits of Oberleutnant Franz von Werra, a Luftwaffe pilot shot down over Britain in 1940. He initially tried to escape while captive in England, but was later successful during transfer to a Canadian POW camp. Von Werra was the only Axis POW to succeed in escaping and make it home during the war.

== Plot ==
Luftwaffe fighter pilot Franz von Werra is shot down during the Battle of Britain and captured. At the 'London Cage', the military intelligence POW reception centre, he wagers with his RAF interrogator that he will escape within six months. At Trent Park House outside London, von Werra is placed with other officers and their conversations are bugged, but a wary von Werra is too cautious to give much away, mocking the surveillance listeners by decrying the obvious methods.

Initially, von Werra is sent to No 1 prisoner-of-war camp Grizedale Hall in the Furness area of Lancashire (now Cumbria). During a group walk rest stop, he times a distraction to drop over a wall on which he is lying and escapes into the hills. It takes an intense manhunt by troops and police to recapture him.

Subsequently, von Werra is sent to a more secure POW camp (based on the Hayes Conference Centre) near Swanwick, Derbyshire. During a German air raid, he and four others escape through a tunnel. The others pair up, but von Werra goes it alone. Reaching Codnor Park railway station, he impersonates a Dutch pilot and claims his Wellington bomber had crashed while on a secret mission. The station master telephones the police to take him to the nearest airfield, RAF Hucknall. Von Werra tricks the RAF duty officer into sending a car. The police arrive first, but with much bravado he delays them until the RAF car arrives. He gets to the airfield and spots a Hawker Hurricane. When his story starts to fray, von Werra creeps away and tries to steal an experimental Hawker Hurricane, getting as far as sitting in it and starting the engine before being caught.

Along with many other POWs, von Werra is then sent by ship to Canada, arriving at Halifax, Nova Scotia. On the train ride across the country, while the guards are distracted, he escapes by jumping from a window near Smiths Falls, Ontario. Making his way south hitching rides, von Werra finds the St. Lawrence River not as frozen solid as he has been led to believe. Stealing a rowboat, he pushes it over the ice until he reaches the free-flowing section. Von Werra reaches the still-neutral United States almost frozen to death.

Back in the United Kingdom the RAF interrogator receives a postcard from von Werra, featuring a photograph of the Statue of Liberty, informing him that he has lost his bet.

The film's epilogue states: Despite the efforts of the Canadian Government to obtain his return, and of the United States authorities to hold him, Von Werra crossed the border into Mexico. Travelling by way of Peru, Bolivia, Brazil and Spain, he reached Berlin on 18 April 1941. On October 25th of the same year, while on patrol, his plane was seen to dive into the sea. No trace of Von Werra was found.

== Cast ==
- Hardy Krüger as Franz von Werra
- Michael Goodliffe as RAF interrogator
- Colin Gordon as army interrogator
- Alec McCowen as duty officer, Hucknall
- Terence Alexander as RAF intelligence officer
- Jack Gwillim as commandant, Grizedale
- Andrew Faulds as lieutenant, Grizedale
- Julian Somers as railway station booking clerk
- Harry Lockart as German prisoner
- Robert Crewdson as German prisoner
- George Mikell as German prisoner
- George Roubicek as German prisoner
- John Van Eyssen as German prisoner
- Frederick Jaeger as German prisoner
- Richard Marner as German prisoner
- Paul Hansard as German prisoner
- Edward Cast as duty driver, Hucknall (uncredited)
- Cyril Chamberlain as Sergeant 'Later' (uncredited)
- Reed De Rouen as Canadian truck driver (uncredited)
- Michael Golden as first detective (uncredited)
- Glyn Houston as Harry, the aircraft fitter working on the Hurricane fighter (uncredited)
- Stratford Johns as second detective (uncredited)
- Charles Morgan as workshop manager, Hucknall (uncredited)
- Al Mulock as American patrolman at Ogdensburg (uncredited)
- Michael Ripper as corporal of group with cook (uncredited)
- Anthony Sagar as cook who captures von Werra in Kent (uncredited)
- Norman Rossington as sergeant, Swanwick (uncredited)
- Ben Williams as policeman, Hucknall (uncredited)
- Frank Williams as station porter (uncredited)

== Production ==
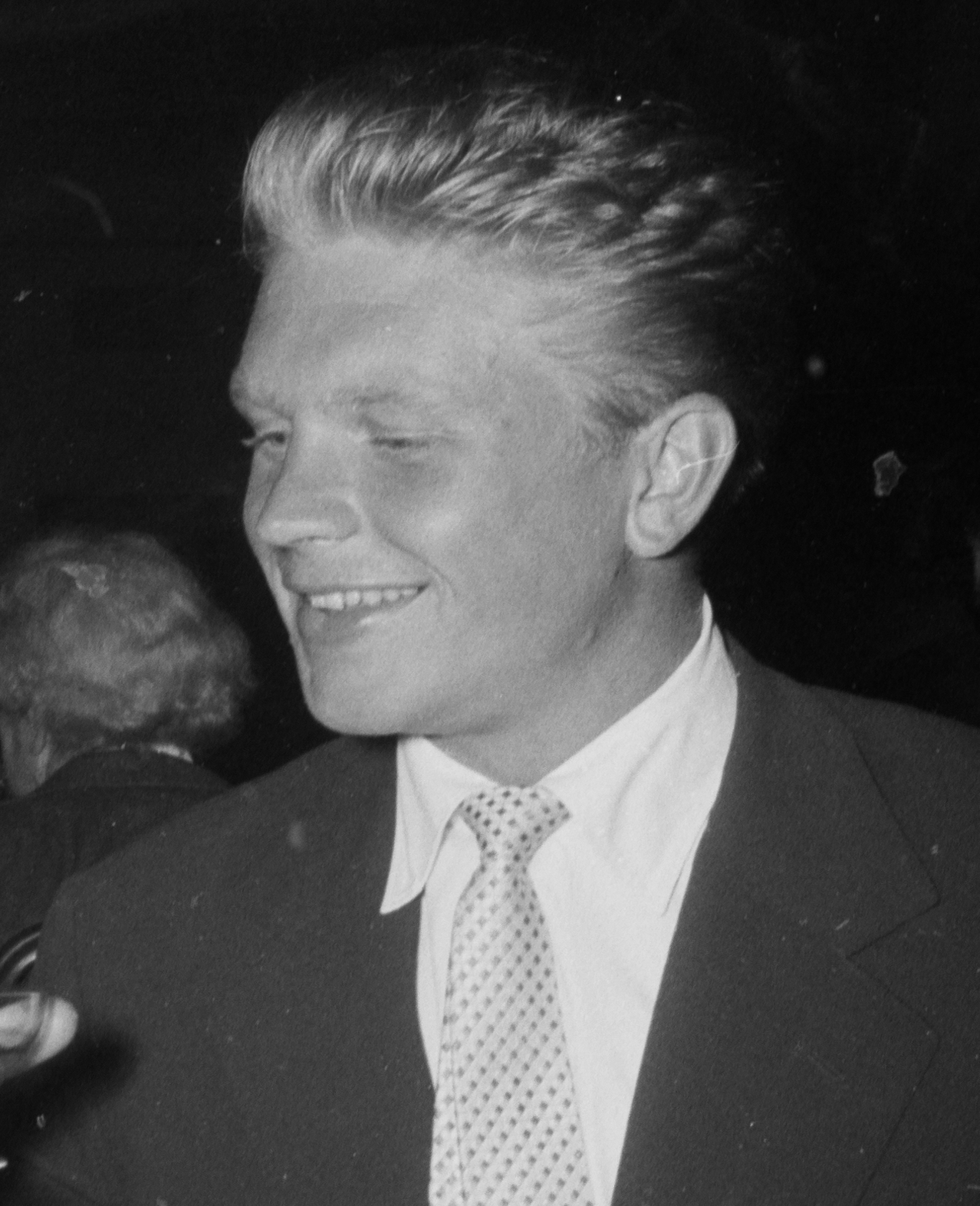
Hardy Krüger plays Franz von Werra

Kenneth More says he was approached to play the lead role but turned it down as he had just played another real-life POW in Reach for the Sky (1956). John Davis, head of the Rank Organisation, wanted Dirk Bogarde. Director Roy Ward Baker insisted on a German. Rank's overseas distribution manager then suggested Hardy Krüger.

A Messerschmitt Bf 109 and Hawker Hurricane were featured in the film. As of 2022, the Hawker Hurricane IIc (serial number LF363) is still in existence, flying with the Battle of Britain Memorial Flight.

== Reception ==
=== Critical ===
The film was generally well received by audiences and critics. Howard H. Thompson of The New York Times noted its "... restrained, well-knit scenario."

In British Sound Films David Quinlan writes: "Interesting war story with nail-biting climax."

Leslie Halliwell opined: "True-life biopic, developed in a number of suspense and action sequences, all very well done."

=== Box office ===
According to Kinematograph Weekly the film was "in the money" at the British box office in 1957. The film did extremely well in West Germany, making over £3 million, with a comfortable profit. This prompted producer Julian Wintle to form his own production company and he made two films with German protagonists, Bachelor of Hearts (1958, also starring Krüger) and Tiger Bay (1959).
