= The Destruction Factor =

1978 BBC radio play

The Destruction Factor is a 1978 BBC radio play written by James Follett and starring T. P. McKenna, Paul Copley and Rosalind Adams. It was broadcast over six episodes on BBC Radio 4 Extra.

It is a sci-fi thriller about the development of a new plant species created in a laboratory to help eliminate Third World famine.

== Episode list ==
1. The Seeds of Creation – Can a corporation's new plant strain mutation bring relief to famine stricken countries?
2. The Devil's Harvest – As fires erupt – why is Ralph Exon's new plant strain mutation growing so rapidly?
3. The Wings Of Azreal – "If there are plants in hell, they'll probably be like the plants that my poor father created."
4. Birdstrike – After sparking a plane crash, the deadly Exon plant strain's advancement continues.
5. Search and Destroy – Despite the national emergency, landowners try to profit from the deadly Exon strain.
6. World Without Fire – Before the US start their 'defoliation' program, the British government must track all the Exxon seeds.

== Plot ==
Agriculturist Ralph Exon has created a new strain of Soya Bean plant, (dubbed "The Exon Strain") in an effort to alleviate famine in the Third world. The plant is remarkably hardy and efficient – growing over two feet in the space of half an hour under almost any conditions. However, it has an unexpected side effect and produces oxygen at vastly increased levels, so much so that when placed in proximity to a naked flame it causes uncontrollable fires that are at first mistaken for incendiary devices by the police and fire brigade.

The Exon strain has been created in laboratory conditions but due to emergency venting of the biodome, the plants have escaped and birds have propagated them around the country. Birds are uncontrollably drawn to the seeds, and one of the scientists investigating the plant notes that even birds not normally known for being seed-eaters are attracted. Ralph, despondent over his creation commits suicide leaving his daughter distraught, but determined to discover why he would do so.

From measuring the oxygen buildup in the biodome the scientific task force (Exon's daughter Denise, her fiancé Howard Rogers, Nobel prize winning microbiologist Max Flinders, and a government-backed scientist named only as "Blowers",) discover that the oxygen output is so high that if unchecked within twenty years the oxygen balance of the planet will have been doubled to 40%, making current life all but extinct. Another emergency vent of the biodome is required, but a 747 Jumbo jet passes through the escaping oxygen bubble causing it to explode as the engines suck in pure oxygen.

The UN becomes involved and gives the United Kingdom an ultimatum – destroy all the Exon Strain or the UN will carpet-bomb the entire country with defoliants, on a scale far greater than was attempted in Vietnam, completely stripping the country of any greenery at all.

The government instigates emergency measures offering a reward for every plant handed to the police, and a minimum fine of £10,000 for deliberate cultivation. The reward prompts literally millions of plants to be handed in, but Flinders is convinced it will not be enough, none of them having realised how proliferous the plant was. Howard develops a spectroscopic measuring device that can detect the plant from the air and helicopters are fitted with the device, overflying the country eliminating it where found.

In Wales the helicopter carrying Howard crashes, and he is found near a group of plants over 8 feet tall – far taller than any others and with correspondingly higher oxygen output. Analysis shows that these "giant" plants are in fact the norm, and all other plants are stunted – the Exon strain requires a high copper content in the soil to grow, which is naturally scarce in English soil.

Flinders persuades the government to commandeer a European satellite that has similar sensors to that of his spectroscope, and has its orbit reduced low enough to scan the country – but also so low that it will burn up in the high atmosphere, possibly before a full scan is complete, and also dropping its miniature nuclear reactor back onto the planet. The government decides that nuclear contamination is a lesser evil to the carpet bombing and authorises its use.

The satellite is destroyed before the last scan is completed, but a composite map of the remaining Exon strain plants is obtained. The UN ambassador queries its accuracy, and is invited to give the coordinates of the first plant to a helicopter team herself. The plant is so close to the helicopter that the pilot can walk to it, and finds and destroys it. He says that it was less than three inches tall, and hidden under a large bracken fern – suggesting that the sensor array was indeed accurate. To compensate for the missing scan Howard's helicopter array is used, and the UN ambassador is satisfied that all Exon Strain plants can be destroyed, so calls off the carpet bombing.

Flinders, collating his notes realises that the Exon strain has been leaching chemicals out of the ground, and where it has been destroyed has left a rich natural fertiliser, meaning future harvests will be greater. Blowers and Flinders discuss a nagging doubt that both share – the scan may not have been accurate enough after all, but that they will have to wait until after winter to see if any plants really have survived.

== Herbicide Vs Defoliant ==
The radio play states that the country will be bombed with defoliants – drawing an analogy with Operation Ranch Hand in Vietnam, however they actually plan to use herbicides instead, which kill plants rather than stripping leaves. The Exon strain is shown to be hardy enough to survive having its leaves removed – regrowing them within minutes in one case.

== Cast ==
- T. P. McKenna – Max Flinders
- Paul Copley – Howard Rogers
- Rosalind Adams – Denise Exon
