= Hayes Conference Centre =

Christian conference centre in Derbyshire, England

Coordinates: 53.0696°N 1.3887°W

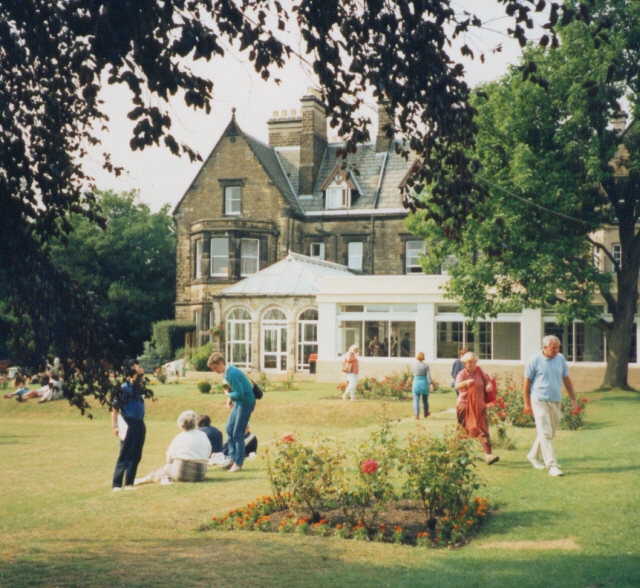
The main building viewed from over the main lawn

The Hayes Conference Centre is a group of buildings in Swanwick, Derbyshire, United Kingdom, which are used for conferences and other functions.

== History ==
In the 1860s, Derbyshire entrepreneur Francis Wright built the building which now houses the centre's reception as a wedding gift for his wife, Louise Charlotte Rudolphine von Beckmann, and his son Fitzherbert. The residence was named Swanwick Hayes. The conservatory was built by Fitzherbert Wright, who owned the Butterly Ironworks Company at the time; the Butterly Company also built St Pancras railway station, which the conservatory building resembles. In 1910, First Conference Estate Ltd., now known as Christian Conference Trust, bought the building for £11,500, roughly one-fifth of what it cost to build. The building was expanded and renovated at a cost of £10,240 and turned into a Christian conference centre. The first conference on the new site took place in 1912.

During the Second World War years, the building was used as a POW camp for German and Italian prisoners. The site, now named Hayes Camp, was the second camp to fail to hold the famous German escapee Franz von Werra, "The One That Got Away". von Werra's escape tunnel can still be seen at the conference centre. Manchester City F.C. goalkeeper Bert Trautmann and theologian Jürgen Moltmann were also held as POWs at the Hayes.

== Amenities ==
The centre, which has had many additions since it opened, provides sleeping accommodation for up to 400 people in 274 rooms (11 of which are for disabled persons). Most rooms are en-suite though an ever decreasing number have shared washing and toilet facilities. There are two main dining rooms, and full-time catering staff work alongside cleaners and other workers. There are 30 rooms designed to hold meetings. The largest two hold 420 and 400, and the other two large ones hold 150 and 140. Other facilities include a bar, five a side football pitches, a games room and a chapel with room for 350. There are internet access points in many of the rooms.

Most of the clients using this 90-acre (360,000 m^{2}) estate are Christian groups, as the centre has been run by the Christian Conference Trust since 1910. In addition, the centre is frequently visited by the Swanwick writers' summer school.
