= Rogemar Mamon =

Canadian mathematician

Rogemar Sombong Mamon is a Canadian mathematician, quant, and academic. He is a co-editor of the IMA Journal of Management Mathematics published by Oxford University Press since 2009.

Mamon is known for his contributions to the developments and applications of regime-switching framework useful in economic, financial and actuarial modeling. Majority of his works promote regime-switching paradigms modulated by either discrete- or continuous-time hidden Markov models (HMM). A recurrent theme of his research is dynamic parameter estimation via HMM filtering recursions. He also made contributions in the areas of derivative pricing, asset allocation, risk measurement, filtering to remove noise from data as well as inverse problems in quantitative finance. He was the lead editor of the handbook Hidden Markov Models in Finance, published by Springer.

In 2010, he and two co-authors won the Society of Actuaries Award for the Best Paper published in the North American Actuarial Journal.

Since 2006, he has taught, conducted research and held administrative roles at the University of Western Ontario, and garnered recognitions for excellence in teaching and research. Previously, he held academic positions at Brunel University, London, UK; University of British Columbia; University of Waterloo; and University of Alberta.

He spent short-term research visits at several institutions including the Isaac Newton Institute for Mathematical Sciences, University of Cambridge, England; Maxwell Institute for Mathematical Sciences, Scotland; Centre for Mathematical Physics and Stochastics, University of Aarhus, Denmark; Institute for Mathematics and its Applications, University of Minnesota, USA; University of Adelaide, Australia; University of Wollongong in New South Wales, Australia; and Centro de Investigacion en Matematicas, Mexico.

Mamon holds professional designations conferred by various British learned societies. He is a Fellow and Chartered Mathematician of the Institute of Mathematics and its Applications; Chartered Scientist of the Science Council; and Fellow of the Higher Education Academy. He is also a Fellow of the Royal Society of Arts and the Royal Statistical Society, and was an elected member of the London Mathematical Society.

He began PhD studies in Mathematical Finance at the University of Alberta, and completed his dissertation during a research visit at the University of Adelaide, Australia. He was supervised by Robert J. Elliott.
