= Earthsearch =

Earthsearch: A Ten-Part Adventure Serial in Time and Space is a British science fiction radio series written by James Follett. It consists of ten half-hour episodes. It was first broadcast on BBC Radio 4 between January and March 1981. There is also a novelisation by Follett of the same name. The series has been released on cassette and audio CD. Since 2003 it has been re-broadcast, several times in the Seventh Dimension science fiction slot on BBC 7 and its successor BBC Radio 4 Extra.

A sequel, Earthsearch 2 was broadcast between January and March 1982. There is also a novelisation by Follett under the title Earthsearch 2: Deathship. The series has been released on cassette and audio CD, and has been rerun several times on BBC Radio 4 Extra beginning in 2003.

== Earthsearch ==
Earthsearch
- Cover art for the original 1993 audio cassette release (Original artwork by Andrew Skilleter)
- Running time: 30 minutes
- Country of origin: UK
- Language: English
- Home station: BBC Radio 4 Extra
- Starring: Sean Arnold; Amanda Murray; Haydn Wood; Kathryn Hurlbutt
- Written by: James Follett
- Directed by: Glyn Dearman
- Original release: 6 January – 10 March 1981 (last repeated June 2021)
- No. of series: 1
- No. of episodes: 10 per series
- Audio format: Stereo

=== Main cast ===
- Commander Telson - Sean Arnold
- Sharna - Amanda Murray
- Darv - Haydn Wood
- Astra - Kathryn Hurlbutt
- Angel One - Sonia Fraser
- Angel Two - Gordon Reid

Other cast (across the series):

- Commander Sinclair - Christopher Scott
- Simon - David Bradshaw
- The Sentinel - Alexander John
- George - John MacAndrew
- Helan - Judy Franklin
- Emperor Thorden - John Bott
- Thail - Graham Faulkner
- Spegal - Stephen Garlick
- The Custodian - Eve Calfe
- Fagor - Sion Probert
- Krol - Michael Spice
- Dren - John Webb
- Lenart - Jane Knowles
- Tandor - Pauline Letts
- No. 41 - John Church

=== Episodes ===
1. Planetfall
2. First Footprint City
3. Sands of Kyros
4. The Solaric Empire
5. The Pools of Time
6. Across the Abyss
7. New Blood
8. Marooned
9. Star Cluster: Tersus Nine
10. Earthfall

=== Story ===
Three crew-generations previously, the starship Challenger - a vast ten-mile-long survey vessel – was launched from Earth on an interstellar mission to search the universe for an Earth-type planet to colonise. This has been unsuccessful, and the ship's once enormous crew-count has now been reduced to four. Telson (the ship's Commander), Sharna (Science officer), Darv and Astra are the third-generation crew- the only survivors of the disastrous Great Meteoroid Strike which seriously damaged the ship two decades previously, killing the entire second-generation crew and rendering large areas of the ship "uncontrolled" and inaccessible to its electronic systems.

From infancy, the four third-generation crew members (now in their early twenties) have been raised by robots and by the Angels – mysterious unseen beings who run the ship and who only manifest as disembodied voices. Darv, the most sceptical and enquiring of the crew members, suspects that the Angels are merely computers; but the others consider them as "Guardian Angels" and work entirely under their guidance.

With no suitably colonisable planet found after over a hundred years of searching, a crew-vote is taken and the Challenger sets a course for the return to Earth. Darv and Astra, while exploring one of the uncontrolled zones, find a survey recording of an Earth-type planet called Paradise. (In the accompanying novelisation, Darv is alone when he makes the discovery.) As is standard procedure, the crew enter suspended animation in order to prevent ageing and possible death during the many years of journey time.

Unrevealed to the crew, the Angels (who are the ship's control computers; their name being an acronym of ANcillary Guardian of Environment and Life ) have their own agenda. They desire absolute control and mastery over any colony resulting from the mission. To this end, they covertly engineered the apparent accident which killed the second-generation crew (who would otherwise have ended the mission before the Angels wanted it to end) and have kept the third-generation crew sexually immature and innocent via drugs and disinformation in order to keep them more tractable. However, their machinations have begun to backfire already. Their requirement of a minimum human crew of four to man the Challenger's control room requires the Angels to work mainly via suggestion and manipulation. Also, the Great Meteoroid Strike damaged the ship and their control over it more than was planned, including damage to their own memory banks, which in turn deprived them of vital information about the Theory of Relativity. Concerned that the discovery of the Paradise recording may convince the crew members to change their plans, the Angels suppress Darv's and Astra's memories of the survey recording by hypnotic manipulation, in Darv's case by using violent, nightmare-inducing imagery.

Reaching the planetary system, the Challenger's crew are horrified to discover that Earth has vanished altogether, with the Moon now occupying Earth's former orbit. Although the crew locate a large city on the Moon, they are unable to receive any answers to their communications and are unable to leave the ship to explore. This situation is changed when Darv and Astra enter an uncontrolled zone within the Challenger and locate a space shuttle previously unknown to the Angels. Using this, they visit the city, named "first Footprint City", and discover the Moon Sentinel, a computerised guardian and archive whom they can question. From the Sentinel they discover that while only one hundred and fifteen years of shipboard time has passed during the Challenger's entire mission, due to the ship's use of near-lightspeed travel and the effects of time dilation much more time has passed on Earth – over one million years. During this time, the Earth was removed from the Solar System via a tremendous feat of interstellar engineering – desiring to protect the planet from the risk of increased solar activity, the inhabitants of Earth took the planet to orbit another, safer star. The Sentinel does not know which planetary system Earth now occupies, but notes that if the Challenger's crew genuinely are descendants of Earth people they will think as the people of Earth thought, and will find the Earth by following that pattern.

Seeking more clues in their new Earthsearch mission, the Challenger travels to Kyros (the third planet of the Solar System, and a desert world). However, Darv's enquiring and rebellious mind is now putting him at odds with the Angels again, who are forced to surreptitiously discipline him for a second time. Opting to work in the ship's farm galleries for a while, Darv develops a taste for unprocessed fruit, and the hormone suppressants which keep him sexually undeveloped begin to wear off. He introduces Astra to the same diet, with similar effects. On arrival in Kyros orbit, Darv and Astra take the shuttle down to the planet surface to investigate a buried gravitational anomaly. While there, they are kidnapped, leaving the Challenger minus half its crew (and consequently stranded).

Darv and Astra's kidnappers turn out to be members of the Solaric Empire - an organisation based on the fifth moon of Zelda (the gas-giant fourth planet in the Solar System) and consisting of the remaining humans in the system. Darv and Astra's artificially-maintained sexual immaturity leads to them being labelled as poor-quality alien replicas of human beings. Their stories of the past of Earth and their mission are considered a threat to the position of the Solaric Emperor Thorden, who is persuaded by his ruthless chief prosecutor, Helan, to have them executed. This is thwarted by the arrival of the Challenger (Telson and Sharna having worked out how to use surgical androids as temporary control room crew replacements).

Following the subsequent standoff Thorden offers to join the Challenger on its search for Earth. He bluntly confirms to the crew that the Angels are computers, of the dangerous "freewill" kind that develop an obsession with power and which the Solaric Empire fought and won a war against (the defeated machines were imprisoned in a vault on Kyros, the anomaly investigated earlier by the Challenger crew). He plans for his own security and future dominance over the mission by ensuring that the space ferry which he brings to and docks within the Challenger as personal transport is heavily armed. He also smuggles on board a fearsome warrior android called Fagor.

Unknown to the crew, he strikes a deal with the Angels to share power over the Earth once it is found. However, the Angels have other plans. Once the humans on ship have entered suspended animation for the next leg of the journey, they cancel the crew's hormone suppressants and allow them to develop to full sexual maturity, suppressing any shock or curiosity via post-hypnotic suggestion (although Darv and Astra, who had previously begun to develop following their rejection of the processed food, had already begun a fully sexual relationship before this).

When they next revive the crew, the Angels allow the revival process to go wrong for Thorden, killing him as a result. Though Darv is suspicious of the Angels, he and the crew are more concerned with the drifting ship which the Challenger has picked up on its radar – which turns out to be the Challenger II, their own craft's sister ship, which appears derelict. Sharna and Telson go over in the shuttle to investigate, and discover that the Challenger II is still populated by the descendants of its original crew but has been crippled by civil wars between them. The survivors are divided between the initially welcoming, highly religious Earth Worshippers who are in conflict with the more anarchic but historically-aware Underpeople - the Earth Worshippers decide to hang Sharna and Telson for unintentional blasphemy. (In the novelisation, they also destroy the shuttle.)

Meanwhile, the warrior android Fagor begins to wreak havoc onboard Challenger in revenge for Thorden's death: Darv and Astra are forced to flee from him in Thorden's ferry. Aided by Lenart, a female Underperson, they rescue Telson and Sharna from the Earth Worshippers, but their subsequent visit to the Underpeople puts them into further peril. While welcoming, the female-dominated Underpeople have chosen to stabilise their society by keeping their men almost permanently in suspended animation, reviving them only temporarily to serve as sperm sources for impregnation. Darv and Telson have been targeted to bolster the Underpeople's dwindling genetic stock.

Successfully fleeing Challenger II in the shuttle and Thorden's ferry (in the novelisation, just the ferry), the Challenger crew discovers that Challenger itself has disappeared. Fagor has seized control of the ship and is accelerating it away with the intention of plunging it into a star to avenge Thorden. Abandoning the too slow shuttle, the crew carries out a harrowing pursuit in the ferry, constantly trying to produce enough velocity to cut down on a fatal time and oxygen shortfall. The Angels manage to trick Fagor into leaving the Challenger and flying via his own onboard jets to attack the ferry, hoping that the humans will destroy him with the ferry's armament. This is successful, with Darv discovering that firing the cannon can also produce sufficient thrust to reach the Challenger in time. The crew re-enter suspended animation for the next part of the journey, but during their medical examinations the Angels discover that Astra is pregnant.

Wishing to maintain control of a future crew – and already wary of the rebellious Darv – the Angels plan to deliver Astra's baby secretly. With these plans thwarted when they're obliged to bring Astra out of suspended animation to avoid a miscarriage, they're also forced to awake everyone in order to avoid arousing her suspicions. This is a particular risk for them as the ship is by then passing close to the Paradise planetary system as detailed in the records found earlier by Darv. The Angels fear that the crew may still opt to colonise an undeveloped planet rather than lead the Angels to dominion over a developed one.

Discovering her own pregnancy, Astra then tells Darv; suspecting that the Angels will try to harm the baby, she finally rejects them: refusing to go back into suspended animation, she and Darv flee into the Challenger's uncontrolled zones to escape the Angels’ control. They discover and set up home in the ship's long-lost terraforming centre, where there are more shuttles. While there, they witness survey footage of the Paradise planet on the centre's control screens and eventually deduce that these are live video broadcasts from an instrument package left on the planet by the second-generation crew. This in turn allows them to pinpoint the position of Paradise.

Revealing what they have found to Telson and Sharna, Darv and Astra choose to leave the Challenger altogether and set up home on Paradise. With Sharna's help, they persuade Telson to bring the ship close enough to Paradise to allow for an easy shuttle journey to reconnoitre the planet. However the Angels block the Challenger's controls, and attempt to change the crew's minds by admitting to the existence of Paradise but also overstating its difficulties, for example the electromagnetic radiation that lights up the polar sky. However Astra and Darv are not convinced and decide on a one-way shuttle trip to Paradise, the planet being just within range. They reach the planet successfully but lose all of their supplies when the shuttle crashes into the sea. Forced to live rough, and often terrified by the hardships of their new life, they make the best of what they have. Meanwhile, back on the Challenger, Telson and Sharna discover the physical location of the Angels within the ship – their Central Switching Room. Despite the Angels’ desperate attempts to protect themselves (via nightmare-inducing hallucinatory barriers), Telson and Sharna reach the room and finally see the Angels as they really are – two complex racks of organic integrated wetware circuits which could be destroyed with two blows of a hammer.

Having finally broken the control which the Angels wielded over the crew's life, Telson and Sharna have them at their mercy. They strike a deal whereby the Angels will take the Challenger – now crewed by surgical androids – and continue the Earthsearch mission. Unhindered by the Angels, Telson and Sharna follow Astra and Darv to settle on Paradise, successfully landing on the planet with appropriate supplies and resources to begin their colony. All four former crew members watch the exhaust trail of the Challenger as it leaves Paradise orbit. They remind themselves that they will need to tell their children warning stories about the Angels, just in case they ever return.

=== Mythological approach ===
Earthsearch eventually reveals itself as an inverted creation myth, providing a possible "factual" story which could lie behind various Earth legends. The story deliberately misleads the listener in order to gradually reveal that the planet Paradise is in fact the Earth of human history as we know it (with the original "Earth" being a previous forgotten homeworld for the human race) and that the legends of authoritative and fear-inducing "angels" refer to the domineering computers. Various clues are presented in that "Earth" and its sister planet Kyros and Zelda (the latter two clearly analogous to Mars and Jupiter) are the second, third and fourth planets of their Solar System rather than the third, fourth and fifth, while Paradise is the third planet of its own Solar System (as is humankind's Earth), although the different planetary names are at one point attributed to an administrative change of nomenclature.

== Earthsearch II ==
Earthsearch II
- Running time: 30 minutes
- Country of origin: UK
- Language: English
- Home station: BBC Radio 4 Extra
- Starring: Sean Arnold; Amanda Murray; Haydn Wood; Kathryn Hurlbutt
- Written by: James Follett
- Directed by: Glyn Dearman
- Original release: 25 April – 27 June 1982 (Last repeated February 2022)
- No. of series: 1
- No. of episodes: 10 per series
- Audio format: Stereo

=== Cast ===
- Commander Telson - Sean Arnold
- Sharna - Amanda Murray
- Darv - Haydn Wood
- Astra - Kathryn Hurlbutt
- Elka - Jill Lidstone
- Bran - Michael Maloney
- Angel One - Sonia Fraser
- Angel Two - Gordon Reid
- Tidy - David Gooderson
- George - Stephen Garlick
- Solaria - Pauline Letts
- Elkeran - Nicholas Courtney
- Halston - David McAlister
- Theros - John Warner
- SA7 - Spencer Banks
- Kraken - Crawford Logan
- Peeron - George Parsons
- Earthvoice - Michael Tudor Barnes

The casting for Earthsearch II featured the return of several supporting actors from the original Earthsearch, playing different roles. The part of George the agricultural android (originally played by John McAndrew) was recast for Stephen Garlick (who had played Spegal in Earthsearch). Pauline Letts (Solaria) had previously played the role of Tandor in Earthsearch.

=== Episodes ===
1. Return
2. Flood
3. Surrender
4. Solaria
5. Sundeath
6. Supermass
7. Deathship
8. Megalomania
9. Earth
10. Earthvoice

=== Story ===
The story of Earthsearch 2 continues the adventures of the crew of the starship Challenger (Telson, Sharna, Darv and Astra) begun in the previous serial, Earthsearch, which told the story of their quest for their lost ancestral home planet of Earth (which had moved to orbit a new and unknown star when its citizens realised their original sun was going to go nova). At the end of the serial, the four crewmembers had chosen to settle on the sufficiently Earth-like planet Paradise and escape the ruthless, manipulative control of the Challenger's megalomaniacal control computers, Angel One and Angel Two. While the Angels departed Paradise orbit to continue the Earthsearch mission (and to achieve their aim of dominating an entire civilisation), the humans began their new life on their new homeworld.

Earthsearch 2 begins four years later, when Telson, Sharna, Darv and Astra have settled into their life on Paradise (assisted by two androids, the agricultural machine George and the argumentative general-purpose service unit Tidy). Both couples now have young children - Darv and Astra have the twins Elka and Savin, and Telson and Sharna have their son Bran. Despite the colonists' embrace of Paradise as home, the lifestyle is proving to be difficult and full of hardships. Sharna's loss of what would have been her second child raises questions about the sustainability of the small colony as well as bringing up differences of opinion on how (and whether) to use the remaining technology and resources (including their surviving planetary shuttle). When Savin is unexpectedly killed by a 'monster' that appears from the sea, the colonists are placed under further strain. Noticing the appearance of an unidentified artefact in planetary orbit, Telson and Darv fly up towards it in the shuttle, to discover that it is an eight-mile long spaceship called Voyager 30 and apparently part of an Earth-originated survey mission.

Appearances are deceptive. The spaceship is in fact the returning Challenger: repaired, shortened, refitted and still operated by the Angels (as well by a team of control room androids overseen by Android Surgeon-General Kraken). The Angels are now being attacked by mysterious transmissions apparently aimed at damaging or destroying organic computers such as themselves and the Challenger's higher intelligence androids. As humans are totally unaffected by the attacks, the Angels require human assistance in order to seek out and destroy the transmissions at source, and have therefore returned to Paradise to recruit the only humans they can obtain. However, the Angels do not reveal this information, and instead feign an interest in the welfare of the colony in an attempt to gain the trust of the humans. At the same time they have secretly sent an android to kidnap the children (the same "sea monster" which accidentally killed Savin in a bungled abduction attempt).

When rejected by the suspicious humans, the Angels resort to sabotage on a planetary scale, using terraforming equipment from the Challenger to melt Paradise's polar ice caps and thus raise the sea level in an attempt to get their former crew to rejoin them on the ship. The resulting flooding begins to submerge all of the land, forcing the settlers to abandon their colony and use their shuttle as a floating ark, even down to loading breeding pairs of animals into the shuttle cargo bay. The crew survive and hold out against the Angels' plans until a series of accidents loses them their drinking water, forcing a surrender. They make the best of things by demanding a concession in the shape of a reversal of the flood (so that the animals can be released and survive), following which they fly their shuttle up to the Challenger.

On board the Challenger, the colonists make attempts to regain control over both the Angels and the ship's control room, but are thwarted when the Angels kidnap the children from the shuttle. The adults are gassed by a surgical android and fall unconscious. When they come round, they discover that the ship has long left the Paradise system and that they have been in suspended animation for sixteen years. However, the children have been awake the whole time, and have aged normally, now being between eighteen and nineteen years old and firmly under the influence of the Angels. Elka appears friendly and enthusiastic, but Bran is now both hostile and the commander of the Challenger. He demonstrates harsh suspicion and aggression towards his parents and the other two adults, even threatening to kill them should they challenge his authority.

En route to the source system of the attacks, the Challenger encounters a free-floating fifty-mile wide parabolic dish which the Angels decide to use as raw material for shielding. Telson, Sharna, Darv and Astra are sent to investigate the dish. They discover that it is an abandoned artificial sun called Solaria D, used by the Earth during its transit to its new sun, and presided over by an Angel-like control computer called Solaria. Despite her apparent benevolence, Solaria is revealed to have been abandoned by Earth once she developed murderous megalomaniacal tendencies. Darv succeeds in destroying her. During their stay on Solaria D, the crew discover the name (though not the location) of Earth's new home star, Novita Six.

Returning to the Challenger, the crew notice that Solaria D is now moving in an anomalous way. They discover that the artificial sun is now in the grip of the gravity well of a black hole, and that the Challenger is following it. Attempts to escape from the black hole are hampered by the fact that the human crew have no access to the Challenger's control room, where Android Surgeon-General Kraken has had his reasoning capacity damaged by the continuing attacks and is no longer responding to or obeying instructions. With the Angels drastically weakened by the attacks and unable to assist, the humans attempt to storm the control room, which is defended by android warriors. The assault fails when the crew run out of time and the Challenger is pulled into the black hole.

The crew regain consciousness to find themselves on a gigantic plain surrounded by many different kinds of abandoned starships, including the Challenger. They discover that they have in fact landed unharmed on an enormous artificial construct - a "gravity platform" which merely resembles a black hole and forms part of Earth's long-range defences, acting as a trap for potentially hostile vessels. The chief engineer of Spaceguard Six, Theros, refuses to release either the Challenger or its crew as he deems the Angels too much of a threat. Not only have they integrated themselves into the entire structure of the ship (making their removal from it effectively impossible), Theros suspects that they may have interposed themselves into the brains of the Challenger's crew. When Darv locates the Spaceguard's gravitational control room and reverses the field, he frees the Challenger but at the cost of destroying Spaceguard Six.

The ship continues its journey, but immediately runs into further problems when debris from the Spaceguard seriously damages the ship's life support systems and farm galleries, threatening the lives of all humans and organic computers on the ship. With the inexperienced and insecure Bran unable to cope (and undermined by Elka, who secretly dominates him and dictates his actions at the prompting of the Angels), Telson regains command of the Challenger and succeeds in organising the crew to deal with the problems. A second assault on the control room is more successful, but attracts the wrath of the near-invincible Android Surgeon-General Kraken, who kidnaps Darv and Astra to replace his destroyed control room androids. Now suffering catastrophic delusions about seizing the power of stars, Kraken is placing the ship at drastic risk. With the assistance of their android Tidy, the crew manage to destroy Kraken and regain control of the ship. Telson discovers that Kraken has coincidentally selected Novita Six as the ship's next target star.

Arriving in the Novita Six system, the Challenger finally reaches its original home, Earth. However, the planet does not look like the Earth that the crew have seen in recordings. It is almost totally dead, with very little water and no rain. The only sign of life is a huge ten-mile-high tower on the equator, with a tiny village nearby. The crew fly down to the village, and meet Peeron, the leader. They discover that the Earth's civilisation has collapsed a long time ago, and the human race is reduced to eking out a meagre living from a tiny spring that grows weaker every year. It appears that the humans will be extinct in a short period of time. The Challenger crew use the terraforming systems on the Challenger to bring rain to Earth and create a stable weather pattern which will allow the people to flourish.

The crew examine the tower, finding that there is a door set into one side which cannot be opened. Peeron says that many of his predecessors have made attempts over the centuries - for example, by hitting the door with battering rams - but it will not budge. It is said that it is held shut by a "lock of knowledge". Darv eventually works out how to open the ingeniously simple lock, which requires a low grade of technology which would only be available to people who have already worked out basic principles of science and engineering. The door is a very close/accurate fit in the aperture, and contains mild heating elements that cause it to expand and lock in place. These heaters do not heat it to the point that it is warm to the touch. Simply attaching a refrigeration system to the door and cooling it a few degrees causes the door to shrink and move freely.

When the crew open the door, they enter the tower, leaving Peeron and his people outside. They discover that the tower contains a colossal library, presided over by the artificial intelligence "Earthvoice" which serves as both the voice of the library and as a "guardian". Earthvoice explains to the crew that the tower was constructed by the people of Earth as a repository of all human knowledge when their last great civilisation was collapsing. The lock was designed so that the people could not enter until they had already worked out how to make some technology for themselves. Unfortunately, Earthvoice's abilities do not include weather control, so although he has successfully defended Earth's legacy of knowledge he has been helpless to deal with the deterioration of the planet's environmental conditions.

Earthvoice has already communicated with the Angels, presenting himself as friendly and subservient. Prompted by Elka to work with the Angels, Earthvoice re-establishes contact with them and is welcomed eagerly. He admits to having been the source of the attacks which have damaged the angels but states that they were a programming directive which he has now overridden. To the humans' horror, Earthvoice and the Angels agree to share both the library's knowledge and power over the Earth, with the Angels also urging that Earthvoice exterminates the crew for safety. Earthvoice begins to transfer the knowledge - however, the Angels have fallen into a final trap. Earthvoice has always intended to destroy them, and he now launches one last brutal and specialised attack on the Angels from close range, erasing their consciousness and memory facilities.

Rather than interfere further with the primitive human culture on Earth, the crew seal the door to the tower and return to the Challenger. With the Angels now reduced to subservient and "quite brainless" computer systems, they head back to their chosen home, Paradise, to rebuild their colony.

=== Engineering ===
It would initially seem that using two computers to run a star-ship lacks redundancy. The ship originally had 3 angels in charge, seemingly giving sufficient redundancy should one computer malfunction. However the design of the Angels was itself flawed, with the general mode of failure the development of megalomaniac tendencies. When one and two fail they destroy the third computer. Later on Earth this flaw in the Angels design was recognised and rectified, leading to the computer that is Earthvoice, and also explaining why Earthvoice is designed/programmed to destroy computers of "Angel" design, as they pose a threat to other lifeforms.

=== Plot similarities ===
Elements of episodes 6 and 7 ("Supermass" and "Deathship"), featuring the appearance of the artificial black hole Spaceguard Six which draws in the Challenger, have plot similarities to the Blake's 7 episode "Dawn of the Gods". This episode (also penned by Follett and first broadcast on BBC Television on 28 January 1980) features an artificial black hole which draws in the Liberator and in which the crew wake up surrounded by captured ships.

The plot of the first series is also somewhat similar to the Space:1999 episode "Mission of the Darians", in which the Alphans discover an enormous spacecraft whose inhabitants have descended into barbarism after an environmental disaster on board the spaceship.

== See also ==
- List of fictional computers § Radio
- Earthsearch Mindwarp
