= Swanwick, Derbyshire =

Derbyshire village

Coordinates: 53.075°N 1.398°W

Swanwick
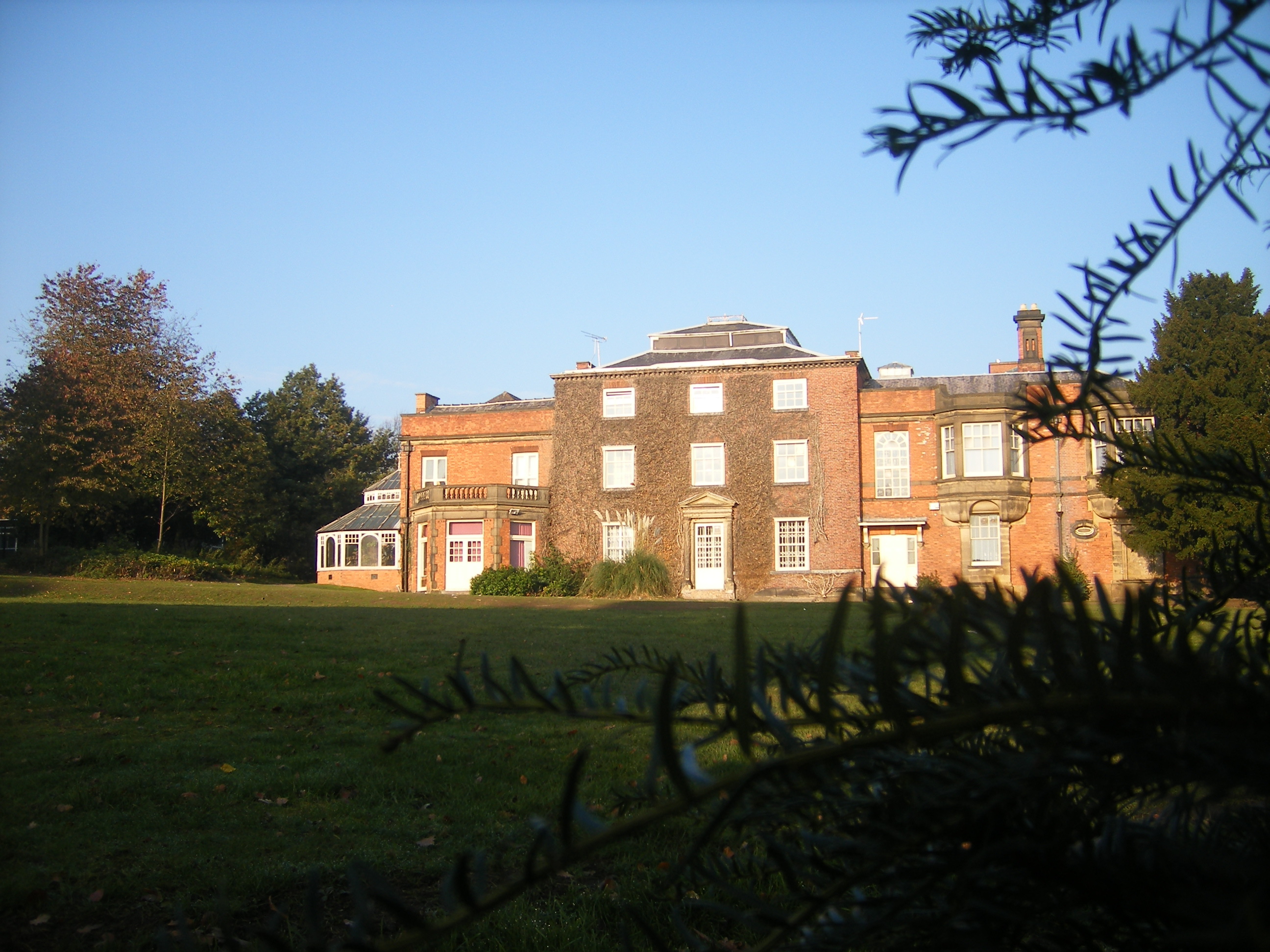
- Swanwick Hall

- Location within Derbyshire
- Population: 5,185 (2021)
- OS grid reference: SK404532
- District: Amber Valley
- Shire county: Derbyshire
- Region: East Midlands
- Country: England
- Sovereign state: United Kingdom
- Post town: ALFRETON
- Postcode district: DE55
- Dialling code: 01773
- Police: Derbyshire
- Fire: Derbyshire
- Ambulance: East Midlands
- UK Parliament: Amber Valley

Pronounced
(listen)

Swanwick (/ˈswɒnɪk/) is a village in Derbyshire, England, also a parish within the Amber Valley district.

== Geography ==
It has a population of 5,316 at the 2001 census, falling to 5,084 at the 2011 Census.

It has a number of shops, pubs and other businesses, a Church of St Andrews, as well as Methodist and Baptist churches. There is also a Christian conference centre, the largest in the UK. Now largely urbanised, the parish still has some remaining agricultural land to the north and west.

=== Economy ===
In the northern part of the parish an industrial estate on the former Swanwick Colliery site incorporates the Thornton's Confectionery factory along with other businesses.

Granada Motorway Services and Mobil Oil opened a service area on September 26 1989 at the Watchorn Island on the A38, with a 61-bed three-star hotel, with a meeting room for 50 people. The £3.8m site was built by Agate Group of Heanor from September 1988. It became the Alfreton Service Area (or Alfreton/Swanwick). In March 1990 the hotel received a full drinks licence; previously only residents or diners could buy drinks. Watchorn Island has the third-highest number of road accidents in Derbyshire.

== History ==
The name Swanwick is derived from the Old English Swana, meaning "herdsmen", and wic, meaning a group of buildings. The settlement is thought to have begun in the vicinity of the farm above The Hayes (meaning "enclosure"), on which a number of ancient footpath routes converge. It is first mentioned in 1304 in Sir Thomas Chaworth's grants to Beauchief Abbey. Sir Thomas was the Lord of the Manor of Alfreton, which encompassed Swanwick. The area was exploited for coal from early times, first with small pits in the locality known as The Delves (meaning 'diggings') and later with a major colliery in the north of the parish, which closed in the 1960s.

Several families figure highly in Swanwick's long history. The Turners, beginning with George Turner in 1620, owned the local mineral rights and became coal magnates, until the death of Charles Turner in 1736. John Turner built Swanwick Old Hall around 1690 (demolished by 1812). Elizabeth Turner had a school built in 1740 to provide education for 20 children from poor families. The school house is now a private residence. The other most significant family was the Woods, who occupied the original Swanwick Hall ('The Old Hall') in what is known as Wood's Yard. It was a substantial yeoman's residence of 1678, as evidenced by a datestone high up on the dormer gables, along with the crest adopted by the Wood family.

Swanwick Hall, was built from 1771–72 by Derbyshire architect Joseph Pickford Of Derby, for Hugh Wood, a wealthy mineral rights owner and landowner in Swanwick after the Turner family left. It originally was a three-storey, five-bay red-brick house with limited stone dressings built south-east of the Swanwick. The house was extended in 1812, two years before Hugh's death, and in 1891 by Christopher Wood J.P. It was then sold for £10,376 to Derbyshire County Council in 1920 when it would then become a grammar school.

Swanwick Hayes – now the Hayes Conference Centre – was constructed in the 1850s as the home of Mr Fitzherbert Wright. In the early 1900s, it was converted into a conference centre, and operates as such to this day. The Hayes gained notoriety during World War II, when it served as a prisoner of war camp for both German and Italian prisoners. Franz von Werra, a Luftwaffe officer, escaped from here; he was recaptured at nearby RAF Hucknall, while trying to steal an aircraft. A film entitled The One That Got Away, and starring Hardy Krüger, was made of his exploits.

== St Andrew's Church ==
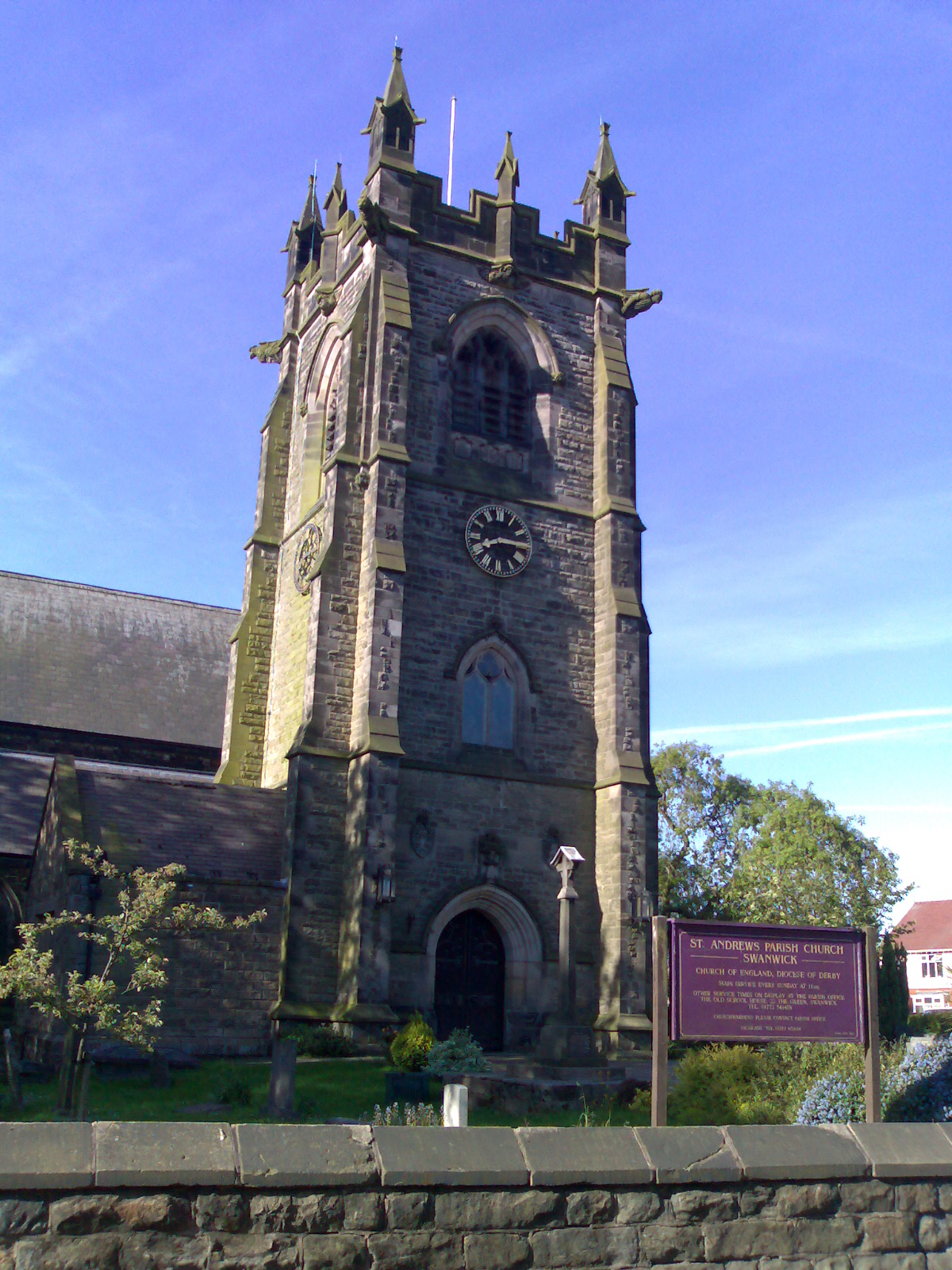
St. Andrew's Church

In 1856 the Revd John Wood gave land for a church to be built in Swanwick, at which time the village's industries consisted of coal mining, farming, the Butterley ironworks, framework knitting, shoemaking and a newly established silk stocking maker.with the crest adopted by the Wood family. The Woods succeeded the Turners as owners of most of the local mineral rights, and Hugh Wood later moved into the newer Hall with his wife; a painting of his later children, painted by Joseph Wright of Derby in 1789, used to hang in its dining room. It is now a secondary school.

With the aid of a donation of £3,230 from Francis Wright the building was completed in 1859 with a nave of five bays, north and south aisles, north porch and bell turret over the west gable. The pointed arches on both sides of the nave and in the chancel imply that the architect, Benjamin Wilson, had Early English architecture in mind when he designed the building.

The Church celebrated its 150th anniversary on Sunday 26 September 2010. The Bishop of Derby, the Rt Revd Dr. Alastair Redfern, presided at a celebratory service. The anniversary was also marked by the publication of Swanwick 1304–2010 – the Story of our Village, which sold over 600 copies.

== Schools ==
The village has four schools: Swanwick Hall, Swanwick Primary School, Swanwick Pre-School and Swanwick School & Sports College.

== See also ==
- Listed buildings in Swanwick, Derbyshire
