= Ashfield School, Kirkby-in-Ashfield =

Ashfield School

Location
- Sutton Road; Kirkby-in-Ashfield, Nottinghamshire, NG17 8HP; England; 53°06′36″N 1°16′13″W

Information
- Type: Academy
- Motto: Aspire
- Established: 1964
- Department for Education URN: 137981 Tables
- Ofsted: Reports
- Headteacher: Jenny Brown
- Gender: Coeducational
- Age: 11 to 19
- Enrolment: 2,584
- Capacity: 3,146
- Houses: Byron, Chesterfield, Coates, Hargreaves, Trent and Thoroton (former: Darwin and Larwood)
- Colours: Yellow (Byron), Green (Chesterfield), Red (Coates), Purple (Hargreaves), Blue (Trent) and Orange (Thoroton)
- Website: www.ashfield.notts.sch.uk

Ashfield School or Ashfield Comprehensive School is a large secondary school with academy status located in Kirkby-in-Ashfield, Nottinghamshire, England, which educates pupils with ages 11–19.

The school has approximately 2,500 students, split into six houses – Trent, Chesterfield, Thoroton, Byron, Hargreaves and Coates. The six houses have students from all year groups except those who are from the sixth form.

The current headteacher of the school is Jenny Brown, who succeeded John Maher in 2025.

== History ==
Built in 1964 as Nottinghamshire's first purpose-built comprehensive school, Ashfield School now has a self-contained 40-acre (160,000 m^{2}) campus. Facilities include computer suites, an ICT Centre, on-site sports facilities including four gymnasia, tennis courts, all weather sports fields, running track and a swimming pool. Other resources on-site include music studios, a tiered theatre and drama complex, photographic darkroom, print making and ceramics studios, fifteen science laboratories, a business centre, a CAD/CAM centre, library and careers library.

In 2007, the sixth form (Post 16) centre opened, with a large cafeteria-like area, and over 30 classrooms, for both A Level and vocational studies.

2012 saw the closure of the music block next to the sixth form centre. This was replaced in 2013 by the Resource Centre, an extension of the sixth form which includes 3 classrooms (with walls that can slide to create one large room) and a library/study area. The latter is exclusive to sixth form students.

A new drama/music block was built in late 2012, between the science and maths blocks, as the previous block had been removed to make way for the Resource Centre.

Summer 2020 saw an extension onto one of the science blocks, which saw the addition of 3 new science classrooms.

== Ashfield Skills Centre (ASC) ==
The Ashfield Skills Centre is a £7.1million project which delivers six learning environments. The centre includes:

- Eight vocational units equipped to industry standard specification to mimic an industrial or commercial context. Course content and delivery are provided by industrial and commercial training providers in textiles, business, child care, health and beauty and ICT.
- Three industrial units: deliver vocational courses in construction, plumbing, automotive, electrical, catering and hospitality courses delivered by industrial training providers RAC, Carillion and Charnwood.
- Resource Centre: built in 2013, this million pound extension offers a study area for all sixth form students.

== Notable alumni ==
- Lee Anderson, Reform UK MP and former Deputy Chairman of the Conservative Party.
- Chris Gascoyne, actor.
- James Graham, playwright and screenwriter.
- Oliver Hynd, a Paralympic swimmer, with a gold medal in the 400m freestyle at the 2016 Summer Olympics
- Sam Hynd, a former Paralympic swimmer.
