= James Follett =

English author and screenwriter (1939–2021)

- Born: 27 July 1939; Tolworth, England
- Died: 10 January 2021 (aged 81)
- Occupation: Writer
- Writing career
- Genre: Science fiction
- Website: www.james-follett.co.uk

James Follett (27 July 1939 – 10 January 2021) was an English author and screenwriter. Follett became a full-time fiction writer in 1976, after resigning from contract work as a technical writer for the Ministry of Defence. He wrote over 20 novels, several television plays and many radio dramas.

He died in January 2021 at the age of 81.

== Works ==
=== Novels ===
- The Doomsday Ultimatum (1976)
- Crown Court (1977)
- Ice (1978)
- U-700 (1979), based on his radio play The U-boat that lost its Nerve, in turn based on a true story during World War II.
- Churchill's Gold (1980)
- The Tiptoe Boys (1981) (filmed as Who Dares Wins)
- Earthsearch (1981, a novelization of Follett's radio drama Earthsearch)
- Deathship (1982, a novelization of Follett's radio drama Earthsearch II)
- Dominator (1984)
- Swift (1985). Set in 1996, it foresaw the proliferation of Mobile phones
- A Cage of Eagles (1989)
- Mirage (1988). A fictionalised account of the transfer of practically all documents and drawings of the Mirage III to the state of Israel during a temporary French arms embargo in the 1960s, through Sulzer Aircraft in Switzerland. These events led to the creation of the later IAI Kfir jet fighter in the 1970s.
- Torus (1990)
- Trojan (1991). Set mainly in 1999, Trojan, predicted high-definition television, hard-drive video recording and keyboard-free touchpad computers.
- Savant (1993)
- Mindwarp (1993, a prequel to Folllet's radio drama Earthsearch)
- Those in Peril (1995)
- Sabre (1997)
- Second Atlantis (1998, a revised version of Ice)
- Temple of the Winds (2000)
- Wicca (2000)
- The Silent Vulcan (2002 hardback) ISBN 0-7278-5712-6
- A Forest of Eagles (2004 hardback, a sequel to A Cage of Eagles)
- Return of the Eagles (2004 hardback, concluding the Eagles trilogy)
- Hellborn (2009) (eBook)

=== Radio ===
(AT indicates the play was heard on BBC Radio 4's Afternoon Theatre, a 60-minute slot; JBM that it was in Radio 4's Just Before Midnight 15-minute slot, and SNT: Radio 4's Saturday Night Theatre of 90 minutes.)

- Rules of Asylum (1973*, 90 minutes), Wiped by the BBC, but kept in the form of a domestic FM recording by Follett himself and subsequently rebroadcast on BBC 7 and since 2011 on BBC Radio 4 Extra in three half-hour instalments.
- The Light of A Thousand Suns (1974*, SNT), a Cold War techno-thriller set in 1995
- The Doppelganger Machine (1974, AT)
- Speculator Sport (1974, AT)
- The U-Boat That Lost Its Nerve (1975, SNT), a WWII historical drama regarding an informal trial of a German U-boat officer in a POW camp.
- The War in Secret (1975, 3 episodes of 45 mins)
- The Last Riot (1975, AT)
- Jumbo (1976, SNT)
- No Time on Our Side (1976, 60 mins)
- The Rabid Summer (1976, SNT)
- The Twisted Image (1977*, AT)
- The Spanish Package (1977, SNT)
- The War Behind the Wire (1977, 4 episodes of 45 mins)
- A Touch of Slander (1977, AT)
- The Destruction Factor (1978*, SNT; a serial in 6 30-minute parts, ecological science fiction)
- Vendetta for a Judge (1979, SNT)
- The Bionic Blob (1979*, JBM)
- The Devil to Play (1979*, JBM)
- The Bionic Blob and The Case of the Stolen Wavelengths (1979, JBM)
- Softly Steal the Hours to Dawn (1979, JBM)
- The Man Who Invented Yesterday (1980, JBM)
- The Long Lonely Voyage of U-395 (1980, SNT)
- Oboe at the Embassy (1980, AT)
- Earthsearch (1981*, 10 episodes of 30 mins)
- Earthsearch II (1982*, 10 episodes of 30 mins)
- A Darkening of the Moon (1986, SNT)
- Ice (1986*, SNT), based on Follett's novel.
- Men, Martians and Machines (2003). A three-hour career retrospective for BBC 7 named after the science fiction collection by Eric Frank Russell which had fired Follett's imagination.
- Temple of the Winds (2009, 8 episodes of 20 mins)
- Wicca (2004, 8 episodes of 20 mins)
- Earthsearch Mindwarp (2006, 3 episodes of 45 mins)

An asterisk * after the year means the play has been repeated on BBC7 and/or BBC Radio 4 Extra.

=== Television ===
- Blake's 7 – "Dawn of the Gods" and "Stardrive"
- Knowhow (eighteen "Hyperspace Hotel" segments of BBC series)
- Crown Court (six episodes of Granada TV series)
- The Squad (two episodes for Thames TV series)

=== Other works ===
- Starglider – a science fiction novella accompanying the 1986 computer game of the same name.
- Starglider 2 – a science fiction novella accompanying the 1988 computer game of the same name, a sequel to Starglider.
- Tracker – a science fiction novella accompanying the 1988 computer game of the same name.
- Lost Eden – a science fiction novella accompanying the 1995 computer game of the same name.
