= Edward Wadham =

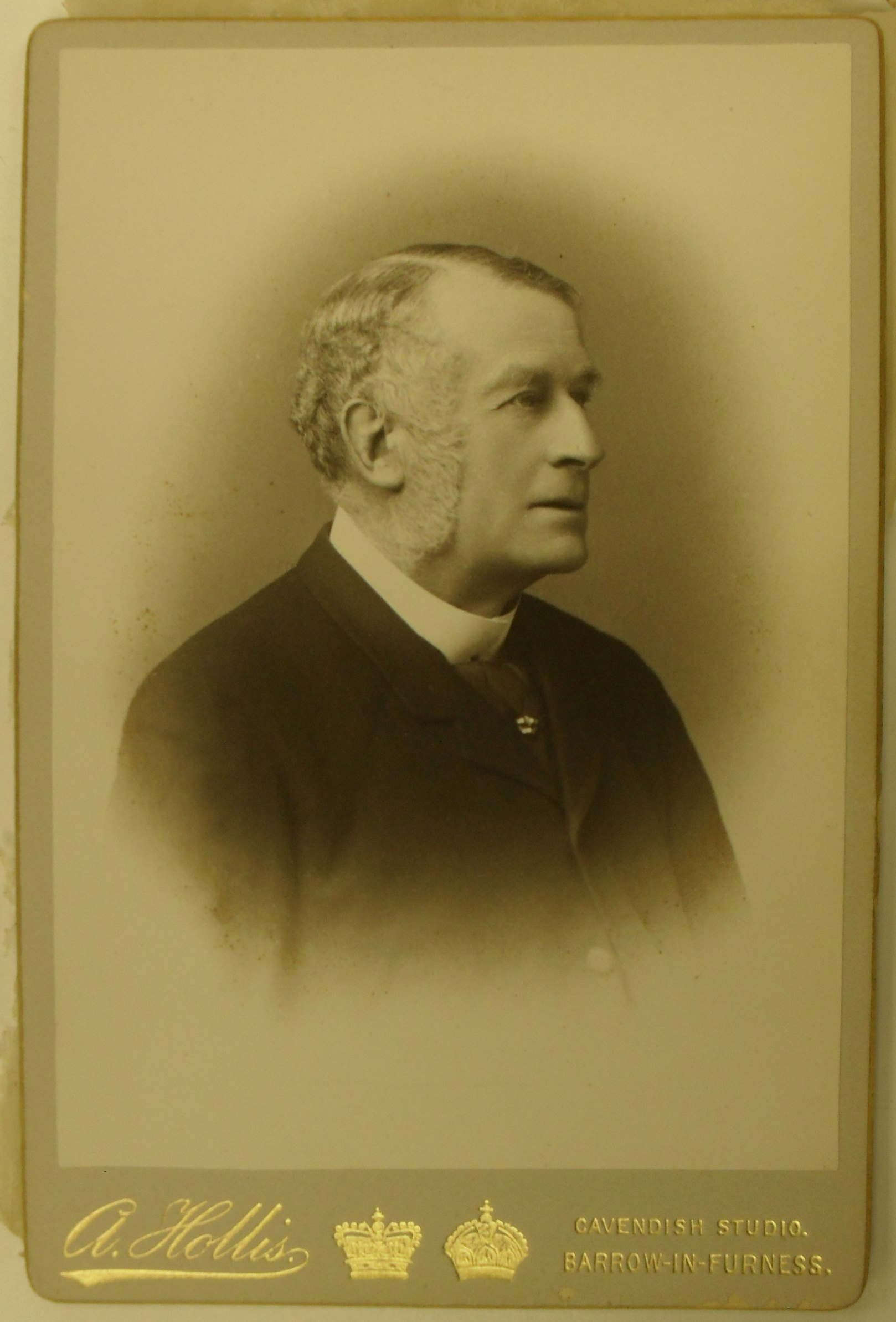
Edward Wadham

Edward Wadham DL JP (22 May 1828 – 1913) was appointed mineral agent to Walter Montagu Douglas Scott, 5th Duke of Buccleuch in 1851 and later, steward of the Manor of Plain Furness. He kept detailed diaries throughout his adult life, now in the possession of the Cumbria Archive Service, many of which cover the growth and development of the town of Barrow-in-Furness, then in Lancashire now in Cumbria, England.

Together with Sir James Ramsden, Henry Schneider and Josiah T. Smith, and as three-times Mayor of Barrow-in-Furness, he did much to open up the iron and steel industries in Barrow, which grew from a tiny nineteenth century hamlet into the biggest iron and steel centre in the world, and a major ship-building force in just forty years.

== Early life ==
Edward Wadham was born in 1828 at Frenchay Manor House, near Bristol, the fifth son of ten children of Thomas and Elizabeth Wadham.

His father Thomas Wadham (1796-1849) attended Wadham College, Oxford, from 1817 to 1819, and was High Sheriff of Bristol in 1843, the same year Isambard Kingdom Brunel completed construction of the SS Great Britain in Bristol Harbour.

His grandfather, John Wadham (1762-1843) of Frenchay Manor House and Bristol Parade, had been from 1789 a director and co-owner with Henry Rickett of the Phoenix Glassworks at Temple Meads in Bristol, known as Wadham Ricketts & Co, which manufactured Bristol blue glass, and in 1820 was a director of the Bristol Floating Harbour Company.

Edward Wadham trained as a civil and mining engineer. His siblings were:

- Thomas Wadham, born 1820 - 1855 Buried at Sighthill Cemetery, Glasgow.
- Rev. John Wadham, 1822 - 1920 MA, Wadham College, Oxford (from 1840 to 1844). Rector of the anglican church of St Mary the Virgin, Weston-on-Trent, Derbyshire for sixty years.
- William Wadham, MD St And., MRCS, FRCP (1870). 1823 - 1897 A bachelor who lived at 99 Park Lane, London W.1 he was a Physician-Surgeon at St George's Hospital, and is buried at St John the Baptist, Frenchay where a stained glass window is erected to his memory.
- James Davison Wadham, 1826-1871 Attorney-at-law, Clerk of the Peace and Under Sheriff of Bristol. Buried at the Anglican Church of St John the Baptist, Frenchay.
- Henry Wadham, 1830 - 1863 Fellow of Corpus Christi College, Oxford. Member of the Inner Temple and a Barrister-at-law, he is buried at Frenchay.
- Elizabeth Wadham 1832 - 1903
- Sarah Wadham, 1833 - 1900
- Rachel Wadham, 1835 - 1856
- George Wadham, 1837 - 1910 London Solicitor at Evans, Wadham & Co, 2 Grays Inn Square, London.

After his schooling, Edward Wadham was apprenticed to John Thornhill Harrison and worked with him under Isambard Kingdom Brunel on the tunnels of the South Devon Railway Company, later part of the Great Western Railway Company, and on the Alston branch of the Newcastle & Carlisle Railway.

== Career ==
Aged twenty-three, Edward Wadham arrived in Ulverston by the "New Times" stagecoach on 1 February 1851 as mineral agent to the Duke of Buccleuch. His first action was to install weighing machines at Dalton-in-Furness railway sidings and Ulverston Canal. The move was not popular with the carters of iron ore.

A significant conversation occurred on 5 April when he asked Mr Cranke, land agent to the Duke, for an advance on his salary. Cranke offered him an easy mining job, which he was unable to accept for fear of Mr Lumley, the Duke's chief steward. Cranke advised him to write for permission, and on 17 April he wrote to Mr Lumley thanking him for his permission to take up any small engineering job that might come his way.

He was soon engaged as mineral agent to William Lowther, 2nd Earl of Lonsdale and surveying the line of tramways for Harrison Ainslie & Co. Mr Cranke was also consulted about his moving into Lindal Mount with William George Ainslie, son of Montague Ainslie of Grizedale New Hall, grandfather to Jack Ainslie, Liberal MP. They shared a house and rented stables together for some years, and Edward Wadham later married William's sister Mary Elizabeth Ainslie.

Wadham remained at Lindal Mount until he moved into Millwood Manor, built for him by the Duke of Buccleuch, in 1862. As a Director of the Furness Railway he later had his own railway siding extended to the bottom of his garden at Millwood Manor. He was elected Associate of the Institution of Civil Engineers on 6 December 1853, and Member of the Institution of Civil Engineers on 17 December 1866, and was connected with the Institution for sixty of his eighty-five years.

In February 1872, following a bad attack of rheumatism, Wadham was certified as unfit to work underground, and the work of surveying the pits passed to his employees.

Positions held:

- Proprietor of the firm of surveyors known at different times as Wadham & Turner, Wadham, Turner & Strongitharm and Wadham & Son.
- Mineral agent from 1851 to 1911 to Walter Montagu Douglas Scott, 5th Duke of Buccleuch (1806-1884), and William Montagu Douglas Scott, 6th Duke of Buccleuch (1831-1914).
- Surveyor to William Cavendish, 7th Duke of Devonshire at Holker Hall.
- Surveyor to George Wyndham, 1st Baron Leconfield of Cockermouth Castle.
- Mineral agent to the William Lowther, 2nd Earl of Lonsdale (1787-1872).
- Mineral agent to Josslyn Pennington, 5th Baron Muncaster (1834-1917).
- Director of Furness Railway from 1885 to 1911
- Director of Richard Thomas & Co and the Lydney Tinplate Co.
- Director of Walney Exploration Co and Vivian Diamond Boring Co and Barrow Salt Co
- Director of Gillfoot Mining Co
- Director of Barrow Steam Cornmill Co until it was wound up in 1884
- Manager of Longlands Mines
- Chairman of North Lonsdale Iron & Steel Co until he resigned in 1899
- Director of Barrow Hematite Steel Company

== Politics ==
Wadham was a staunch member of the Conservative and Unionist party. He served on Barrow council from its inception in 1867 until 1906 and served as Mayor of Barrow-in-Furness for 3 terms from 1878 to 1881.

He was active in the 1885 United Kingdom general election on behalf of his brother-in-law William George Ainslie who was elected as the first Member of Parliament for the new constituency of North Lonsdale, a seat he held until 1892, and of Sir Charles Cayzer in the 1892 United Kingdom general election when he was elected for Barrow-in-Furness, a seat he held until 1906. On 26 April 1904, Wadham was appointed a deputy lieutenant of Lancashire.

== Wife and children ==
He married Mary Elizabeth Ainslie, daughter of Montague Ainslie on 20 September 1860, and at one point owned a steamship called the 'Mary Elizabeth Wadham'. They had 6 children:

- Amy, born in 1861, died in 1944
- Arthur Edward Montague, born 1863, married Marguerite Josephine Bridson (Greta) in 1900, and became County Councillor for Cockermouth. He died in 1925
- Walter Francis Ainslie DL, JP was born in 1865 and joined his father as a civil and mining engineer in 1887. Educated at Charterhouse School and Pembroke College, Cambridge, he continued to live at Millwood Manor, and like his father, was Mineral Agent to the Duke of Buccleuch (from 1913-1945), a Magistrate, and became Mayor of Barrow-in-Furness. He was Colonel of the local regiment, The 4th King's Own (Lancaster) Regiment in World War 1, and died in 1946.
- Dora Louise born 1869, died of influenza in 1918.
- Winifred Mary born 1875, married Lt George Ainslie Rooke RN in February 1907. She died in 1972.
- Gerald Douglas, born 1879, married Edna Elizabeth Bamford in 1910. Died in 1957.

== Other interests ==
Wadham was a lifelong churchman, and active in Church of England politics. As steward of the manor, it was part of his responsibility to liaise with the Lancashire architects Paley and Austin, and he oversaw the building of St Mary's Church, Kirkby Lonsdale, St Peter's Church, Ireleth-in-Furness, St Peter's Church, Lindal-in-Furness and St Mary's Church, Dalton-in-Furness.

Edward Wadham was sworn in as a Magistrate in 1869 and served until 1908. He was vice president of North Lonsdale Agricultural Society in 1869, and also held the posts of president and secretary. He practiced farming on a small scale and Mrs Wadham carried off prizes for honey and for butter. Wadham enjoyed sailing, cricket, hunting (including otter hunting) and fishing, but most particularly shooting. Amongst other places, he shot on Barrow Island and at the estate of Robert Hannay at Ornockenoch.

By his own account he shot rabbit, pheasant, black game, rooks, seagulls, a finger and thumb from his left hand, a coachman and a passer-by.

== Sources ==
- Wadham diaries
- Introduction to the index of the Buccleuch Collection.
