= Daniel Rawlinson =

Daniel Rawlinson (died 1679), of Graythwaite and London, was a vintner in London, where he kept the Mitre Tavern on Fenchurch Street.

== Biography ==
Rawlinson was educated at Hawkshead Grammar School.

He was a friend of Samuel Pepys and is mentioned a number of times in Pepys' diary. According to a letter from Dr. Richard Rawlinson to Tom Herne, an antiquary at Oxford, he seems to have been a staunch royalist: "The Whiggs [sic] tell this, that upon the king's [Charles I] murder, January 30th, 1649, he hung his signe [sic] in mourning".

His wife Margaret died in 1666 of plague and his business burned down in the Great Fire of that year. He later rebuilt the Mitre. His son Thomas Rawlinson became Lord Mayor of London in 1705, and his grandsons include Thomas Rawlinson and Richard Rawlinson, the latter a great benefactor to the Bodleian Library.
