= Hawkshead Market Hall =

Municipal building in Hawkshead, Cumbria, England

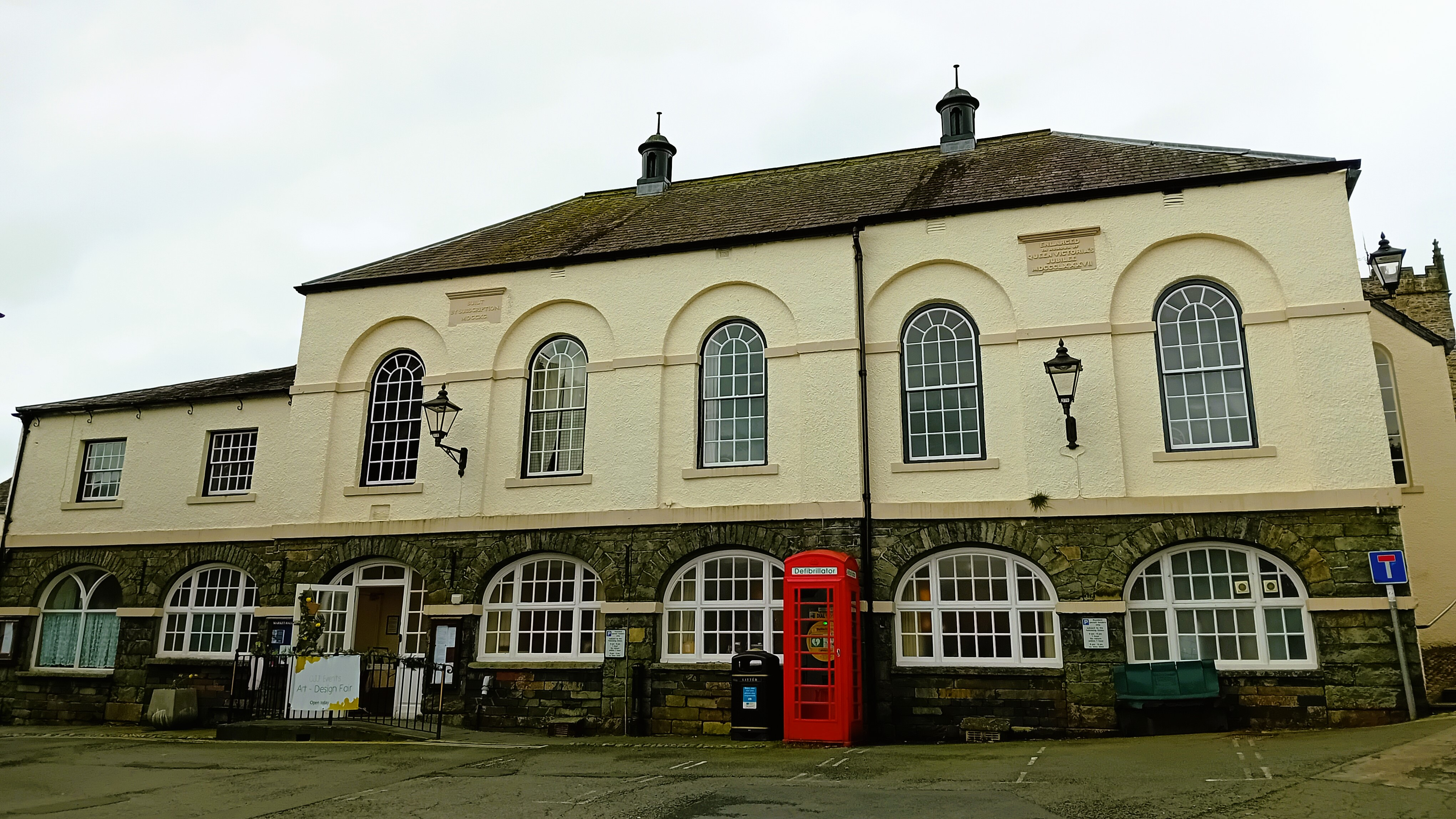
- Hawkshead Market Hall

- Shown in Cumbria
- 54.3744°N 2.9989°W
- Location: The Square, Hawkshead

History
- Built: 1790

Site notes
- Architect: Francis Webster
- Architectural style: Italianate style

Listed Building – Grade II
- Official name: Hawkshead Market Hall and Market Hall Cottage
- Designated: 25 March 1970
- Reference no.: 1121554

Hawkshead Market Hall, also known as Hawkshead Town Hall, is a municipal building in The Square in Hawkshead, Cumbria, England. The building, which is the meeting place of Hawkshead Parish Council, is a Grade II listed building.

== History ==
The first municipal building in Hawkshead was a structure known as the shambles which accommodated a series of butchers' stalls and dated back at least to the early 17th century. By the late 18th century the shambles was dilapidated and the Rector of St Michael and All Angels Church, Reginald Braithwaite, and the headmaster of the local grammar school, Thomas Bowman, launched an initiative to commission a more substantial structure. Braithwaite almost certainly personally contributed to the financing of the structure.

The new building was designed by Francis Webster, under guidance from John Carr, in the Italianate style, built in brick with a whitewash finish and was completed in 1790. The original design involved a symmetrical main frontage with seven bays facing onto The Square; the building was arcaded on the ground floor, so that markets could be held, with an assembly room on the first floor. The central section of three bays, which slightly projected forward and was gabled, was fenestrated by three round headed windows. The outer sections of two bays each, which were shorter than the central section, were fenestrated by rectangular windows.

The poet, William Wordsworth, who disliked whitewashed buildings, referred to the building in his magnum opus, The Prelude, a semi-autobiographical poem about his early years in the local area. He wrote that when he returned to Hawkshead, "a grey stone of native rock…was split and gone to build a smart assembly room that perked and flared".

Petty session hearings were held on a fortnightly basis in the assembly room in the 19th century. As part of the celebrations for the Golden Jubilee of Queen Victoria in 1887, the trustees of the market hall decided to re-model the building: the central gable was removed and the right-hand section was increased in height and re-fenestrated in a similar style to the central section. The left-hand section became the caretaker's cottage and was enhanced by a Venetian window at that end of the structure.

When parish and district councils were established under the Local Government Act 1894, a local parish council was formed in Hawkshead and the market hall subsequently became its meeting place. Following an extensive programme of refurbishment works, which included the installation of new kitchen facilities on the ground floor, the building was re-opened by the comedian, Victoria Wood, as part of the celebrations for the Diamond Jubilee of Elizabeth II in 2012. Works of art in the town hall include a painting by Lucy Kemp-Welch entitled Logging in Grizedale Forest.

== See also ==
- Listed buildings in Hawkshead
