= Hawkshead Grammar School Museum =

Museum in Cumbria, England

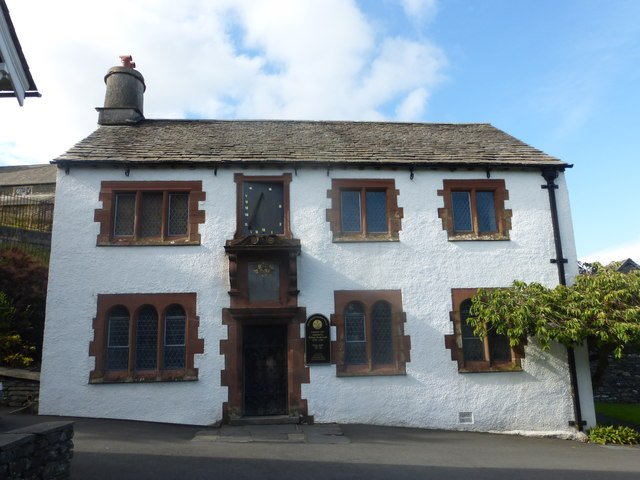
- Front façade of the museum in August 2014

- Location within Cumbria
- Location: Hawkshead, Cumbria, England
- Coordinates: 54.3737°N 2.9984°W
- Type: School museum
- Website: www.hawksheadgrammar.org.uk

The museum operates in the old Hawkshead Grammar School building from 1 April through to 31 October. It gives an introductory talk about the school, highlighting interesting features in the school room and the upstairs exhibition space. Visitors may feel the atmosphere and almost believe they are in a working English schoolroom of 200 years ago where the languages used were Latin and Greek.

Visitors may see the Elizabethan charter from 1585, books from the library collection, original school desks (from 1585 and 1830s) and where William Wordsworth carved his initials into the desk. The museum provides talks to large tour groups and offers a quiz for visitors to complete as they explore the museum. Seasonal special events are offered at the museum.
