= William Larkins Bernard =

William Larkins Bernard (1 October 1843 in Taunton – 22 July 1922) was an English architect, active in Bristol and London member of the FRIBA.

== Career ==
Bernard was apprenticed to Charles Edward Davis, of Bath, Somerset, between 1863 and 1868. Among his own later pupils was Richard Croft James (1872–1949, of Clifton College) who was articled to him at Bristol from 1889 to 1892. Bernard was President of the Bristol Society of Architects in 1898, having previously acted as its honorary secretary, 1888–1890. He is also recorded in 1893 as a Somerset member of the Sanitary Institute. By 1894, he was a Fellow of the Royal Institute of British Architects.

He had an extensive practice as a school architect. In 1889, his offices were at 8, St Stephen's Chambers, Baldwin Street, Bristol, and he was at the same address in 1904.

The firm of W. L. Bernard & Sons of Bristol was still active in the 1930s, after Bernard's death, with offices at 26, Orchard Street.

== Major works ==
- Queen Victoria House, Redland Hill, Bristol, 1886 (built for Waynflete Private School for Boys, later used as Bristol Maternity Hospital, now offices)
- Vestry at St John the Baptist Church, Frenchay, 1887
- Restoration of Buckingham Baptist Chapel, Clifton, 1890
- Fairfield Grammar School, Fairlawn Road, Montpelier, Bristol
