= Montague Ainslie (cricketer) =

English cricketer

Personal information
- Full name: Montague Mordaunt Ainslie
- Born: 8 May 1823; Humeerpore, British India
- Died: 22 March 1896 (aged 72); Windermere, Westmorland, England

Domestic team information
- Years: Team
- 1843–1845: Oxford University

Career statistics
Competition	First-class
Matches	10
Runs scored	98
Batting average	5.44
100s/50s	0/0
Top score	16
Balls bowled	?
Wickets	4
Bowling average	?
5 wickets in innings	0
10 wickets in match	0
Best bowling	3/?
Catches/stumpings	0/–
- Source: ESPNcricinfo, 27 April 2014

Montague Mordaunt Ainslie (8 May 1823 – 22 March 1896) was an English barrister and a cricketer active in the 1840s, making ten appearances in first-class cricket.

== Early life and education ==
Eldest son of Montague Ainslie, sometime of Bengal, and Sophia Mary, daughter of George Poyntz Ricketts, he was born at Humeerpore in British India. His brother William George Ainslie was a businessman and politician.

Ainslie attended Eton College, where he captained the college cricket team, before matriculating at Christ Church, Oxford in 1841; he graduated B.A in 1845. Entering Gray's Inn on 22 November 1845, he was called to the bar on 20 November 1850.

== Legal career ==
Ainslie had a successful career as a barrister; from the 1860s until 1871, he was counsel to the Speaker of the House of Commons, and was examiner of election recognizances.

== Cricket ==
While at Oxford he played first-class cricket for Oxford University, making his debut against the Marylebone Cricket Club (MCC) at Bullingdon Green in 1843. He played first-class cricket for Oxford on seven further occasions up to 1845. He later made two further appearances in first-class matches, playing for the MCC against Oxford University in 1847, before playing for the Gentlemen of Kent against the Gentlemen of England in 1849. A poor batsman of unknown-handedness, Ainslie scored 98 runs in his ten first-class matches, averaging just 5.44. As a bowler it is known he took 4 wickets, however due to incomplete records, it is only known that he took a maximum of 3 in one innings.

== Personal life ==
Ainslie inherited his father's property, Hawkshead, at Grizedale, Ambleside, on the east side of Windermere, Westmorland (the estate, per some accounts, reckoned to be part of Lancashire), where he died on 22 March 1896. He was a Justice of the peace for Lancashire.
