= Hawkshead Hill =

Hamlet in Cumbria, England

Coordinates: 54.379°N 3.021°W

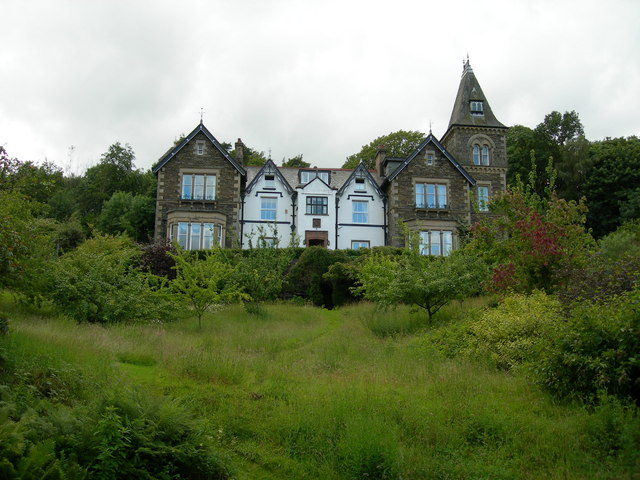
- Yewfield, Hawkshead Hill

- Location in South Lakeland Location within Cumbria
- OS grid reference: SD336986
- Civil parish: Hawkshead
- Unitary authority: Westmorland and Furness
- Ceremonial county: Cumbria
- Region: North West
- Country: England
- Sovereign state: United Kingdom
- Post town: AMBLESIDE
- Postcode district: LA22
- Dialling code: 015394
- Police: Cumbria
- Fire: Cumbria
- Ambulance: North West
- UK Parliament: Westmorland and Lonsdale

Hawkshead Hill is a hamlet in the Westmorland and Furness district, in the county of Cumbria, England. It is in the Lake District National Park.

== Location ==
It is located on the B5285 road about a mile west of the village of Hawkshead and about four miles east of the large village of Coniston. It is a few miles away from Windermere, about 3 miles away from Coniston Water and about 3 miles away from the Old Man of Coniston. Almost directly to the south is Hawkshead Hill Park.

== See also ==
- Listed buildings in Hawkshead
