= Henry Ainslie =

English physician

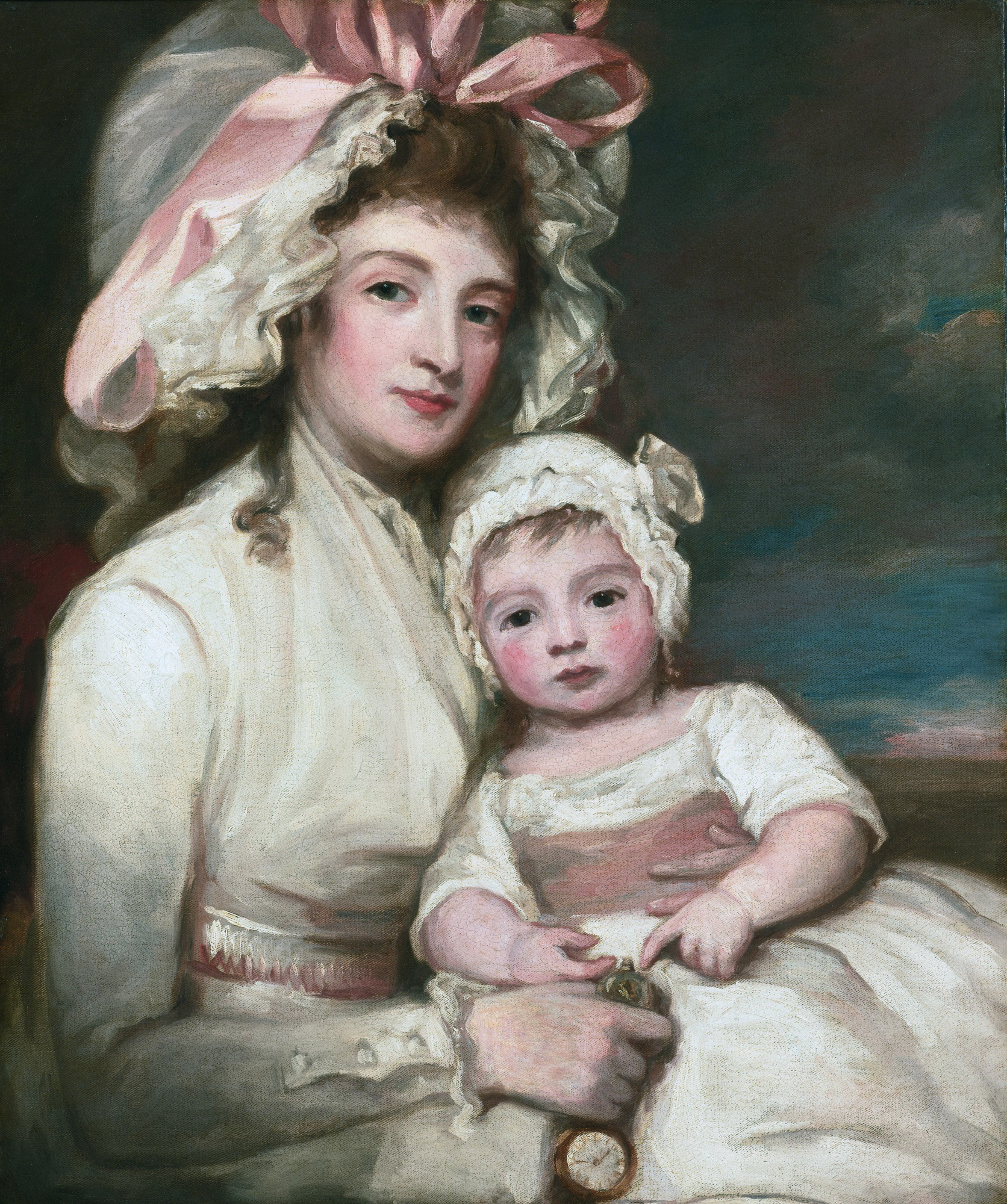
Mrs Henry Ainslie with her child (George Romney)

Henry Ainslie (21 March 1760 – 1834) was a physician. He was the son of the Kendal physician James Ainslie. Educated at Hawkshead Grammar School and then Pembroke College, Cambridge (where he graduated Senior Wrangler and was second in the Smith Prize), he became a fellow of Pembroke in 1782, and a Fellow of the Royal College of Physicians in 1795. He was a Junior Commissioner for Madhouses in 1797 and 1798, and a Senior Commissioner in 1809 and 1817.

In 1785 he married Agnes Ford of Monk Coniston (an estate near Coniston Water in the English Lake District) in the church at Colton. Agnes Ford was the daughter of Richard Ford, founder of the Newland Company, later known as Harrison Ainslie. The couple owned Ford Lodge at Grizedale and planted many thousands of larch trees in the valley and on the surrounding hills and moorland which effectively started Grizedale Forest. They had a son Montague Ainslie.
