= George Haddock (politician) =

George Bahr Haddock (1863 – 22 March 1930) was a British Conservative Party politician who served as the Member of Parliament (MP) for North Lonsdale from 1906 to 1918.

== Career ==
He won the seat at the 1906 general election, defeating by a narrow majority of 2.2% the sitting MP Richard Cavendish, who had been elected as a Liberal Unionist but had joined the Liberal party in 1904.

Haddock was re-elected in January 1910, when his slim majority of 69 votes over the Liberal Joseph Bliss was the subject of an election petition. Bliss's campaign team had asked for recount after the vote was declared, but were told that the ballot boxes had already been sealed and sent by train to London. They lodged a petition, which claimed that invalid votes for Haddock had been allowed while valid votes for Bliss had been disallowed. The court allowed a recount, and Haddock's majority was increased to 169 votes (2.0%).

He was re-elected in December 1910 by an even slimmer majority of 74 votes (1.0%) over Bliss, and held the seat until the North Lonsdale constituency was abolished at the 1918 general election.

Parliament of the United Kingdom
Preceded by Richard Cavendish	Member of Parliament for North Lonsdale; 1906 – 1918	Constituency abolished
