= Listed buildings in Hawkshead =

Hawkshead is a civil parish in Westmorland and Furness, Cumbria, England. It contains 68 listed buildings that are recorded in the National Heritage List for England. Of these, one is listed at Grade I, the highest of the three grades, four are at Grade II*, the middle grade, and the others are at Grade II, the lowest grade. The parish is in the Lake District National Park. It contains the village of Hawkshead, and the smaller settlements of Hawkshead Hill and Outgate, and the surrounding countryside. Most of the listed buildings are in Hawkshead village, and include houses, shops, public houses, churches and associated structures, a former grammar school, a town hall, and a telephone kiosk. Outside the village are more houses, farmhouses, farm buildings, a former mill, bridges, a chapel, an animal pound, a water pump in a shelter, and another telephone kiosk.

== Key ==
Grade	Criteria
I	Buildings of exceptional interest, sometimes considered to be internationally important
II*	Particularly important buildings of more than special interest
II	Buildings of national importance and special interest

== Buildings ==
Name and location	Photograph	Date	Notes	Grade
Hawkshead Courthouse; 54.38046°N 3.00300°W		15th century	Originally the gatehouse to Hawkshead Hall, later used as a courthouse and for other purposes, it is in stone with redsandstone dressings, and has a slate roof with crowstepped gables. There are two storeys and three bays. In the centre is an archway with a segmental-pointed head and a keystone. To the left is a datestone, above the arch are voussoirs, and further to the left is a ventilation slit. Further above the arch is a niche with a corbel, crocketed pinnacles and an arch with a fleuron. To the sides are two-light windows.	II*
St Michael and All Angels Church; 54.37387°N 2.99896°W		Late 15th or early 16th century	The north aisle was rebuilt in 1578, and a vestry was added in about 1793. The church is built in stone with a slate roof, and consists of a nave and chancel in a single cell, a clerestory, a south porch, chapels, a northwest vestry, and a west tower. The tower has a doorway with a pointed head, a chamfered and mullioned window above, a clock face on the south front, a top cornice, and an embattled parapet with corner pinnacles.	I
Barn, Field Head Farm; 54.38965°N 3.00762°W	—	16th or 17th century (possible)	A stone barn with a slate roof and five bays. There is a barn entrance on the south side, and on the north side is a smaller barn entrance, and two other entrances, one blocked. Inside the barn are cruck trusses.	II
Garage, Hawkshead Fields; 54.36290°N 2.99675°W		Late 16th or early 17th century	Originally a house, then a stable, and later a garage, it is in stone with a slate roof. It has two storeys, and a southwest wing with quoins. It contains garage doors, and has blocked doorways and windows. Inside there is a full cruck truss.	II
Barn, Sawrey Ground Farm; 54.38304°N 3.02472°W	—	16th or 17th century (probable)	A barn and cow house in stone with slate roofs and in an L-shaped plan. The barn has four bays, and inside are cruck trusses. In the cow house are two entrances, ventilation slits, and a pitching hole.	II
Sawrey Ground Farmhouse; 54.38327°N 3.02479°W	—	1623	The farmhouse was rebuilt in 1901. It is in roughcast stone with a slate roof. There are two storeys, three bays, and a single-storey two-bay wing to the southeast. The windows are casements, there is a fire window, and above the ground floor windows is a hood mould. There are two porches, one gabled with a datestone above, and one a lean-to.	II
Anne Tyson's Cottage; 54.37494°N 2.99954°W		17th century (probable)	A roughcast house with a slate roof, two storeys and five bays projecting forward as gabled wings. The windows in the ground floor are sashes, and in the upper floor they are casements. To the left steps lead up to a first floor terrace supported by a round stone pier. On the front is a trellised porch.	II*
Black Beck Lodge; 54.37625°N 2.99731°W		17th century (possible)	The house was altered and extended in the 19th century. It is roughcast with a slate roof, two storeys and six bays, the first two bays converted from a slaughter house. Most of the windows are sashes, some are fixed, and there are canted bay windows in the sixth bay and the right return. The porch is gabled and has an elliptical arch, and side lights with pointed heads containing stained and etched glass.	II
Brown Cow Cottages and Laithe; 54.37461°N 2.99843°W		17th century (probable)	A group of cottages on a corner site, they are roughcast with a slate roof. There are two storeys, five bays facing Main Street, and five bays facing Victoria Street. The windows are varied; some are casements, some are fixed, and some are mullioned - one of these also has a transom. The first two bays in Victoria Street are gabled and in the fourth bay is a doorway with a segmental head.	II
Cruck barn, Esthwaite Hall; 54.35454°N 2.99031°W	—	17th century	The barn was extended in the 18th century by the addition of another range at right angles. The barn is on a foundation of massive boulders, it is in local stone, with quoins and a Westmorland slate roof, and it has a single storey. The older part has five bays, it contains a double doorway and a single doorway, and inside there are four cruck trusses. The later part has six bays, and it contains a double doorway.	II
Hawkshead Fields House and Cottage; 54.36317°N 2.99649°W		17th century	Two roughcast stone houses with a slate roof, to which a rear wing was added in the late 17th or early 18th century. They have two storeys, four bays, and a rear wing. There are porches on the front and in the right return, and the windows are a mix of casements and sashes.	II
Hawkshead Old Hall; 54.38038°N 3.00341°W	—	17th century (possible)	A roughcast house with slate roofs, two storeys, and an east front of three bays. The first bay projects forward, it is gabled and contains a casement window. The second bay projects slightly and contains a mullioned and transomed stair window, and the third bay has a mullioned window and a lean-to porch. At the rear are four bays, most windows are casements, and there is one mullioned window. In the right return are sash windows.	II*
King's Arms Public House; 54.37476°N 2.99911°W		17th century	The public house is roughcast with a slate roof, two storeys and five bays. The outer bays project forward, the upper floor is extended to the right over a passage, and there is a gabled wing at the rear. In the centre is a doorway with a gabled slate canopy. The windows are mainly a mix of sashes and casements, and in the rear wing are mullioned windows.	II
Minstrels' Gallery; 54.37480°N 2.99933°W		17th century	A roughcast shop with a slate roof, two storeys and a front of four bays, the fourth bay recessed. There is an open gabled porch, and the windows on the front are a mix of casements and sashes. In the right return and at part of the rear the upper floor is jettied. There are five bays at the rear, which include a stone staircase, a stair window, and some weatherboarding.	II
Red Lion Hotel; 54.37516°N 2.99885°W		17th century (possible)	The public house was refaced in the 19th century. It is stuccoed and has a slate roof. There are two storeys and an attic, three bays, and a single-storey extension to the left. In the eaves are two carved corbels, and above the central doorway is a hood mould. Most of the windows are sashes, and in the roof are three gabled dormers. In the left return are ornamental bargeboards.	II
Roger Ground House; 54.36942°N 3.00031°W		17th century	The oldest part is the rear wing, the main range dating from the 18th century. The house is in roughcast stone with a slate roof, and has two storeys, a front of two bays with a lean-to outshut to the right, and a two-bay rear wing. On the front is a gabled trellised porch, sash windows, and at the top is a corbelled frieze and wide eaves. In the rear wing, some windows are mullioned and transomed, and others are casements.	II
Former Solicitor's office 54.37506°N 2.99875°W		17th century (probable)	The building was refaced in the 19th century. It is stuccoed, with quoins, a top frieze, and deep bracketed eaves. The building has a slate roof, two storeys and three bays, the first bay containing a through passage. In the second bay is a canted bay window, and to the right is a doorway in an architrave and a sash window. In the upper floor the third bay contains a Venetian window, there are sash windows in the other bays, and all have hood moulds. At the rear is a horizontally-sliding sash window and mullioned windows.	II
Thimble Hall; 54.37479°N 2.99870°W		17th century	The ground floor is in stone, the upper floor is roughcast, and the roof is slated. There are two storeys with an attic, and two bays; the upper floor is jettied. In the ground floor is a shop front, a doorway and two windows, one of which is mullioned. In the upper floor is a mullioned and transomed window, and in the right return is a sash window. The gable contains gabled tile-hung dormers containing casement.	II
Hawkshead Grammar School; 54.37374°N 2.99841°W		1675	The entrance to the grammar school were rebuilt in 1888 and the windows in 1891, and the building has since been used as a museum. It is roughcast with ashlar dressings, a slate roof, two storeys and three bays. The windows are mullioned, those in the ground floor having lights with round heads. The entrance has an architrave and a dated pulvinated frieze. Over the doorway is a plaque containing an armorial bearing and an inscription, above which is a cornice with a pediment and crests carried on scrolled consoles. At the top is a sundial in an architrave.	II*
Baptist Chapel and house 54.37979°N 3.02076°W		1678	The Baptist chapel was restored in 1878. It is roughcast with a slate roof, and has three bays and a small rear wing. The windows have pointed heads with Y-tracery, and a porch to the right with a casement window. The house to the left has two storey and two bays, a slate-slab porch, and windows with segmental heads, one window in the ground floor is a casement window and above are sash windows.	II
Sundial; 54.37427°N 2.99889°W	—	1693	The sundial is in the churchyard of St Michael and All Angels Church. It is in stone, and consists of a chamfered base on a square steps, a chamfered shaft and a moulded cap with a metal plate. There is no gnomon.	II
Ben Fold; 54.38917°N 3.00675°W	—	17th or early 18th century	A roughcast house with a slate roof, built on sloping ground, with two bays, and one storey at the north end and two at the south. The entrance is at the north end, above which is a hood mould, and the windows are casements. Inside the north bay is a cruck truss.	II
Chapel Cottage and 1 Flag Street; 54.37468°N 2.99946°W		17th or early 18th century	A pair of houses, roughcast with a slate roof, two storeys and five bays. The first bay projects forwards, and the second, fourth and fifth bays have jettied upper floors. Most of the windows are fixed with opening lights and there are some casement windows. In the right return is a two-storey canted bay window with a hipped roof.	II
Jessamine Cottage and The Old Loft; 54.37964°N 3.02083°W	—	17th or 18th century (possible)	A pair of roughcast stone houses with a slate roof, two storeys and seven bays. Above the first bay is a small gable, the fifth bay is recessed and has a larger gable, and the sixth and seventh bays are further recessed. Most of the windows are casements; there are sash windows in the first bay, and a mullioned window in the fifth bay.	II
Little Force Cottage and outbuilding 54.37455°N 3.00034°W	—	Late 17th or early 18th century (probable)	The house and outbuilding are in stone with a slate roof. The house is roughcast, and has two storeys and three bays. The windows are sashes, above the doorway is a hood mould, and at the rear is an entrance with a gabled slate canopy. In the outbuilding are garage doors with a slate lintel.	II
Pillar Cottage; 54.37425°N 2.99946°W		17th or early 18th century	A roughcast house with some slate hanging and a slate roof. There are two storeys, two bays, and a rear wing with a porch in the angle. The upper floor is jettied and carried on a stone pier and an iron column. Steps lead up to a doorway in the upper floor. In the ground floor the windows are casements, and in the upper floor is a sash window and a fixed window.	II
Queen's Head Public House; 54.37474°N 2.99849°W		17th or early 18th century (possible)	The public house is roughcast, the front is stuccoed and painted to resemble timber framing, and the roof is slated. There are two storeys and three bays, and most of the windows are sashes.	II
The Old Cottage; 54.38938°N 2.99445°W	—	Late 17th or 18th century	A roughcast stone house with a slate roof, two storeys, three bays, and a rear wing. On the front is a gabled porch. Some windows are mullioned, and others are casements or fixed.	II
Walker Ground Cottage; 54.37390°N 3.00391°W		17th or early 18th century (probable)	A stone house with a slate roof, two storeys and two bays. The upper floor windows are in gabled dormers, and most windows are casements. At the right end the roof is hipped with a gablet containing a mullioned window. Inside there is an upper cruck truss.	II
Wayside Cottage and adjoining buildings 54.37968°N 3.02051°W		17th or early 18th century	This consists of a pair of houses and adjoining outbuildings. The houses are roughcast with slate roofs, two storeys and five bays, the right two bays lower. There is a gabled porch in the second bay, a recessed doorway in the fifth bay, and the windows are casements. To the right, the outbuilding is in stone with a Welsh slate roof. It contains a large entrance, two smaller entrances, and a square opening.	II
Wild Goose and barn 54.36751°N 3.00048°W	—	17th or early 18th century (probable)	The house and barn are in stone and the house is roughcast with two storeys and four bays. On the front are casement windows, and a doorway with a gabled slate hood, and at the rear is a stair wing and a mullioned window. The barn to the right has inserted garage doors and a gabled wing with a pitching hole.	II
Information Centre and Bend or Bump; 54.37491°N 2.99865°W		Early 18th century	A shop and a house, roughcast with a slate roof, it has two storeys and four bays. The first bay projects forward and is gabled, and is jettied on two sides. It contains a mix of casement and sash window, and a shop entrance. The house to the right has a trellised porch with a gabled slate hood, and at the rear is a horizontally-sliding ash window.	II
Rock Cottage; 54.39041°N 2.99512°W	—	Early 18th century (probable)	A roughcast stone house with two storeys and two bays. On the front is a slate hood mould and a gabled porch. There is one sash window, and the others are casements.	II
Wordsworth House; 54.37433°N 2.99938°W		Early 18th century	A roughcast house with a slate roof, two storeys and two bays. The windows in the first bay are casements, in the second bay they are sashes, and the central timber porch is gabled.	II
Co-operative Store; 54.37491°N 2.99887°W	—	1732	A roughcast shop with a slate roof, two storeys and three bays. In the ground floor are three shop windows, the windows in the upper floor are sashes, and on the sides they are casements. Above the entrance is a gabled canopy containing a datestone.	II
Former bank, house and surgery 54.37507°N 2.99903°W		18th century	The building is roughcast with a slate roof, two storeys and five bays, the first bay lower and recessed. In the ground floor, the first bay contains casement windows, the second bay has a shop window and entrance, in the third and fourth bays are a window with an entablature, and a doorway with pilasters and a round-headed pediment containing a cartouche. In the fifth bay and the upper floor are sash windows, and at the rear is a horizontally-sliding sash window.	II
Fold Cottage, Moss Beck, Rose Lea, Barn End and barns 54.39052°N 2.99465°W	—	18th century (probable)	A row of four houses with outbuildings, they are roughcast with a slate roof. There are two storeys and a front of eight bays. Most of the windows are casements, and three of the houses have gabled slate canopies with trellised sides. A the rear are two outbuildings.	II
Grandy Nook; 54.37478°N 2.99966°W		18th century	A shop and house, roughcast with a slate roof, two storeys and two bays, and a gabled porch on the front. The right return has three bays, the first gabled, and two single-bay additions to the right. Some of the windows are fixed, but most are casements.	II
Ivy House Hotel; 54.37527°N 2.99927°W	—	18th century	The hotel is roughcast with a hipped slate roof, two storeys, and a symmetrical three-bay front. The central doorway is round-headed in a recess, and has imposts, panelled pilasters, and a fanlight. The windows are sashes.	II
Old Post Office; 54.39024°N 2.99512°W	—	18th century (probable)	A roughcast stone house with a slate roof, two storeys, three bays, and a single-storey bay to the right. There is a gabled porch, and most of the windows on the front are casements with small panes. At the rear is a mullioned window.	II
Village pound 54.38957°N 2.99467°W		18th century or earlier (possible)	The former pound is a roughly rectangular stone enclosure with concrete coping and iron railings. The wall facing the street is about 13.5 metres (44 ft) long.	II
The Corner Shop; 54.37472°N 2.99867°W	—	18th century	A roughcast shop with a slate roof, three storeys and three bays, the right bay being lower. In the ground floor is a shop door and window, the latter with thick chamfered mullions and transoms, and to the right is a casement window. Most of the windows in the upper floors are sash windows.	II
Laburnum House; 54.37461°N 2.99885°W		18th century	A stone shop, roughcast at the front, with quoins at the rear, and a slate roof, partly hipped. There are three storeys, and a front of two bays. The windows in the front are sashes, and in the left return is a doorway with a fanlight. The rear is gabled, most windows are fixed with opening lights, and there is a casement window in the attic.	II
Annexe, Red Lion Hotel; 54.37514°N 2.99857°W		18th century (probable)	A roughcast house with a slate roof, two storeys and two bays. The windows are casements, and there is a stair window.	II
Sun Cottage and Sun Inn public house 54.37408°N 2.99844°W		18th century (probable)	The building is roughcast with slate roofs and some exposed stone. It has a U-shaped plan, consisting of a main rain with three storeys and six bays, a projecting two-storey wing to the left, and a projecting three-storey wing to the right. In the ground floor the first bay of the main range are casement windows with slate-hung lintels, in the second bay is a bay window, canted to one end, the fourth and fifth bays contain casement windows, and in the sixth bay is a shop window. In the middle floor is a mix of casement and sash windows, and the top floor contains mullioned windows.	II
Belmount Hotel and outbuilding 54.38509°N 2.99918°W	—	1774	Originally a country house, later a hotel, in stone, partly pebbledashed, with a hipped slate roof. The main part has three storeys and five bays, with a base, a band, and a top frieze and cornice. There is a two-story two-bay wing to the left, a similar, but ruined, wing to the right, and a rear stair wing. In the centre is a Tuscan porch with a pediment, and most of the windows are sashes. On the right are former farm buildings.	II
Wee Cottage; 54.37459°N 3.00025°W	—	Mid- to late 18th century (probable)	A roughcast stone house with slate hanging and a slate roof, it has three storeys, one bay, and a two-story rear outshut. In the ground floor is a through passage on the left, and steps leading up to a first floor doorway on the right. The window in the middle floor is a top-hung casement, and in the top floor it is fixed, with an opening light.	II
Bank Cottage and Relish; 54.37470°N 2.99886°W		Late 18th century	A shop and a house in roughcast stone with a slate roof. There are three storeys and a front of four bays. The building contains two doorways, and the windows vary; some are casements, some are sashes, and in the top floor are horizontally-sliding sashes.	II
Footbridge north of former Bobbin Mill; 54.38108°N 3.01632°W	—	Late 18th century	The footbridge crosses a stream and consists of a stone pier supporting large flagstones.	II
Former Bobbin Mill; 54.38097°N 3.01605°W	—	1786	A water mill, initially a flax mill, then a bobbin mill, and subsequently a private house. It is in stone, partly roughcast, and has a slate roof. The mill is built on a steeply sloping site, with one storey to the south and four storeys to the north, and a single-storey gabled wing containing the waterwheel. Most of the windows are casements. The waterwheel is in cast and wrought iron, and has a diameter of about 9 metres (30 ft).	II
Town Hall and cottage 54.37436°N 2.99899°W		1790	The town hall was extended by the addition of two bays to the right in 1887. It has a ground floor in slate, a roughcast upper floor, and a slate roof. There are two storeys and seven bays, the first two bays lower and recessed, forming a house, and the right two bays slightly recessed. In the ground floor are elliptical-headed arches, now infilled, and a doorway. In the upper floor are sash windows, in the first two bays they have square heads, and elsewhere they have round heads in round-headed recesses. On the front are two datestones, and in the upper floor of the left return is a Venetian window.	II
Fern Cottage; 54.37454°N 2.99974°W	—	18th or early 19th century	The house is in plastered stone, exposed at the rear, and with a slate roof. There are two storeys and three bays. On the front is a trellised porch, a separate doorway with a fanlight, and a loading door in the upper floor. The windows are casements.	II
Gilmarver House, Gilmarver Flat and Lile Teashop; 54.37518°N 2.99910°W		18th or early 19th century	Two houses and a shop, roughcast with a slate roof, and with two storeys. The houses face Wordsworth Street, and have two bays each. In the ground floor are a garage door and two doorways, one with a gables canopy and a fanlight. The front on Main Street has three bays, the first gabled, and it contains a shop window and entrance. The windows are a mix of casements and sashes.	II
The Honeypot, Flag Cottage, Rose Cottage and cottage to west 54.37459°N 2.99937°W		18th or early 19th century	A shop, with three houses behind, mainly plastered with some pebbledashing, they have a slate roof and two storeys. The Honeypot at the end, is gabled with two bays, and contains a doorway and two shop windows in the ground floor and casement windows above. Behind, the houses have a total of six bays, one with a jettied upper floor, and with porches and a mix of casement and sash windows.	II
Jasmine Cottage; 54.37466°N 3.00001°W	—	18th or early 19th century	Two stone houses with a slate roof, two storeys with basements, two bays each, and a rear wing. The left house is roughcast, it has a projection in the left bay containing a doorway on the side, and the windows are casements. The right house has a central doorway with a canopy, and fixed windows with opening lights. Both houses have fanlights above the doors.	II
Jessamine Cottage and Rose Cottage; 54.37521°N 2.99843°W		18th or early 19th century	A pair of roughcast houses with a slate roof and two storeys. Each house has two bays, and each has a gabled trellised porch. Most of the windows are sashes. Above the door of Jassamine Cottage, the house on the left, is a fanlight, and to the right of the doorway is an entry.	II
Methodist Church; 54.37475°N 2.99947°W		18th or early 19th century	The church, with its entrance in a corner of The Square, was converted from a house in 1862. On the entrance front is a porch with a segmental head and a round opening, and to the right is a round-headed window. Elsewhere are square-headed windows.	II
Rose Castle; 54.38979°N 3.02670°W		Late 18th or 19th century (possible)	The house is built in slate with large quoins, partly roughcast, with a slate roof. There are two storeys, two bays, end pilaster buttresses, crow-stepped gables and a small rear outshut. The windows have pointed heads with casements, and the porch is open and gabled.	II
Tarragon and house 54.37493°N 2.99922°W	—	18th or early 19th century	A house and a shop, roughcast with a slate roof and two storeys. The house, on the left, has two bays, each with a small gable, and the shop has one bay with a larger gable. The windows are sashes, the doorway to the house has a gabled surround, and in the ground floor of the shop is a shop window with a cornice and a frieze.	II
Esthwaite Lodge; 54.36168°N 2.99472°W		1819–21	A country house built for Thomas Alcock Beck and attributed to Francis and George Webster, later used as a youth hostel. It is stuccoed with hipped slate roofs, and has two storeys, sides of three bays, and a gabled rear range. On the entrance front is a Doric porch and a door with a fanlight. In the left return is a canted bay window and a French window. The garden front has a timber trellis verandah with segmental and round arches. Most of the windows are sashes.	II
Former bank and house 54.37447°N 2.99926°W		Early 19th century	The former bank and attached house are roughcast with a slate roof and some slate hanging. There are two storeys and six bays. In the ground floor is a shop window and entrance, the doorway with flat pilasters, a frieze, and a cornice. The doorway to the house has an architrave, a frieze, and a pediment, and the windows are sashes.	II
Lantern Cottage and Ross Cottage; 54.37450°N 2.99950°W		Early 19th century (probable)	A pair of roughcast houses with a slate roof, two storeys with attics, and two bays in each house. The windows are sashes, and in the attics are gabled dormers. In the third bay is a doorway with panelled pilasters, an entablature, and an open pediment, and above the door is a blocked elliptical fanlight.	II
Old School House; 54.37319°N 2.99793°W	—	Early 19th century	A roughcast house with a slate roof, two storeys, four bays, and a rear wing. The windows in the front are sashes, and in the rear wing they are casements. The doorway has engaged Tuscan columns, and a porch with an entablature and a segmental pediment.	II
Helm Lea and Barn Syke; 54.37546°N 2.99939°W	—	Early to mid-19th century	A pair of roughcast houses with a slate roof and two storeys. Each house has three bays and a central trellised and gabled porch. The windows are sashes.	II
Water pump and shelter, Outgate Inn; 54.38973°N 2.99457°W	—	19th century (probable)	Opposite Outgate Inn is an open slate shelter with a single pitched roof. It contains an iron pump is a wooden case.	II
Bridge near Low Wray Farm; 54.40286°N 2.96874°W	—	Mid- to late 19th century	A stone bridge crossing the Bielham Beck, it consists of a round arch formed by voussoirs. There are two fluted iron piers at the summit, but no parapets or abutments.	II
War memorial 54.37426°N 2.99879°W		1920	The memorial is in the churchyard of St Michael and All Angels Church, and is based on the Gosforth Cross. It was designed by W. G. Collingwood and sculpted by his daughter, Barbara. The memorial is in sandstone, and consists of a Celtic-style wheel-head cross on a tapering shaft with a rectangular base of three steps. On the cross is a central boss and interlace carving. There is more interlace carving on the front and back of the shaft, on the front incorporating Saint George and the Dragon. There are also inscriptions on both sides, with the names of those lost in the First World War on the front, and those lost in the Second World War on the back.	II
Telephone kiosk, Hawkshead; 54.37441°N 2.99902°W		1935	A K6 type telephone kiosk standing in The Square in front of the Town Hall, it was designed by Giles Gilbert Scott. Constructed in cast iron with a square plan and a dome, it has three unperforated crowns in the top panels.	II
Telephone kiosk, Outgate; 54.39034°N 2.99497°W	—	1935	A K6 type telephone kiosk designed by Giles Gilbert Scott. It is constructed in cast iron with a square plan and a dome, and has three unperforated crowns in the top panels.	II
