= William Smith (1849–1913) =

British Liberal Party politician

William Smith (1849 – 30 October 1913) was a British Liberal Party politician who served as the Member of Parliament (MP) for North Lonsdale from 1892 to 1895.

He won the seat at the 1892 general election, but did not stand again at the 1895 general election.

He was Chairman of the Federation of Tenant Farmers' Clubs.

Parliament of the United Kingdom
Preceded by William George Ainslie	Member of Parliament for North Lonsdale; 1892 – 1895	Succeeded by Richard Cavendish
