= Hawkshead Grammar School =

Grammar school in Hawkshead, Cumbria, England

Coordinates: 54.3737°N 2.9985°W

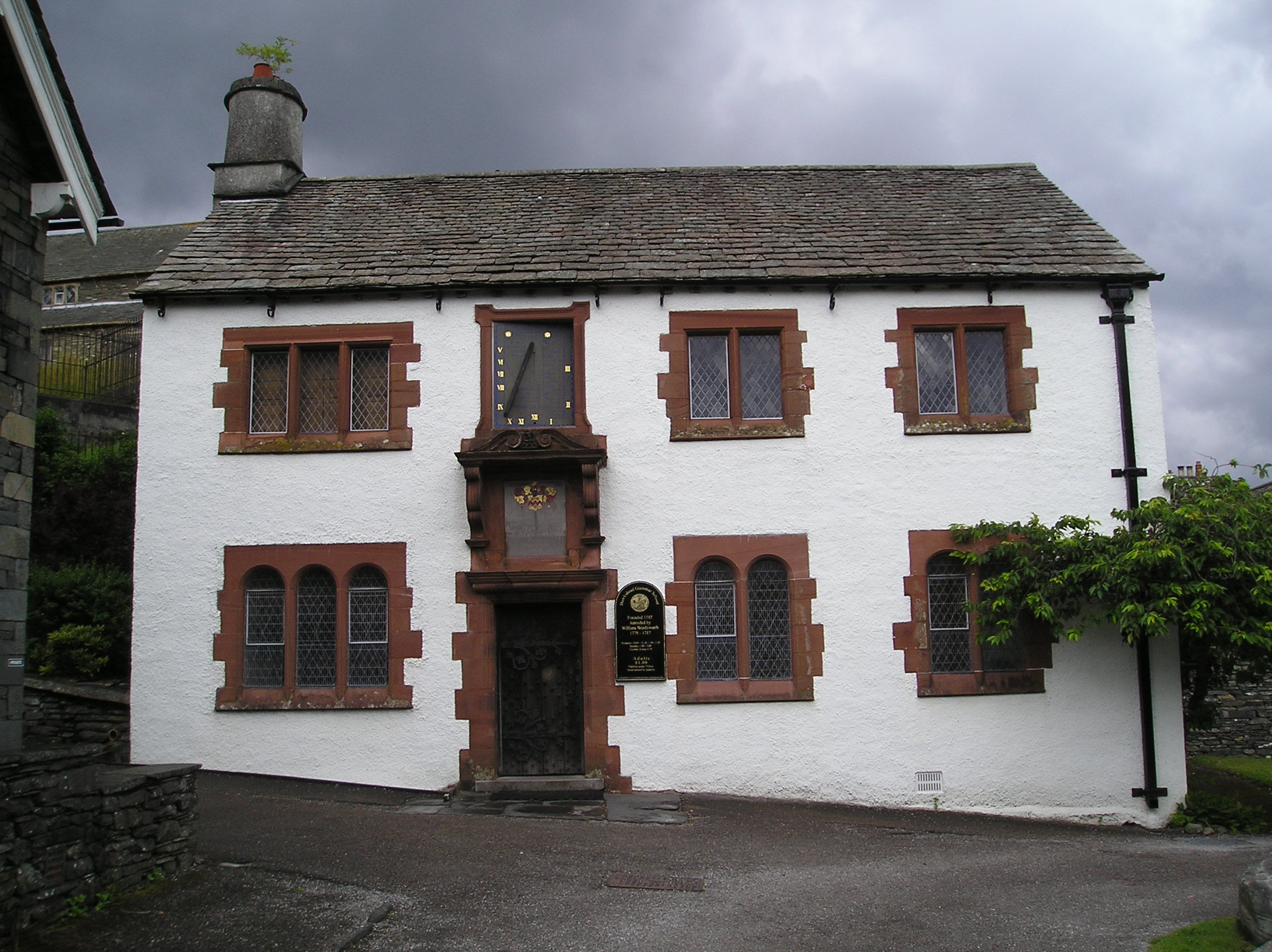
Hawkshead Grammar School

Hawkshead Grammar School in Hawkshead, Cumbria, England was founded in 1585 by Archbishop Edwin Sandys, the incumbent Archbishop of York, whose family came from the Hawkshead area. He petitioned Queen Elizabeth I for a charter to set up the school and endowed it will sufficient land and property for the education to be free, and for many years it was known as 'The Free Grammar School of Hawkshead'. The early School taught Latin, Greek and sciences, including arithmetic and geometry. At its peak in 1750-1800, it had a very good reputation for teaching Maths and getting boys into Cambridge, and attracted pupils from across the North of England and southern Scotland. Although the School closed in 1909, the building functions today as Hawkshead Grammar School Museum and is open to the public.

The building is Grade II* listed.

== Notable former pupils and teachers ==
Scholars included:

- Poet William Wordsworth
- Christopher Wordsworth (Trinity)
- Reverend George Walker (a sixteenth-century divine and one of the Westminster Assembly)
- Joshua King
- Sir James Scarlett, 1st Baron Abinger
- Sir Frederick Pollock, 3rd Baronet
- Bishop Law
- Daniel Rawlinson
- Thomas Alcock Beck
- Henry Ainslie
- Montague Ainslie
- Lord Brougham
- Edward Baines
- William Pearson (Astronomer)
- Edward Christian
- Thomas Young (writer and theologian)

== See also ==
- List of English and Welsh endowed schools (19th century)
- Grade II* listed buildings in Westmorland and Furness
- Listed buildings in Hawkshead
