= Thomas Rawlinson (1647–1708) =

English merchant

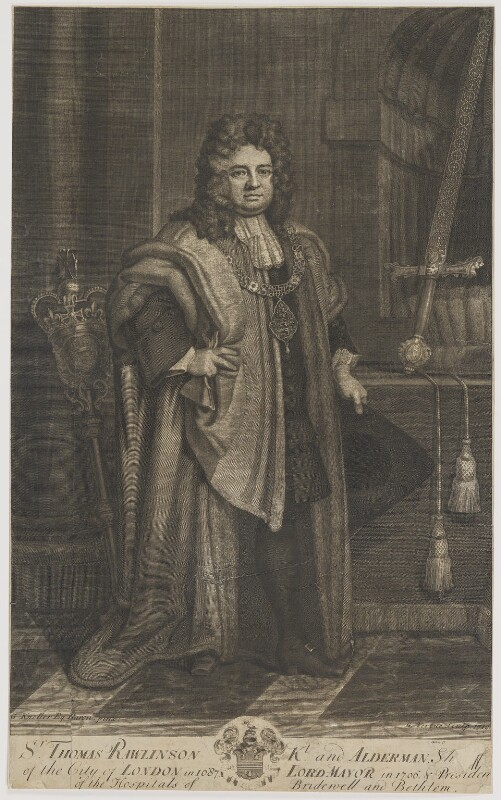
Sir Thomas Rawlinson, engraving after Godfrey Kneller

Sir Thomas Rawlinson (1647 – 1708) was an English merchant who served as the Lord Mayor of London in 1705. He became president of Bridewell and Bethlehem Hospitals.

== Biography ==
Rawlinson was the son of Daniel Rawlinson and his wife Margaret. He was born in the parish of St. Dionis Backchurch, London, and was baptised on 1 April 1647. His father was a London vintner, who kept the Mitre tavern in Fenchurch Street, and owned land at Graysdale, Lancashire, where the family came from. Rawlinson followed his father into business as a vintner. He married Mary Taylor, eldest daughter of Richard Taylor, of Turnham Green, who kept the Devil tavern by the Temple.

Rawlinson was admitted a freeman of the Vintners' Company on 12 October 1670, and was elected master in 1687 and in 1696. The company possess a silver-gilt standing cup and cover presented to them by Rawlinson in 1687. On 6 August 1686 he was knighted at Windsor, and in the following month was appointed by the king, with Sir Thomas Fowles, Sheriff of London and Middlesex (Luttrell, Relation of State Affairs, i. 385). He was elected alderman of the ward of Castle Baynard on 1 December 1696, and was appointed colonel of the trained bands in July 1690, and colonel of the White regiment on 21 June 1705. On 22 September 1705 he became president of Bridewell and Bethlehem Hospitals, and on Michaelmas Day following was chosen lord mayor. During his mayoralty the city celebrated Marlborough's victories in Flanders during the War of the Spanish Succession. At Rawlinson's request the Queen presented the trophies and colours taken at Ramillies and other engagements to the city, to be hung in the Guildhall.

Rawlinson died in November 1708 at his house in the Old Bailey, and was buried on 18 November in the church of St. Dionis, in the tomb of his father. By his wife, Rawlinson had fifteen children including sons Thomas Rawlinson and Richard Rawlinson. A portrait of Rawlinson is in the court room at Vintners' Hall. His will, dated 20 January 1700, with a codicil of 28 July 1707 (Lane, 44), mentions the manor of Wasperton in Warwickshire, and his ancestral property in Graysdale [Grizedale, Cumbria]. His wife was buried in St. Dionis Church on 1 March 1725.

Civic offices
Preceded by Sir Owen Buckingham	Lord Mayor of London; 1705– 1706	Succeeded by Sir Robert Bedingfeld
