= Norman Frederick Frome =

English ornithologist (1899–1982)

Sir Norman Frederick Frome CIE, DFC (23 September 1899 – 28 November 1982) was an English ornithologist.

Frome was born in Aldershot, and was educated at Fairfield Grammar School and at the University of Bristol.

Frome worked in India after joining the Indian Posts and Telegraphs Department in 1923 after serving in the RAF. In 1937 he became Director of Telegraphs and in 1941 Postmaster General. During this time he made studies on the birds of various parts of India. These studies are the oldest and most comprehensive studies of the birds of the Delhi region. He wrote extensively in the Journal of the Bombay Natural History Society. He was also interested in astronomy, member of the British Astronomical Association from 28 November 1962 until his death.

== Publications ==
- Frome, N F (1946): Birds noted in the Mahasu-Narkanda-Baghi area of the Simla Hills. JBNHS. 46(2):308-316.
- Frome, N F (1947): The birds of Delhi and District. JBNHS. 47(2):277-300.
- Frome, N F (1948): The birds of Delhi and District. JBNHS. 47(4):751-753.
- Frome, N F (1945): A note on birds of the Simla foothills. JBNHS. 45(3):422-425.
