= Fairfield Grammar School =

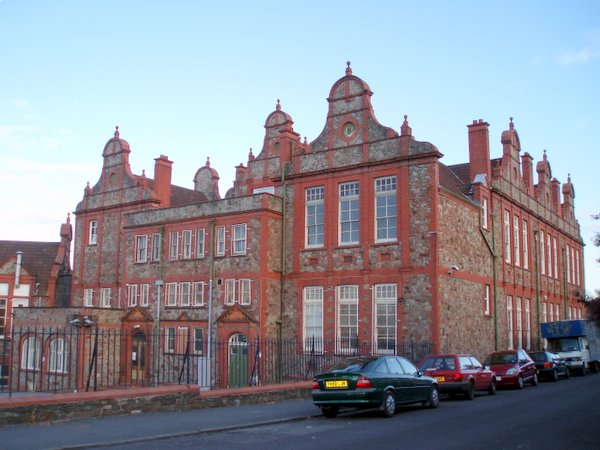

Location
- Fairlawn Road, Montpelier; Bristol, BS6 5JW; England; 51.46916°N 2.58244°W

Information
- Type: grammar
- Motto: Quanti est Sapere
- Established: 1898
- Closed: 2000
- Local authority: Bristol
- Gender: Co-educational
- Age: 11 to 18
- Architect: William Larkins Bernard
- Alumni: Old Fosterians

Fairfield Grammar School was a secondary school in Bristol, England, founded in 1898 as Fairfield Secondary and Higher Grade School. It became a grammar school in 1945 and closed in 2000, to be replaced by a new comprehensive, Fairfield High School, at first on the same site, but now located in Stottbury Road, Bristol. BHES (Bristol Hospital Education Service), is now based in half of the old school, the other half is now Fairlawn Primary School.

== History ==
The school began its life under the name of Fairfield Secondary and Higher Grade School, in an imposing new building by the architect William Larkins Bernard which was described as having a "towering collection of gables". Coeducational from the beginning, it was intended for children who would stay at school until the age of sixteen or seventeen. Its aim was stated as being to give

"a methodical and progressive course of education, physical, mental and moral, of a wider scope and more advanced degree than that given in Elementary Schools, combined with workshop and laboratory practice in general, scientific and commercial subjects."

When the Higher Grade School opened in 1898, it had one hundred and eighty pupils. There were fees of £1 per term, but a quarter of the places in the school were available to non-fee-paying students, who were selected by an annual competition.

In March 1918, the school's most notable son, Archie Leach, was expelled at the age of fourteen for sneaking into the girls' lavatories. He went on to become the film star Cary Grant, and reported that Fairfield had given him "a sketchy education". His contemporary at the school, Sir Archibald Russell, was deputy to the French designer of the supersonic airliner Concorde.

In 1945, the school became a grammar school.

The school occupied a triangular site in Montpelier, Bristol, being bounded by Fairlawn Road to the west, Fairfield Road to the south east, and Falkland Road to the north west. To the north was an area of railway land. There were no on-site playing fields, but there was a hard-surfaced playground to the north of the main school. This building was listed Grade II in January 2002, at a time when the local education authority was planning to move the new Fairfield High School to a new site.

To mark the school's centenary in 1998, Ross Gilkes, a former Fairfield history master, wrote a school history which was published by the Old Fairfieldians Society.

In 2000, against a background of opposition by Bristol City Council to selective education and declining academic results, Fairfield closed as a grammar school and reopened as a comprehensive, being renamed Fairfield High School. In 2006, the new school moved to new purpose-designed buildings at Stottbury Road, Bristol. One reason for the move was that the existing site had room for only some five hundred pupils, a number which was considered to be too low.

In 2007, the former Fairfield Grammar School buildings in Fairlawn Road were used by the new Redland Green comprehensive school, after more than £20 million was spent on upgrading them, but in September 2007 this was reported to be a "temporary home", and by 2008 the school was no longer on site and was located at Redland.

== Notable Old Fairfieldians ==
- J. W. B. Barns, Professor of Egyptology at the University of Oxford
- Sir Norman Frome, ornithologist of British India
- Cary Grant (expelled, 1918).
- Ben J. Green, Cambridge mathematician
- Robert Lang, character actor
- Jill Knight, Baroness Knight of Collingtree (briefly), Conservative MP for Birmingham Edgbaston from 1966 to 1997
- Dame Mary Perkins, business woman, co-founder of Specsavers
- Elizabeth Ralph, Bristol City Archivist.
- Sir Archibald Russell, aeronautical engineer, one of the designers of Concorde, Managing Director of BAC Filton from 1966 to 1967

== See also ==
- Fairfield High School for Girls (Manchester)

== Bibliography ==
- Gilkes, Ross, Fairfield — The Life of a School (Bristol, Old Fairfieldians Society, ISBN 0-9534403-0-3)
- Stiles, Sharon, Fairfield, the First 100 Years (video, Applecart Television Facilities, 1999)
