= Peter Donald (cricketer) =

English cricketer (born 1957)

Personal information
- Full name: Peter Colligan Graham Donald
- Born: 8 August 1957 (age 69); Frenchay, Gloucestershire, England
- Batting: Right-handed
- Bowling: Right-arm off break Right-arm medium

Domestic team information
- Years: Team
- 1978: Oxford University
- 1981–1982: Wiltshire

Career statistics
Competition	First-class
Matches	1
Runs scored	1
Batting average	1.00
100s/50s	–/–
Top score	1
Catches/stumpings	–/–
- Source: Cricinfo, 27 June 2019

Peter Colligan Graham Donald (born 8 August 1957) is an English former first-class cricketer.

Donald was born at Frenchay in August 1957. He was educated at Sherborne School, before going up to St John's College, Oxford. While studying at Oxford he made a single appearance in first-class cricket for Oxford University against Yorkshire at Oxford in 1978. Batting once in the match, he was dismissed for a single run in the Oxford first-innings by Geoff Cope. He later played minor counties cricket for Wiltshire in 1981 and 1982, making fifteen appearances in the Minor Counties Championship.
