= Lord Richard Cavendish (1871–1946) =

British politician

Lieutenant Colonel The Right Honourable Lord Richard Cavendish CB, CMG, DL, JP
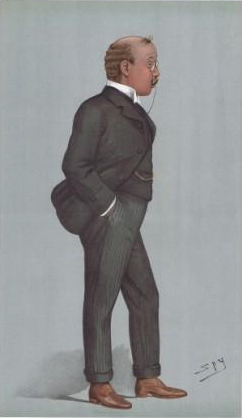
- "North Lancashire"; Cavendish as caricatured by Spy (Leslie Ward) in Vanity Fair, April 1900

Member of Parliament for North Lonsdale
- In office 1895-1906

Personal details
- Born: Richard Frederick Cavendish; 31 January 1871 Mayfair, London
- Died: 7 January 1946 (aged 74) Cartmel, Lancashire
- Party: Liberal Unionist (before 1904); Liberal Party (after 1904)
- Spouse: Lady Moyra Beauclerk (m. 1895)
- Children: 7
- Parents: Lord Edward Cavendish (father); Emma Lascelles (mother)
- Relatives: Cavendish family Victor Cavendish (brother); William Cavendish (grandfather); Blanche Howard (grandmother); William Lascelles (grandfather); Hugh Cavendish (grandson)
- Education: Trinity College, Cambridge

Lt.-Col. Lord Richard Frederick Cavendish, CB, CMG, DL, JP (31 January 1871 – 7 January 1946) was a British aristocrat, author, magistrate, and politician from the Cavendish family. He took a prominent role in public life in Lancashire, particularly in agricultural development.

== Early life and family ==
Richard was born at Devonshire House in Mayfair, the second of three sons of Lord Edward Cavendish (1838–1891), third son of the 7th Duke of Devonshire. His mother was Emma Lascelles (1838–1920), daughter of the Hon. William Lascelles, and granddaughter of the Earl of Harewood and the Earl of Carlisle.

He was educated at Eton and Trinity College, Cambridge, where he was a member of the Pitt Club.

In 1908, his elder brother, Victor succeeded his father's elder brother, the 8th Duke of Devonshire. He and his younger brother, John Spencer, were raised to the rank of duke's sons in honour of their late father and styled as lords. In 1914, Maj. Lord John Cavendish DSO was killed in action in World War I.

== Military career ==
During the First World War, Lord Richard served abroad and was wounded and mentioned in dispatches. He was appointed a Companion of the Order of St Michael and St George (CMG) in 1918 and a Companion of the Order of the Bath in 1919. As a lieutenant-colonel, he commanded a battalion of The King's Own Royal Regiment (Lancaster). During the Second World War, he was honorary colonel of the 56th (King's Own) Anti-Tank Regiment, Royal Artillery.

== Career ==
Cavendish was elected in the 1895 general election as the member of parliament (MP) for North Lonsdale. He crossed the floor from being a supporter of the Liberal Unionists to being a member of the Liberal Party in 1904. Therefore, he was one of the few Liberal MPs who lost their seat in the 1906 election. In December 1908 he was appointed chairman of the Royal Commission on Systems of Election, with the mandate "to secure a fully representative character for popularly elected legislative bodies" and "to consider whether, and how far, they, or any of them, are capable of application in this country in regard to the existing electorate". The commission reported in 1910, recommending the abolition of two member constituencies "as soon as possible"; this was implemented. The commission also recommended the adoption of an alternative vote system, which was not implemented.

In 1911, Cavendish was on Prime Minister Asquith's list of peers in case the Parliament Act 1911 was not passed by the House of Lords. He was admitted to the Privy Council in 1912.

Cavendish was President of the Royal Lancashire Agricultural Society.

== Family ==
Lord Richard was the Lord of the Manor, residing at Holker Hall (where his descendants remain to this day) and owned the Swan Hotel at Newby Bridge. He was an active freemason and a keen golfer.

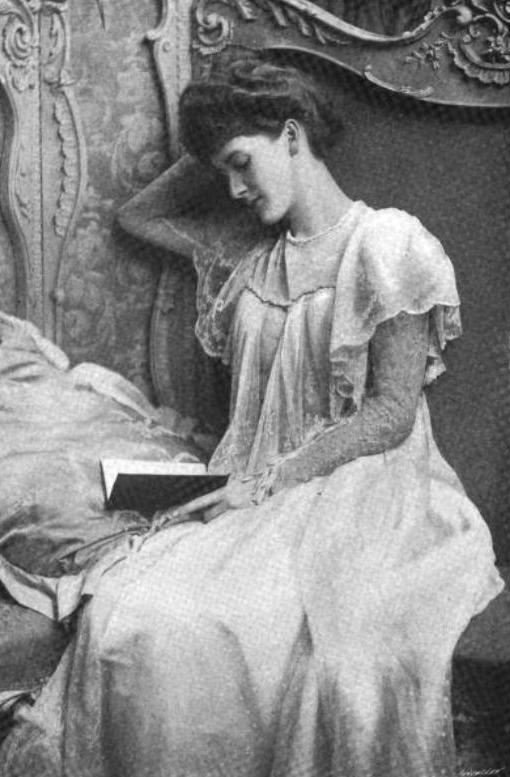
Lady Moyra Cavendish née Beauclerk, 1902

Cavendish married Lady Moyra de Vere Beauclerk, daughter of the Duke of St Albans, in 1895. They had two sons and five daughters. Their eldest son died in infancy. Their daughter Alix died aged 23 at Rest Harrow, Sandwich Bay, the home of Nancy Astor, Viscountess Astor, after a two-year "desperate battle" against illness.

- Elizabeth Vere, Marchioness of Salisbury (22 January 1897 – 5 June 1982), married Robert Gascoyne-Cecil, 5th Marquess of Salisbury
- Alix Cavendish (5 August 1901 – 29 June 1925), died unmarried
- Mary Katherine, Countess of Crawford (20 July 1903 – 20 November 1994) married David Lindsay, 28th Earl of Crawford, mother of Robert Lindsay, 29th Earl of Crawford
- John Edward Compton Cavendish (10 October 1907 – 29 May 1908)
- Diana, Viscountess Gage (15 September 1909 – 10 July 1992), married 1935 Robert Boothby, Baron Boothby (divorced 1937); Lt-Col. Hon. Ian Douglas Campbell-Gray (1942; he died 1946); married 1971 Henry Gage, 6th Viscount Gage
- Sybil Moyra Cavendish (10 August 1915 – 3 August 2004), married Lawrence Gregson Fell Dykes
- Richard Edward Osborne Cavendish (23 November 1917 – 14 August 1972), married Pamela June Dolores Lloyd-Thomas, father of Hugh Cavendish, Baron Cavendish of Furness (third in line to succeed his cousin Peregrine Cavendish, 12th Duke of Devonshire as Duke of Devonshire after William Cavendish, Earl of Burlington and his son)

His wife died in 1942. He died four years later at Holker Hall.

== Ancestry ==
Ancestors of Lord Richard Cavendish (1871–1946)

8. William Cavendish
4. William Cavendish, 7th Duke of Devonshire
9. Louisa O'Callaghan
2. Lord Edward Cavendish
10. George Howard, 6th Earl of Carlisle
5. Lady Blanche Howard
11. Lady Georgiana Cavendish
1. Lord Richard Cavendish
12. Henry Lascelles, 2nd Earl of Harewood
6. William Lascelles
13. Henrietta Sebright
3. The Hon. Emma Lascelles
14. George Howard, 6th Earl of Carlisle
7. Lady Caroline Howard
15. Lady Georgiana Cavendish

Parliament of the United Kingdom
Preceded by William Smith	Member of Parliament for North Lonsdale; 1895 – 1906	Succeeded by George Haddock
