= Montague Ainslie =

English forester and businessman (1792–1884)

- Born: 28 April 1792
- Died: 1 February 1884 (aged 91)
- Occupations: forester and businessman

Montague Ainslie DL (28 April 1792 – 1 February 1884) was an English forester and businessman whose interests included the iron ore company Harrison Ainslie.

== Early life and education ==
Son of Henry Ainslie, MD, and Agnes, daughter of William Ford, of Coniston Water Head and Grizedale, Ainslie was educated at Hawkshead Grammar School and at Sedbergh School, later studying at Charterhouse School and Haileybury and Imperial Service College.

== Activities ==
Ainslie worked in the Indian Civil Service at Bengal from 1807 to 1840, including as political agent at Blundlecund. On leaving the Indian Civil Service, Ainslie became a partner in the ironworks of Messrs Harrison and Ainslie, at Ulverston.

On inheriting the Grizedale Estate from his parents, in 1841 he converted Ford Lodge into a larger residence, which became known as Grizedale New Hall. He continued his parents' work of planting vast numbers of larch trees in the valley, expanding the development and growth of Grizedale Forest.

He built Ford House in Ulverston for his son, William George Ainslie; when William moved to London, Montague used Ford House as a town house from which to manage his business interests which included Harrison Ainslie, another iron company, and also an operator of shipping from Ulverston.

He served as a Justice of the Peace, and was appointed a Deputy Lieutenant of Lancashire in 1852.

== Marriages and children ==
Ainslie married firstly, in 1818, Sophia Mary, daughter of George Poyntz Ricketts. Their children included the barrister and first-class cricketer Montague Ainslie and businessman and politician William George Ainslie. In 1834, he married secondly Mary Ann, daughter of Colin Campbell, MD, physician-general in Bengal.
