= St Michael and All Angels Church, Hawkshead =

Coordinates: 54.3739°N 2.9990°W

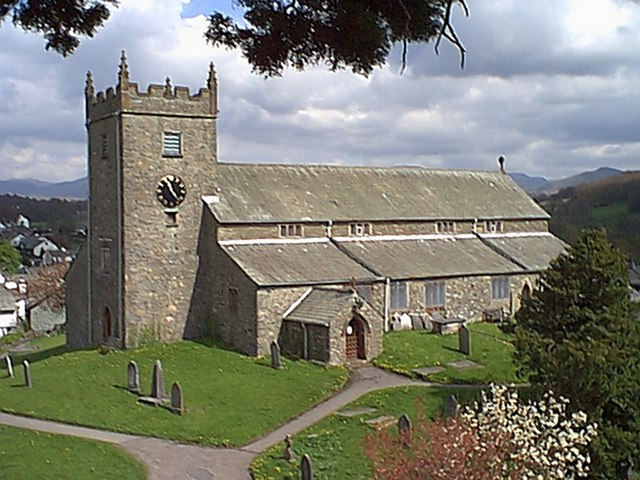
- St Michael and All Angels Church, Hawkshead, from the northwest

- Location in Cumbria
- OS grid reference: SD 352 981
- Location: Hawkshead, Cumbria
- Country: England
- Denomination: Anglican
- Website: St Michael, Hawkshead

History
- Status: Parish church

Architecture
- Functional status: Active
- Heritage designation: Grade I
- Designated: 22 March 1970
- Architectural type: Church
- Style: Gothic, Gothic Revival

Specifications
- Materials: Stone, slate roofs

Administration
- Province: York
- Diocese: Carlisle
- Archdeaconry: Westmorland and Furness
- Deanery: Windermere
- Parish: Hawkshead with Low Wray

Clergy
- Vicar: Revd John Dixon

St Michael and All Angels Church is in the village of Hawkshead, Cumbria, England. It is an active Anglican parish church in the deanery of Windermere, the archdeaconry of Westmorland and Furness, and the diocese of Carlisle. Its benefice is united with those of four local parishes to form the Benefice of Hawkshead with Low Wray and Sawrey and Rusland and Satterthwaite. The church is recorded in the National Heritage List for England as a designated Grade I listed building. Hyde and Pevsner, in the Buildings of England series, describe it as being "one of the best Lake District churches".

== History ==
A chapel existed on the site in the 12th century, which was extended to the length of the present church in about 1300. The north and south aisles were added in 1500. In 1578 its status was raised from being a chapelry that of a parish; credit for this has been given to Edwin Sandys, who was born in the village, and who became Archbishop of York. The roof of the nave was raised in 1585, and the clerestory was created. In about 1793 a vestry and hearse house were built. In 1680 James Addison, from the village of Hornby in the Lune Valley, was commissioned to clean the interior walls of the church, to paint 26 biblical texts with decorative borders, and to paint borders round the pillars and arcades. These were repainted in 1711–12 by William Mackerath, who added a list of churchwardens, and a text in local dialect near the pulpit. These were restored in 1875 by William Bolton. Between 1875 and the end of the century, rendering was removed from the exterior of the church, and battlements and pinnacles were added to the tower. A south porch was added in 1935. In 1965 a new organ was installed, which allowed the creation of a chapel dedicated to St James.

== Architecture ==
=== Exterior ===
The church is constructed in rubble stone with a slate roof. Its plan consists of a nave and chancel without any division, north and south aisles and chapels, a northwest vestry, a south porch, and a west tower. On the west side of the tower is a doorway with a two-light window above. On the south side is a small window and a clock face. The bell openings are louvred with straight heads, and the parapet is embattled with corner pinnacles. The vestry has three-light mullioned windows, and along the side of the north aisle are similar windows. The north (Sandys) chapel has a three-light east window, a five-light north window and a doorway above which are the Sandys arms and the date 1578. On each side of the clerestory are four three-light windows. The east window of the chancel has five lights containing Perpendicular tracery. Along the side of the south aisle are three windows of two and three lights. On the side of the south chapel are a doorway converted into a window, and a two-light window; its east window has three lights.

=== Interior ===
The interior of the church is thickly whitewashed. The five-bay arcades consist of segmental arches carried on round piers, without capitals or bases. The wall paintings are still present. In the north chapel is the chest tomb dated 1578 of the parents of Archbishop Sandys, with recumbent effigies. On the west wall of the church are elaborate monuments moved from St Dionis Backchurch, London, when it was demolished in 1878. The stained glass in the east window dated 1894 is by Hardman, and in the windows on the south side of the church, dating from between 1884 and 1901, are by H. W. Lonsdale. The two-manual pipe organ by Rushworth and Dreaper of Liverpool was installed in 1965, replacing an earlier organ. There is a ring of eight bells. Five of these were cast in 1765 by James Harrison I, one dating from 1810 is possibly by John Stevenson, and the other two were cast by John Taylor in 1958.

== External features ==
In the churchyard is a sundial carrying a plate dated 1693, which is listed at Grade II.

== See also ==
- Grade I listed churches in Cumbria
- Grade I listed buildings in Cumbria
- Listed buildings in Hawkshead
