= Richard Rawlinson =

English antiquarian and cleric (1690–1755)

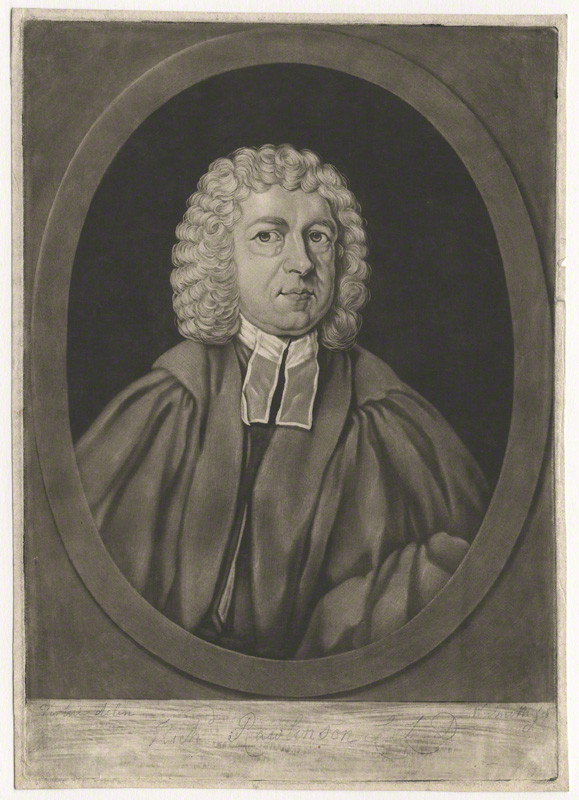
Richard Rawlinson

Richard Rawlinson FRS (3 January 1690 – 6 April 1755) was an English clergyman and antiquarian collector of books and manuscripts, which he bequeathed to the Bodleian Library, Oxford.

== Life ==
Richard Rawlinson was a younger son of Sir Thomas Rawlinson (1647–1708), Lord Mayor of the City of London in 1705–6, and a brother of Thomas Rawlinson (1681–1725), the bibliophile who ruined himself in the South Sea Company, at whose sale in 1734 Richard bought many of the Orientalia. He was educated at St Paul's School, at Eton College, and at St John's College, Oxford. In 1714, he was elected a Fellow of the Royal Society, where he was inducted by Newton. Rawlinson was a Jacobite and maintained a strong support for the exiled Stuart royal family throughout his life. In 1716 was ordained as a deacon and then priest in the nonjuring Church of England (see Nonjuring schism), the ceremony being performed by the non-juring Usager bishop, Jeremy Collier. Rawlinson was, in 1728, consecrated as a bishop in the nonjuring church by Bishops Gandy, Blackbourne and Doughty. On Blackbourne's death in 1741 he became the senior nonjuring bishop in London, and still maintained a congregation into the mid-1740s. He was particularly concerned with collecting the history and archives of the nonjurors, but later squabbled with his fellow bishops in continuing the succession with the consecration of Robert Gordon.

Rawlinson travelled in England and on the continent of Europe, where he passed several years, making very diverse collections of books, manuscripts, pictures and curiosities of manuscripts, coins and curiosities, his books alone forming three libraries, English, foreign and Classical.

Rawlinson was a friend of the antiquarian Thomas Hearne and, among his voluminous writings, published a Life of the antiquary Anthony Wood.

Towards the end of his life, Rawlinson quarrelled with both the Royal Society and the Society of Antiquaries. Cutting the Society of Antiquaries from his bequests, he began transferring his collections to the Bodleian. Among his collection was a copperplate known as the Bodleian Plate depicting structures in Williamsburg, Virginia. A series of almanacs in 175 volumes, ranging in date from 1607 to 1747 arrived in 1752–55. At his death, Rawlinson left to the Library 5,205 manuscripts bound in volumes that include many rare broadsides and other printed ephemera, his curiosities, and some other property that endowed a professorship of Anglo-Saxon at Oxford University. The Rawlinsonian Professor of Anglo-Saxon was first appointed in 1795. He was also a benefactor to St John's College, Oxford.

He died at Islington, London.

Richard Rawlinson is buried at St John's College, Oxford, allegedly holding the skull of Christopher Layer, an executed Jacobite. . Rawlinson Road in North Oxford is named after him.
