= Frenchay =

Village in Gloucestershire, England

Coordinates: 51.4979°N 2.5194°W

- Location within Gloucestershire
- OS grid reference: ST640778
- Civil parish: Winterbourne
- Unitary authority: South Gloucestershire
- Ceremonial county: Gloucestershire
- Region: South West
- Country: England
- Sovereign state: United Kingdom
- Post town: BRISTOL
- Postcode district: BS16
- Dialling code: 0117
- Police: Avon and Somerset
- Fire: Avon
- Ambulance: South Western
- UK Parliament: Filton and Bradley Stoke

Frenchay is a village in South Gloucestershire, England. It is part of the Bristol Built-up Area, located 5 miles (8 km) north-east of Bristol city centre.

Frenchay was designated as a conservation area in 1975 in recognition of its unique architectural and historic character and appearance.

The village is situated between the B4058 road, which runs parallel to the M32 motorway in the west, and the wooded River Frome valley to the south and east. To the north, the built-up area ends at the A4174 Avon ring road, beyond which is the Avon Green Belt.

Frenchay village has much green space, including the common, walks along the River Frome, and a moor owned by The National Trust. The Village Hall is a village hub, and there is an annual village flower show. Frenchay Park, an adjacent suburb, is situated within Bristol city limits.

Frenchay gives its name to the Frenchay Campus of the University of the West of England, though the campus itself is situated in the neighbouring parish of Stoke Gifford.

== History ==
Frenchay was first recorded in 1257 as Fromscawe and later as Fromeshaw, meaning the wood on the Frome.

Frenchay's largest place of worship is the Anglican Church of St John the Baptist, adjacent to the large village common, which is overlooked by a number of 18th-century houses principally built by wealthy Quaker families. These include the very fine former Rectory, Bradford's House and the adjacent Frenchay Common House. Also overlooking the common is the village school which dates from 1842. The village also contains a Catholic church, a Quaker Meeting House and a Unitarian chapel.

Cricket was played on Frenchay Common from early in the nineteenth century, apparently on the initiative of the Wadham family who lived at Frenchay Manor House and who owned farms locally at Doynton, Pomfrey, Mangotsfield, Downend and Frenchay, and many of whom are buried in the graveyard of St John the Baptist Church.

W.G. Grace, the famous Victorian cricketer, whose family lived in the next village of Downend, was captain of the village cricket team. The Frenchay Cricket Club, which is said to have been the first village club in the county, was established in 1846.

Frenchay's earliest place of worship was the Quaker Meeting House, established in 1670 and replaced with a new building in 1809.

Many Quaker merchants from nearby Bristol made their homes here, including Joseph Storrs Fry, the Quaker chocolate manufacturer, who styled his company J S Fry & Sons, which manufactured the first ever commercially available chocolate bar in the world. He moved to Grove House (now Riverwood House) in 1800. He died in 1835 and is buried in the burying ground behind the Meeting House along with his wife and daughter, Pricilla.

Frenchay was the home to Frenchay Hospital, greatly expanded during World War II for the United States Army, which treated wounded soldiers returning from the D-Day landings in Normandy. Facilities merged with Southmead Hospital, further towards the centre of the city, in 2014. A&E services closed on 19 May 2014. The closure of Frenchay Hospital has made way for a new housing development.

The very small Frenchay Village Museum is planned to move to Begbrook Green Park. It currently sits near the newly built houses near Frenchay Primary School.

=== Wadhams of Frenchay Manor ===
John Wadham (1762–1843) of Frenchay Manor House was, from 1789, a co-owner and director of Wadham, Ricketts & Co, later Wadham, Ricketts, Fry & Co, which manufactured Bristol blue glass at the Phoenix Glassworks near Temple Gate, Bristol, examples of which can be seen in Bristol Museum, and was a director of the Bristol Floating Harbour Company in 1820.

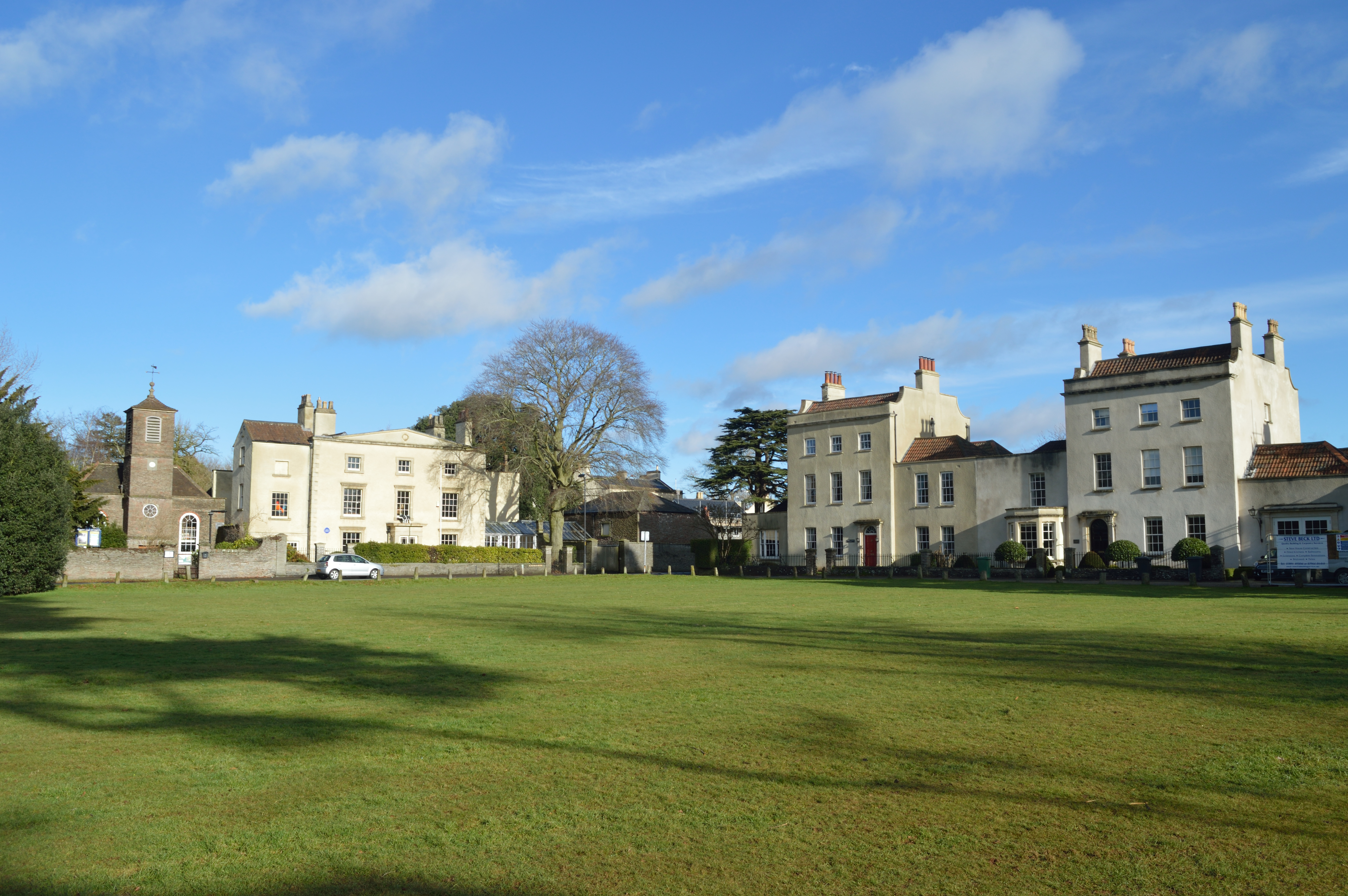
Frenchay Common, showing grade II* listed Frenchay Unitarian Chapel and three grade II listed houses

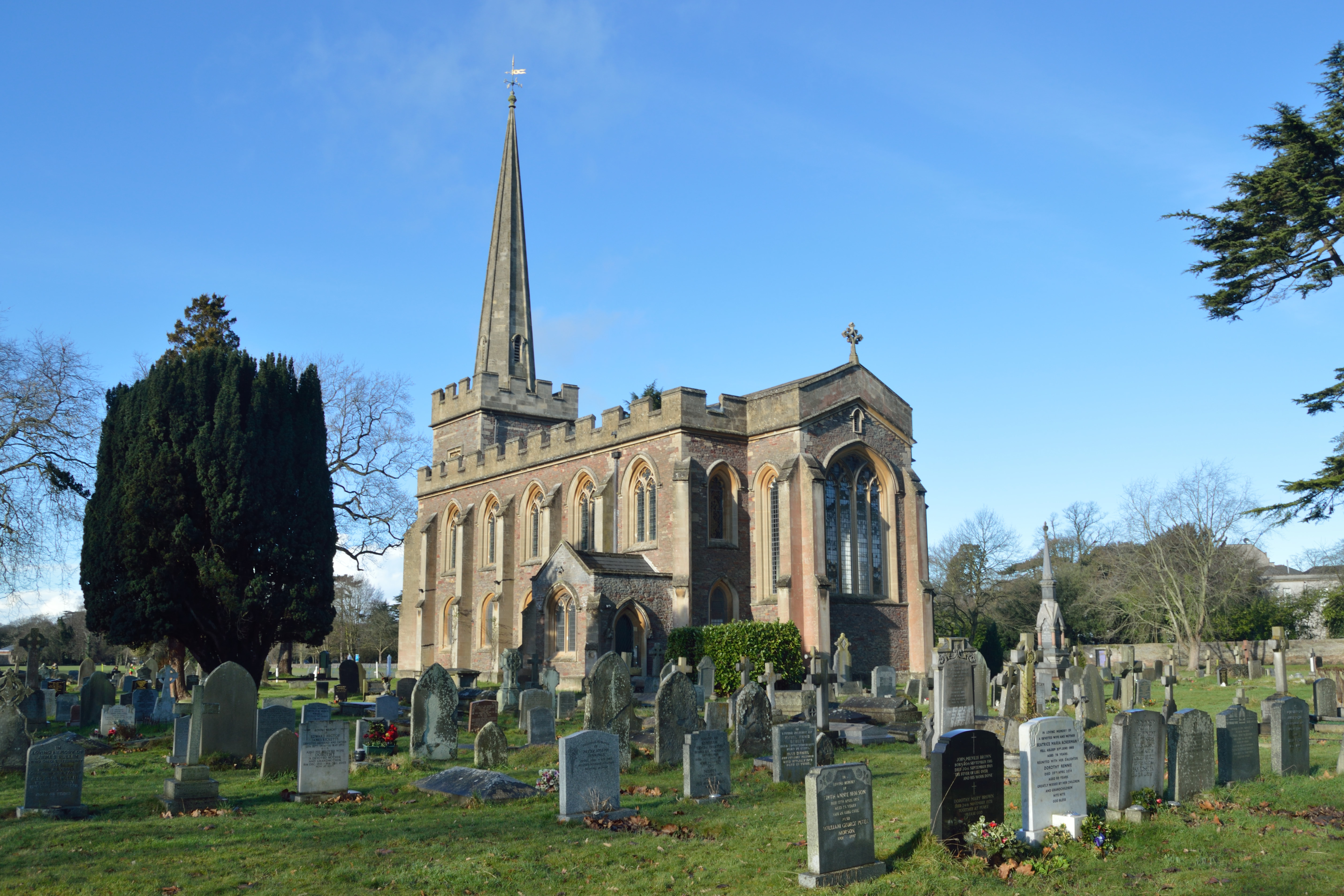
St John the Baptist Church

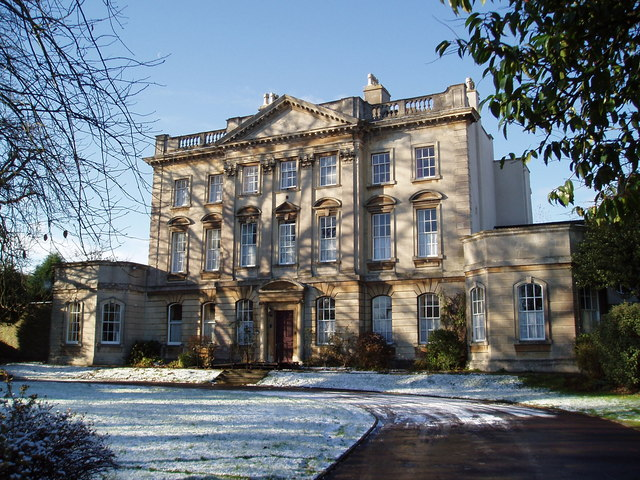
Frenchay Manor House, a grade II* listed building, now a care home

His son Thomas Wadham (1797–1849) was High Sheriff of Bristol in 1843, the year that Isambard Kingdom Brunel launched his ship SS Great Britain in Bristol Harbour. Thomas Wadham and his son the Rev. John Wadham were active in setting up the Winterbourne National School and his daughters were involved on the school's women's committee.

Thomas's son Edward Wadham (1828–1913), Mineral Agent to Walter Montagu Douglas Scott, 5th Duke of Buccleuch took his skills as a civil engineer who had worked under Brunel and his love of cricket to Barrow-in-Furness where, from 1851 until his death in 1913, he played an important part in the development of what had been a tiny hamlet into the biggest iron and steel centre in the world, and a major shipbuilding force, in just forty years.

== Notable people ==
- Peter Donald (born 1957), cricketer
- J.S Fry, English type-founder and chocolate maker, founding the family chocolate company that would later become J. S. Fry & Sons, and founder of the Bristol branch of the Quaker Fry family.
- John Wadham (1762–1843) of Fry & Co, which manufactured Bristol blue glass at the Phoenix Glassworks near Temple Gate, Bristol.
- W.G. Grace, Famous Victorian cricketer.
- Horace Gould a British racing driver from Bristol.
- Nigel De Brulier, originally Francis George Packer, British actor.
