= Thomas Rawlinson (barrister) =

English barrister and bibliophile

Thomas Rawlinson (1681–1725) was an English barrister, known as a bibliophile.

== Life ==
Rawlinson was born in the Old Bailey in the parish of St. Sepulchre, London, on 25 March 1681, the eldest son of Sir Thomas Rawlinson (1647–1708), and his wife Mary Taylor (died 1725), eldest daughter of Richard Taylor of Turnham Green, Middlesex; Richard Rawlinson was a younger brother. After education under William Day at Cheam, and at Eton College under John Newborough, he matriculated at St John's College, Oxford on 25 February 1699. He left the university in 1701, and studied at the Middle Temple, where he had been entered on 7 January 1696.

Rawlinson was called to the bar on 19 May 1705, and then made a tour through England and the Low Countries. Returning to London, he concentrated on municipal law, but succeeded to a large estate on the death of his father in 1708. He resided for some years in Gray's Inn, where his accumulation of books compelled him to sleep in a passage. In 1716 he hired London House, Aldersgate for his library, stacked three deep. Joseph Addison is supposed to have had Rawlinson in mind when (in The Tatler, No. 158) he wrote on Tom Folio, a "learned idiot".

Rawlinson was elected a governor of Bridewell and Bethlehem Hospital in 1706, and of St. Bartholomew's Hospital in 1712. He became a Fellow of the Royal Society on 19 February 1713, and of the Society of Antiquaries of London in 1724. He married, on 22 September 1724, his servant Amy Frewin, formerly a maid at a coffee-house in Aldersgate Street, and died without issue at London House on 6 August 1725. He was buried in St Botolph's Aldersgate.

== Collections and associations ==
Rawlinson collected books, manuscripts, and some pictures. He was interested in editions of classical authors, and English history. His sole publication under his own name was a copy of verses in the Oxford University Collection on the death of the Duke of Gloucester in 1700. He was on close terms with Joseph Ames, John Murray the bibliophile, and John Bagford; Michael Maittaire dedicated his Juvenal to him in 1716. Thomas Hearne, a fellow Jacobite, borrowed manuscripts from him: his Aluredi Beverlacensis Annales (1716) was printed from a manuscript in Rawlinson's collection.

Rawlinson's collection of printed books, was sold in parts, the first sale beginning on 7 March 1722, the sixteenth and last on 4 March 1734, and each occupying between fifteen and thirty days. Of these sales the first six were arranged for by Rawlinson himself (though the sixth took place after his death), and (according to William Oldisworth's account to Hearne) were linked to losses in the South Sea Bubble; the remainder by his brother Richard. At the last sale (besides 800 printed books) were sold the manuscripts, 1,020 in number. The auctioneer was Thomas Ballard; catalogues exist. The pictures, including a crayon portrait of the collector by his brother Richard, were sold by Ballard at the Two Golden Balls, Hart Street, Covent Garden, on 4 and 5 April 1734. Charles Davis was also involved in disposing of the library.

== Notes ==
Attribution

This article incorporates text from a publication now in the public domain: Lee, Sidney, ed. (1896). "Rawlinson, Thomas (1681-1725)". Dictionary of National Biography. Vol. 47. London: Smith, Elder & Co.
