= St John the Baptist, Frenchay =

Church in Bristol, England

St John the Baptist
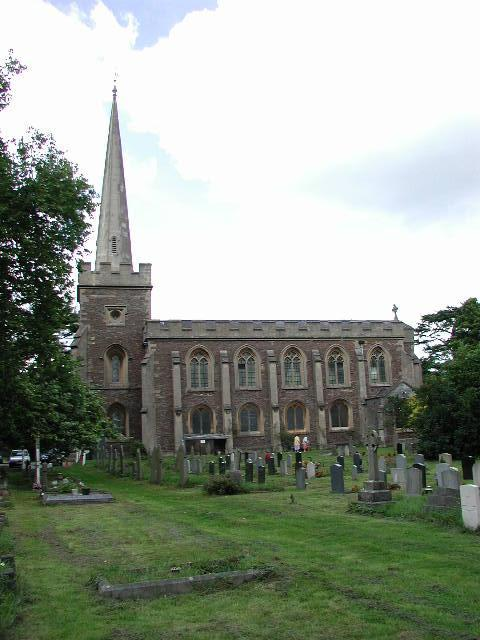

- Location within Bristol

General information
- Location: Bristol, England
- Coordinates: 51.495012°N 2.521217°W
- Completed: 1834

St John the Baptist is a church in the Frenchay area of Bristol, England.

== History ==
The foundations of the church were completed in 1834 by Henry Rumley. The work on the vestry started in 1887 and was completed by the local architect William Larkins Bernard.

It has been designated by English Heritage as a grade II listed building.

The large church has a low battlemented tower with a slender spire which overlooks the common.

The churchyard contains the war graves of six service personnel of World War I and three of World War II.

== See also ==
- Churches in Bristol
- Grade II listed buildings in Bristol
