= North Lonsdale (constituency) =

Parliamentary constituency in the United Kingdom, 1885–1918

- Former county constituency for the House of Commons
- County: Lancashire

1885–1918
- Seats: One
- Created from: North Lancashire
- Replaced by: Lonsdale

North Lonsdale was a parliamentary constituency in north Lancashire. It returned one Member of Parliament (MP) to the House of Commons of the Parliament of the United Kingdom.

The constituency was created under the Redistribution of Seats Act 1885, when the two-seat North Lancashire constituency was replaced and divided by a number of single-seat divisions.

The North Lonsdale Rural District, which was created in 1894, nine years after the constituency was created, was at the time an exclave of Lancashire. The area is now in Cumbria.

== Members of Parliament ==
Election	Member	Party
1885	William George Ainslie	Conservative
1892	William Smith	Liberal
1895	Richard Cavendish	Liberal Unionist, later Liberal
1906	George Haddock	Conservative
1918	constituency abolished	

== Elections ==
Decades:	1880s; 1890s; 1900s; 1910s

=== Elections in the 1880s ===
Herschell

General election 1885: North Lonsdale
Party	Candidate	Votes	%	±%
Conservative	William George Ainslie	4,166	51.4	
Liberal	Farrer Herschell	3,944	48.6	
Majority		222	2.8	
Turnout		8,110	88.0	
Registered electors		9,219		
Conservative win (new seat)				

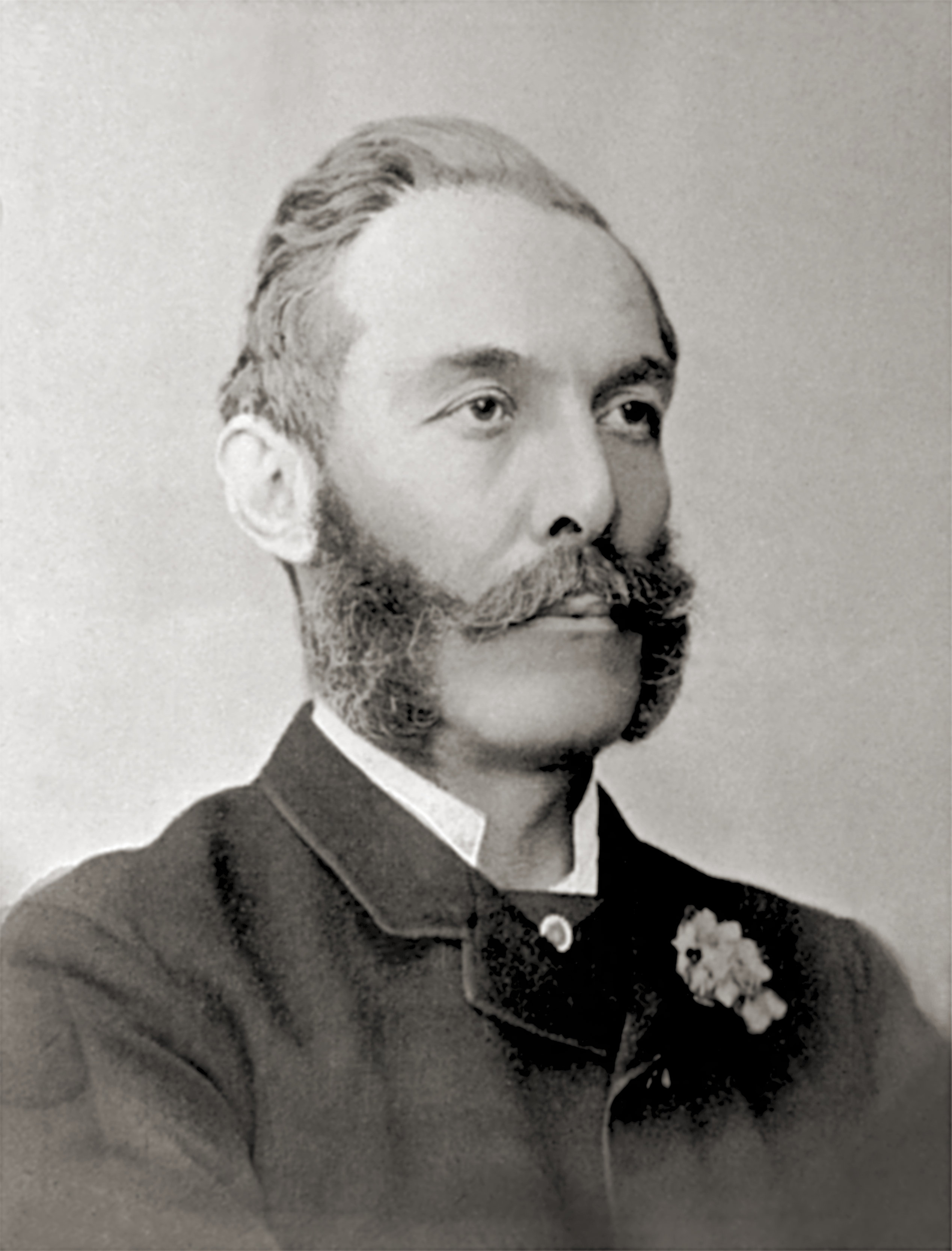
Ainslie

General election 1886: North Lonsdale
Party	Candidate	Votes	%	±%
Conservative	William George Ainslie	4,063	55.5	+4.1
Liberal	William Henry Martin-Edmunds	3,263	44.5	−4.1
Majority		800	11.0	+8.2
Turnout		7,326	79.5	−8.5
Registered electors		9,219		
Conservative hold		Swing	+4.1	

=== Elections in the 1890s ===
General election 1892: North Lonsdale
Party	Candidate	Votes	%	±%
Liberal	William Smith	4,203	55.1	+10.6
Conservative	William Dillworth Crewdson	3,426	44.9	−10.6
Majority		777	10.2	N/A
Turnout		7,629	82.6	+3.1
Registered electors		9,236		
Liberal gain from Conservative		Swing	+10.6	

General election 1895: North Lonsdale
Party	Candidate	Votes	%	±%
Liberal Unionist	Richard Cavendish	4,313	54.4	+9.5
Liberal	Hugh Halkett	3,610	45.6	−9.5
Majority		703	8.8	N/A
Turnout		7,923	83.8	+1.2
Registered electors		9,458		
Liberal Unionist gain from Liberal		Swing	+9.5	

=== Elections in the 1900s ===
General election 1900: North Lonsdale
Party	Candidate	Votes	%	±%
Liberal Unionist	Richard Cavendish	Unopposed		
Liberal Unionist hold				

General election 1906: North Lonsdale
Party	Candidate	Votes	%	±%
Conservative	George Haddock	4,121	51.1	N/A
Liberal	Richard Cavendish	3,942	48.9	New
Majority		179	2.2	N/A
Turnout		8,063	82.8	N/A
Registered electors		9,738		
Conservative hold				

=== Elections in the 1910s ===
General election January 1910: North Lonsdale
Party	Candidate	Votes	%	±%
Conservative	George Haddock	4,329	51.0	−0.1
Liberal	Joseph Bliss	4,160	49.0	+0.1
Majority		169	2.0	−0.2
Turnout		8,489	87.5	+4.7
Registered electors		9,702		
Conservative hold		Swing	-0.1	

General election December 1910: North Lonsdale
Party	Candidate	Votes	%	±%
Conservative	George Haddock	4,140	50.5	−0.5
Liberal	Joseph Bliss	4,066	49.5	+0.5
Majority		74	1.0	−1.0
Turnout		8,206	84.6	−2.9
Registered electors		9,702		
Conservative hold		Swing	-0.5	
