= William George Ainslie =

British politician

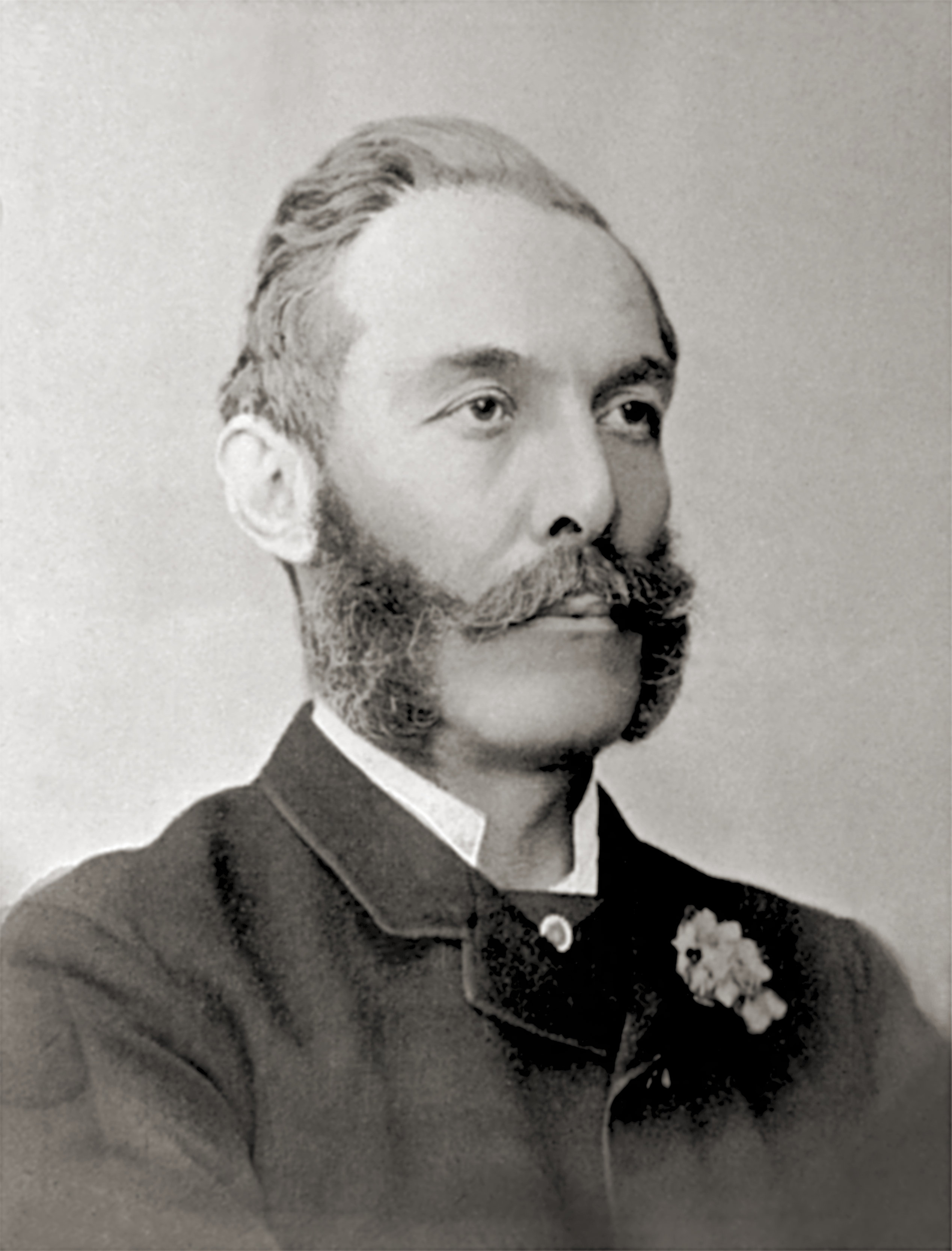
William George Ainslie

William George Ainslie JP DL MP (9 January 1832 – 10 February 1893) was a British Conservative politician, magistrate, ironmaster and stockbroker.

== Early life ==
Born in 1832 in Bengal, India, and educated at Sedbergh School, Ainslie was a son of Montague Ainslie (1792–1884), a native of Kendal in Westmorland.

Ainslie's father, after attending the East India Company College, entered the East India Company's service and was Political Agent to Lord William Bentinck while he was Governor-General of India (1828–1835), and later returned to Grizedale Hall in Lancashire where he became a Justice of the Peace and a Deputy Lieutenant for the county.

Ainslie's father built a house for him at Ulverston. Set in parkland, the house was named Ford Park in honour of Montague Ainslie's grandfather, the ironmaster William Ford.

== Career ==
Ainslie, like his father before him, entered the service of the East India Company, but spent only a short time in India. In 1849, he entered the family firm of Harrison Ainslie & Co, which traded as Ironmasters at Newland Furnace, Ulverston, Lancashire, and Lorn Furnace, Bonaw, Argyll, and as gunpowder manufacturers at Melfort, near Oban. The firm, which also had shipping interests, had carried the name of Ainslie since 1785. Ainslie was also a partner in the stockbroking firm of R. S. and C. J. Scrimgeour and Co., of Threadneedle Street in the City of London.

Ainslie became senior partner of Harrison, Ainslie & Co. in 1863, on the death of Benson Harrison. In 1861, he was living at Ford House, Ulverston, but by 1869 he had become permanently based in London to supervise the financial affairs of the firm.

In 1860, Ainslie was commissioned as a Captain of the North Lonsdale (or 37th) Lancashire Rifle Volunteers. In June 1863 it was announced that "The 71st Lancashire Rifle Volunteer Corps having been struck out of the records of the War Office, will henceforth cease to hold any number or designation in the Volunteer Force, and her Majesty has been graciously pleased to approve of the services of Lieutenants Innes Macpherson and William James Audsley and Ensign John Milligan in that Corps being dispensed with. Her Majesty has been graciously pleased to accept the resignations of the following officers... Captain William George Ainslie in the 37th A Lancashire Rifle Volunteer Corps."

In October 1863, he withdrew from his partnership in the family firm of Harrison, Ainslie & Co., and retired from his partnership in the stockbroking firm of Scrimgeour and Co. on 30 December 1865.

In December 1868, the Office of the Commissioners of Patents for Inventions gave Ainslie provisional protection "To William George Ainslie, of 3, East India-avenue, Leadenhall-street, in the city of London, for the invention of "improvements in means for drying peat, peat compounds, and other materials"."

Although Ainslie had withdrawn from his partnership in Harrison Ainslie, in 1879 he held 31% of the shares and drew a salary of £500 a year as manager.

Ainslie became the first chairman of the North Lonsdale Iron and steel company when the company was established in 1873.

In 1885, Ainslie was elected as member of parliament for North Lonsdale in Lancashire and held the seat until 1892.

At the time of his death, aged 61, in February 1893, Ainslie was senior partner in Harrison, Ainslie & Co. Following his death, he was described in the London Gazette as "...formerly of Furness Lodge, East Sheen, in the county of Surrey, and late of 21 Ennismore-gardens, Kensington, in the county of Middlesex, and Grizedale, Hawkshead, in the county of Lancaster". Administration of his Will was granted to his son William Langstaff Ainslie.

== Wife and children ==
On 29 April 1858, Ainslie married Eliza Anne Sawer, daughter of Thomas Sawer of Ickham, Kent, and they had ten children; son Charles Bernard Ainslie was father of the Liberal politician Jack Ainslie and of Constance Mangskau (1907–1990), who had a Thai mother, Kunkaew, and became a nurse.

Ainslie's widow outlived him by six years, dying on 27 December 1899.

== See also ==
- Harrison Ainslie

Parliament of the United Kingdom
New constituency	Member of Parliament for North Lonsdale; 1885 – 1892	Succeeded by William Smith
