= Hawkshead =

Village in Cumbria, England

Coordinates: 54.375°N 2.999°W

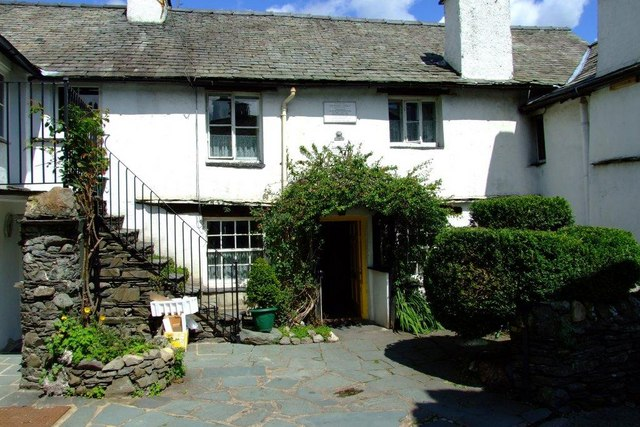
- Ann Tyson's House

- Location within Cumbria
- Population: 508 (Parish, 2021); 257 (Built-up area, 2021)
- OS grid reference: SD3598
- Civil parish: Hawkshead
- Unitary authority: Westmorland and Furness
- Ceremonial county: Cumbria
- Region: North West
- Country: England
- Sovereign state: United Kingdom
- Post town: AMBLESIDE
- Postcode district: LA22
- Dialling code: 015394
- Police: Cumbria
- Fire: Cumbria
- Ambulance: North West
- UK Parliament: Westmorland and Lonsdale
- Website: hawkshead-village.co.uk

Hawkshead is a village and civil parish in Westmorland and Furness, Cumbria, England. It lies within the Lake District National Park and is historically part of Lancashire. The parish includes the hamlets of Hawkshead Hill, 1.2 miles (1.9 km) to the north west, and Outgate, a similar distance north. Hawkshead contains one primary school and four public houses.

== Geography ==
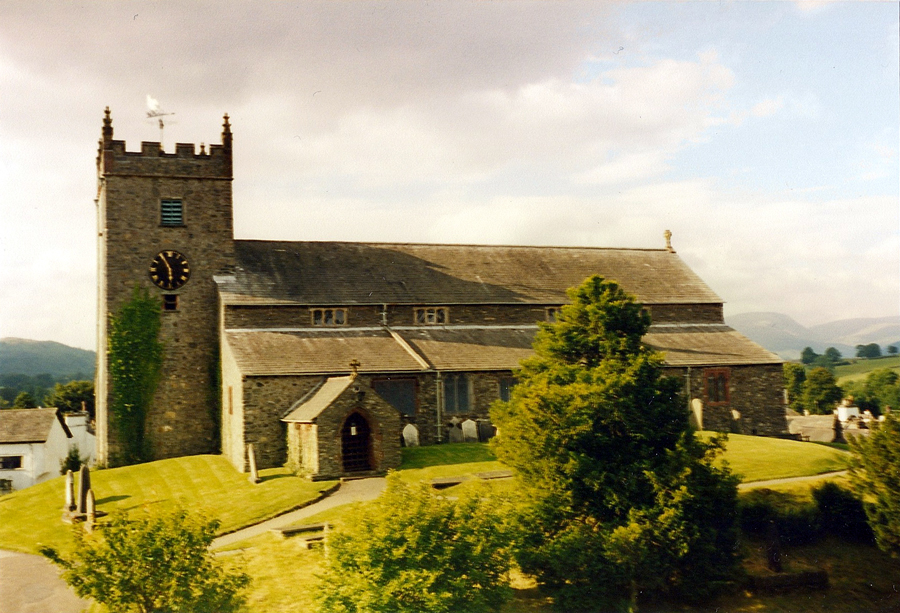
Hawkshead Parish Church, built in 1300 and rebuilt in the 16th century

Hawkshead is just north of Esthwaite Water, in a valley to the west of Windermere and east of Coniston Water. It is part of Furness, making it a part of the ancient county of Lancashire.

== History ==
The township of Hawkshead was originally owned by the monks of Furness Abbey; nearby Colthouse derives its name from the stables owned by the Abbey. Hawkshead grew to be an important wool market in medieval times and later as a market town after the Dissolution of the Monasteries in 1532. It was granted its first market charter by King James I in 1608. In 1585, Hawkshead Grammar School was established by Archbishop Edwin Sandys of York after he successfully petitioned Queen Elizabeth I for a charter to establish a governing body.

In the 18th and 19th centuries, Hawkshead became a village of local importance. Hawkshead Market Hall was completed in 1790.

William Wordsworth (afterwards poet laureate) was educated at Hawkshead Grammar School, whilst Beatrix Potter lived nearby as did William Heelis, a local solicitor, in the early 20th century.

With the formation of the Lake District National Park in 1951, tourism grew in importance, though traditional farming still goes on around the village. Hawkshead has a timeless atmosphere and consists of a characterful warren of alleys, overhanging gables and a series of mediaeval squares. It is eloquently described in William Wordsworth's poem The Prelude.

Much of the land in and around the village is now owned by the National Trust. The National Trust property is called Hawkshead and Claife.

== Governance ==
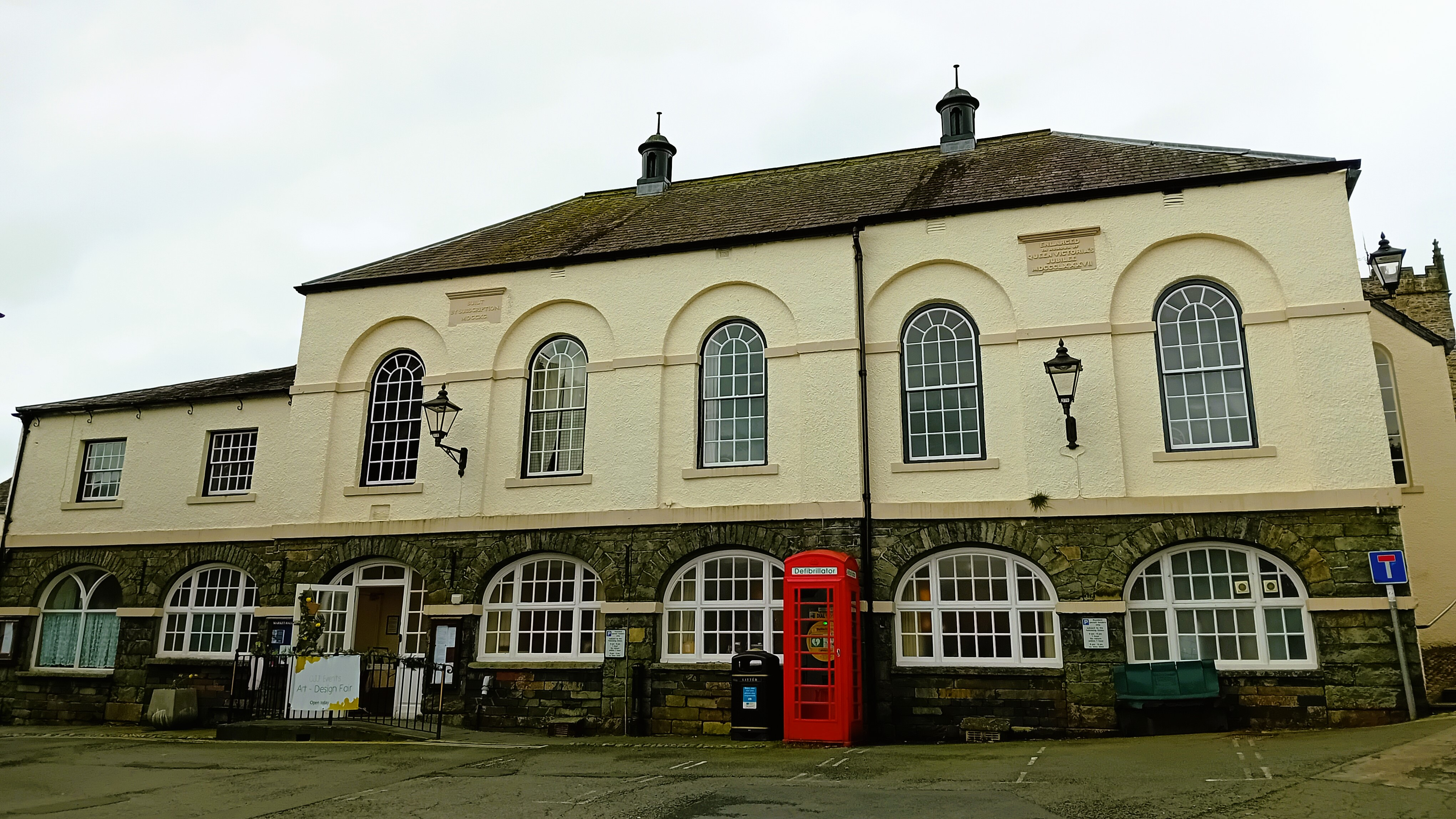
Hawkshead Market Hall

There are two tiers of local government covering Hawkshead, at parish and unitary authority level: Hawkshead Parish Council and Westmorland and Furness Council. The parish council meets at Hawkshead Market Hall. For elections to Westmorland and Furness Council, Hawkshead is part of the electoral ward of Coniston and Hawkshead.

=== Administrative history ===
Hawkshead was historically a chapelry within the ancient parish of Dalton-in-Furness in Lancashire. Hawkshead became a separate parish in 1578. The parish of Hawkshead then contained four townships, being Claife, Colton, Satterthwaite and a township called 'Hawkshead and Monk Coniston with Skelwith' covering the north-western part of the parish, including the village. Colton was made a separate parish in 1676; the other three townships were all also made civil parishes in 1866.

When elected parish and district councils were established in 1894, it was decided to split up the civil parish of Hawkshead and Monk Coniston with Skelwith. The Monk Coniston area was added to the parish of Coniston, and the rest was split between new civil parishes called Skelwith and Hawkshead. Hawkshead was included in the Ulverston Rural District, which renamed itself North Lonsdale Rural District in 1960. Hawkshead was transferred to the new county of Cumbria in 1974, forming part of the South Lakeland district. In 2023 it became part of the unitary authority of Westmorland and Furness.

=== Parliamentary representation ===
Hawkshead is part of the Westmorland and Lonsdale parliamentary constituency and is represented in parliament by Tim Farron MP.

== Transport ==
1 bus route serves the village. The 505 to Coniston or to Ambleside or Windermere. This route is operated by Stagecoach.

== See also ==
- Listed buildings in Hawkshead
