= Michael Denison =

English actor (1915–1998)

Michael Denison CBE FRSA
- With wife, Dulcie Gray
- Born: John Michael Terence Wellesley Denison; 1 November 1915; Doncaster, West Riding of Yorkshire, England
- Died: 22 July 1998 (aged 82); Amersham, Buckinghamshire, England
- Resting place: Little Missenden, Buckinghamshire, England
- Occupation: Actor
- Years active: 1938–1996
- Spouse: Dulcie Gray (m. 1939)

John Michael Terence Wellesley Denison (1 November 1915 – 22 July 1998) was an English actor. He often appeared with his wife, Dulcie Gray, with whom he featured in several films and more than 100 West End theatre productions.

After a conventional public school and university education he studied at a drama school and made his professional début in 1938. His career was interrupted by military service during the Second World War but by the end of the 1940s he re-established himself among leading actors of his generation, and remained so until his death in 1998.

He was primarily a stage actor, and appeared in a wide range of roles from Shakespeare to farce, modern drama, musicals, drawing-room comedy, and thrillers. He made some cinema films, particularly in the late 1940s and the 1950s, including My Brother Jonathan, The Glass Mountain, Angels One Five and the 1952 adaptation of the Oscar Wilde play The Importance of Being Earnest. He became known for his appearance in the title role of the long-running courtroom series Boyd QC which ran on British television from 1956 to 1964.

== Life and career ==
=== Early years ===
Denison was born in Doncaster, West Riding of Yorkshire, 1 November 1915, the only child of Gilbert Dixon Denison (1888–1959) − a paint manufacturer − and his wife, Marie Louise, née Bain (1888–1915). His mother died when Denison was three weeks old; he was brought up by his mother's sister and her husband, who had no children of their own. He was educated at Wellesley House School, a preparatory school in the coastal town of Broadstairs in Kent, followed by Harrow School and then Magdalen College, Oxford, studying modern languages. He acted with the Oxford University Dramatic Society (OUDS), making his first radio appearance when the BBC broadcast a studio adaptation of John Gielgud's OUDS production of Richard II in April 1936. He also appeared in As You Like It; in a history of the OUDS, Humphrey Carpenter writes:

Michael Denison, who had just come up to Magdalen from Harrow, "destined for the diplomatic service", walked away with most of the honours as Orlando; King-Wood called him a romantic hero, who ... looks splendid, and shows a delightful flair for comedy".

He later played Macduff in Macbeth, but according to Punch, he was "resolute but hampered by an unfortunate wig". After graduating with a second-class degree in French and German in 1937 Denison went to the Webber Douglas Academy of Dramatic Art, where he met Dulcie Gray, a fellow student, who became his wife and his frequent acting partner.

Denison made his professional stage début in 1938 as Lord Fancourt Babberly in a Frinton-on-Sea production of Charley's Aunt and in the same year, he made his first West End appearance with the London Mask company co-directed by J. B. Priestley, at the Westminster Theatre, playing Paris in Troilus and Cressida. He remained with the company until March 1939, playing a range of roles, including Gordon Whitehouse in a revival of Priestley's Dangerous Corner, Redpenny in The Doctor's Dilemma and the Rev Alexander Mill in Candida. He made his television début in January 1939, when the BBC relayed the company's production of Eugene O'Neill's Marco Millions.

Denison and Gray married in London in April 1939; they had no children. The Stage, in an obituary of Denison, observed that the couple appeared in more than 100 West End shows "and their marriage, which lasted very nearly 60 years, was regarded as one of the happiest in showbusiness". The couple, in the words of The Times, "honeymooned in rep in Aberdeen". They joined A. R. Whatmore's repertory company at His Majesty's Theatre, Aberdeen, alongside colleagues including Elspeth March and Stewart Granger. The couple appeared there together in plays including Coward's Hay Fever and The Young Idea, Shaw's Arms and the Man, Priestley's Dangerous Corner and Gerald Savory's George and Margaret. Denison and Gray returned to London in October 1939; he appeared again at the Westminster as Peter Horlett in Priestley's Music at Night and Stephen Undershaft in Shaw's Major Barbara. In March 1940 Denison and Gray joined the H. M. Tennent Players, appearing in repertory in Edinburgh and Glasgow. Denison made his film debut in the 1940 British comedy Tilly of Bloomsbury, in which he played the juvenile lead, Dick Mainwaring.

In June 1940 Denison was called up for military service. He joined the Royal Signals and then transferred to the Intelligence Corps. Gray later commented, "He left as a 24-year-old repertory actor and came home six years later as a captain in Intelligence." Denison said that being away from the theatre was a trial for him: "Not to be able to act was terrible. It meant, too, that I missed my opportunity to get a grounding in Shakespeare. I was too old to start after the war".

=== Post-war ===
While Denison was serving in the armed forces his wife's acting career flourished, and by the time he returned she was an established star. At first he was seen by some as "Mr Dulcie Gray" and he struggled to re-establish himself in his own right. He toured with Roger Livesey and Ursula Jeans in Priestley's latest play, Ever Since Paradise, and had supporting roles in two films: Hungry Hill (1947) and The Blind Goddess (1948). His career gained momentum after Gray helped to secure for him the leading role of the doctor starring opposite her in the film My Brother Jonathan (1948). This was a considerable success and saw Denison voted the sixth most popular British star of the year.

Denison returned to the West End in August 1948, playing Sir Nicholas Corbel in Rain on the Just at the Aldwych Theatre, and then, from November 1949, Michael Fuller in Queen Elizabeth Slept Here at the Strand Theatre, alongside Gray in both productions. Denison appeared in a war film, Landfall (1949), and a romantic drama film with Gray, The Glass Mountain (1949).

=== 1950s ===
After a seven-week pre-London tour, beginning in August 1950, Denison and Gray opened at the Ambassadors Theatre as Michael and Agnes in The Fourposter, a two-hander, charting the married life of a couple. For the cinema they starred in The Franchise Affair (1951), and after a cameo as a reporter in The Magic Box (1951), Denison had a major role in a war film, Angels One Five. In December 1951 he and Gray starred in a BBC television adaptation of Arnold Bennett and Edward Knoblock's play Milestones.

In 1950 Associated British Productions (ABP) had acquired the film rights to The Importance of Being Earnest, and chose Denison and Gray to play Algernon Moncrieff and Gwendolen Fairfax. The head of production wanted Gielgud to direct, and asked Denison to approach him with the suggestion. Gielgud declined: "Oh, no, I don't think so. I've been doing the play for years and years. I don't see it as a film, do you?" ABP released the filming rights to the Rank Organisation in 1951; the director, Anthony Asquith, retained Denison but cast Joan Greenwood instead of Gray as Gwendolen. In a survey of productions of Wilde Robert Tanitch describes Denison's performance in Asquith's 1952 film as "a conceited and debonair Algernon, tossing off the epigrams in a bumptious manner".

At the St James's Theatre in December 1952 Denison played Clive Jevons in Sweet Peril, with Gray as Robina Jevons; his next stage role was Brian in The Bad Samaritan at the Criterion Theatre in June, 1953. On film he appeared with Gray in There Was a Young Lady (1954), and supported Richard Greene in Contraband Spain (1955). Denison began appearing regularly on television. He was a panellist in the 1953 series of the BBC's What's My Line? and from 1956 to 1964 he starred in the title role of the ITV series Boyd QC, which ran for 78 episodes. He played what one critic called a "suave and elegant barrister ... Britain's answer to Perry Mason" (although the Boyd series came first). The first 40 episodes were transmitted live.

At the Prince's Theatre in February 1954 Denison appeared as the White Knight, Tweedledee and Humpty Dumpty in Alice Through the Looking Glass; Gray played the White Queen. They reprised these roles the following year. At the Westminster in June 1954 Denison played Francis Oberon in We Must Kill Toni. He toured South Africa with Gray from December 1954 to February 1955, in The Fourposter and Private Lives. He joined the Shakespeare Memorial Theatre Company, Stratford-on-Avon in April 1955. The company that season included Laurence Olivier, Vivien Leigh and Anthony Quayle, and Gielgud and Peter Brook were among the directors; Denison appeared as Sir Andrew Aguecheek in Twelfth Night, Bertram in All's Well That Ends Well, Dr Caius in The Merry Wives of Windsor, and Lucius in Titus Andronicus.

In November 1955 Denison turned to directing. Gray had written a play, Love Affair, which opened under her husband's direction at the Alexandra Theatre, Birmingham and transferred to the Lyric Theatre, Hammersmith in June 1956, with author and director in leading roles. In 1956 Denison appeared at the Edinburgh Festival and later at the Berlin Festival in two Shaw plays: A Village Wooing (as "A") and Fanny's First Play (as Lieut. Duvallet). He appeared in a supporting role in the 1957 film The Truth About Women.

At the Aldwych Theatre in August 1957 Denison played Charles Cuttinghame in Meet Me By Moonlight, an only moderately successful mock-Victorian musical. In 1958 he toured with Gray in a two-hander thriller, Double Cross, but his schedule for Boyd QC prevented him from appearing in the piece when it opened in the West End, and his role was taken by Terence Morgan. Denison's last stage role of the 1950s was the Duke of Hampshire, with Gray as the Duchess, in a revival of Frederick Lonsdale's Let Them Eat Cake at the Cambridge Theatre in May, 1959.

=== 1960s ===
In June 1960 Denison played the Rev James Morell in Shaw's 1898 play Candida at the Piccadilly and then Wyndham's; the run of 160 performances was the play's longest on record. Variety found the production "an eloquent tribute" to Shaw, and in particular praised Gray and Denison in the lead roles. After the London run the production toured. The couple appeared together in a revival of Heartbreak House at the Oxford Playhouse and then Wyndham's. After this they travelled to Australia, where Denison took over from Robin Bailey as Higgins in My Fair Lady in Melbourne. While in Australia he and Gray made a version of Village Wooing for television. They went to Hong Kong, appearing at the opening of the City Centre Theatre in August 1962 in a double bill of A Village Wooing and A Marriage Has Been Arranged, and then to Berlin, where the two gave a Shakespeare recital at the Berlin Drama Festival.

Back in England Denison and Gray starred in the opening production of the Ashcroft Theatre, Croydon, The Royal Gambit, a play about Henry VIII and his wives, in November 1962. The stars received better notices than the play (Punch wondered why "so inept a play" had been chosen but thought Denison "looking fairly Holbein did his best to lighten this leaden Henry"). In the West End they headed the cast in a 1963 adaptation of E. M. Forster's Where Angels Fear to Tread, which ran for 262 performances. From April to July 1964 the couple toured England and Continental Europe in a Shakespeare programme called Merely Players. In London Denison appeared in Hostile Witness at the Haymarket Theatre (November 1964) and in An Ideal Husband at the Strand (December 1965), as Sir Robert Chiltern to Gray's Lady Chiltern. They appeared together at the St Martin's Theatre in December 1966 in On Approval. Denison's later West End roles of the 1960s were Mark in Happy Family (St Martin's, November 1967), Sebastian Fleming in Number Ten (Strand, November 1967), and Andrew Pilgrim in Out of the Question (Strand, October 1968), with Gray and Gladys Cooper.

=== 1970s ===
During the 1970s Denison toured in six productions: the 18th-century comedy of manners The Clandestine Marriage (1971); a comedy-thriller, The Dragon Variation (1973); a revival of a 1930s comedy, The First Mrs Fraser (1976); a new comedy, The Earl and the Pussycat (1976), a musical, Robert and Elizabeth (1976); and Pinero's comedy The Cabinet Minister (1977).

In London, Denison played a wide range of roles during the 1970s. In 1970 he and Gray appeared in Three – a trio of one-act plays by Shaw, and then in Ibsen's The Wild Duck. The Stage commented:

Mr Denison is the self-deceiving, pitiably inadequate Hjalmar in every way. His rantings and cries, his bogus heroics, the shadows of his suppressed yearnings, his blind selfishness all are there, coming from brilliantly creative characterisation that is whole and consistent.

He appeared in The Tempest (1972 − as "a somewhat declamatory Prospero", according to one critic), and as Malvolio in Twelfth Night (1972 and 1978). and together with Gray and John Mills he starred in a William Douglas-Home comedy, At the End of the Day, at the Savoy in 1973, playing a thinly-disguised Edward Heath to the similarly fictionalised Harold and Mary Wilson of Mills and Gray. Gray and Denison appeared in a comedy, The Sack Race, in 1974, and later that year he played Mr Darling and Captain Hook in the 70th-anniversary production of Peter Pan, as he had long wanted to but other commitments had not until then allowed.

In 1975 Denison was the only white member of the cast of The Black Mikado; he played Pooh-Bah in an adaptation of the original transplanted from Japan to the Caribbean. At the Old Vic in 1978 he played what The Stage called "an amusingly mouth-pursing, bewildered Mayor" in a revival of The Lady's Not for Burning, and appeared in the same season in Twelfth Night, as Malvolio, and in Ivanov as Lebedev. His last stage appearance of the 1970s was in the National Theatre's production of Alan Ayckbourn's Bedroom Farce, in which he played Ernest to Gray's Delia.

=== 1980s ===
Of the four tours Denison made with Gray between 1980 and 1989, two were in Britain and two were of the Near and Far East. The British tours were in Douglas-Home's The Kingfisher (1980–81) and Enid Bagnold's The Chalk Garden (1989). The eastern tours were in Ayckbourn's Relatively Speaking (1981) and Ray Cooney and John Chapman's There Goes the Bride (1985).

In England they played at Windsor in Fry's Venus Observed (1980) and the farce See How They Run (1986). In the West End they appeared in Ronald Millar's A Coat of Varnish, and Shaw's Captain Brassbound's Conversion (1982); The School for Scandal (1982 and 1983) as Sir Oliver Surface and Lady Sneerwell; and Fry's Ring Round the Moon (1985 and 1988). Denison appeared without Gray in a revival of Shaw's The Apple Cart (Haymarket,1986, playing the prime minister to Peter O'Toole's King Magnus); a French farce, Court in the Act (Old Vic, 1987); and Shaw's You Never Can Tell, (Haymarket, 1987).

=== 1990s ===
In 1990 and 1991, Denison and Gray toured with Frank Thornton in Hugh Whitemore's The Best of Friends, depicting the friendship between the antiquarian Sydney Cockerell (Denison), the nun Laurentia McLachlan (Gray) and the playwright Bernard Shaw (Thornton). Later in 1991 Denison and Grey toured in The Importance of Being Earnest; she played Miss Prism and he doubled the roles of Lane and Dr Chasuble. They again appeared together in a tour of Bedroom Farce in 1992, and in the same year began a long association with Peter Hall's production of An Ideal Husband, this time in the roles of Lord Caversham and Lady Markby. It opened at the Globe in 1992, toured in 1993, returned to the West End at the Haymarket and played on Broadway in 1996 (their New York débuts), and once back in London played at the Haymarket and finally the Gielgud Theatre in 1997.

His stage commitments left little scope for cinema work, but in 1993 Denison appeared in his last film, Richard Attenborough's Shadowlands. At the Chichester Festival in 1994 he and Gray played Colonel Pickering and Mrs Higgins in Pygmalion and Admiral and Mrs Rankling in Pinero's The Schoolmistress. The Stage said of the former:

Michael Denison's Colonel is a masterpiece of timing and professionalism with movement of which a man 20 years younger would be proud. The change in him from controlling influence to blind enthusiasm for the project before again reverting to reality was alone worth seeing.

Denison's final stage tour was with Gray and Eric Sykes in Two of a Kind, a comedy by Hugh Janes, set in a retirement home. His last appearances on stage were with his wife in March and April 1998 in Curtain Up – An Evening with Michael Denison and Dulcie Gray at the Jermyn Street Theatre.

After a short illness, Denison died of liver cancer at his and Gray's home at Shardeloes, near Amersham on 22 July 1998, aged 82.

== Writings ==
Together with Gray, Denison wrote The Actor and His World (1964). He published two volumes of memoirs, covering both his own and his wife's life and career: Overture and Beginners (1973) and Double Act (1985). For the Dictionary of National Biography he contributed biographies of Sir Noël Coward and Sir Peter Daubeny (1983), Peter Bridge (1987) and Glen Byam Shaw (1994). At the time of his death he was working on a biography of J. B. Priestley, which his widow completed. It was published in 2000.

== Offices and honours ==
For many years Denison was a leading figure in the actors' trade union, Equity. He was a member of its council from 1949 to 1976, and was its vice-president in 1952, 1961–1963 and 1973. From 1975 to 1978 he was a member of the drama panel of the Arts Council of Great Britain.

Denison was decorated by Queen Elizabeth II with the Silver Jubilee Medal in 1977 and both he and his wife were appointed Commanders of the Order of the British Empire (CBE) in 1983. He was a fellow of the Royal Society of Arts.

== Partial filmography ==
- Tilly of Bloomsbury (1940)
- Hungry Hill (1947)
- The Blind Goddess (1948)
- My Brother Jonathan (1948)
- Landfall (1949)
- The Glass Mountain (1949)
- The Franchise Affair (1951)
- The Magic Box (1951)
- Angels One Five (1952)
- The Importance of Being Earnest (1952)
- There Was a Young Lady (1953)
- Contraband Spain (1955)
- The Truth About Women (1957)
- Faces in the Dark (1960)
- Village Wooing (1962)
- Shadowlands (1993)

== Sources ==
- Brandreth, Gyles (2001). John Gielgud: An Actor's Life. London: Isis. ISBN 978-0-7531-9681-6.
- Carpenter, Humphrey (1985). OUDS. Oxford: Oxford University Press. ISBN 978-0-19-212241-4.
- Denison, Michael (1985). Double Act. London: Michael Joseph. ISBN 978-0-7181-2290-4.
- Herbert, Ian, ed. (1972). Who's Who in the Theatre (fifteenth ed.). London: Sir Isaac Pitman and Sons. ISBN 978-0-273-31528-5.
- Holden, Anthony (1988). Olivier. London: Weidenfeld and Nicolson. ISBN 978-0-297-79089-1.
- Tanitch, Robert (1999). Oscar Wilde on Stage and Screen. London: Methuen. ISBN 978-0-413-72610-0.
- Wearing, J. P. (2021). The London Stage 1960–1980: A Calendar of Productions (PDF). London: Wordpress.
