= Dulcie Gray =

British actress, singer and writer (1915–2011)

Dulcie Gray CBE
- With her husband, Michael Denison when they were acting together in The Franchise Affair (1951)
- Born: Dulcie Winifred Catherine Savage Bailey; 20 November 1915; Kuala Lumpur, Malaya
- Died: 15 November 2011 (aged 95); Denville Hall, Northwood, London, England
- Occupations: Actress, mystery writer
- Years active: 1939–2002
- Spouse: Michael Denison (m. 1939; died 1998)

Dulcie Winifred Catherine Savage Denison (née Bailey; 20 November 1915 (Note: Her birth was not officially registered, and the day in November is uncertain; in common with many actresses she reduced her acknowledged age: she was given to quoting 1919 as her year of birth.) – 15 November 2011), known professionally as Dulcie Gray, was a British actress, mystery writer and lepidopterist.

While at drama school in the late 1930s she met a fellow student, Michael Denison. They married in 1939 and were together for 59 years before his death in 1998. The couple's professional careers were intertwined; in their early years they appeared in several films together and throughout their careers they frequently acted on stage together. Although she was well known for her starring roles in films of the late 1940s and early 1950s, most of Gray's career was in the theatre. Her range was extensive, and she appeared in Shakespeare, farce, thrillers, classics by Sheridan, Wilde, Chekhov, Shaw and Coward, absurdist drama, and numerous new plays. In the 1980s she became well known to British television viewers when she starred in a long-running soap opera, Howards' Way.

Alongside her acting career Gray was a prolific author, writing more than twenty books, mostly crime stories, but also non-crime novels, a volume of memoirs, a biography of J. B. Priestley and an award-winning book about butterflies, a lifelong interest of hers.

== Life and career ==
=== Early years ===
Gray was born in Kuala Lumpur, British Malaya (now Malaysia) in 1915, the younger daughter and youngest of three children of Arnold Savage Bailey (1881–1935), lawyer and member of the federal council of the Federated Malay States, and his wife, Kate Edith née Clulow Gray (1887–1942). From the age of three years and three months she attended boarding schools in Wallingford, Wokingham and Swanage. At the age of fifteen she returned to Malaya, becoming a teacher and journalist. After her father's death in an accident she moved back to Britain. She won a scholarship to an art school, but transferred to the Webber Douglas Academy of Dramatic Art, where, in 1937, she met her future husband Michael Denison.

Gray's first professional performance was as Maria in The School for Scandal at a private theatre in Stansted Park in 1938. She became engaged to Denison in March the following year; they married in April and, as The Times put it, they "honeymooned in rep in Aberdeen". They joined A. R. Whatmore's repertory company at His Majesty's Theatre, Aberdeen, alongside colleagues including Elspeth March and Stewart Granger. The couple appeared there together in plays including Coward's Hay Fever and The Young Idea, Shaw's Arms and the Man, Priestley's Dangerous Corner and Gerald Savory's George and Margaret. In March 1940 Denison and Gray joined the H. M. Tennent Players, appearing in repertory in Edinburgh and Glasgow.

=== 1940s ===
In June 1940 Denison was called up for military service in the Second World War. Gray joined a repertory company in Harrogate, appearing alongside Trevor Howard and Terence Alexander. She began broadcasting for the BBC in 1941, making 395 broadcasts in the radio soap opera Front Line Family. Her first London appearances were at the Regent's Park Open Air Theatre in 1942, playing Maria in Twelfth Night, Bianca in The Taming of the Shrew and Hermia in A Midsummer Night's Dream. At the Piccadilly Theatre later in the year she appeared as Alexandra in The Little Foxes alongside Fay Compton and Richard Attenborough. Also in 1942 she made her first film appearance in an uncredited bit part in Banana Ridge.

Her performance as Rose in the original stage adaptation of Brighton Rock at the Garrick Theatre in 1944 gave her co-star billing with Attenborough and Hermione Baddeley. The critic of the Sunday Pictorial, having praised Attenborough's performance as the vicious Pinkie, wrote, "But I hadn't reckoned on an even more amazing youngster, Dulcie Gray. Dulcie's performance as the waitress whom he marries was the loveliest, most moving thing I've seen in years". The reviewer in Punch considered that it was her "skilful and moving performance" that held the piece together. Her success in the role led to a contract with Gainsborough Pictures, for whom she made five films before the end of the war in 1945 and with them, and later other studios, she became established as a star. Among the films in which she made her name were Madonna of the Seven Moons (1945), Wanted for Murder (1946) and A Man About the House (1947).

After Denison was demobilised in 1946 Gray used her influence with the film studios to help him relaunch his acting career, and they co-starred in the 1947 film My Brother Jonathan. They co-starred again in The Glass Mountain in 1948. When the stage version of Brighton Rock was adapted for a 1948 film, Gray was considered too old, at 32, to play the 15-year-old Rose on screen, and the part went to a younger actress. (Note: Carol Marsh was cast as Rose.) During 1948 Gray and Denison made their first West End appearance together, in Rain on the Just at the Aldwych Theatre. The play and its stars won good notices, but the piece had only a short run. Their next West End production together, the farce Queen Elizabeth Slept Here, pleased the critics less but the public more and it ran for 349 performances. (Note: Gray and Denison left the cast in April 1950.)

=== 1950s ===
After a seven-week pre-London tour, beginning in August 1950, Gray and Denison opened at the Ambassadors Theatre as Michael and Agnes in The Fourposter, a two-hander, charting the married life of a couple. A Broadway transfer was proposed, but the stars' commitments in Britain prevented it, and their roles were filled in the New York production by American performers. (Note: Jessica Tandy and Hume Cronyn took the roles created by Gray and Denison.) For the cinema Gray and Denison starred in The Franchise Affair (1951), and in December 1951 they headed the cast in a BBC television adaptation of Arnold Bennett and Edward Knoblock's play Milestones. Their penultimate film together in the 1950s was Angels One Five (1952).

At the St James's Theatre in December 1952 Gray and Denison co-starred as Robina and Clive Jevons in Sweet Peril. On film they appeared in There Was a Young Lady (1952). In Alice Through the Looking Glass at the Prince's Theatre in February 1954 Gray played the White Queen and Denison appeared as the White Knight, Tweedledee and Humpty Dumpty. They reprised these roles the following year. At the Westminster Theatre in June 1954 Gray played Toni and Denison played Francis Oberon, her would-be murderer, in the comedy We Must Kill Toni. The couple toured South Africa from December 1954 to February 1955, in The Fourposter and Coward's Private Lives.

In November 1955 Love Affair, Gray's first and last attempt as a dramatist, opened under Denison's direction at the Alexandra Theatre, Birmingham and transferred to the Lyric Theatre, Hammersmith in June 1956, with author and director in leading roles. It was not a great success. Its author fared better as a novelist than as a playwright: her first novel, a crime mystery, Murder on the Stairs, was published in the same year. It received good notices and sold well. She followed it with Murder in Melbourne (1958) and Baby Face (1959).

In 1956–57 Gray toured South Africa and Australia as Lady Shotter in Coward's South Sea Bubble and Laura Reynolds in Robert Anderson's Tea and Sympathy − the latter regarded as daring in its day. In 1958 Gray and Denison toured Britain in a two-hander thriller, Double Cross, but his heavy schedule of television work (starring in the series Boyd QC) prevented him from appearing in the piece when it opened in the West End, and Gray played opposite Terence Morgan. Her last stage role of the 1950s was the Duchess of Hampshire, with Denison as the Duke, in a revival of Frederick Lonsdale's Let Them Eat Cake at the Cambridge Theatre in May 1959.

=== 1960s ===
In 1960 Gray played the title role in Shaw's Candida, with Denison as the Rev James Morell, in a West End revival that broke box-office records for the play. At the Oxford Playhouse in April 1961 she ventured into absurdist drama, playing Mary in The Bald Prima Donna and the Old Woman in The Chairs in a double bill, joined by Denison in the second of the two plays. Later in the year they played in a West End revival of Shaw's Heartbreak House, she as Lady Utterword, he as Hector Hushabye.

The couple went to Hong Kong, appearing at the opening of the City Centre Theatre in August 1962 in a double bill of A Village Wooing and A Marriage Has Been Arranged, and then to Berlin, where they gave a Shakespeare recital at the Berlin Drama Festival. Back in England they starred in the opening production of the Ashcroft Theatre, Croydon, The Royal Gambit, a play about Henry VIII and his wives, in November 1962. The stars received better notices than the play (Punch remarked "Dulcie Gray leads a team which fights an uphill struggle bravely, and clearly deserved a wittier play"). In the West End they headed the cast in a 1963 adaptation of E. M. Forster's Where Angels Fear to Tread, which ran for 262 performances. From April to July 1964 the couple toured England and Continental Europe in a Shakespeare programme called Merely Players. Without Denison, Gray guested at the Birmingham Repertory Theatre in 1964 as Arkadina in The Seagull. The critic J. C. Trewin wrote, "The study is precise in line and technique. Here are Arkadina's consuming vanity and possessiveness … a fine Chekhovian portrait".

In London Denison and Gray appeared in Wilde's An Ideal Husband at the Strand (December 1965) as Sir Robert and Lady Chiltern. They played together at the St Martin's Theatre in December 1966 in On Approval and at the Strand in October 1968 in Out of the Question with Gladys Cooper.

Between stage appearances Gray continued to write: Epitaph for a Bad Actor (1960), Murder on a Saturday (1961), Murder in Mind (1962), The Devil Wore Scarlet (1963), No Quarter for a Star (1964), The Murder of Love (1967), Died in the Red (1968) and Murder on Honeymoon (1969). The Stage commented:

All Miss Gray's books are murder stories. Some are Whodunnits, others are Howdunnits. Sometimes the reader has to try and discover who did the murder; at other times he is told and has to guess how the murderer will be discovered. In every instance, Miss Gray starts off by setting the scene and she often chooses an ugly environment because she is convinced our surroundings have a tremendous effect upon us and ugliness is capable of inspiring the deepest and vilest emotions.

In addition to her crime novels Gray collaborated with Denison on The Actor and His World (1964), aimed at young people and explaining aspects of life in the theatrical profession.

=== 1970s ===
In 1970 Gray and Denison appeared in the West End in Three – a trio of one-act plays by Shaw – and then in Ibsen's The Wild Duck, and toured in a production of Pinero's farce Dandy Dick. The following year they toured in two classic comedies – The Clandestine Marriage and The School for Scandal – as well as The Wild Duck. In 1972 Gray toured in Coward's Hay Fever. The Stage commented that audiences "were treated to a beautifully-timed and polished portrayal of Judith Bliss from Dulcie Gray".

Together with John Mills the couple starred in William Douglas-Home's Downing Street comedy At the End of the Day at the Savoy Theatre in 1973. Gray played a thinly-disguised Mary Wilson to the equally fictitious versions of Harold Wilson and Edward Heath of Mills and Denison. It ran well into 1974; Gray and Denison then appeared in a comedy, The Sack Race, in 1974. They did not act together the following year, during a substantial portion of which Gray was appearing in a thriller, The Pay Off, with Nigel Patrick and Peter Sallis. Nor did the couple appear on stage together in 1976, although Denison directed a production of Priestley's Time and the Conways in which Gray starred as Mrs Conway. On tour she appeared with Derek Nimmo in Carry On, Jeeves, adapted from stories by P. G. Wodehouse, and in Ladies in Retirement, with Evelyn Laye.

In 1977 Gray and Denison appeared together in a touring production of The Cabinet Minister, his adaptation of an 1890 comedy by Pinero, and in the West End Gray began a long-running appearance as Miss Marple in a stage version of Agatha Christie's A Murder Is Announced. After that, she was in the National Theatre's production of Alan Ayckbourn's Bedroom Farce (1978), joined in the cast by her husband later in the run.

Gray had been interested in butterflies since her childhood, and during the 1970s she researched the subject with a view to writing a book about it. Her researches took her overseas, and she became recognised as an expert on the topic. Her book Butterflies on My Mind (1978), won a Times Educational Supplement award. In addition to this book she continued to produce crime novels throughout the decade: For Richer, For Richer (1970), Deadly Lampshade (1971), Understudy to Murder (1972), Dead Give Away (1974), Ride on a Tiger (1975), Stage Door Fright (short stories, 1977), and Dark Calypso (1979).

=== 1980s ===
In the 1980s Gray and Denison toured extensively. They starred in a British tour of Douglas-Home's The Kingfisher (1980–81), and made a Middle- and Far-East tour in Ayckbourn's Relatively Speaking in 1981. Their other productions beyond the West End included The Cherry Orchard (1980) and The School for Scandal (several tours between 1982 and 1984, co-starring in one tour with Donald Sinden), in which Gray switched roles from Lady Sneerwell to Mrs Candour overnight. That production was given not only in Britain but in a ten-week tour for the British Council playing in 16 cities in nine countries. Both Gray and her husband were made CBE in 1983.

The couple played at Windsor in Fry's Venus Observed (1980) and the farce See How They Run (1986). In the West End they appeared in Ronald Millar's A Coat of Varnish, Shaw's Captain Brassbound's Conversion (1982), and Fry's Ring Round the Moon (1985 and 1988). They toured in Enid Bagnold's The Chalk Garden (1989).

Without Denison, Gray toured in Douglas-Home's comedy Lloyd George Knew My Father, co-starring with Marius Goring. The Stage commented:

Courageously playing a character at least twenty years older than herself, Dulcie Gray establishes a real personality about whose self-determined fate one genuinely cares, and her line in suppressed fury, peculiarly her own, is quite hilarious.

With her husband, Gray toured the Middle East in 1985 in Ray Cooney and John Chapman's comedy There Goes the Bride. On her return to England, Gray began filming for her first regular role in a television series. She had made one-off television appearances in every decade from the 1940s onwards, with and without Denison, but the role of Kate Harvey in the BBC series Howards' Way brought her regularly to the notice of television viewers from 1985 to 1990.

By the 1980s Gray had turned away from writing murder stories. During the decade she published three novels: The Glanville Women (1982), described as "a panoramic saga" of the lives of three generations, drawing on the author's memories of Malaya and her theatrical experiences; Anna Starr (1984), the story of a Hollywood starlet; and Mirror Image (1987), depicting the traumatic effects of an actress's obsessive love for her drama tutor.

=== Later years, 1990–2011 ===
In 1990 and 1991, Gray and Denison toured with Frank Thornton in Hugh Whitemore's The Best of Friends, depicting the friendship between the nun Laurentia McLachlan (Gray), the antiquarian Sydney Cockerell (Denison), and the playwright Bernard Shaw (Thornton). Later in 1991 Gray played the matriarch, Madame Pernelle, in Peter Hall's production of Tartuffe in the West End. On tour with Denison in The Importance of Being Earnest; she played Miss Prism and he doubled the roles of Lane and Dr Chasuble. They again appeared together in a tour of Bedroom Farce in 1992, and in the same year she published her memoirs, Looking Forward, Looking Back. In that year the couple began a long association with Hall's production of An Ideal Husband, this time in the roles of Lady Markby and Lord Caversham. The production was revived intermittently over the next five years. It opened at the Globe Theatre in 1992, toured in 1993, returned to the West End at the Haymarket and played on Broadway in 1996 (their New York débuts), and later returned to the Haymarket and was finally staged at the Gielgud Theatre in 1997. At the Chichester Festival in 1994 the couple played Colonel Pickering and Mrs Higgins in Pygmalion and Admiral and Mrs Rankling in Pinero's The Schoolmistress. At the Thorndike Theatre in the same year Denison again played Dr Chasuble in The Importance of Being Earnest but Gray switched to the role of Lady Bracknell.

Gray's last stage tour alongside her husband was in 1995, with Eric Sykes in Two of a Kind, a comedy by Hugh Janes, set in a retirement home. Their final joint appearances on stage were in March and April 1998 in Curtain Up – An Evening with Michael Denison and Dulcie Gray at the Jermyn Street Theatre.

After Denison's death, in July 1998, Gray appeared in four touring productions. She played Mrs Wilberforce opposite Tim Brooke-Taylor as Professor Marcus in a 1999 stage adaptation of the 1955 Ealing comedy The Ladykillers. The following year she toured as Madame de Rosemonde in Christopher Hampton's version of Les Liaisons dangereuses and Miss Froy in a stage adaptation of the 1938 film The Lady Vanishes. Shortly before Denison's death he had begun writing a biography of Priestley, which Gray completed; it was published in 2000. Gray made her final television appearance in 2000 in an episode of the BBC medical drama series Doctors. Her last stage appearances were in a tour of Chekhov's Three Sisters in 2002.

In her last years Gray lived at the actors' residential care home, Denville Hall, in west London, where she died on 15 November 2011 of bronchial pneumonia, aged 95.

== Cinema and television ==
=== Film ===
Year	Title	Role	Notes
1942	Banana Ridge	Bit part	uncredited
1944	Two Thousand Women	Nellie Skinner	
1944	Victory Wedding	Mary Clark	Short
1945	Madonna of the Seven Moons	Nesta Logan	
1945	A Place of One's Own	Sarah	
1945	They Were Sisters	Charlotte Lee	
1946	The Years Between	Judy	
1946	Wanted for Murder	Anne Fielding	AKA, A Voice in the Night
1947	A Man About the House	Ellen Isit	
1947	Mine Own Executioner	Patricia Milne	
1948	My Brother Jonathan	Rachel Hammond	
1949	The Glass Mountain	Anne Wilder	
1951	The Franchise Affair	Marion Sharpe	
1952	Angels One Five	Nadine Clinton	
1953	There Was a Young Lady	Elizabeth Foster	
1966	A Man Could Get Killed	Mrs Mathieson	

=== Television ===
Year	Title	Role	Notes
1949	The Will	Mrs Ross	with Denison
1949	Crime Passionel	Jessica	
1951	Milestones	Rose Sibley	with Denison
1953	Art and Opportunity	Pauline Cheverelle	
1953	A Fish in the Family	Laura	
1954	Douglas Fairbanks Presents	Margaret Brown, Alice McBain	Episodes: "A Lesson in Love", "The Happy McBains"
1954	Olympia		with Denison
1955	September Revue		
1956	The Sun Divorce		with Denison
1956	Lesson in Love		
1957	Boyd Q.C.		one episode in long-running series starring Denison
1957	The Governess	Miss Fry	TV film
1958, 1965	ITV Play of the Week	Gwendolen Fairfax, Mrs Borradaile	Episodes: "The Importance of Being Earnest", "Beautiful Forever"
1959	Theatre Night	Nancy (Duchess of Hampshire)	Episode: "Let Them Eat Cake"
1959	Sunday Night Theatre	Emily Vernon	Episode: "What the Public Wants"
1960	Winter Cruise		
1960	Somerset Maugham Hour	Leslie Crosbie	Episode: "The Letter"
1963	Where Angels Fear to Tread	Caroline Abbott	TV film
1964	East Lynne	Barbara Hare	TV film
1965	The Sullavan Brothers	Rita Dunphie	Episode: "The Outsider"
1970	ITV Playhouse	Moira Tait	Episode: "Unexpectantly Vacant"
1973	Crown Court	Stella Pickford	Episodes: "Just Good Friends: Parts 1–3"
1979	Play of the Month	Mrs Voysey	Episode: "The Voysey Inheritance"
1983	Agatha Christie's Partners in Crime	Laura Barton	Episode: "The Affair of the Pink Pearl"
1983	Rumpole of the Bailey	Lorraine Lee	Episode: "Rumpole and the Old Boy Net"
1984	Cold Warrior	Cecily Broome	Episode: "Hook, Line and Sinker"
1985–1990	Howards' Way	Kate Harvey	Main role
1987, 1989	Three Up, Two Down	Nanny Parker	Episodes: "Life and Death", "Cheltenham"
1996	Tales from the Crypt	Mrs Wilder	Episode: "Last Respects"
2000	Doctors	Paddy Grey	Episode: "On for Tonight"

== Notes, references and sources ==
=== Sources ===
- Denison, Michael (1985). Double Act. London: Michael Joseph. ISBN 978-0-7181-2290-4.
- Herbert, Ian, ed. (1972). Who's Who in the Theatre (fifteenth ed.). London: Sir Isaac Pitman and Sons. ISBN 978-0-273-31528-5.
- Parker, John, ed. (1925). Who's Who in the Theatre (fifth ed.). London: Sir Isaac Pitman and Sons. OCLC 10013159.
- Wearing, J. P. (2014). The London Stage 1950–1959: A Calendar of Productions, Performers, and Personnel (second ed.). Lanham: Rowman & Littlefield, 2015. ISBN 978-0-8108-9307-8.
