= Village Wooing (film) =

- Ad in The Age 18 Jul 1982
- Genre: comedy
- Based on: play Village Wooing by George Bernard Shaw
- Directed by: William Sterling
- Starring: Michael Denison; Dulcie Gray
- Country of origin: Australia
- Original language: English

Production
- Running time: 60 mins
- Production company: ABC

Original release
- Network: ABC
- Release: 18 July 1962 (Melbourne)
- Release: 26 September 1962 (Sydney)

Village Wooing is a 1962 Australian television play directed by William Sterling and starring Michael Denison and Dulcie Gray who were touring Australia at the time. It was based on the play by George Bernard Shaw.

It was the first Australian TV production of a play by George Bernard Shaw.

== Plot ==
In the 1930s a young woman, "Z", an assistant in a village shop, determines to marry a man, "A". she meets on an ocean liner. She fails, but the two meet again when the writer is on a walking tour going through the woman's village on Wiltshire Downs. He fails to recognise her but she suggests he buy an annuity for an elderly shop owner and take over the business. He says if he did that she could stay on as an assistant but that she could make her own matrimonial arrangements.

He buys the business, and she then tries to convince him she has wifely qualities.

== Cast ==
- Michael Denison as A
- Dulcie Gray as Z

== Production ==
In June 1962 it was announced the ABC would broadcast an adaptation of the play with Michael Denison and Duclie Gray. Denison was touring Australia at the time in a production of My Fair Lady; his wife Gray flew out to Australia at the end of June to meet him and to appear in the play (she was not in the production of My Fair Lady; her last visit to Australia had been in 1956 when she appeared in a touring production of Tea and Sympathy).

It was the first production at the ABC of a play by Shaw. It was produced in the ABC's Melbourne studios.

== Reception ==
The TV critic of The Sydney Morning Herald thought Denison "gave his part fluency and charm, bringing more poetry to the closing moments than one might have hoped for from the astringent Shaw" but thought Gray "was less suited to her role; she is the kind of English actress who cannot shed her trim upper-class charm, and her rural accent was unconvincing" and said Sterling's production was "quietly appropriate".
