= Village Wooing =

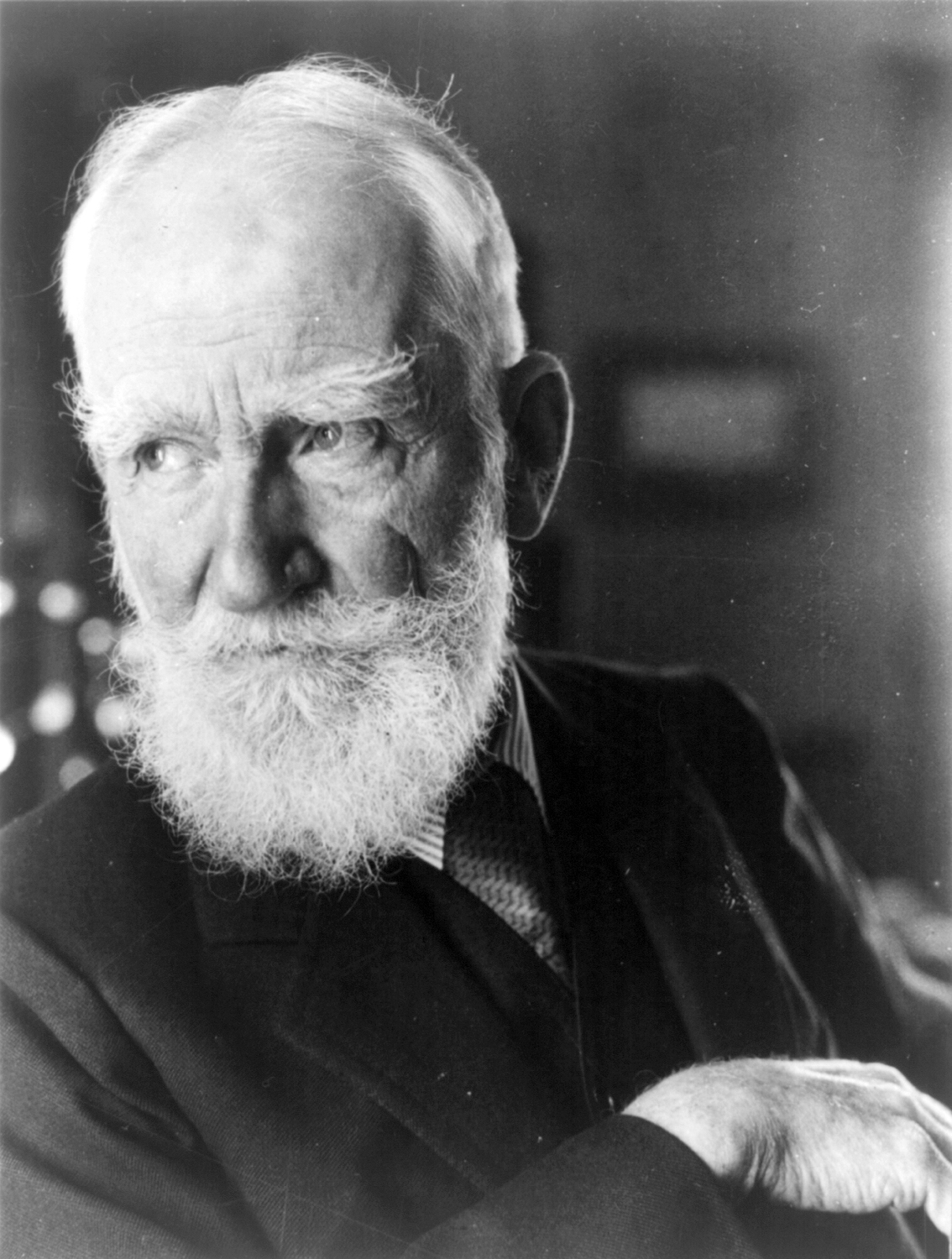
- Original language: English
- Written by: George Bernard Shaw
- Subject: an odd couple spar with one another
- Genre: satirical comedy
- Setting: A cruise liner; a village shop

Premiere
- Date: 16 April 1934
- Place: Little Theatre Company, Dallas

Village Wooing, A Comedietta for Two Voices is a play by George Bernard Shaw, written in 1933 and first performed in 1934. It has only two characters, hence the subtitle "a comedietta for two voices". The first scene takes place aboard a liner, and the second in a village shop. The characters are known only as "A" and "Z".

== Characters ==
- A, a genteel young man
- Z, a working-class young woman

== Synopsis ==
First conversation: On a cruise liner, A, an aesthetic young man, is writing. Z, a young woman, appears and tries to engage him in conversation, which he resists. He explains that he is writing about the cruise for the "Marco Polo Series of Chatty Guide Books". Z asks whether she will be included in his account of it, and replies that she will. She says she is thrilled, but must now give an account of herself, explaining that her father was a man of letters, as he was a postman.

Second conversation: In a village shop, A enters. He is served by Z, but does not recognise her. He gets into a conversation with her, and talks about having met a persistent woman on a cruise. Z asks him to tell her more about this woman. She eventually persuades him to buy the shop.

Third conversation: In the village shop again, A is now the owner of the shop, and is working on writing a checklist of reasons for staying there. Z argues with him about whether he is a shopkeeper or a poet. Eventually the pair decide they ought to be married. Z phones the church to make the arrangements. The play ends as she is about to tell the church their names.

== Productions ==
The play was first performed on 16 April 1934 in Dallas, Texas, by the Little Theatre Company. Two weeks later, on 1 May, it was produced for the first time in England by the Wells Repertory Players, at Tunbridge Wells with Christopher Fry as A. Sybil Thorndike and Arthur Wontner gave the first London performance some months later at the Little Theatre in the Adelphi.

=== Adaptations ===
Village Wooing was first shown on television in 1952 with Michael Golden as "A" and Ellen Pollock as "Z". There was an ITV version in 1979 starring Judi Dench and Richard Briers.

A Canadian production with William Hutt and Ann Morrish was broadcast in July 1961 and April 1962. There was also an Australian version filmed for TV in 1962 starring Michael Denison and Dulcie Gray.

The SHAW2020 theatre company produced Village Wooing in 2021/22. It won a 'Standing Ovation' award from London Pub Theatres Magazine, 'Best Show' (nominee: Jonas Cemm), and 'Best Performance' (nominee: Maryann O'Brien) at The Birmingham Fringe Festival and was a finalist for an OffFest award at The Offies in 2022. Judi Dench said, "It’s wonderful to see SHAW2020 continue to thrive as shown by this industry recognition. I wish their production continued success."

== Origin ==
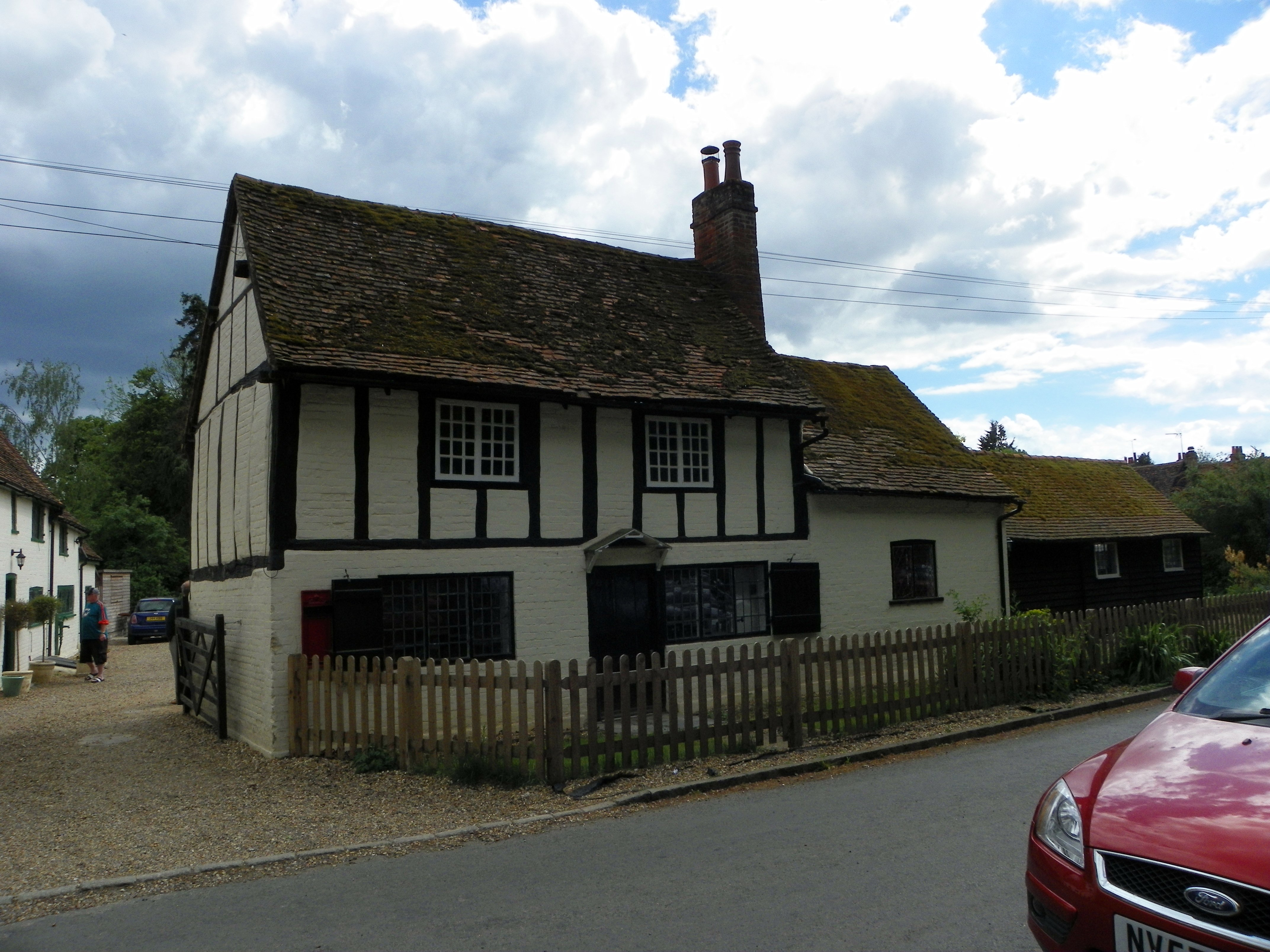
The cottage in Ayot St Lawrence that was the setting for Village Wooing

Shaw was not very impressed with his play, which he wrote while on a cruise. He wrote a letter to his friend Blanche Patch saying "Tell Barry Jackson -- but no one else -- that my efforts to write resulted in nothing at first but a very trivial comedietta in three scenes for two people which only Edith Evans could make tolerable." Patch suggests that the play was influenced by his own experiences on the cruise and that the character of Z was based on Mrs. Jisbella Lyth, the postmistress in Shaw's village, Ayot St Lawrence. In a letter to Lillah McCarthy Shaw said that the male character was a "posthumous portrait" of Lytton Strachey.

Mrs Lyth later commented that she went to see the play when she was told she'd inspired it, but she much preferred a play by John Galsworthy that was shown with it in a double-bill, ,

I was supposed to have inspired him for this play, but I don't know when he ever saw me wooing anybody! ...At that time I ran a café here, in addition to my duties as postmistress, and Mrs Arthur Wontner and her children came in one day for tea. She said, 'You're the lady who inspired G.B.S. for the play, and you must go up and see it'--so I did. Following it in the same programme was one of Galsworthy's plays called The Little Man, which I enjoyed much more than Village Wooing. I don't say Mr Shaw's aren't good plays, but I think they lack suspense. In spite of that, I wrote and congratulated Dame Sybil Thorndike on her wonderful portrayal of a postmistress in a little village shop. She autographed her picture for me and wrote on the back that she was most interested to know that she had been playing me, and would come and see me one day.

Shaw's friend Archibald Henderson agrees that the action in the village shop cum post-office was inspired by Shaw's experiences with Mrs. Lyth, but thinks the character of Z was mainly based on Shaw's wife Charlotte Payne-Townshend,

Like Charlotte, "Z" is an adventurous uninhibited young woman of the new dispensation, who knows what she wants, is breezily amusing in her frankness; and after "A" has come like a homing pigeon to the village and purchased the shop, plucks him like a daisy, as did Charlotte, who, as we recall, purchased the marriage license...The vision of marriage drawn by "A" is memorable as a literary facsimile of the "marital compact" for the fin de siecle union of the Shaws. The "romance" of the marriage of "A" and "Z" reveals consummation, not as mere sensual gratification of the senses, but as a mystic rite of sublimation, in the discovery of life's aesthetic magic and wonder.

== Critical views ==
Critic John Bertolini sees the play as an allegory of the relation between writer and text, "In Village Wooing Shaw dramatizes his own creative process as a writer of comedies, by figuring the subject of comedy, courtship and marriage, as the marriage of writer and text." The marriage at the end is "the paradigmatic one of all written comedy, hence the play is the closed circle of its writing and reading."
