= Angels One Five =

1952 film by George More O'Ferrall

- DVD cover
- Directed by: George More O'Ferrall
- Written by: Pelham Groom (story); Derek Twist
- Produced by: John W. Gossage; Derek Twist
- Starring: Jack Hawkins; Michael Denison; Dulcie Gray; John Gregson
- Cinematography: Christopher Challis
- Edited by: Daniel Birt
- Music by: John Wooldridge
- Production company: Templar Productions
- Distributed by: Associated British-Pathé
- Release date: 19 March 1952
- Running time: 98 minutes
- Country: United Kingdom
- Language: English
- Budget: £143,222
- Box office: £258,199 (UK)

Angels One Five is a 1952 British war film directed by George More O'Ferrall and starring Jack Hawkins, Michael Denison, Dulcie Gray, John Gregson, Cyril Raymond and Veronica Hurst. Based on the book What Are Your Angels Now? by Pelham Groom (who was also technical adviser to the film under his full title of W/Cdr. A. J. C. Pelham Groom), the plot centres on a young fighter pilot immediately before and during the Battle of Britain in the Second World War. Some scenes in the film were shot at RAF Uxbridge, where there was a wartime operations room.

"Angels One Five" refers to RAF radio procedure from the Second World War. Angels stands for altitude. One Five means 15,000 feet. The film was the first British post-war production to deal with the Battle of Britain.

== Plot ==
In 1940, a newly qualified pilot, Pilot Officer T. B. "Septic" (Note: The initials 'TB' would have been instantly recognised by audiences as the common abbreviation for Tuberculosis, an infectious disease very prevalent at that time, now mostly controlled by antibiotics and much less common) Baird (John Gregson), is delivering a replacement Hawker Hurricane (and himself) to "Pimpernel" Squadron's airfield. Just as he touches down, another Hurricane, damaged in combat, lands across his path. Septic's quick reactions allow him to leapfrog the other Hurricane, averting a collision, but he is then unable to slow his own aircraft in time and crashes his brand new aircraft into the garden of a bungalow belonging to Squadron Leader Barry Clinton.

This earns Septic the wrath of his new squadron leader, Bill Ponsford, because he damaged a replacement aircraft. The crash also injures the ligaments in Septic's neck, which he is able to self-diagnose, since he was studying medicine before the war. The next morning Septic is told by Group Captain "Tiger" Small that he will not be able to fly until his neck is healed, so he will instead serve in the operations room.

Several days later, with the risk of a bombing raid on the airfield and all of Pimpernel Squadron's Hurricanes scrambled, Tiger orders all aircraft to take off and fly out of harm's way until the raid is over. With Tiger quickly assembling all available pilots and finding aircraft to fly, Septic wins a foot race with Small to claim the last spare Hurricane for himself. He then proceeds to shoot down a Messerschmitt Bf 110 from the attacking force. His delight is short-lived when he is admonished by Small and Sqn Ldr Peter Moon for leaving his radio set on transmit, preventing the returning Hurricanes from being warned to divert to an undamaged airfield. A crestfallen Septic returns to his ground duties.

Eventually, a reinstated Septic joins in Pimpernel's operations but he is mortally wounded while shooting down a German aircraft. His last words are heard over the Sector control room tannoy, when he tells Small that their planned return foot race (intended to prove whether or not Small could have beaten him to the spare Hurricane) will have to be "postponed indefinitely". Small replies "Your message received and understood. Out". The final shot is of Squadron Leader Clinton's wife Nadine hanging an oil lamp in the ruins of their bungalow to aid returning pilots.

== Cast ==
- Jack Hawkins as Group Captain 'Tiger' Small
- Michael Denison as Squadron Leader Peter Moon
- Andrew Osborn as Squadron Leader Bill Ponsford
- Cyril Raymond as Squadron Leader Barry Clinton
- Humphrey Lestocq as Flight Lieutenant "Batchy" Salter
- John Gregson as Pilot Officer 'Septic' Baird
- Ronald Adam as Group Controller
- Dulcie Gray as Nadine Clinton
- Veronica Hurst as Betty Carfax
- Amy Veness as Aunt Tabitha
- Philip Stainton as Police Constable
- Russell Hunter as Raines - Pimpernel Pilot
- Terence Longdon as Falk - Pimpernel Pilot
- Harold Siddons as Mortimer - Pimpernel Pilot
- Norman Pierce as 'Bonzo'
- Gordon Bell as "Ops B"
- Rosemary Lomax as "Ops A"
- Vida Hope as W.A.A.F.
- Ann Lancaster as W.A.A.F.
- Joan Sterndale-Bennett as W.A.A.F.
- Colin Tapley as Adjutant
- John Sharp as 'Soss'
- Ewan Roberts as Medical Officer
- Hugh Moxey as Intelligence Officer
- John Phillips as Engineering Officer
- John Harvey as SWO (Station Warrant Officer)
- Harold Goodwin as A.C. 2 Wailes
- Geoffrey Keen as Company Sergeant Major (Army Guard Section)
- Harry Locke as Look Out
- Sam Kydd as Mess Waiter
- Peter Jones as Operations Room Sentry
- Harry Fowler as Airman
- Russell Waters as Airman
- Victor Maddern as Airman

== Production ==
The film was financed by the Elstree Group a financing scheme that operated for British films made by Associated British Pictures Corporation in the early 1950s. Associated British would make movies with part of the finance being provided by the National Film Finance Corporation.

Angels One Five featured a number of Hawker Hurricane fighter aircraft, with at least six airworthy examples, plus several others only used for static shots. Known aircraft include: Hurricane Mk.Is (L1592 and P2617) and Mk.IIc (LF363) on loan from the RAF Air Historical Branch, Hurricane Mk IIc (PZ865) lent by Hawker Aircraft, plus an additional five Hurricane Mk.IIc aircraft (numbers 544, 554, 600, 601, 624) from the Portuguese Air Force, which were still flying this type operationally until mid-1954. The aircraft were all painted in the colours of No. 56 Squadron RAF and were based at RAF Kenley during the filming. The Squadron letters of No 56 Squadron were 'US'. A number of Hurricanes seen in the film carried the squadron letters 'AV', the letters of No 121, the second American Eagle squadron. Other RAF types seen in the background include North American Harvard training aircraft, Avro Anson and Supermarine Spitfire. The enemy aircraft were represented by a captured Messerschmitt Bf 110 G4 from the "German Force Aircraft Equipment Centre", RAF Stanmore Park. It was scrapped after filming in 1952. Other enemy aircraft were depicted by models.

Ronald Adam, who plays the part of a Group Controller, was the Fighter Group Controller at RAF Hornchurch during the Battle of Britain. Squadron Leader Adam was a veteran of both the First and Second World Wars.

Kenneth More desperately wanted to play the role of Batchy but was unable to as he had signed to make Appointment with Venus.

Michael Denison said he had "a reasonable though not particularly exciting part" but considered the film a let-down as his wife, Dulcie, “was persuaded to accept a small part on the understanding that a scene would be added which would enable her, as a service wife, to do for the RAF what Celia Johnson did so memorably for the Navy in Noël Coward's In Which We Serve. The promise was honoured, to the extent that the scene was written and shot, and very moving it was. It was then however cut entirely, on the grounds that the film was overlength."

== Music ==
The opening titles feature the "Royal Air Force March Past" composed by Sir Henry Walford Davies KCVO OBE.

== Reception ==
=== Box office ===
Angels One Five was the ninth most popular at the British box office in 1952.

Jack Hawkins later wrote, "This proved to be the part that set my feet on the road—I don't know whether I altogether care for the road—leading to a whole series of service character parts. Over the next few years, I played enough senior officers to stock the whole Ministry of Defence."

=== Critical response ===
Film critic Bosley Crowther, in his review for The New York Times, wrote that "there's something about any picture that recollects the R.A.F. and the triumphant Battle of Britain that this reviewer finds hard to resist. Maybe it's all those brave young pilots; maybe it's the climate of the operations rooms; maybe it's those Hurricanes and Spitfires barreling down the runways and clawing into the sky. The symbols of that kind of warfare and that phase of World War II are so heroically connected that they invariably stir a thrill. And one must say that this picture has a cast to do it proud."

Aviation film historian Stephen Pendo remarked, ""Septic" Baird (John Gregson) and "Tiger" Small (Jack Hawkins)... play their roles with a reasonable degree of expertise."
