= Joseph Janni =

Italian-born British film producer (1916–1994)

- Born: 21 May 1916; Milan, Kingdom of Italy
- Died: 29 May 1994 (aged 78); London, England
- Education: Centro Sperimentale di Cinematografia
- Spouse: Stella Griffiths (m. 1949)

Joseph Janni (21 May 1916 – 29 May 1994) was a Jewish Italian-British film producer best known for his work with John Schlesinger. He was born in Milan, Italy and became interested in filmmaking while at university.

He emigrated to England in 1939, and once Italy declared war, he was briefly interned in Metropole Camp on the Isle of Man. Returning to London, he worked with John Corfield.

Janni's success with The Glass Mountain brought him work with the Rank Organisation. Janni made the popular Town Like Alice with Jack Lee and Peter Finch and the three men were reunited on Robbery Under Arms.

Janni went on to produce the first films of John Schlesinger and Ken Loach. Many of these were financed by Nat Cohen.

== Selected filmography ==
- Headline (1944)
- The Glass Mountain (1949)
- The Woman in Question (1950)
- White Corridors (1951)
- Honeymoon Deferred (1951)
- Something Money Can't Buy (1952)
- Romeo and Juliet (1954)
- A Town Like Alice (1956)
- Robbery Under Arms (1957)
- The Captain's Table (1958)
- The Savage Innocents (1962)
- A Kind of Loving (1962)
- Billy Liar (1963)
- Darling (1965)
- Modesty Blaise (1966)
- Far from the Madding Crowd (1967)
- Poor Cow (1967)
- In Search of Gregory (1969)
- Sunday Bloody Sunday (1971)
- Made (1972)
- Los Amigos (1973)
- Yanks (1979)
