= Invitation to the Castle =

1947 play written by Jean Anouilh

- Original language: French
- Written by: Jean Anouilh
- Characters: Madame Desmermortes; Diana Messerschmann; Lady Dorothy India; Frédéric; Geraldine Capulat; Guy-Charles Romainville; Horace; Isabelle; Joshua; Mother (Josephine); Patrice Bombelles; Romuald Messerschmann
- Genre: Comedy
- Setting: A glamorous society ball in 1950s France

Premiere
- Date: 5 November 1947
- Place: Theatre de l'Atelier, Paris

Invitation to the Castle (French: L'Invitation au château) is a 1947 satirical play by the French playwright Jean Anouilh. It was adapted in 1950 by Christopher Fry as Ring Round the Moon. The play concerns twins, a cold, manipulative playboy Horace, and his sensitive brother Frédéric. Frédéric is madly in love with Diana, the spoiled daughter of a self-made millionaire. She herself wants Horace, as his impenetrability teases her. To show to Frédéric that Diana is not worth his attentions, Horace invites to a ball Isabelle, a lower-class dancer, whom he Pygmalion-like transforms into an aristocratic beauty.

== Characters ==
- Madame Desmortes – The elderly matriarch of the family, she owns the château where the ball is taking place. She is aunt to Hugo, Frederic, and Lady India. Mme. Desmortes comes from old money and possibly aristocracy – she certainly behaves as if she does, but we cannot be sure – for after the Revolution(s), all sorts of people became aristocracy. She may be quite old, but she is alert and very bright. She is easily a match for Hugo and loves a good fight. Rank, roots, and pedigree are everything to her (appearances are all important). She has enjoyed a life of ease and some adventure.
- Diana Messerschmann – The extremely spoiled daughter of a self-made millionaire, her deprived and haunted childhood made her tough as nails. She is not altogether a nice person, but true sadness exists in how little everything she has means to her and how much she defines herself by her wealth. A frightened little girl is lurking inside her. She is in love with Hugo, but is settling for Frederic.
- Lady Dorothy India – Lady India is Madame Desmortes’ niece. It is unclear where her title comes from (former husband, father, made up?), but she has returned to France from England (where she apparently met Messerschmann). She is related to Mme. Desmortes through the Fitzroys. Her origins do not really matter at this point. What does matter is that she allows Messerschmann to support her in lavish style, while she carries on with his secretary, Patrice. She is self-centered, capricious, highly energetic, and imaginative, and loves living on the edge.
- Frédéric – As Hugo's identical twin, where Hugo is arrogant and pro-active, Frederic is a romantic dreamer. He is head-over-heels in love with Diana (like Shakespeare's Romeo – in love with love), with whom he is about to be engaged. Diana did a very good job landing him.
- Geraldine Capulet – Capulet is Mme. Desmortes’ long-suffering companion. She is probably also her eyes and ears to everything that happens in the château. Capulet lives happily in a fantasy world of romance and forgotten dreams. She tends to be highly emotional. She straddles the world of servants and mistress.
- Guy-Charles Romainville – A middle-aged self-proclaimed patron of the arts, Romainville has taken Isabelle under his wing, presumably to make her his mistress. For now, he is still flirting around the edges and negotiating with her mother. Clearly a novice at these transactions, he has been caught by Hugo, who is now blackmailing him to cooperate with his "charade". Romainville is of reasonable enough background to be welcomed regularly into Mme. Desmortes’ château and circle and very worried about losing that acceptance.
- Hugo – Nephew of Mme. Desmortes, he is self-assured, handsome, and manipulative. Hugo believes he has the right and the ability to organize people's lives (including his own). He is not completely honest with himself. He is in love with Diana, however much he tries to deny it. He cannot admit he loves her because her wealth far exceeds his own. He is competitive and inventive. He plays for keeps and is unscrupulous.
- Isabelle – A ballet dancer with the opera company in Paris, she is innocent, but certainly not ignorant, and life's struggles have made her tough. She tolerates her mother's schemes for her, but ultimately she will go her own way. Isabelle is not at all impressed by wealth or power. She is sensitive and susceptible to romance.
- Joshua – Joshua is an old-style faithful family retainer. He is a stickler for position and appearance. Like all good butlers, he sees all and says little, except for philosophical and helpful observations. He seems fatherly to the twins, having known them from birth. He does, however, preserve a ranking distinction of Hugo as the older brother and Frederic as the younger.
- Mother (Josephine) – Isabelle's mother, she is a disappointed woman whose early romantic fling resulted in Isabelle. She teaches piano and lives in a world of past romance, pretensions, and dreams of the future, an optimist.
- Patrice Bombelles – Messerschmann's secretary, Patrice comes from a good family, but is evidently now completely dependent on the income provided by Messerschmann. This makes his fling with Lady India all the more daring. He is not particularly brave or self-reliant. He has splendid clothing and manners.
- Romuald Messerschmann – A self-made millionaire, a Jewish tailor from Cracow, he escaped to Paris and made it big, very big in business. He is all about business and power. His money has not made him at all happy. He does not, or cannot, eat anything but plain noodles (no butter, no salt). He keeps a mistress, Lady India, but knows perfectly well she does not love or respect him. He is not awed by rank, honours, or old money.

== Production history ==
The play was first presented on 5 November 1947 at the Théâtre de l'Atelier, Paris. The production was directed by Peter Brook. The first production on Broadway, in 1950, starred Denholm Elliott and Stella Andrew.

== Chamber suite ==
The French composer Francis Poulenc wrote a chamber suite on Invitation to the Castle.
