= Ring Round the Moon =

1950 play adapted by Christopher Fry

- Written by: Christopher Fry
- Characters: Madame Desmortes; Diana Messerschmann; Lady Dorothy India; Frédéric; Geraldine Capulet; Guy-Charles Romainville; Hugo; Isabelle; Joshua; Mother (Josephine); Patrice Bombelles; Romuald Messerschmann
- Original language: English
- Genre: Comedy
- Setting: A glamorous society ball in 1950s France

Premiere
- Place premiered: Globe Theatre
- Official website

Ring Round the Moon is a 1950 adaptation by the English dramatist Christopher Fry of Jean Anouilh's Invitation to the Castle (1947). Peter Brook commissioned Fry to adapt the play and the first production of Ring Round the Moon was given at the Globe Theatre. The production starred Paul Scofield, Claire Bloom and Margaret Rutherford.

== Notable productions ==
- A West End production of Ring Round the Moon was given at the Theatre Royal Haymarket starring John Standing as the twins and Angela Thorne as Diana in 1967.
- A production was given in 1975 at the Center Theatre Group in Los Angeles, directed by Joseph Hardy and starring:

- Glynis Johns - Madam Desmermortes
- Michael York - Hugo/Frédéric
- Kitty Winn - Isabelle

- Steven Pimlott directed a production at the Royal Exchange, Manchester in 1983.
- The play was revived on Broadway in 1999 and starred Toby Stephens.
- The most recent West End production opened on 19 February 2008 at the Playhouse Theatre. The production, presented by Karl Sydow, and Act Productions, was directed by Sean Mathias with design by Colin Richmond and starred:

- Emily Bruni - Lady Dorothy India
- Fiona Button / Lindsay Armaou - Isabelle
- Joanna David - Geraldine Capulet
- Elisabeth Dermot-Walsh - Diana Messerschmann
- Peter Eyre - Joshua
- JJ Feild - Hugo/Frédéric
- Andrew Havill - Patrice Bombelles
- Belinda Lang - Mother (Josephine)
- Leigh Lawson - Romuald Messerschmann
- John Ramm - Guy-Charles Romainville
- Angela Thorne - Madame Desmersmortes

Music was composed by Jason Carr, and Wayne McGregor was movement director. Lighting was designed by Mark Henderson, and sound was designed by Gregory Clarke.
