= Christopher Fry =

English poet and playwright (1907–2005)

- Fry in 1950
- Born: Arthur Hammond Harris; 18 December 1907; Bristol, England
- Died: 30 June 2005 (aged 97); Chichester, England
- Education: Bedford Modern School
- Occupations: Playwright; screenwriter; translator; critic
- Spouse: Phyllis Marjorie Hart Fry (1936–1987)
- Writing career
- Notable work: The Lady's Not for Burning (1948)

Christopher Fry (born Arthur Hammond Harris; 18 December 1907 – 30 June 2005) was an English poet and playwright. He is best known for his verse dramas, especially The Lady's Not for Burning (1948), which made him a major force in theatre in the 1940s and 1950s.

== Biography ==
=== Early life ===
Fry was born as Arthur Hammond Harris in Bristol, the son of Charles John Harris, a master builder who retired early to work full-time as a licensed Lay Reader in the Church of England, and his wife Emma Marguerite Fry Hammond Harris. While still young, he took his mother's maiden name because, on very tenuous grounds, he believed her to be related to the 19th-century Quaker prison reformer Elizabeth Fry. He adopted Elizabeth Fry's faith, and became a Quaker.

After attending Bedford Modern School, where he wrote amateur plays, he became a schoolteacher, working at the Bedford Froebel Kindergarten and Hazelwood School in Limpsfield, Surrey.

In the 1920s, he met the writer Robert Gittings, who became a lifelong friend.

=== Career ===
Fry gave up his school career in 1932 to found the Tunbridge Wells Repertory Players, which he ran for three years, directing and starring in the English premiere of George Bernard Shaw's A Village Wooing in 1934. As a curtain-raiser, he put on a revised version of a show he wrote when he was a schoolboy called The Peregrines. He also wrote the music for She Shall Have Music in 1935.

His play about Thomas John Barnardo, the founder of Barnardo's children's homes, toured in a fund-raising amateur production in 1935 and 1936. It included Deborah Kerr in its cast.

His professional career began to take off in 1938, when he was commissioned by the vicar of Steyning, West Sussex, to write a play celebrating the local saint, Cuthman of Steyning. This became The Boy With A Cart. It would be put on professionally in 1950 at the Lyric, Hammersmith, with John Gielgud directing and the young Richard Burton in his first starring role.

Tewkesbury Abbey commissioned his next play, The Tower, written in 1939, which was seen by the poet T. S. Eliot, who became a friend and is often cited as an influence. In 1939 Fry also became artistic director of Oxford Playhouse.

A pacifist, he was a conscientious objector during World War II, and served in the Non-Combatant Corps; for part of the time he cleaned London's sewers.

After the War, he wrote a comedy, A Phoenix Too Frequent, which was produced at the Mercury Theatre, Notting Hill Gate, and revived at the Arts Theatre London, in 1946, starring Paul Scofield, Hermione Hannen, and Joan White. The show is a comedy that is based upon Petronius's tale of the Ephesian widow, the false heroics of Dynamene's mourning of her husband in his tomb, and her reawakening to the joy of life by a handsome officer who enters the tomb to rest on a course of duty.

The Firstborn was produced at the Oxford Playhouse in 1948. The plot is that of Egypt in the throes of a threatening conflict between master and slave, with Moses denouncing his privileges as an Egyptian-reared soldier and finding new responsibility as a leader of his people. The play was produced by actress Katharine Cornell and featured two songs specially written for the play by Leonard Bernstein.

In 1948, Fry wrote a commission for the Canterbury Festival, Thor, With Angels.

=== Major works ===
Fry was then commissioned to write a play by Alec Clunes, manager of the Arts Theatre in London. The result, The Lady's Not for Burning, was first performed there in 1948, directed by the actor Jack Hawkins. Due to its success, it transferred to the West End for a nine-month run, starring John Gielgud and featuring Richard Burton and Claire Bloom among the cast. It was presented on Broadway in 1950, again with Burton. The play marked a revival in popularity for poetic drama, most notably espoused by T. S. Eliot. It is the most performed of all his plays and inspired British Prime Minister Margaret Thatcher to declaim, "You turn if you want to — the lady's not for turning," at the Conservative Party conference in 1980.

In 1950, Fry adapted a translation of Jean Anouilh's Invitation to the Castle as Ring Round the Moon for director Peter Brook. He also wrote Venus Observed, which was produced at the St James's Theatre by Laurence Olivier. A Sleep of Prisoners followed in 1951, first performed at St Thomas' church in Regent Street, London, in 1951 and later touring with Denholm Elliott and Stanley Baker.

The Dark is Light Enough, a winter play starring Katharine Cornell and Edith Evans in 1954, was third in a quartet of "seasonal" plays, featured incidental music written by Leonard Bernstein. The production also featured Tyrone Power, Lorne Greene and Marian Winters. Christopher Plummer had an understudy role that he wrote about in his memoir. This play followed the springtime of The Lady's Not For Burning and the autumnal Venus Observed. The quartet was completed in 1970 with A Yard Of Sun, representing summer, presented at the Nottingham Playhouse in 1970.

His next plays were translations from French dramatists: The Lark, an adaptation of Jean Anouilh's L'Alouette ("The Lark"), in 1955; Tiger At The Gates, based on Jean Giraudoux's La guerre de Troie n'aura pas lieu, also in 1955; Duel of Angels, adapted from Giraudoux's Pour Lucrèce, in 1960; and Judith, also by Giraudoux, in 1962.

Although Fry lived until 2005, his poetic style of drama began to fall out of fashion with the advent of the Angry Young Men of British theatre in the mid-1950s. Despite working mainly for the cinema in the 1960s, including scripts for Ben Hur, Barabbas, and The Bible: In the Beginning..., he continued to write plays, including Curtmantle for the Royal Shakespeare Company (1961).

Curtmantle's plot deals with Henry II of England and his conflict with Thomas Becket. A Yard of Sun (1970) is set just after World War II at the time of the famous annual horse race Palio di Siena in the streets of Siena.

After the success of his post-war plays Fry bought Trebinshwn, a fine Regency house in Breconshire. When living there he used to walk over the hill behind the house, the Allt, to Llansantffraed church, where the 17th-century poet Henry Vaughan is buried; Vaughan's poetry was a strong influence on him.

During the next ten years, Fry concentrated on further translations, including Henrik Ibsen's Peer Gynt and Edmond Rostand's Cyrano de Bergerac, which were produced at the Chichester Festival Theatre.

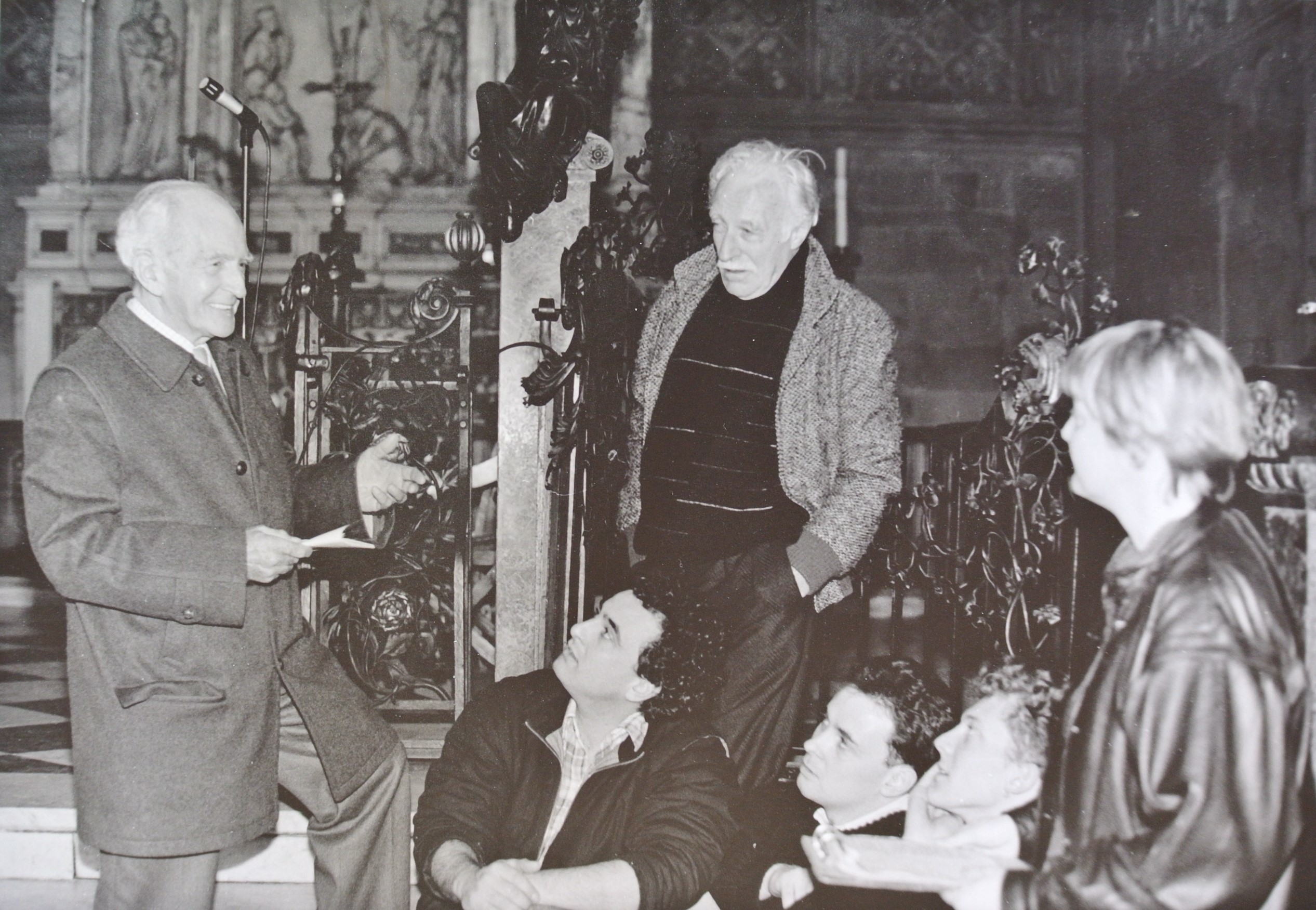
Fry (left) at a rehearsal of a revival of A Sleep of Prisoners by the Next Stage Company, Holy Trinity Church, Sloane Square, November 1987

In 1986, he wrote One Thing More, a play about the seventh-century Northumbrian monk Cædmon who was suddenly given the gift of composing song; The play was first broadcast on BBC radio, and then performed by the Next Stage Company directed by Joan White at Chelsea Old Church, November 1988, and at Whitby Abbey in Yorkshire, June 1989. Further productions followed in London and Oxford.

His last play, A Ringing Of Bells, was commissioned by his old school, Bedford Modern School, and performed there in 2000. The following year, a new production was performed at the National Theatre.

In later life Fry lived in the village of East Dean in West Sussex, and died, from natural causes, in Chichester in 2005. His wife, Phyllis, whom he married in 1936, died in 1987. He was survived by their son, Tam.

=== Revivals ===
Revivals of his plays include a staged reading of The Lady's Not For Burning at the National Theatre in 2001 as one of the 100 best plays of the 20th century, with actors Alex Jennings, Prunella Scales and Samuel West. West went on to produce The Lady’s Not For Burning at Chichester Festival Theatre's Minerva Theatre in 2002 with Nancy Carroll, Alan Cox and Benjamin Whitrow. In 2007, it was performed in a new production at the Finborough Theatre, London.

Ring Round The Moon was revived at the Theatre Royal Haymarket 1967-68. starring John Standing and Angela Thorne. In 2008, it was revived again, directed by Sean Mathias, once again starring Angela Thorne, graduating from the role of young Diana to the wheelchair-using Madame Desmortes. Other cast members included JJ Feild, Joanna David, Belinda Lang, John Ramm and Leigh Lawson.

=== Legacy ===
In commemoration of his achievements, Bedford Modern School named the new Junior School hall after him.

== Bibliography ==
=== Film and TV writing ===
Beginning in the 1950s, many of Fry's plays were adapted for the screen, mainly television. A version of The Lady's Not For Burning was produced by Yorkshire Television, starring Kenneth Branagh, in 1987.

Fry collaborated with Denis Cannan on a screenplay for the film version of John Gay's The Beggar's Opera (1953), for director Peter Brook, starring Laurence Olivier. He was also one of the writers of the film, Ben-Hur (1959), directed by William Wyler. But he was uncredited for his efforts on Ben Hur, as was Gore Vidal. The sole writing credit and Academy Award nomination instead went to Karl Tunberg. He collaborated on other screenplays including Barabbas (1961), which starred Anthony Quinn, and The Bible: In the Beginning (1966), directed by John Huston. Other screenplays include the documentary The Queen Is Crowned (1953).

His television movie scripts are The Canary (1950), The Tenant of Wildfell Hall (1968), The Brontës of Haworth (1973), The Best of Enemies (1976), Sister Dora (1977), and Star Over Bethlehem (1981).

=== Works ===
- She Shall Have Music (1934), with Monte Crick and F. Eyton
- Open Door (1936)
- The Boy With a Cart (1938)
- Robert of Sicily: Opera for Children (1938), music by Michael Tippett
- Seven at One Stroke: A Play for Children (1939), music by Michael Tippett
- The Tower (1939)
- Thursday's Child (1939), music by Martin Shaw
- A Phoenix Too Frequent (1946)
- The Firstborn (1946)
- The Lady's Not for Burning (1948)
- Thor, With Angels (1948)
- Venus Observed (1950)
- Ring Round the Moon (1950), adapted from Jean Anouilh's L'Invitation au Château
- A Winter's Tale (1951) music by Fry with arrangements by Leslie Bridgewater
- A Sleep of Prisoners (1951)
- The Dark is Light Enough (1954)
- The Lark (1955), adapted from Jean Anouilh's play
- Tiger At The Gates (1956), adapted from Jean Giraudoux's play
- Crown of the Year (1958), music by Michael Tippett
- Duel of Angels (1958), adapted from Jean Giraudoux's play Pour Lucrèce
- Curtmantle (1961)
- Judith (1962), adapted from Jean Giraudoux's play
- The Boy and the Magic (1964), adapted from Colette's play
- Peer Gynt (1970), based on Johan Fillinger's translation of Henrik Ibsen's play
- A Yard of Sun (1970)
- Cyrano de Bergerac (1975), adapted from Edmond Rostand's play
- Can You Find Me: A Family History (1979)
- One Thing More (or Caedmon Construed) (1986)
- A Ringing of Bells (2001)

== Awards ==
- 1948: Shaw Prize Fund for The Lady's Not for Burning
- 1951: William Foyle Poetry Prize for Venus Observed
- 1951: New York Drama Critics Circle Award for The Lady's Not for Burning
- 1952: New York Drama Critics Circle Award for Venus Observed
- 1956: New York Drama Critics Circle Award for The Tiger At The Gates
- 1956: Tony Award nomination for The Tiger At The Gates
- 1962: Queen's Gold Medal for Poetry
- 1962: Heinemann Award, Royal Society of Literature for Curmantle
- 1966: Doctor of Arts from Manchester Metropolitan University
- 1971: Writers Guild Best British Television Dramatization award nomination for The Tenant of Wildfell Hall
- 1987: Doctor of Letters from Oxford University
- 1988: Honorary Fellow of Manchester Metropolitan University
- 1994: Doctor of Letters from De Montfort University
- 1994: Doctor of Letters from University of Sussex
- 2000: Benson Medal Fellow and Recipient

== Quotes ==
Try thinking of love, or something. Amor vincit insomnia.

— Christopher Fry, A Sleep of Prisoners

Life is a hypocrite if I can't live
The way it moves me!

— Christopher Fry, A Sleep of Prisoners

If this is less than your best, then never, in my presence,
Be more than your less: never!

— Christopher Fry, A Phoenix Too Frequent
