= Queen Elizabeth Slept Here =

1949 play

- Written by: Talbot Rothwell
- Original language: English
- Genre: Comedy
- Setting: Buckinghamshire, England

Premiere
- Date premiered: 3 November 1949
- Place premiered: Strand Theatre in London

Queen Elizabeth Slept Here is a comedy play by the British writer Talbot Rothwell. It was inspired by Moss Hart and George S. Kaufman's 1940 Broadway play George Washington Slept Here, with the setting switched to England and many alterations to the plot and characters. The story takes place at an Elizabeth era cottage in Buckinghamshire.

A hit, it ran for 349 performances at the Strand Theatre in London's West End between 3 November 1949 and 2 September 1950. The original West End cast starred Dulcie Gray, Michael Denison and also included Kenneth Connor and Julien Mitchell. Later on in the run the lead roles were taken over by Rosalyn Boulter and Jimmy Hanley. Direction was by Richard Bird

Rothwell was emerging at the time as a popular writer, and later became known for his scripts for the Carry On film series.

== Bibliography ==
- Monk, Claire & Sargeant, Amy. British Historical Cinema. Routledge, 2015.
- Wearing, J.P. The London Stage 1950-1959: A Calendar of Productions, Performers, and Personnel. Rowman & Littlefield, 2014.
