= Contraband Spain =

1955 British film by Lawrence Huntington

- UK theatrical poster
- Directed by: Lawrence Huntington; Julio Salvador
- Written by: Lawrence Huntington
- Based on: a story by Lawrence Huntington
- Produced by: Ernest Gartside
- Starring: Richard Greene; Anouk Aimée; Michael Denison
- Cinematography: Harry Waxman
- Edited by: Tom Simpson
- Music by: Edwin Astley
- Production companies: Balcázar Producciones Cinematográficas; Diadem Films
- Distributed by: Associated British-Pathé (UK)
- Release date: 15 March 1955 (London)
- Running time: 78 minutes
- Country: United Kingdom
- Language: English

Contraband Spain (also known as Contrabando.) is a 1955 British crime film directed by Lawrence Huntington and Josep María Forn and starring Richard Greene, Anouk Aimée and Michael Denison. It was written by Huntington.

== Plot ==
A United States Department of the Treasury agent works against smugglers on the border between Spain and France. He has a personal interest as his brother who was part of the gang was murdered by them. The gang smuggles watches into Spain and brings counterfeit American money into England that is used to buy gold that is melted down and shipped to Continental Europe.

== Cast ==
- Richard Greene as Lee Scott
- Anouk Aimée as Elena Vargas
- Michael Denison as Ricky Metcalfe
- José Nieto as Pierre
- Robert Ayres as Mr. Dean
- Richard Warner as Inspector LeGrand
- John Warwick as Bryant
- Philip Saville as Martin Scott
- Alfonso Estela as Henchman
- Conrado San Martín as Henchman
- Antonio Almorós as Lucien Remue
- G. H. Mulcaster as Colonel Ingleby

Christopher Lee provides uncredited narration in the film.

== Locations ==
The film features locations in Barcelona, including La Rambla in the opening images. Later, when Richard Greene follows the villains (both travelling in taxis), they get out in Plaza Real with its arcaded pavements. The seaside town of Blanes also appears, and there is much driving to and from the French town of Urdos over the border from Girona province.

== Critical reception ==
The Monthly Film Bulletin wrote: "Lethargically-paced smuggling melodrama, which takes in a good deal of territory without employing its various locations to any particular advantage. The characters – robust American hero, forlorn nightclub singer and hearty, public school customs investigator – are familiar types, and the direction is too slack for the adventures and intrigues in which they are involved to work."

In The Radio Times Guide to Films David Parkinson gave the film 2/5 stars, writing: "Clearly aiming for a Graham Greene sort of entertainment, writer/director Lawrence Huntington is hampered more by the paucity of his imagination than the meagreness of his resources. The acting is disappointing considering the calibre of the cast."

TV Guide wrote, "a lot of action against beautiful continental backgrounds makes up for weaknesses in plot structure"; while Allmovie called it a "fast-paced espionager."

In British Sound Films: The Studio Years 1928–1959 David Quinlan rated the film as "mediocre", writing: "Draggy melodrama."
