= The Glass Mountain (1949 film) =

1949 film by Edoardo Anton, Henry Cass

- Original British quad poster
- Directed by: Henry Cass
- Written by: Emery Bonnet; Henry Cass; John Cousins; John Hunter; Joseph Janni
- Produced by: Joseph Janni; Frederick Zelnic
- Starring: Michael Denison; Dulcie Gray
- Cinematography: William McLeod
- Edited by: Lister Laurance
- Music by: Nino Rota; Louis Levy (director)
- Distributed by: Renown Pictures Corporation (UK) Eagle-Lion Films (US)
- Release date: 9 March 1949 (UK)
- Running time: 98 minutes
- Country: United Kingdom
- Language: English

The Glass Mountain is a 1949 black and white British romantic film drama directed by Henry Cass. It starred Michael Denison, Dulcie Gray and Valentina Cortese. The film was a popular success of its day, and was re-released in the UK in 1950 and 1953. It features acclaimed classical vocalists Elena Rizzieri as herself and Tito Gobbi as himself, with the orchestra and chorus of the Venice Opera House. The theme music by Nino Rota is memorable, and was also a contemporary hit. It was mainly filmed on location in the Dolomites and at Venice's La Fenice Opera House. Co-producer Joseph Janni also co-produced another film shot in Italy, the comedy Honeymoon Deferred, in 1951.

The Guardian wrote, "most reference books now deride the film, but at a time when Britain was emerging from the war into a period of grey austerity, The Glass Mountain and movies like it were a popular tonic. Set in the beautiful Dolomite mountains, with graceful performers and a nostalgically slow pace, it was one of the most successful British films to that date. The part of the composer was taken by Denison, with whom (Dulcie) Gray starred on stage and screen so many times that the Denisons became one of the "royal families" of the British entertainment scene."

A tale from peasant folklore concerns a mountain made of glass and a man's attempts to climb it, to win the love of a princess. For each step he takes, he slides back two steps; so, cleverly, he turns about and climbs it backwards, gaining double elevation with each downward step.

== Plot ==
The film begins in a boat on a river, where a couple find an idyllic riverside cottage to let, but know they cannot afford it. They marry and years pass. The war begins.

Struggling composer Richard Wilder (Michael Denison) becomes an RAF Observer in the Second World War. His aeroplane is shot down over the Italian Dolomite mountains, and he is found unconscious face down in the snow by Alida (Valentina Cortese), who consequently saves his life. She nurses him back to health. She tells him a local legend about two lovers - one a ghost who leads her faithless partner to his doom over a precipice on the Glass Mountain. The legend also says if you shout the name of the person you truly love, an echo will return.

When the war ends, Richard returns to England and his loving wife Anne (Dulcie Gray). He begins composing an opera based on the legend of Dolomite, the Glass Mountain, which has begun to haunt him.

On his wife's birthday, he sees a photograph of Alida on the cover of a magazine. Inside, a caption states that Alida Morisini has come to London to receive an honour. He tries to get in touch with her, but she has already left the country. From then on, he becomes more and more miserable. Anne eventually guesses he is in love with someone else; he confesses he loves Alida.

Richard returns to Italy - alone - and to Alida. The Teatro La Fenice is looking for an opera for their festival, and Tito Gobbi has told them about Richard's (unfinished) one. Meanwhile, Gino, a local man in love with Alida, asks Richard to leave. When he refuses, they fight, but nothing is settled. Richard tries to break up with Alida, but she persuades him not to. Richard's opera is chosen for the festival, so he sends for his lyricist, Bruce McLeod. Bruce tries to convince Alida it is best if she and Richard part.

Anne persuades her friend Charles to fly her to the premiere of Richard's opera La Montagna di Cristallo (The Glass Mountain) in Venice. When they pass near the real Glass Mountain, she asks Charles to show it to her. He obliges, but they crash on the mountain.

The opera tells the tragic tale of Antonio and Maria. Antonio promises his beloved Maria that someday they will climb the Glass Mountain together. However, he goes away to the plain and does not return. Finally, Maria climbs the mountain alone and is never seen again. At Antonio's wedding to another woman, he hears Maria's voice and goes to the mountain to be reunited with her. He climbs and then falls to his death.

Richard conducts his own work and receives a standing ovation at its conclusion. Afterwards, Richard is told of Anne's accident by Alida. He must then choose between his muse and his wife, as the mythical and modern levels of the legend coincide. Alida sees that he has chosen Anne and bids him goodbye. Richard races to the mountain and insists on going out to meet the rescue party. Gino guides him. The doctor tells him that Anne is badly injured, but should recover. He decides life is meaningless without her.

== Chocolate candy used as symbol of bond ==
In the film the Italian chocolate candies (produced by Zàini of Milan) are used as symbol for representing the deep love between Richard and his wife Anne. At the beginning of the movie Richard, still an unknown penniless musician in London, acquires a box of Zàini chocolate candies for his wife Anne. At the end of the film Richard, in the deep of his marriage crisis, sees a box of the same candies in a patisserie in Venice and he remains deeply shaken: he is deeply linked to his Anne.

== Music ==
The score, including the fictional opera at the core of the plot, was composed by Nino Rota, with opera singers Tito Gobbi and Elena Rizzieri playing themselves. Rota recycled some of the material from an earlier Italian film of similar theme (La donna della montagna, 1943), and from a concert work, the orchestral Sinfonia sopra una canzoni d'amore (1947).

Following the release of the film, extracts of music from various parts of the opera were promoted in their own right, gaining considerable popularity in various forms: as the ballad Take the Sun recorded by Tito Gobbi and others; and in various choral, piano solo, light orchestral and military band versions. As The Legend of the Glass Mountain (arranged by Arthur Wilkinson) and Song of the Mountains (arranged by Henry Geehl), the music was widely recorded by the popular light orchestras of the time, including versions by Mantovani, George Melachrino and Sidney Torch. Michael Denison later described it as "The Warsaw Concerto of the moment".

== Cast ==
- Michael Denison as Richard [Wilder]
- Dulcie Gray as Anne [Wilder]
- Valentina Cortese as Alida [Morisini]
- Sebastian Shaw as Bruce [McLeod]
- Tito Gobbi as Himself (Antonio in the opera)
- Elena Rizzieri as Herself (Maria in the opera)
- Antonio Centa as Gino
- F. Terschack as Doctor
- Arnold Marlé as Fenice Administrator
- Sidney King as Charles

== Critical reception ==
TV Guide wrote, "Cortese's performance is outstanding; Denison and Gray, husband and wife in reality, handle their familiar relationship well, but the real stars of the picture are the music, with operatic baritone Gobbi, and the beautiful mountain scenery."

Bosley Crowther, The New York Times critic, was unimpressed, writing, "It is pedestrian stuff saved from being banal by a few performances, the authentic backgrounds and some lilting arias."

Time Out called it "solidly directed, lavishly mounted romantic tosh."

Leonard Maltin's Movie and Video Guide described it as a "beautifully made film of a British composer who writes an opera, inspired by majestic Italian Alps. A treat for music lovers, with many singers from La Scala appearing in opera sequence."

== Musical numbers ==
- "Wayfarer" (Vivian Lambelet and Elizabeth Anthony) first sung by Michael Denison
- "La Montanara" (Ortelli and Pigarelli) sung by Tito Gobbi
- "The Glass Mountain" (Nino Rota) sung by Tito Gobbi and Elena Rizzieri
- Opera sequences sung by Elena Rizzieri and Tito Gobbi of the Scala Opera House, Milan
