= Rain On The Just =

- Written by: Peter Watling
- Original language: English
- Genre: Drama

Premiere
- Date premiered: 1948, Theatre Royal, Newcastle upon Tyne

Rain On The Just is a play by Peter Watling which premiered in 1948 at the Theatre Royal, Newcastle upon Tyne. The cast included Marie Ney, Eileen Peel, Michael Denison, Geoffrey Keen, Dulcie Gray and Edgar Norfolk. Later that year the show moved to the Bristol Old Vic with much of the same cast. Actress Rachel Gurney replaced Gray in the role of the fiancé. The play had its London premiere in August 1948 at the Aldwych Theatre with Dulcie Gray returning to the cast. The play was also broadcast on radio on the BBC's Sunday Night Theatre and in Australia on Radio National in 1951.

== Synopsis ==
Rain On The Just follows an old family that must give up their ancestral home and the issues and strife that come across as a result.

== Reception ==
Reception for the play was mostly positive, with the New English Review reporting that the play was of "first-rate eminence and priority". In his book Post-War Theatre, Albert Edward Wilson commented that Rain On The Just was "Tchehov in English dress" and that the play's theme was "vague". Singer Tony Burrows has stated that the play "made a huge impression on [him]".
