= There Was a Young Lady =

1953 British film by Lawrence Huntington

- Trade show ad from Kine Weekly
- Directed by: Lawrence Huntington
- Written by: Vernon Harris; Lawrence Huntington; John Jowett
- Produced by: A. R. Rawlinson; Ernest G. Roy
- Starring: Michael Denison; Dulcie Gray; Sydney Tafler
- Cinematography: Gerald Gibbs
- Edited by: Joseph Sterling
- Music by: Wilfred Burns
- Production company: Nettlefold Films
- Distributed by: Butcher's Film Service (UK)
- Release date: January 1953 (UK)
- Running time: 84 minutes
- Country: United Kingdom
- Language: English

There Was a Young Lady is a 1953 British second feature ('B') comedy film directed by Lawrence Huntington and starring Michael Denison, Dulcie Gray and Sydney Tafler. It was written by Vernon Harris, Huntington and John Jowett. The film marked the screen debut of Geraldine McEwan.

== Plot ==
Very efficient secretary Elizabeth Foster effectively runs a diamond merchant firm. Her boss David Walsh (who inherited the firm from his uncle, but knows nothing about diamonds) buys a diamond ring from a street vendor, planning to propose to her, but she tells him the diamond is actually paste, and far from worth the £25 he paid. His embarrassment over this causes him to forgo proposing. She tells him of her plan to rescue the firm from its dire financial position, by purchasing the family jewels of a duke David went to school with for £70,000, though they only have to pay £7000 on account; she has a prospective buyer already, who may be willing to pay £90,000. However, David is unwilling to go along with how she intends to raise the sum (which includes mortgaging his willing mother's house), so she quits.

She walks out of her office and straight into the midst of a smash and grab robbery. Accidentally blocking the back door of the gang's getaway car, she is forced to get inside by Joe and driven away. She helps the three crooks evade the pursuing police car after being promised her release, but Johnny, their leader, reneges and she is taken to their hideout in rural Sussex, which is a mansion looked after by the uncle of Basher, another of the thieves. There she meets Arthur, the fourth member of the gang. She tips the farm worker who gives them a ride on his hay wagon to the mansion, but the message she wrote on the pound note is only noticed when he tries to spend it in the pub.

Elizabeth, a prisoner until the gang pull off another planned robbery in a few days, sets to improve their living conditions and also proves to know far more about their jewel haul than they do themselves. All her predictions as to how their future smash-and-grab plan will fail prove to be correct.

The gang, with the exception of Johnny, begin to look up to Elizabeth and treat her very well. She persuades the gang to follow a plan devised by Arthur. To her horror, they rob her former employer, and steal the jewellery David succeeded in buying from the duke. Worse still, displaying his usual ineptitude, Walsh neglected to have it insured. Nevertheless, after getting Elizabeth's message, he rescues her and the jewellery.

Several years later, they are happily married and prosperous, having purchased the mansion in which she was imprisoned, with the gang now employed as their servants.

== Cast ==
- Michael Denison as David Walsh
- Dulcie Gray as Elizabeth Foster
- Sydney Tafler as Johnny
- Charles Farrell as Arthur
- Geraldine McEwan as Irene
- Marcel Poncin as 1st jeweller
- Robert Adair as Basher
- Tommy Duggan as A.R. Weatherspoon, the pools man
- Bill Shine as Charlie, Duke of Chiddingford
- Bill Owen as Joe
- Kenneth Connor as Tom Bass, the cart man
- Basil Dignam as 2nd Jeweller
- Ben Williams as man delivering safe
- Janet Butler as barmaid
- Gerald Rex
- The Tailormaids

== Production ==
It was made at Walton Studios and on location in London. The film's sets were designed by the art director Frederick Pusey. Huntington had been a prominent director in the 1940s but after this film he dropped into making second features.

== Critical reception ==
The Monthly Film Bulletin wrote: "This is a story in which a bright, efficient and very feminine leading character has all the rest of the players in the hollow of her hand. The crooks are never to be taken seriously and the film has a lighthearted gaiety throughout. The resourceful handling of a series of misunderstandings over the delivery of an office safe and a football pool dividend and the general slick standard of construction save a film which would have fallen by its acting standards alone. It moves swiftly and purposefully towards its obvious ending, with Dulcie Gray as the dominant factor throughout."

Kine Weekly wrote: "Bright topical and refreshingly ingenious crime comedy drama. ... The cast, headed by Dulcie Gray, who manages to make the most preposterous situations plausible, is eager, and the dialogue crisp, and the one and the other enable the artless nonsense to raise quite a few laughs."

Radio Times wrote: "Chuckles abound."

In British Sound Films: The Studio Years 1928–1959 David Quinlan rated the film as "average", writing: "Brightish comedy with Miss Gray at her most piquant."

TV Guide noted "Decent comedy is slightly better than average, with Gray at her brightest."
