= Robert Tanitch =

British playwright, author, biographer, lecturer, theatre and film critic

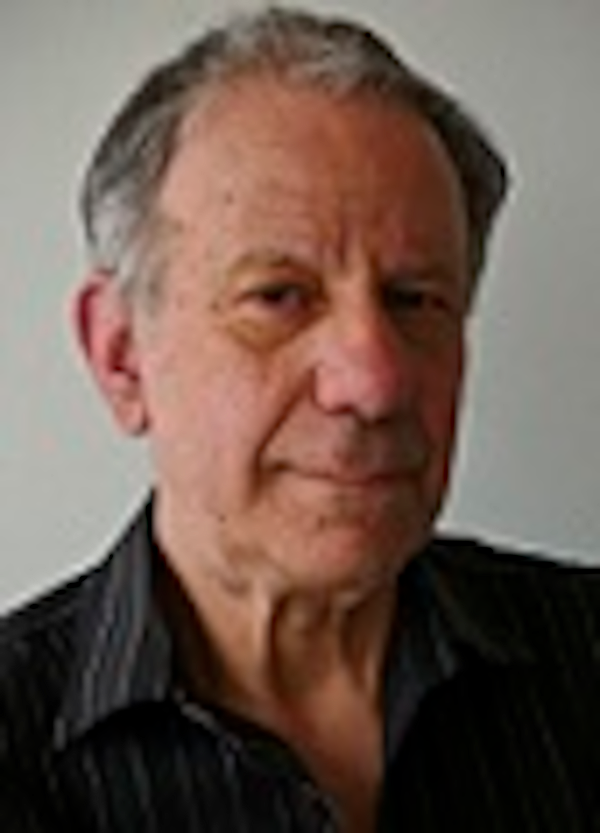

Robert Tanitch is a British playwright, author, biographer, lecturer, theatre and film critic.

The first professional production of one of his plays was while he was still at Oxford University.

== Career ==
His comedies include Call It Love?, with musical numbers by Sandy Wilson, which was staged at Wyndham's Theatre, London and in Vienna in 1960; Came the Knight, directed by Trevor Nunn at the Belgrade Theatre, Coventry, circa 1963; and Highly Confidential, which starred Hermione Gingold at the Cambridge Theatre, London, in 1969. He has also written material for two West End revues.

He has been The Old Vic Theatre's education projects director and has lectured on Shakespeare and run seminars in England, Australia, Indonesia and Kenya.

Tanitch has written and directed the cassette series, Shakespeare Interviews. He devised a Shakespearean revue, Shakespeare in Love (directed by David Giles) which was performed in London and Dallas in order to raise money to rebuild Shakespeare's Globe in Southwark, London.

He has written and directed several revue sketches for YouTube, some starring Timothy West and Prunella Scales.

== Bibliography ==
- A Pictorial Companion to Shakespeare's Plays, Robert Muller (1982) ISBN 0-09-171030-8
- Ralph Richardson, A Tribute, Evans Brothers (1982) ISBN 0-237-45680-X
- Olivier, Thames & Hudson (1985) ISBN 0-500-01363-2
- Leonard Rossiter, Robert Royce (1985) ISBN 0-947728-19-8
- Ashcroft, Hutchinson (1987) ISBN 0-09-171030-8
- Gielgud, Harrap (1988) ISBN 0-245-54560-3
- Dirk Bogarde: The Complete Career Illustrated, Ebury Press (1988) ISBN 0-85223-694-8
- Guinness, Harrap (1989) ISBN 0-245-54827-0; Applause Theatre Book Publishers (1989)
- John Mills, Collins & Brown Ltd (1993) ISBN 1-85585-142-3
- Brando, Cassell Illustrated (1994) ISBN 0-289-80100-1
- Clint Eastwood, Cassell Illustrated (1995) ISBN 0-289-80132-X
- The Unknown James Dean, Batsford (1997) ISBN 0-7134-8034-3
- Oscar Wilde on Stage and Screen, Methuen (1999) ISBN 0-413-72610-X
- Blockbusters! Batsford (2000) ISBN 0-7134-8691-0
- Brando [updated] Cassell Illustrated (2004) ISBN 1-84403-365-1
- Eastwood [updated] Cassell Illustrated (2005) ISBN 1-84403-424-0
- London Stage in the 20th Century, Haus Publishing (2007) ISBN 978-1-904950-74-5
- London Stage in the Nineteenth Century, Carnegie (2010) ISBN 978-1-85936-208-2
