= Boyd Q.C. =

British TV drama series (1956–1964)

- Genre: Legal drama
- Written by: Jack Roffey
- Starring: Michael Denison; Charles Leno
- Country of origin: United Kingdom
- Original language: English
- No. of episodes: 80 (66 missing, 5 incomplete)

Production
- Executive producer: Caryl Doncaster
- Running time: 60 minutes
- Production company: Associated-Rediffusion

Original release
- Network: ITV
- Release: 24 December 1956 – 23 September 1964

Boyd Q.C. is a British legal television programme transmitted from December 1956 to September 1964 by the ITV franchise holder Associated-Rediffusion. It focused around a barrister in a London courtroom and the cases in which he was involved. It ran for seven series in total.

== Cast ==
- Michael Denison – Richard Boyd Q.C.
- Russell Waters – Albert
- Charles Leno – Narrator

== Reception ==
The show was reportedly so accurate that Denison was invited to speak at Law Society of England and Wales dinners.

== Archival status ==
Most of the series was lost. Of the eighty episodes produced, nine episodes survive as recordings; five others survive incomplete; and four have been rediscovered since 2022.

In March 2022, "Sunday's Child", a missing episode from the fifth series, turned up on an eBay auction and sold for £310. It is unknown who the successful bidder was, or if the episode is being negotiated for return to the archives.

On 16 September 2024, it was announced by the Film is Fabulous initiative that three episodes had been found in a private collection:

"The Balance of Her Mind" (Broadcast: 30 April 1958)

"Findings Keepings" (Broadcast: 6 July 1961)

"Sunday's Child" (Broadcast: 20 July 1961)

It is unknown whether the copy of "Sunday's Child" is the one from the aforementioned eBay listing. A fourth episode "Messing About In Boats" (Broadcast: 29/06/1961) has since been recovered.
