= Venus Observed =

1960 play written by Christopher Fry

Venus Observed is a play in blank verse by the English dramatist and poet Christopher Fry. The play concerns a Duke who decides to remarry for a third time. He gets his son Edgar to pick the bride. The Duke likes Perpetua but Edgar wants her for himself.

== Productions ==
It was first performed on 18 January 1950 at the St James's Theatre, London, and ran for 229 performances with the following cast:

- The Duke of Altair – Laurence Olivier
- Edgar, his son – Denholm Elliott
- Herbert Reedbeck, his agent – George Relph
- Dominic, Reedbeck's son – Robert Beaumont
- Rosabel Fleming – Valerie Taylor
- Jessie Dill – Brenda de Banzie
- Captain Fox Reddleman, the Duke's butler – Fred Johnson
- Bates, the Duke's footman – Thomas Heathcote
- Hilda Taylor-Snell – Rachel Kempson
- Perpetua, Reedbeck's daughter – Heather Stannard
- Director – Laurence Olivier
- Set designer – Roger Furse
- Composer – Herbert Menges
- Costume designer – Margaret Furse

Scenes:

- The Observatory Room at Stellmere Park, the Duke's mansion
- The Temple of the Ancient Virtues, Stellmere Park

Olivier's production opened on 13 February 1952 at the New Century Theatre on Broadway, where it ran for 86 performances. A new cast was headed by Rex Harrison as the Duke and his then wife Lilli Palmer as Perpetua.

== Adaptations ==
=== 1957 British TV adaptation ===
The play was broadcast on British TV as an ITV Play of the Week in 1957, with John Robinson as the Duke and Frances Rowe as Rosabel.

=== 1960 Australian TV adaptation ===
Venus Observed
- Directed by: Alan Burke
- Country of origin: Australia
- Original language: English

Production
- Running time: 75 minutes
- Production company: ABC

Original release
- Network: ABC
- Release: 2 November 1960 (Sydney)
- Release: 30 November 1960 (Melbourne)
- Release: 19 June 1961 (Brisbane)

The play was adapted for Australian TV in 1960. It was directed by Alan Burke who had directed a stage production at the Arrow Theatre in Melbourne in 1952.

The cast included Walter Sullivan as Duke of Altair, Rachel Lloyd as Perpetua, David Bluford as Edgar, Jacqueline Kott as Rosabel, Gwen Plumb as Jessie, Ria Sohier as Hilda, Hugh Stewart, John Dennis, John Gray and James Elliott. It was the Australian television debut of English actor Rachel Lloyd, although she had been in two episodes of Whiplash. The sets were by Geoffrey Wedlock.

The critic for The Sydney Morning Herald called Venus Observed a "a pleasantly competent piece of work... a production rich in setting, with exactly the right kind of faded spaciousness you would expect in such a household.... It will be good to see more productions of this calibre.
