= The Young Idea =

1923 play by Noël Coward

Kate Cutler, Herbert Marshall, Noël Coward and Ann Trevor in Act III, 1923

The Young Idea, subtitled "A comedy of youth in three acts", is an early play by Noël Coward, written in 1921 and first produced the following year. After a pre-London provincial tour it ran at the Savoy Theatre for 60 performances from 1 February 1923.

The play portrays the successful manoeuvring by two young adults to prise their father away from his unsympathetic second wife and reunite him with his first wife, their mother.

== Background ==
Coward had one play produced before The Young Idea. I'll Leave It to You, a light comedy, was given in Manchester and then London in 1920, achieving a total of 61 performances. In 1921, Coward was appearing at the St James's Theatre, London, in Polly With a Past, a comedy by George Middleton and Guy Bolton. It ran for several months, and Coward, who always found long runs boring, diverted himself by writing a new play. On his admission, it drew heavily on Bernard Shaw's You Never Can Tell. Concerned that the characters Gerda and Sholto were too similar to the twins Dolly and Philip in Shaw's comedy, Coward arranged for Shaw to be sent a copy of his new play. Shaw made numerous helpful suggestions but advised Coward "never to see or read my plays. Unless you can get clean away from me you will begin as a back number, and be hopelessly out of it when you are forty." In June 1922, producer Robert Courtneidge took up an option on Coward's play and mounted a tour of it, beginning in Bristol, directing it himself. He then presented it at the Savoy Theatre, London, for a run of 60 performances, from 1 February 1923.

== Roles and original cast ==
- George Brent – Herbert Marshall
- Gerda (his daughter) – Ann Trevor
- Sholto (his son) – Noël Coward
- Jennifer (his first wife, divorced) – Kate Cutler
- Cicely (his second wife) – Muriel Pope
- Rodney Masters – Martin Lewis (tour); Leslie Banks (Savoy)
- Priscilla Hartleberry – Phyllis Black
- Claud Eccles – Ronald Ward
- Julia Cragworthy – Naomi Jacob
- Eustace Dabbit – Clive Currie
- Sybil Blaith – Mollie Maitland
- Hiram J Walkin – Ambrose Manning
- Huddle (the butler) – Walter Thompson
- Maria (Italian servant at villa) – Irene Rathbone

== Plot ==
=== Act I ===
The hall of George Brent's country house.

Roddy Masters, a neighbour, is in love with George Brent's wife, Cicely. George walks in on the two, to find them in passionate embrace. He pretends not to have noticed, but after Roddy leaves, he takes Cicely to task, telling her that although he no longer loves her, he is unprepared to have a scandal. The exchange does nothing to alleviate relations between the couple, which are already strained because George has invited Sholto and Gerda – his children from his first marriage – to stay with them.

The young people, brought up on the Continent by George's ex-wife, Jennifer, arrive full of high spirits. They bring out two large photographs of their mother in her garden at Alassio, and, unnoticed by his father, Sholto puts them on the mantelpiece.

A group of house-party guests of the Brents enter. The photographs of Jennifer prompt a discussion of George and Cicely's private lives. Cicely appears and is annoyed to see the photographs. George, much amused, makes Gerda and Sholto take them down. Roddy returns, with the news that his only brother has died in Jamaica, and he himself will be going there to take over his plantation. Gerda and Sholto see Cicely's agitation at this, and as she has been unwelcoming and unfriendly towards them, they determine that they are going to have some fun during their visit.

=== Act II ===
The same

==== Scene 1 ====
The guests are gathered in the hall after dinner, dressed for a hunt ball. The others leave and Sholto and Gerda try to clear things up with Cicely, asking her why she dislikes them so much. She makes a hostile reply and leaves them; they decide to act on their suspicions that she is having an affair with Roddy. Their first move is to enlist the sympathies of once of the guests, Priscilla Hartleberry, by representing themselves as objects of compassion: they spin Priscilla a yarn about their mother, saying that she eloped with an Italian Count and now drinks heavily, a mistake they say they want to stop Cicely from making. The innocent Priscilla is on the verge of telling them what she knows about Cicely and Roddy when they are interrupted.

Getting their father alone, the young people try to rekindle his affection for his ex-wife. They tell him that every year she revisits the scenes of their honeymoon. He tells them emphatically that he is no longer in love with Jennifer and is perfectly content with his life as an English country gentleman. They try to persuade him of the delights of a journey to Italy, but he is adamant that he will stick with Cicely as long as she sticks with him. Gerda replies that case she and Sholto will take matters into their own hands. The arrival of their stepmother drives them from the room.

Cicely complains to George about the children's rudeness towards her; he stands up for them and there is a fierce quarrel. When he leaves she is in such a rage that, when Roddy asks her to go away with him, she is completely willing. They agree to drive to London overnight, and sail from Liverpool the next day. The curtain falls as they embrace.

==== Scene 2 ====
At half-past two in the morning, Sholto and Gerda have returned from the ball ahead of the other guests. They hear a car and see Cicely and Roddy get out. Hiding behind the curtains, they hear Cicely say that she has left a note for George and is going to fetch her luggage.

The young people are delighted, but another car brings their father with Priscilla, who has warned him of the elopement. Still hiding, the young people watch the scene that develops as George confronts the eloping couple. He calmly points out to his wife that life in British colonial society for a woman living with a man to whom she is not married will be highly unpleasant. He adds that she does not really love Roddy, but is merely bored and resentful, which is a very bad reason for eloping.

Cicely is wavering when Sholto and Gerda rush in and contrive to tip the balance by imploring her not to go, because "we're going to stay here always". She repulses them furiously and goes out with Roddy. They forget their luggage, and so Sholto and Gerda rush out after them carrying a suitcase each.

=== Act III ===
Jennifer Brent's villa at Alassio, Italy.

Jennifer Brent is wakened from her siesta by her maid, Maria, announcing a visitor, Jennifer's American admirer Hiram J. Walkin. He has come with a large bunch of flowers to propose to her. He has done so before, without success, but this time she accepts him. She admits that she does not love him, but she thinks her children need a man's influence.

Maria excitedly announces that the carriage bringing the children home is approaching, and Jennifer asks her suitor to wait in another room until she has broken the news to them. After a joyous reunion, the young people say they have a surprise for her; she replies that she has one for them and tells them about her suitor. They conceal their dismay and, while she is fetching him, they quickly decide a plan of action.

Mr Walkin is startled to find that the "children", whom he had imagined to be about twelve, are more or less grown-up. They tell him that their father is not divorced at all, but is a lunatic, and that their mother's sanity is doubtful. At the end of this tale George himself enters, and is introduced by Sholto as "Mr Peasemarsh". Gerda then launches into another preposterous story, but Mr Walkin cuts it short, remarking that he is not half-witted and can see what they are trying to do: "If you didn't want me to marry your mother, why the hell couldn't you say so?" He leaves, offended.

Jennifer, upset by events, starts to have a row with George, while the young people slip away. The realisation dawns, first on George and then on Jennifer, that they still love each other. He exclaims, "Come and kiss me!", and going to him she replies, "George! You haven't altered a bit!".

== Revivals and adaptations ==
The play was revived at the Embassy Theatre, Swiss Cottage, in North London in July 1931 and transferred to the St Martin's Theatre in the West End the following month, running for a total of 81 performances. Cecil Parker played George Brent, Ann Trevor was again Gerda and Arthur Macrae played Sholto.

== Critical reception ==
James Agate wrote of the first production, "One remembers Mr Noel Coward's first play as a very light and entirely admirable comedy. His second, The Young Idea, at the Savoy Theatre, if you examine it closely, reaches after more than it can grasp—a good fault in a young writer … exhilarating and great fun", although he thought Coward had yet to balance plausible realism and theatrical effect.

In 2006 the actor and writer Simon Callow called The Young Idea "a remarkable play, alternately vivacious and painful, expressing all the young Coward's restless, almost violent, impulsiveness".

== References and sources ==
=== Sources ===
- Coward, Noël (1929). "The Young Idea". In J. W. Marriott (ed.). Great Modern British Plays. London: Harrap. OCLC 849931494.
- Holroyd, Michael (1998). Bernard Shaw. London: Vintage. ISBN 978-0-09-974901-1.
- Mander, Raymond; Joe Mitchenson (1957). Theatrical Companion to Coward. London: Rockliff. OCLC 470106222.
