= Jack Whiting (actor) =

American actor, singer and dancer (1901–1961)

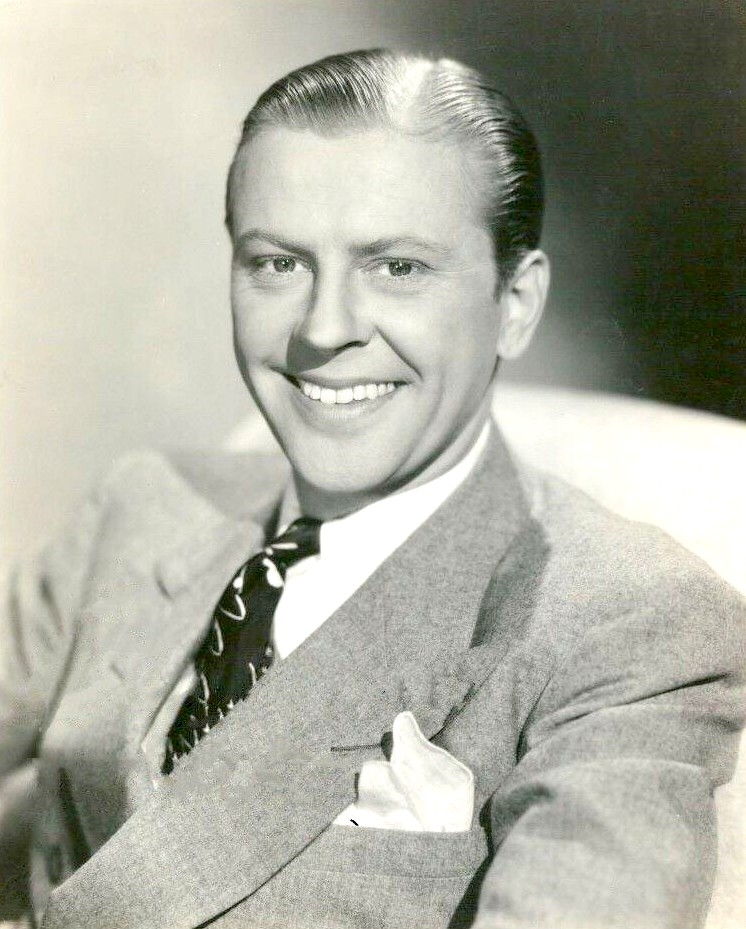
- Whiting in c. 1940
- Born: Albert Draper Whiting, Jr. June 22, 1901; Philadelphia, Pennsylvania, U.S.
- Died: February 15, 1961 (aged 59); New York City, U.S.
- Occupations: Stage performer; actor; singer; dancer; film actor
- Years active: early 1920s–1958
- Style: Musical theatre; musical film; drawing room play; comedy; comedy film
- Spouse: Anna Beth Fairbanks (née Sully) (m. 1929)
- Relatives: Douglas Fairbanks, Jr. (stepson)
- Awards: 1953 Donaldson Award for Best Musical Supporting Performance

Jack Whiting (born Albert Draper Whiting, Jr.; June 22, 1901 – February 15, 1961) was an American actor, singer and dancer whose career ran from the early 1920s through the late 1950s, playing leading men or major supporting figures.

He performed in 30+ musicals on Broadway, including Stepping Stones (1923–1924), Hold Everything! (1928–1929), Take A Chance (1932–1933), Hooray for What! (1937–1938), Hold On to Your Hats (1940–1941), Hazel Flagg (1953) and The Golden Apple (1954). As a dancer, his talent was likened to Fred Astaire's and Gene Kelly's. He starred in London's West End premieres of Anything Goes (1935–1936) and On Your Toes (1937), and recorded medleys from these shows while in England. As a singer, he enjoyed great success with a few hit songs, such as "You're the Cream in My Coffee" (1928), "I've Got Five Dollars" (1931), and "Every Street's A Boulevard In Old New York" (1953).

Whiting acted in theatre plays like Aren't We All? (1923), Design for Living (1943), The Overtons (1945), and A Girl Can Tell (1953), and toured nationally with Arsenic and Old Lace (1941–1942 with Erich von Stroheim, 1943 with Boris Karloff, and 1944 with Bela Lugosi), and with the musicals The Red Mill (1947), High Button Shoes (1948–1949, 1950), and Gay Divorce (1950).

Whiting also starred in a handful of films during the 1930s, including the British musical Sailing Along (1938) with Jessie Matthews, and the American comedy Give Me a Sailor (1938) with Martha Raye, Bob Hope and Betty Grable. He featured in a dozen popular television shows in the 1950s, as his career drew to a close. In 1953, he won the 10th Annual Donaldson Award for Best Musical Supporting Performance in Hazell Flagg, and came second in 1954, for his role in The Golden Apple.

== Early life ==
Whiting was born on June 22, 1901, in Philadelphia, where he worked as a stenographer before going on the vaudeville stage as a young amateur actor with the Mask and Wig Club at the University of Pennsylvania, and developing a career as a singer and dancer, often portraying a smiling, blond leading man or a major supporting character.

== Career ==
=== 1922–1930: Early Broadway musicals, "You're the Cream in My Coffee" ===
Whiting's debut on Broadway was in the 1922 edition of Ziegfeld Follies, in which he sang "Flappers" with the Connor Twins (sisters Thelma and Velma) during a dance by Jimmy Nervo. His career took off and he featured in many musicals where, as stated by Broadway chronicler Thomas Hischak: "he played the all-American boy who gets the all-American girl". In September 1922, he joined the cast of Orange Blossoms, to play one of the eight "Gentlemen in the case" with whom he sang three songs: "On the Riviera", "Orange Blossoms" and "Let's Not Get Married" (all by Victor Herbert and Buddy DeSylva). The following April, he appeared as Bruce in Cinders, again in a group of nine gentlemen singing "I'm Simply Mad about the Boys", "You and I", "The Argentine Arago", and "Cinders" (all by Rudolf Friml and Edward Clark).

In May 1923, Whiting appeared as Martin Steele with Leslie Howard in the Broadway staging of the drawing room comedy Aren't We All?, which ran for 32 performances. In November, he played the role of Captain Paul in the musical comedy Stepping Stones (1923–1924), and sang "In Love With Love" alongside the other principal characters, plus two more songs with the rest of the Company: "Babbling Babette" and "Rose Potpourri Finale". Stepping Stones ran for 11 months and 281 performances, ending on October 4, 1924. Exactly one month later, he was playing Alfred Weatherby in Annie Dear (1924–1925), in which he joined other cast members to sing "The Only Girl" (by Clifford Grey and Sigmund Romberg) and "Help, Help, Help" (by Clare Kummer), and to dance in "A Comic Fantasy" (also by Kummer). In October and November 1925, he played Larry Patton in When You Smile and sang "One Little Girl" with the Girls in the cast, as well as "Gee, We Get Along" and "Oh, What a Girl", both with Wynne Gibson (all songs by Phil Cook and Tom Johnstone). During the latter song, Whiting and Gibson also performed a dumbshow duet to the orchestra's mock sounds of flute, horn and saxophone in musical conversation.

From March to May 1926, he played Tommy Lansing in Rainbow Rose and sang "Jealous" with Billy Tichenor and Dancers, "If You Were Someone Else and Someone Else Were Only Here" with Shirley Sherman and Ensemble, and "Let's Get Married" with Billy Tichenor (all songs by Owen Murphy and Harold Levey). In September, he played Billy Shannon in The Ramblers, in which he sang "All Alone Monday" and "You Smiled at Me", both with Marie Saxon and Chorus, and reprised "All Alone Monday" with Saxon, Eleanor Dawn, Blaine Cordner and Chorus (all songs by Bert Kalmar and Harry Ruby). This show ran for 289 performances, closing on May 28, 1927. He played Robert Bennett in Yes, Yes, Yvette which opened on October 3, 1927, and closed on November 5, after only 40 performances. He sang "My Lady" (by Ben Jerome and Frank Crumit) and "How'd You Like To?" (by Irving Caesar, and music by Stephen Jones), both with Jeanette MacDonald. Despite the show's short-lived run, Charles Brackett nonetheless wrote in The New Yorker that Whiting was "certainly the most promising jeune premier in his department."

In January 1928, he was Bob Martin in She’s My Baby, in which he sang "You're All I Need" with Irene Dunne, "Camera Shoot" with Beatrice Lillie and Clifton Webb, "Trio" with Webb and Nick Long Jr., and "Wasn't It Great?" with Long Jr., William McCarthy, Joan Clement, Pearl Eaton, Phyllis Rae and Ensemble (all songs by Lorenz Hart and Richard Rodgers). This show closed on March 3, after 71 performances. He played "Sonny Jim" Brooks in the highly successful Hold Everything!, which opened on October 10, 1928, and closed nearly a year later, after 409 performances. Whiting sang "Footwork", the highly popular "You're the Cream in My Coffee" with Ona Munson, "Too Good To Be True", and "To Know You Is to Love You" with Munson (all songs by Ray Henderson, Lew Brown and Buddy DeSylva). Whiting then immediately joined the cast of Heads Up!, which opened on November 11, 1929, and ran for 144 performances until March 15, 1930. He played the role of Lieutenant Jack Mason, and sang "Why Do You Suppose?" and "It Must be Heaven", both with Barbara Newberry, and "A Ship Without a Sail" (all songs by Hart and Rodgers).

=== 1930–1935: Early films, more Broadway musicals, "I've Got Five Dollars" ===
In 1930, Whiting turned to acting in three musical comedy films in succession. In June of that year, he joined the cast of College Lovers, in which he starred in the role of Frank Taylor alongside Marian Nixon. He was Jerry Brooks in Top Speed with Joe E. Brown and Bernice Claire, and A. J. Smith in The Life of the Party with Winnie Lightner and Irene Delroy. The following year, he starred opposite Irene Delroy again, this time in the role of Jack Ames in Men of the Sky, a spy drama film with songs.

On February 10, 1931, Whiting opened Rodgers and Hart's America's Sweetheart in the role of Michael Perry, singing three songs with Ann Sothern (née Harriette Lake): "I've Got Five Dollars", "We'll Be the Same", and "Hello Folks! Goodbye Folks!", as well as "How About It?" with Inez Courtney. On February 13, Whiting also recorded the first two of these songs for Brunswick Records. The New York Times said: "Jack Whiting of the blonde hair and baritone voice and Harriette Lake are a personable pair of musical comedy bandmasters. 'I've Got Five Dollars' is far more romantic than it sounds. It is the pet melody of Jack Whiting and H.L. the inevitable love interest." The show closed on June 6, 1931, after 135 performances.

He played three roles in Take A Chance: Kenneth Raleigh, Ronald in scene "Blackmail", and Daniel Boone in scene "Daniel Boone's Defense". The show opened on November 26, 1932, and closed on July 1, 1933, after 243 performances. He sang "So Do I" and "I Long To Belong To You", both with June Knight, "Tickled Pink" with the Girls, and "Turn Out the Light" with Sid Silvers, Jack Haley, June Knight and the Girls (all by Nacio Herb Brown, Richard A. Whiting and Buddy DeSylva),

On December 13, 1934, he featured as himself in Harry Akst and Lew Brown's Calling All Stars, singing three songs with Mitzi Mayfair: "Thinking Out Loud", "I Don't Want To Be President", and "I'd Like To Dunk You In My Coffee", as well as "If It's Love" with Ella Logan, Martha Raye, Judy Canova, plus Boys and Girls. The show closed on January 12, 1935, after 36 performances.

=== 1935–1937: Musicals in London West End, Sailing Along ===
In early 1935, Whiting and his wife Beth travelled to London to join her son, Douglas Fairbanks Jr., for the celebrations of George V's silver jubilee, which took place on May 6. During their break in England, Whiting was offered the lead role of Billy Crocker in C. B. Cochran's London production of Cole Porter's Anything Goes, which opened on June 14. He sang "I Get a Kick Out of You" and "You're the Top" with Jeanne Aubert, "All Through the Night" with Adele Dixon, and "Anything Goes" with the Entire Company. The show closed on January 18, 1936, after 261 performances.

Some critics claimed he was as good as Fred Astaire. Jack had a fine baritone voice, was an agile and graceful dancer and was good looking. He had almost everything, except that special magic that makes a Great Star.

— Douglas Fairbanks, Jr., The Salad Days (1989).

In May 1936, he starred in the London production of Rise and Shine by Harry Graham & Desmond Carter and Robert Stolz, in which he played Jack Harding, with Binnie Hale as Anne. One of the show's songs was "I'm Building Up to an Awful Letdown", written by Fred Astaire and Johnny Mercer. On May 8, The Times commented that while the piece had every possible element of a spectacular musical, it lacked "the impact of a unifying and selective personality." The show was considered a flop and closed on June 13, 1936, after 44 performances.

Still in London, the premiere of On Your Toes took place on February 5, 1937, and when Whiting joined the others in the company for the traditional first night celebrations at the Savoy Grill, "he was once again cheered to the rafters". In the lead role of Phil Dolan III, "Junior", he sang the title song, and "There's a Small Hotel" with Vera Zorina. The show ran for 123 performances and closed on May 29, 1937. Just over a week earlier, on May 21, Whiting and the cast's other main characters appeared in a viewing of excerpts from the same show, televised by the BBC as part of the British series Theatre Parade. Whiting, backed by the New Mayfair Orchestra, also recorded two medleys from the show: one comprised "There's a Small Hotel", "Glad to Be Unhappy", "Quiet Night", and a reprise of "There's a Small Hotel"; the other "It's Got to Be Love", "On Your Toes", "The Heart Is Quicker Than the Eye", and "Slaughter on Tenth Avenue" from the musical ballet of the same name. All of Whiting's recording from On Your Toes are included in the collection Jack Whiting & Jessie Matthews, along with two songs from the 1935 production of Anything Goes: "All Through the Night" sung by Whiting, and "You're the Top" by Whiting and Jeanne Aubert.

Whiting also starred with Jessie Matthews in the British film Sailing Along, shot at Pinewood Studios from August to December 1937. Playing the part of a Broadway star named Dicky Randall, he sang and danced solo to "Souvenir of Love", and with Matthews to "Your Heart Skips a Beat", two songs written by Arthur Johnston and Maurice Sigler. The contemporary Monthly Film Bulletin stated that "Matthews sings adequately and dances superbly, but Whiting matches her in dancing ability and outshines her in singing and acting". For the final big dance number—"My River", which lasted seven minutes on screen—the camera followed Whiting and Matthews for nearly a mile, and the set was so large that it had to be built across two studios. Including rehearsals, the pair danced an estimated twenty miles to complete that single scene. The film opened at the Gaumont Haymarket on April 17, 1938, and was generally released on August 29, 1938.

=== 1937–1944: Return to Broadway, Give Me a Sailor, national tours ===
Whiting resumed working in the US in late 1937 and joined Yip Harburg and Harold Arlen's Hooray for What!, which ran from December 1, 1937, until May 21, 1938, for a very successful 200 performances. In the role of Breezy Cunningham, he sang five songs with June Clyde: "God's Country" (plus dancers), "I've Got Romantic on You", "Napoleon's a Pastry", "Down With Love" (plus Vivian Vance and Ensemble), and "In the Shade of the New Apple Tree" (plus Ralph Blane, Hugh Martin, and dancers). During the opening night in New York, Whiting became ill with a cold and a temperature of 102 degrees, and was replaced by Roy Roberts. From mid-April until early June 1938, Whiting also joined the cast of Give Me a Sailor, a comedy film directed by Elliott Nugent in which he starred alongside Bob Hope, Martha Raye and Betty Grable. In this film, Grable and Whiting sang and danced to "What Goes on Here in My Heart".

On November 17, 1939, he returned to Broadway to play Johnny Graham in Jerome Kern and Oscar Hammerstein II's Very Warm for May, singing "Heaven In My Arms" with Frances Mercer and Hollace Shaw (also with dancers), "Scottische Scena" with Grace McDonald, and "All In Fun" with Mercer. The show closed on January 6, 1940, after 59 performances. On June 4, 1940, he joined Walk With Music in the role of Wing D'Hautville and sang "Even If I Say It Myself" with Alice Dudley and Kenneth Stock, "Walk with Music" with Kitty Carlisle and Ensemble, "Break It Up, Cinderella" with Mitzi Green and Ensemble, "Smile for the Press" and "Friends of the Family" with Carlisle and Art Jarrett, "Today I Am a Glamour Girl" with Carlisle, Green, Jarrett, Betty Lawford and Marty May (all songs by Johnny Mercer and Hoagy Carmichael). The show closed on July 20, 1940, after 55 performances. On September 11, 1940, Whiting played the role of Pete in Hold On to Your Hats and sang two songs with Eunice Healey and others: "The World Is in My Arms" and "Don't Let It Get You Down" (all songs by E. Y. Harburg and Burton Lane). It ran for 158 performances and closed on February 1, 1941.

Later in 1941, Whiting joined the 1941–1942 national roadshow of the play Arsenic and Old Lace, which travelled to 57 cities in about 18 months. (Note: The sources do not provide precise dates for the 1941–1942 national tour of Arsenic and Old Lace, although surviving playbills and newspaper articles confirm that such a tour occurred, and that Whiting performed with Erich von Stroheim at the following venues, among others: Bushnell Memorial Hall in Hartford, CT, on September 18, 1941 (Arsenic and Old Lace Hartford, CT 1941); Erlanger Theatre in Buffalo, NY, on September 22–24, 1941 (Arsenic and Old Lace Buffalo, NY 1941); Plymouth Theatre in Boston, MA, beginning on September 29, 1941 (Arsenic and Old Lace Boston, MA 1941); Court Square Theatre in Springfield, MA, on November 25–26, 1941 (Arsenic and Old Lace Springfield, MA 1941); Embassy Theatre in Johnstwon, PA, on December 5, 1941, for 1 night (Somerset Daily American; December 1, 1941; p.3, col.1); Parkway Theatre in Madison, WI, on January 19, 1942, for 1 night (Wisconsin State Journal; December 28, 1941; p.21, col.1-2); Iowa Theatre in Cedar Rapids, IA, on February 2, 1942 (Cedar Rapids Gazette; February 3, 1942; p.10, col.4-5); Paramount Theatre in Austin, TX, on February 24, 1942 (Austin Daily Texan; February 22, 1942; p.6, col.5); Texas Theatre in San Antonio, TX, on February 25, 1942 (San Antonio Express; February 15, 1942; p.21, col.1); Hanna Theatre in Cleveland, OH, on April 14, 1942 (Arsenic and Old Lace Cleveland, OH 1942); Walnut Street Theatre in Philadelphia, PA, on April 20, 1942, for 4 weeks (Jewish Exponent; April 17, 1942; p.15, col.3-4); National Theatre, Washington, DC, on May 18–30, 1942 (Arsenic and Old Lace Washington, DC 1942).) He shared the role of Mortimer Brewster with Clinton Sundberg alongside Erich von Stroheim's Jonathan Brewster. On October 14, 1942, he returned to a musical theatre role by playing Damon Dillingham in Beat the Band, which ran for 67 performances and closed on December 12, 1942. In this, he performed two songs with Susan Miller: "Keep It Casual" and "Let's Comb Beaches", as well as "Proud of You", "America Loves a Band", "Steam Is on the Beam", "Every Other Heartbeat", and "The Four Freedoms—Calypso" (all songs by George Marion Jr. and Johnny Green). On July 6, 1943, he joined Kitty Carlisle and Philip Huston for eight performances of Noël Coward's comedy play Design for Living at the Hanna Theatre in Cleveland, Ohio, where "critics and public alike cheered the superb performance of Coward's entertaining work". On September 17–18, 1943, Whiting was again playing his role of Mortimer Brewster—at the Playhouse in Wilmington, DE—as part of another tour of Arsenic and Old Lace, (Note: The sources do not provide precise dates for the 1943 national tour of Arsenic and Old Lace, although surviving playbills confirm that such a tour occurred, and that Whiting performed with Boris Karloff; for example, at the Playhouse in Wilmington, DE (Arsenic and Old Lace Wilmington, DE 1943).) with Boris Karloff as Jonathan Brewster. In January 1944, he joined yet another tour of the same play throughout the Midwest and East Coast, this time with Bela Lugosi as Jonathan Brewster, for a run of 80 performances that lasted until June 1944.

=== 1945–1958: Post-war years on Broadway, national tours, television ===
On February 6, 1945, Whiting played Jack Overton in The Overtons, a non-musical play which ran until July 7, for a total of 175 performances across three New York theatres. The following year, he played Con Kidder in replacement of Michael O'Shea in The Red Mill (1945–1947) at least once on February 18, 1946, for an unknown period. After the Broadway run ended on January 4, 1947, Whiting reprised the role full-time during the play's national tour in 1947. (Note: The sources do not provide precise dates for the 1947 national tour of The Red Mill, although surviving playbills confirm that such a tour occurred; for example, at the Opera House in Chicago, IL (The Red Mill 1947 #Ovrtur), and at the Shubert Theatre in Philadelphia, PA during the week beginning September 8, 1947 (The Red Mill Philadelphia 1947).) In that role, he sang "Whistle It", "(Always) Go While the Goin' Is Good", "Good-a-bye, John", and "The Streets of New York (In Old New York)". He then embarked on another national tour by joining High Button Shoes (1948–1949), which opened in Boston (April 14, 1948), and ran for at least 16 shows throughout the Midwest and Great Plains, including Chicago, Denver, Minneapolis, Los Angeles (August 15, 1949), and closing in Kansas City (December 31, 1949), although the show ran again for two weeks the following year (from June 12 through June 25, 1950) at the State Fair Auditorium in Dallas, TX. Playing the leading role of Henry "Papa" Longstreet, he sang "Get Away for a Day in the Country" with Andy Sanders as Stevie Longstreet, "Papa, Won't You Dance with Me?" and "I Still Get Jealous" with Audrey Meadows as Sara Longstreet, and "He Tried to Make a Dollar" with the entire company.

After the 1950 rerun of High Button Shoes, Whiting joined Herbert Kenwith's fourth summer season, playing the lead role of Guy Holden in Cole Porter and Dwight Taylor's musical play Gay Divorce—advertised under the title of the 1934 film, The Gay Divorcee. The musical ran for four weeks, opening on July 17 in East Hampton, NY, and closing on August 19 in Stockbridge, MA, after 28 performances; other cast members included Carol Stone and Lenore Lonergan. The following year, Whiting played the role of Benjamin Tauber in Springtime Folly, a non-musical comedy play in three acts which ran for less than two weeks at the end of February 1951. He returned to the musical stage in May 1952, playing three roles (The Chief Justice, Guide, and Senator from Massachusetts) in George and Ira Gershwin's Of Thee I Sing, which opened at the Ziegfeld Theatre and ran for 72 performances until July 5. Whiting sang "(Entrance of) The Supreme Court Justices" with Male Ensemble, and "The (Senatorial) Roll Call" with Paul Hartman, Donald Foster, Howard Freeman, Mort Marshall and Male Ensemble. This 1952 revival was recorded by Capitol (LP S-350).

In 1953, Whiting played the Mayor of New York in the very successful Hazel Flagg, which opened on February 11 and ran for 190 performances before closing on September 19. He sang Jule Styne and Bob Hilliard's "Every Street's A Boulevard In Old New York" to great critical acclaim, and Robert Coleman in the Daily Mirror wrote that "Jack Whiting had the audience blistering their palms" for encores of that song. Shortly after the opening, his name was placed above the title. He also sang "Everybody Loves to Take a Bow" with Benay Venuta. On June 20, Whiting won the 10th Annual Donaldson Award for Best Musical Supporting Performance in Hazell Flagg. The cast recording was released by RCA Victor (LP # 1010). On October 29, he was J. G. in A Girl Can Tell, a comedy play in three acts which ran for 60 performances, until December 19.

The following year, he played the role of Hector Charybdis, Mayor of Rhododendron and one of "The Heroes" in The Golden Apple, a light-hearted adaptation of Homer's Iliad and Odyssey transposed to the United States during the first decade of the twentieth-century. It opened on April 20, 1954, and ran until August 7, for a total of 125 performances. Whiting sang "Hector's Song", four songs with The Heroes: "The Heroes Come Home", "It Was a Good Adventure", "Helen Is Always Willing" and "The Church Social"; "The Departure for Rhododendron" with The Company; "The Taking of Rhododendron" with Stephen Douglass (Ulysses) and Jonathan Lucas (Paris); and "Scylla and Charybdis" with Dean Michener (who played both Menelaus and Scylla). Brooks Atkinson in the New York Times quipped that "Jack Whiting was now probably destined to play mayors for the remainder of his career", since he had "stopped the show" as New York's mayor in Hazell Flagg. RCA Victor recorded a single LP of the show's musical highlights, released on LP #1014.

In 1956, he played the role of Jack in the musical Strip For Action, which opened on March 17 at the Shubert Theatre (New Haven, CT) and ran there for an unknown duration before relocating to the Shubert Theatre (Philadelphia, PA) on March 27 until April 7, and then moved on to the Nixon Theatre (Philadelphia, PA) on April 9, where it closed on April 14. He sang "Dame Crazy" with Yvonne Adair, "I Just Want to Be a Song and Dance Man", and "Good Old Days of Burlesque" with Adair, Danny Dayton, Jessica James and Lilly Christine.

Whiting's final New York stage appearance was as agent Charlie Davenport at the New York City Center's 1958 revival of Annie Get Your Gun, in which he opened Act I singing "Colonel Buffalo Bill" with Ensemble, and "There's No Business Like Show Business" with James Rennie, David Atkinson and Betty Jane Watson. The show ran for only 15 performances from February 19 to March 2.

On television, Whiting secured minor roles in drama series such as the Armstrong Circle Theatre (1952 and 1954), Studio One (1955), Star Stage (1955), and The Alcoa Hour (1955), as well as The Joseph Cotten Show: On Trial and The Marge And Gower Champion Show (both 1957). He also performed in Paris in the Springtime (1956), a live telecast produced by Max Liebman and starring Dan Dailey, Gale Sherwood and Helen Gallagher, in which he reprised "Down With Love" from Hooray for What!

== Personal life ==
In early 1929, Anna Beth Fairbanks (née Sully; Douglas Fairbanks's ex-wife; (Note: After divorcing Fairbanks on November 30, 1918 (Hollywood Forever), Beth Sully had married stockbroker James Evans, Jr. and filed for divorce on October 13, 1924 (Time 1924).) born June 20, 1888), attended a performance of Hold Everything!, in which Whiting was the leading man. They met and became inseparable. They were witnesses at the June 3, 1929, wedding of her son Douglas Fairbanks, Jr. and Joan Crawford, then got married themselves a few weeks later, on June 28, and moved into an apartment on East 52nd Street.

In his 1988 autobiography, Fairbanks, Jr. wrote: "Jack was a handsome redhead, about twenty-seven or -eight years old, with a virile baritone that helped make 'You're the Cream in My Coffee' a successful song. (...) Jack was warm and friendly, and we hit it off handsomely. (...) I had a new stepfather – charming, gifted, and only eight or nine years older than I." Despite the difference in age between Whiting and his wife, he was devoted to her and remained so all his life.

Although Whiting was earning a good deal of money at the time ("for the theater, that is ..."), he was assisting his father—Albert Draper Whiting, Sr., a retired doctor—and mother, and Beth was helping her siblings, Gladys and William. For the rest of Whiting's life, he and Beth remained in regular, close contact with her son, who also extended financial support to them when Whiting was out of work, or when his jobs on Broadway were short-lived. When he was in New York, Whiting would frequent The Lambs Club—which he had joined in 1926—where he and John Hundley (and the other Lambs) periodically performed in sketches called "Lambs' Gambols"; as such, he featured among the stars lined up on the occasion of the big World's Fair gambol performed at the Imperial Theatre on April 23, 1939.

He had a talent for dancing that was equal – some say – to Fred Astaire's or Gene Kelly's.

— Douglas Fairbanks, Jr., The Salad Days (1989).

== Death ==
Whiting died of acute coronary thrombosis in his Manhattan apartment on Wednesday, February 15, 1961, while watching television with his wife Beth.

== Work ==
=== Musical theatre ===
In the table below, all theatres are located in New York, NY, except where indicated.

Title	Role	Theatre	Opening date	Closing date	# of perf.	Ref.
Ziegfeld Follies	(Singer)	New Amsterdam Theatre	June 5, 1922	June 23, 1923	424	
Orange Blossoms	(One of the Gentlemen)	Fulton Theatre	September 19, 1922	December 9, 1922	95	
Cinders	Bruce	Dresden Theatre	April 3, 1923	April 28, 1923	31	
Stepping Stones	Captain Paul	Globe Theatre	November 6, 1923	October 4, 1924	281	
Annie Dear	Alfred Weatherby	Times Square Theatre	November 4, 1924	January 31, 1925	103	
When You Smile	Larry Patton	National Theatre	October 5, 1925	October 18, 1925	49	
When You Smile	Larry Patton	Central Theatre	October 19, 1925	November 14, 1925	49	
Rainbow Rose	Tommy Lansing	Forrest Theatre	March 16, 1926	May 1, 1926	55	
The Ramblers	Billy Shannon	Lyric Theatre	September 20, 1926	May 28, 1927	289	
Yes, Yes, Yvette	Robert Bennett	Sam H. Harris Theatre	October 3, 1927	November 5, 1927	40	
She’s My Baby	Bob Martin	Globe Theatre	January 3, 1928	March 3, 1928	71	
Hold Everything!	"Sonny Jim" Brooks	Broadhurst Theatre	October 10, 1928	October 5, 1929	409	
Heads Up!	Jack Mason	Alvin Theatre	November 11, 1929	March 15, 1930	144	
America's Sweetheart	Michael Perry	Broadhurst Theatre	February 10, 1931	June 6, 1931	135	
Take A Chance	Kenneth Raleigh, Ronald, Daniel Boone	Apollo Theatre	November 26, 1932	July 1, 1933	243	
Calling All Stars	(Himself)	Hollywood Theatre	December 13, 1934	January 12, 1935	36	
Anything Goes	Billy Crocker	Palace Theatre, London	June 14, 1935	January 18, 1936	261	
Rise and Shine	Jack Harding	Drury Lane, London	May 7, 1936	June 13, 1936	44	
On Your Toes	Phil Dolan III, "Junior"	Palace Theatre, London	February 5, 1937	May 29, 1937	123	
Hooray for What!	Breezy Cunningham	Winter Garden Theatre	December 1, 1937	May 21, 1938	200	
Very Warm for May	Johnny Graham	Alvin Theatre	November 17, 1939	January 6, 1940	59	
Walk With Music	Wing D'Hautville	Ethel Barrymore Theatre	June 4, 1940	July 20, 1940	55	
Hold On to Your Hats	Pete	Shubert Theatre	September 11, 1940	February 1, 1941	158	
Beat the Band	Damon Dillingham	46th Street Theatre	October 14, 1942	December 12, 1942	67	
The Red Mill	Con Kidder (*)	46th Street Theatre	December 24, 1945	January 4, 1947	531	
The Red Mill	Con Kidder	(1947 National tour)	(Unknown)	(Unknown)	N/A	
High Button Shoes	Henry Longstreet	(1948–1949 National tour)	April 14, 1948?	December 31, 1949?	N/A	
High Button Shoes	Henry Longstreet	State Fair Auditorium, Dallas, TX	June 12, 1950	June 25, 1950	N/A	
Gay Divorce	Guy Holden	Guild Hall, East Hampton, NY	July 17, 1950	July 29, 1950	28	
Gay Divorce	Guy Holden	McCarter Theatre, Princeton, NJ	July 31, 1950	August 5, 1950	28	
Gay Divorce	Guy Holden	Berkshire Playhouse, Stockbridge, MA	August 14, 1950	August 19, 1950	28	
Of Thee I Sing	The Chief Justice, Guide, Senator from Massachusetts	Ziegfeld Theatre	May 5, 1952	July 5, 1952	72	
Hazel Flagg	Mayor of New York	Mark Hellinger Theatre	February 11, 1953	September 19, 1953	190	
The Golden Apple	Hector Charybdis	Alvin Theatre	April 20, 1954	August 7, 1954	125	
Strip For Action	Jack	Shubert Theatre, New Haven, CT	March 17, 1956	March ??, 1956	N/A	
Strip For Action	Jack	Shubert Theatre, Philadelphia, PA	March 27, 1956	April 7, 1956	N/A	
Strip For Action	Jack	Nixon Theatre, Philadelphia, PA	April 9, 1956	April 14, 1956	N/A	
Annie Get Your Gun	Charlie Davenport	New York City Center	February 19, 1958	March 2, 1958	15	

(*) In replacement of Michael O'Shea, at least once on February 18, 1946, for an unknown period.

=== Theatre ===
In the table below, all theatres are located in New York, NY, except where indicated.

Title	Role	Theatre	Opening date	Closing date	# of perf.	Ref.
Aren't We All?	Martin Steele	Gaiety Theatre	May 21, 1923	June 1, 1923	32	
Arsenic and Old Lace	Mortimer Brewster	(1941–1942 National tour)	April 6, 1941	(Unknown)	N/A	
Design for Living	Otto or Leo	Hanna Theatre; Cleveland, OH	July 6, 1943	July 11, 1943	8	
Arsenic and Old Lace	Mortimer Brewster	(1943 National tour)	(Unknown)	(Unknown)	N/A	
Arsenic and Old Lace	Mortimer Brewster	(1944 National tour)	January 29, 1944	June 3, 1944	80	
The Overtons	Jack Overton	Booth Theatre	February 6, 1945	March 10, 1945	175	
The Overtons	Jack Overton	Forrest Theatre	March 12, 1945	June 23, 1945	175	
The Overtons	Jack Overton	National Theatre	June 25, 1945	July 7, 1945	175	
Springtime Folly	Benjamin Tauber	New Gayety; Washington, DC	February 19, 1951	February 24, 1951	≈ 10	
Springtime Folly	Benjamin Tauber	John Golden Theatre	February 26, 1951	February 27, 1951	≈ 10	
A Girl Can Tell	J.G.	Royale Theatre	October 29, 1953	December 19, 1953	60	

=== Films ===
- College Lovers (1930), as Frank Taylor
- Top Speed (1930), as Gerald Brooks
- The Life of the Party (1930), as the real Jerry "A.J." Smith
- Men of the Sky (1931), as Jack Ames
- Sailing Along (1938), as Dicky Randall
- Give Me a Sailor (1938), as Walter Brewster

=== Selected recordings ===
- Anything Goes (Prism 938, 2003) – CD of 1935 original recording by London cast
- On Your Toes Medley (Pearl 114, 2001) – CD of 1937 original recording by London cast
- Very Warm for May (AEI 8, 1995) – CD of 1939 original recording by Broadway cast
- Of Thee I Sing (Angel 65025, 1994) – CD of 1952 original recording by Broadway cast
- Hazel Flagg (Masterworks Broadway RCA Victor 05097, 2009) – CD of 1953 original recording by Broadway cast
- The Golden Apple (RCA 09026-68934-2, 1997) – CD of 1954 original recording by Broadway cast
- Jack Whiting & Jessie Matthews (Monmouth Evergreen MES/7049, 1972) – Vinyl LP

=== Television ===
- Theatre Parade, in a BBC broadcast of excerpts from On Your Toes, such as "Slaughter on Tenth Avenue", the "Princess Zenobia ballet", and others (May 21, 1937) – with Vera Zorina, Olive Blakeney, Marjorie Browne and Eddie Pola
- Armstrong Circle Theatre, in "The Nothing Kid" (December 16, 1952)
- Armstrong Circle Theatre, in "The Pride of Jonathan Craig" (February 2, 1954)
- The Ed Sullivan Show, in a song-and-dance routine with Audrey Meadows (August 8, 1954)
- Studio One, as Tim O'Hara in "A Likely Story" (October 3, 1955)
- Star Stage, in "Trumpet Man" (October 21, 1955)
- The Alcoa Hour, as J.G in "A Girl Can Tell" (November 13, 1955)
- Max Liebman Presents: Paris in the Springtime, as himself, singing "Down With Love" (January 21, 1956)
- Arthur Godfrey and His Friends, as himself (February 27, 1957)
- The Joseph Cotten Show: On Trial, as Hartford in "The Case of Double Trouble" (March 1, 1957)
- The Marge And Gower Champion Show, as Marge's father (March 31, 1957 – June 9, 1957)
- The Vic Damone Show, as himself, singing "You're the Cream in My Coffee" (August 7, 1957)

== Awards ==
- 1953: Won the 10th Annual Donaldson Award (1952–1953) for Best Musical Supporting Performance in Hazell Flagg.
- 1954: Runner-up (to Harry Belafonte's win for John Murray Anderson's Almanac) at the 11th Annual Donaldson Award (1953–1954) for Best Musical Supporting Performance in Golden Apple.
