= Queen High =

1930 film

- Film title card
- Directed by: Fred C. Newmeyer
- Written by: Musical play (Queen High): Buddy G. DeSylva; Lewis E. Gensler; Laurence Schwab
- Produced by: Frank Mandel; Laurence Schwab
- Starring: Charlie Ruggles; Frank Morgan; Ginger Rogers
- Cinematography: William O. Steiner
- Edited by: Barney Rogan
- Music by: Al Goodman; Johnny Green
- Distributed by: Paramount Pictures
- Release date: August 23, 1930
- Running time: 85 minutes
- Country: United States
- Language: English

Queen High is the title of an American pre-Code musical comedy film, produced by Paramount Pictures in 1930. Based upon the 1926 stage musical Queen High that Buddy DeSylva, Lewis Gensler, and Laurence Schwab had adapted from Edward Peple's 1914 farce A Pair of Sixes.

The film stars Charlie Ruggles, Frank Morgan, and Ginger Rogers in one of her earliest film appearances. Making her first film appearance in an uncredited bit part is tap dancer Eleanor Powell, whose career in musicals would not take off for another five years. Powell was appearing on Broadway in a show entitled Follow Thru at the time, and a segment of the show was filmed for the movie. Both Rogers and Powell were still in their teens. Principal photography took place in Astoria Studios in Queens.

== Plot ==
Queen High (1930)

A rivalry between two businessmen results in a game of poker. Whoever loses the game becomes the winner's servant for a year.

== Cast ==
- Charles Ruggles as T. Boggs Johns
- Frank Morgan as Mr. Nettleton
- Ginger Rogers as Polly Rockwell
- Stanley Smith as Dick Johns
- Helen Carrington as Mrs. Nettleton
- Rudolph Cameron as Cyrus Vanderholt
- Betty Garde as Florence Cole
- Teresa Maxwell-Conover as Mrs. Rockwell
- Nina Olivette as Coddles
- Tom Brown as Jimmy
- Eleanor Powell (as uncredited dancer)

== Soundtrack ==
- "Everything Will Happen for the Best"

Written by Buddy G. DeSylva and Lewis E. Gensler

- "Brother, Just Laugh It Off"

Written by Arthur Schwartz and Ralph Rainger

- "I'm Afraid of You"

Written by Arthur Schwartz and Ralph Rainger

- "It Seems to Me"

Written by Howard Dietz (as Dick Howard) and Ralph Rainger

- "I Love the Girls in My Own Peculiar Way"

Written by E.Y. Harburg and Henry Souvaine

== Preservation ==
Though part of the 700 or so films Paramount sold to Universal, the film is preserved in the Library of Congress with a copy.
