= Button Up Your Overcoat =

- Sheet music, 1928

Song
- Released: 1928
- Songwriters: Ray Henderson, Buddy DeSylva, Lew Brown

External audio
- "Button Up Your Overcoat" sung by Helen Kane at the Internet Archive Digitized from a 78 single released in 1929.
- "Button Up Your Overcoat" sung by Zelma O'Neal at the Internet Archive. With Al Goodman and his "Follow Thru" Orchestra. Digitized from a 78 single released in 1929.

"Button Up Your Overcoat" is a popular song. The music was written by Ray Henderson, the lyrics by B.G. DeSylva and Lew Brown. The song was published in 1928 and was first performed later that same year by vocalist Ruth Etting. However, the most famous rendition of this song was recorded early the following year by singer Helen Kane, who was at the peak of her popularity at the time. Kane's childlike voice and Bronx dialect eventually became the inspiration for cartoon character Betty Boop, most famously using Kane's catchphrase "Boop Boop a Doop."

From January 9, 1929, to December 21, 1929, Jack Haley and Zelma O'Neal sang "Button Up Your Overcoat" on Broadway in the musical, Follow Thru. They reprised the song in the film version which opened on September 27, 1930, and was one of the first movies in Technicolor.

== Other recordings ==
- Paul Whiteman (vocal by Vaughn De Leath) (1929)
- Fred Waring's Pennsylvanians (1929)
- Johnny Mercer (1946)
- The Hi-Lo's included the song on their album I Presume (1955).
- Carol Channing on her album Jazz Baby (1994)
- Nancy Sinatra covered the song for the 1966 album Sugar
- Bing Crosby recorded the song in 1956 for use on his radio show and it was subsequently included in the box set The Bing Crosby CBS Radio Recordings (1954-56) issued by Mosaic Records (catalog MD7-245) in 2009.
- John Serry, Sr. with his ensemble for Dot Records (catalog #DLP-3024) for a 33 RPM vinyl recording entitled Squeeze Play in 1956.
- Eydie Gorme – included in her album Eydie Gormé – Vamps The Roaring 20's (1958)
- The Bonzo Dog Doo-Dah Band recorded a version as the B-side of their 1966 single "Alley Oop".
- Connie Francis – for her album Connie & Clyde – Hit Songs of the 30s (1968)

== Film appearances ==
- 1930 Follow Thru – sung by Jack Haley and Zelma O'Neal
- 1946 Margie – sung by Rudy Vallee, Barbara Lawrence
- 1956 Gordon MacRae sang "Button Up Your Overcoat" in the movie The Best Things in Life Are Free.
- 1971 Loving Memory
- 1974 The Front Page – sung by Susan Sarandon
- 1985 The Sure Thing – two characters sing "Button Up Your Overcoat" as part of a medley of show tunes during a road trip. The song also appears on the film's soundtrack.
- 1996 Jack
- 2011 Water for Elephants – performed by Ruth Etting.
- 2012 Parental Guidance
- 2019 Dolemite Is My Name – performed by Ruth Etting

== In popular culture ==
In 1969, the song was parodied in a television commercial for Contac cold capsules. In that commercial, a group of blonde chorus girls known as "The Cold Diggers of 1969" sing and dance to "Button Up Your Overcoat" in a Busby Berkeley- style production number.

Father Mulcahy and Hawkeye sing "Button Up Your Overcoat" in episode 20, season 6 of M*A*S*H, "Mail Call Three".

In 1997, the Kidsongs Kids and the Biggles sang "Button Up Your Overcoat" as part of the Kidsongs: I Can Do It! VHS/DVD.

Helen Kane's 1929 cover of the song appears anachronistically in the 2013 video game BioShock Infinite, set in 1912, and can be heard in the Downtown Emporia level.

The song was added to the 1993 revision of the musical Good News.
