= Frank Mandel =

American playwright and producer (1884–1958)

Frank Mandel (1884 – April 20, 1958) was an American playwright and producer. He co-wrote several productions. Some of his works were adapted by others. Several of his collaborations were adapted into films. UCLA's libraries have a collection of his papers.

He was born Frank Armand Mandel in San Francisco. He attended the University of California where he was interested in the public speaking society, the Student's Congress and debating team, as well as being active in the Glee Club, along with Richard Walton Tully. Mandel graduated in 1904 with a Bachelor of Letters degree and then attended Hastings Law School. After his education he started selling suits with his father, working in real estate, and writing plays. When real estate took a dive after the 1905 earthquake and fire he got together $5,000 and headed East to write plays.

After writing No, No, Nanette, he formed the production team of Schwab and Mandel with Laurence Schwab. They produced works such as Follow Thru, Good News, The Firebrand and America's Sweetheart.

He died on April 20, 1958, in Hollywood.

== Theater ==
- Our Wives (1912), co-wrote with Helen Craft/Kraft from the German 1897 play Jugendfreunde by Ludwig Fulda. Later adapted into the musical comedy The Only Girl by Victor Herbert
- My Lady Friends (1919) co-author with Emil Nyiray
- The Five Million, co-author
- Mary, co-author with Otto Harbach; score by Louis Hirsch
- No, No, Nanette (1925) co-author with Otto Harbach
- The O'Brien Girl (1922)
- The New Moon
- The Desert Song
- Tickle Me (play)
- America's Sweetheart (musical) (1931)
- East Wind (musical)
- Follow Thru (musical) (1929)

== Filmography ==
- The Desert Song (1929 film)
- No, No, Nanette (1930 film)
- New Moon (1930 film)
- Follow Thru (1930)
- Good News (1947 film)
- Tea for Two (film) (1950)
- The Desert Song (1953 film)
