= Good News (1947 film) =

1947 film by Charles Walters

- Poster for the 1947 film
- Directed by: Charles Walters
- Screenplay by: Betty Comden; Adolph Green
- Based on: Good News; 1927 musical by Lew Brown; Laurence Schwab; Frank Mandel; Buddy G. DeSylva; Ray Henderson
- Produced by: Arthur Freed
- Starring: June Allyson; Peter Lawford; Patricia Marshall
- Cinematography: Charles Schoenbaum
- Edited by: Albert Akst
- Music by: Lennie Hayton
- Color process: Technicolor
- Production company: Metro-Goldwyn-Mayer
- Distributed by: Loew's Inc.
- Release dates: December 26, 1947 (New York City); July 27, 1948 (United States)
- Running time: 93 minutes
- Country: United States
- Language: English
- Budget: $1,715,000
- Box office: $2,956,000

Good News is a 1947 American Metro-Goldwyn-Mayer musical film based on the 1927 stage production of the same name. It starred June Allyson, Peter Lawford, Mel Tormé, and Joan McCracken. The screenplay by Betty Comden and Adolph Green was directed by Charles Walters in Technicolor.

Three additional songs were written for the film: "The French Lesson", "Pass That Peace Pipe", and "An Easier Way", the last of which was cut from the released film.

Good News was the second adaptation of the stage musical, after the 1930 film Good News. The 1947 film was a more sanitized version of the musical; the 1930 version included Pre-Code content, such as sexual innuendo and lewd suggestive humor.

== Plot ==
The film is set in 1927 at fictional Tait College, where football is all the rage ("Tait Song"/"Good News").

Tait's football star Tommy Marlowe is a prime catch for the college girls. Tommy tells his friend and non-playing teammate Bobby Turner that the trick to attracting girls is to show no interest ("Be a Ladies' Man"). At a sorority party, the most ridiculously beautiful, glamorous and snobby new student Pat McClellan resists an overly-confident Tommy's advances, cutting him down to size ("Lucky in Love"). Status-seeker Pat has eyes for wealthy Peter Van Dyne III instead of Tommy.

Pat insults Tommy in French, so Tommy enlists part-time school librarian Connie Lane to help him study the language ("The French Lesson"). Tommy gradually falls for Connie, who comes from a poor background, which does not bother her ("The Best Things in Life are Free"). Tommy kisses Connie, but annoys her by still focusing on Pat. Connie grows attracted to Tommy despite herself. Meanwhile, Connie's roommate Babe Doolittle wants to leave a relationship with jealous football player Beef so she can get involved with Bobby Turner. Bobby admits his attraction to Babe, but he is too scared of Beef to make a move.

At the local soda shop, Tommy's newly learned French fails to impress Pat, who is with Peter. Tommy leaves dejectedly. When Babe snarkily suggests Pat has chosen the wrong beau, Pat snaps back at Babe, who advises Pat not to lose her temper ("Pass That Peace Pipe"). Babe, concerned Tommy's frame of mind will cause him to lose the big game, revives Pat's interest by (untruthfully) telling her Tommy comes from a wealthy family. Tommy asks Connie to the big dance and she is thrilled, but Tommy reneges at the last minute when Pat shows interest (due to his "fortune"). Connie is heartbroken ("Just Imagine").

Tommy is failing French and begs for help from a reluctant Connie - he belatedly realizes his true feelings for her, though Pat has pressured him into proposing. Tommy deliberately fails his French exam using answers that make Connie realize he loves her, but Prof. Kennyon privately tells Connie that he will allow Tommy to pass anyway so he can play in the big game. Connie fears Pat will wind up with him, but piques Tommy's jealousy when he sees her with Peter Van Dyne at the after-game dance.

In the end, Tait wins the game, Tommy pairs off with Connie, Beef pairs off with Pat, and Babe pairs off with Bobby Turner. Everyone bursts into song in the final production number ("Varsity Drag").

== Cast ==
- June Allyson as Connie Lane
- Peter Lawford as Tommy Marlowe
- Patricia Marshall as Pat McClellan
- Joan McCracken as Babe Doolittle
- Ray McDonald as Bobby Turner
- Mel Tormé as Danny
- Robert Strickland as Peter Van Dyne III
- Donald MacBride as Coach Johnson
- Tom Dugan as Pooch
- Clinton Sundberg as Professor Burton Kennyon
- Loren Tindall as Beef
- Connie Gilchrist as Cora the cook
- Morris Ankrum as Dean Griswold
- Georgia Lee as Flo
- Jane Green as Mrs. Drexel

== Production ==
The film was originally planned for Mickey Rooney and Judy Garland as a follow-up to their success in 1939's "Babes in Arms".

Good News and Summer Stock were also originally planned to become part of the backyard musical series. Summer Stock was released three years later.

== Soundtrack ==
- "Good News"
  - Music by Ray Henderson
  - Lyrics by Lew Brown and Buddy G. DeSylva
  - Sung by Joan McCracken and chorus
- "Tait Song"
  - Music by Ray Henderson
  - Lyrics by Lew Brown and Buddy G. DeSylva
  - Performed by Joan McCracken and chorus
- "Be a Ladies' Man"
  - Music by Ray Henderson
  - Lyrics by Lew Brown and Buddy G. DeSylva
  - Performed by Peter Lawford, Ray McDonald, Mel Tormé, and Lon Tindal
- "Lucky in Love"
  - Music by Ray Henderson
  - Lyrics by Lew Brown and Buddy G. DeSylva
  - Performed by Patricia Marshall, Joan McCracken, Mel Tormé, June Allyson, and Peter Lawford
- "The French Lesson"
  - Written by Roger Edens, Betty Comden, and Adolph Green
  - Performed by June Allyson and Peter Lawford
- "The Best Things in Life Are Free"
  - Music by Ray Henderson
  - Lyrics by Lew Brown and Buddy G. DeSylva
  - Performed by June Allyson
  - Performed also by Mel Tormé
- "Pass That Peace Pipe"
  - Written by Roger Edens, Hugh Martin, and Ralph Blane
  - Performed by Joan McCracken, Ray McDonald, and chorus
- "Just Imagine"
  - Music by Ray Henderson
  - Lyrics by Lew Brown and Buddy G. DeSylva
  - Sung by June Allyson
- "The Varsity Drag"
  - Music by Ray Henderson
  - Lyrics by Lew Brown and Buddy G. DeSylva
  - Performed by June Allyson, Peter Lawford, and chorus

=== Deleted song ===
"An Easier Way", sung by June Allyson and Patricia Marshall, was filmed but cut from the released version. This musical number survives and is included as an "extra" on the DVD.

== Reception ==
=== Box office ===
The film was a box office disappointment, earning $2,545,000 in the US and Canada and $411,000 elsewhere, recording a loss of $7,000.

=== Awards ===
Edens, Martin and Blane were nominated for the Academy Award for Best Original Song for "Pass That Peace Pipe".

== See also ==
- List of American football films
