= Take a Chance (1933 film) =

1933 film

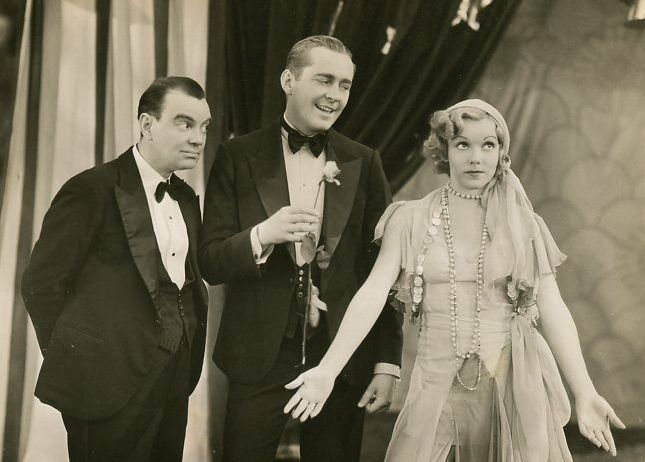
- Cliff Edwards, James Dunn, and June Knight in a publicity photo
- Directed by: Monte Brice; Laurence Schwab
- Screenplay by: Monte Brice; Buddy G. DeSylva; Laurence Schwab; Sid Silvers; Richard A. Whiting
- Produced by: William Rowland
- Starring: James Dunn; June Knight; Lillian Roth; Cliff Edwards; Lilian Bond; Dorothy Lee; Lona Andre
- Cinematography: William O. Steiner
- Music by: Songs: Harold Arlen (music); Roger Edens (music); Jay Gorney (music); Yip Harburg (lyrics); Billy Rose (lyrics); Herman Hupfeld; Vincent Youmans (music); Nacio Herb Brown (music); Richard A. Whiting (music); Buddy DeSylva (lyrics); Louis Alter (music); Arthur Swanstrom (lyrics)
- Production company: Paramount Pictures
- Distributed by: Paramount Pictures
- Release date: October 27, 1933
- Running time: 82 minutes
- Country: United States
- Language: English

Take a Chance is a 1933 American Pre-Code comedy film directed by Monte Brice and Laurence Schwab and written by Monte Brice, Buddy G. DeSylva, Laurence Schwab, Sid Silvers and Richard A. Whiting. It is based on the musical of the same name. The film stars James Dunn, June Knight, Lillian Roth, Cliff Edwards, Lilian Bond, Dorothy Lee and Lona Andre. The film was released on October 27, 1933, by Paramount Pictures.

== Plot ==
"Tired of performing striptease for small-town carnivals, Wanda Hill leaves her pickpocket boyfriend, Duke Stanley, and his partners, Louie Webb and Toni Ray, and heads for Broadway. Wanda advises Toni to drop her crooked partners, but they promise to "go straight," and become card dealers at Mike Caruso's club in Greenwich Village. Toni gets a job singing at Caruso's and all three split their earnings.

Wanda brings her theatrical producer, Kenneth Raleigh, to the club to see Toni perform, and he immediately falls for her. Ken's father Andrew is backing his musical revue, Humpty Dumpty . That night, Caruso orders Duke and Louie to use loaded dice against Ken, and after Toni innocently suggests he play dice, Ken loses $600. Toni is mortified, but returns the money and regains Ken's admiration and a part in the revue. Duke and Louie then audition, but make fools of themselves.

At a charity gala for homeless dogs hosted by Andrew, Ken proposes to Toni. Caruso arrives and scares Duke and Louie into paying off Toni's wardrobe debts and returning Ken's $600. To save Toni's romance, Duke and Louie stage a fixed raffle in which Wanda wins her own diamond brooch. When Wanda exposes the gag to Ken, he agrees to let them keep the money if they promise never to see Toni again. Raleigh then accuses Toni of being "in on the take," and she disappears before the revue's opening night.

Duke and Louie retrieve Toni in time for her big number with Ken, and she and Ken kiss. An accident backstage during intermission wounds three actors, and Duke, Louie and Ken's little sister must stand in for them. Duke and Louie's hilarious performance turns a historical drama on Daniel Boone into slapstick. The press raves about the revue's unknown actors, and Duke and Louie finally win Ken's favor. Ken then builds a beach set for his and Toni's honeymoon. On the "beach," Duke kisses Wanda."

== Cast ==
- James Dunn as Duke Stanley
- June Knight as Toni Ray
- Lillian Roth as Wanda Hill
- Cliff Edwards as Louie Webb
- Lilian Bond as Thelma Green
- Dorothy Lee as Consuelo Raleigh
- Lona Andre as Miss Miami Beach
- Charles "Buddy" Rogers as Kenneth Raleigh
- Charles Richman as Andrew Raleigh
- Robert Gleckler as Mike Caruso
- Harry Shannon as bartender
