= Hold on to Your Hats (disambiguation) =

Hold On to Your Hats is a 1940 American musical comedy. The title may also refer to:

- "Hold on to Your Hats", a 1981 song by Slade
- "Hold On To Your Hat", a 1989 song by The Rolling Stones
- "Hold On To Your Hat", a 2013 song by the American band Eels
- "Hold On To Your Hats", a 2014 song by Derek Ryan (singer)
