= Follow Thru =

1930 film by Lloyd Corrigan

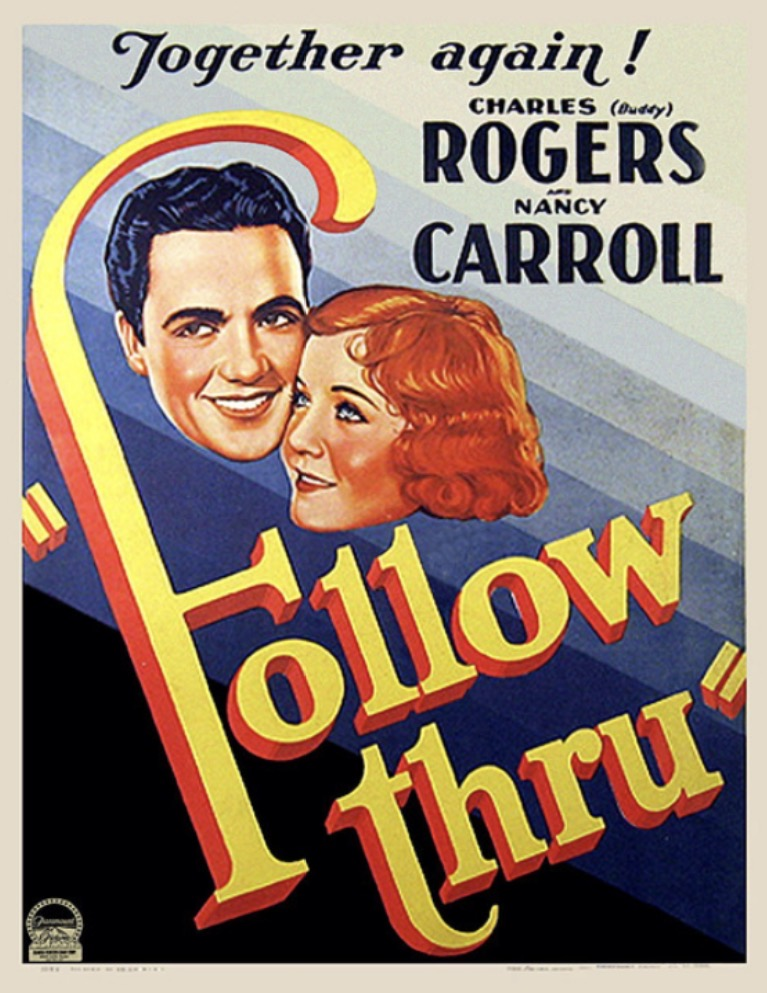
- Theatrical release poster
- Directed by: Laurence Schwab; Lloyd Corrigan
- Screenplay by: Laurence Schwab; Lloyd Corrigan
- Based on: Follow Thru (1929 Broadway musical) by Lew Brown, B. G. DeSylva, Ray Henderson and Laurence Schwab
- Produced by: Laurence Schwab; Frank Mandel
- Starring: Charles "Buddy" Rogers; Nancy Carroll; Zelma O'Neal; Jack Haley; Eugene Pallette; Thelma Todd
- Cinematography: Henry W. Gerrard; Charles P. Boyle (Technicolor)
- Edited by: Alyson Shaffer
- Music by: Lew Brown; Buddy G. DeSylva; Ray Henderson; George Marion Jr. Richard A. Whiting; Richard Rodgers; Lorenz Hart; Ed Eliscu; Manning Sherwin; Vernon Duke; Irving Berlin.
- Production company: Paramount Pictures
- Distributed by: Paramount Pictures
- Release date: September 27, 1930 (U.S.)
- Running time: 92 minutes
- Country: United States
- Language: English

Follow Thru is a 1930 American pre-Code musical romantic comedy film photographed entirely in Technicolor. It was the second all-color, all-talking feature to be produced by Paramount Pictures. The film was based on the hit 1929 Broadway musical of the same name by Lew Brown, B. G. DeSylva, Ray Henderson and Laurence Schwab. The musical ran a total of 401 performances from January 9, 1929, to December 21, 1929. Jack Haley, Zelma O'Neal and Don Tomkins, who starred in the Broadway production, reprised their roles in the film version.

The film is one of dozens of musicals made in 1929 and 1930 following the advent of sound, and it is one of several to feature color cinematography. Though many of these films have been lost or were destroyed by the original studios, the original camera negative of Follow Thru survives in its entirety and in excellent condition. It has been preserved by the UCLA Film and Television Archive.

== Plot ==
Follow Thru (1930)

At the Mission Country Club in 1910, golf pro Mac Moore orders champagne to celebrate the birth of his child, whom he hopes to raise to be a champion golfer. When he learns that the newborn is a girl, he changes the order to beer.

Twenty years later, Mac's daughter Lora has entered the club tournament, but she loses to Ruth Van Horn, a champion from another club, and contemplates giving up golf. Jerry Downes, a golf pro, and his friend Jack Martin arrive at the club. Lora takes one look at Jerry and decides to stay in the game.

Meanwhile, Jack meets Lora's best friend, Angie, but is too flustered to make a move. (duet: "Button Up Your Overcoat") Jerry gives Lora golf lessons. (duet: "A Peach of a Pair") Babs and Dinty deny any romantic feelings for one another. (duet: "Then I'll Have Time for You")

A title card announces a change of scene: "The masquerade party - across the border"

At Ruth's housewarming party in Mexico, Angie sings "I Want to Be Bad", which evolves into a huge production number with dozens of dancing angels and devils, fire and smoke effects, and a little fire engine manned by children. Angry at Ruth's attempts to seduce Jerry, teetotaler Lora gets drunk, sings a reprise of "I Want to be Bad" and passes out. Jerry reprises "A Peach of a Pair". Jerry and Lora drive home. (duet: "It Must Be You")

New club member J.C. Effingham ("Effie"), the girdle magnate, agrees to help Jack recover a family ring he gave to Angie if Jack's father will stock Effie's girdles in his department stores. Effie and Jack infiltrate the ladies locker room disguised as plumbers. Jack gets the ring and the girl.

At another tournament, Lora, still upset with Jerry, gives him the cold shoulder and he walks away but Jack coaxes him back. On the 18th hole, Jerry steps in as Lora's caddy and she wins! Jerry walks away again. Jack and Angie encourage Jerry and Lora to make up so they can plan a double wedding. (reprise: "A Peach of a Pair")

== Cast ==
- Charles "Buddy" Rogers as Jerry Downes, golf pro
- Nancy Carroll as Lora Moore, Mac's daughter and club champion
- Zelma O'Neal as Angie Howard, Lora's friend and caddy
- Jack Haley as Jack Martin, department store heir and Jerry's golf student
- Eugene Pallette as J.C. Effingham, girdle manufacturer
- Thelma Todd as Mrs. Ruth Van Horn, wealthy widow and champion golfer
- Claude King as Mac Moore, golf pro and Lora's father
- Don Tomkins as Dinty Moore, Lora's teenage brother
- Albert Gran as Martin Bascomb, the club president
- Kathryn Givney as Mrs. Bascomb, his wife
- Margaret Lee as Babs Bascomb, their teenage daughter

== Songs ==
Of the twelve songs in the original Broadway production, only five were performed in the film.

- "A Peach of a Pair" by George Marion Jr. (lyrics), Richard A. Whiting (music)
- "It Must Be You" by Elwood Eliscu and Manning Sherwin (lyrics and music)
- "Then I'll Have Time for You," "I Want to be Bad" and "Button Up Your Overcoat" by Lew Brown and B. G. DeSylva (lyrics), Ray Henderson (music)

== Production ==
The film was shot in Los Angeles and Palm Springs. The extras who appear in golf course scenes had to be coached with regard to golf etiquette (when to applaud a strike, etc.). About two hundred extras were used for the climactic golf championship sequence.

== Preservation ==
For a long time, the film was believed to be lost, but a print was found in the 1990s and it was carefully restored and preserved by the UCLA Film and Television Archive. Follow Thru is slated for a blu-ray release featuring a brand-new restoration.

== See also ==
- List of early color feature films
