= America's Sweetheart (musical) =

America’s Sweetheart
- Sheet Music Cover (cropped)
- Music: Richard Rodgers
- Lyrics: Lorenz Hart
- Book: Herbert Fields
- Productions: 1931 Broadway

America's Sweetheart is a musical comedy with music by Richard Rodgers, lyrics by Lorenz Hart and book by Herbert Fields.

== Synopsis ==
The show is a Hollywood satire, and is mainly set in Los Angeles but with some scenes in Agua Caliente, Tijuana in Mexico and in the state of Tennessee. Two young lovers hitchhike to Hollywood to make their fortune. The girl hits it big and loses interest in her boyfriend, who hasn't fared as well. Later, the introduction of talking pictures reverses their fortunes, and the boyfriend's career eclipses the girlfriend's, but they make up.

== Production history ==
The book for America's Sweetheart was written by Herbert Fields, the music was written by Richard Rodgers, and Lorenz Hart wrote the lyrics. Rodgers and Hart opened seven other musicals together during the 1930s: Jumbo, On Your Toes, Babes in Arms, I'd Rather Be Right, I Married an Angel, The Boys from Syracuse, and Too Many Girls.

America's Sweetheart premiered on Broadway at the Broadhurst Theatre on February 10, 1931, and closed on June 6, 1931, after 135 performances. It was produced by Laurence Schwab and Frank Mandel, directed by Monty Woolley, with choreography and production supervision by Bobby Connolly, with set design by Donald Oenslager and costume design by Charles Le Maire. The show starred Jack Whiting, Ann Sothern (using her real name Harriet Lake), Inez Courtney, and Virginia Bruce.

In 1977, Dorothy Hart, the sister of lyricist Lorenz Hart, put an ad in Variety asking for assistance in locating the lyrics for nine songs from America's Sweetheart that had been lost.

== Songs ==
=== Act 1 ===
- "Mr. Dolan Is Passing Through" (S. A. Dolan, Executives and Ensemble)
- "In Califor-n-i-a" (Dorith, Paula and Movie Actresses)
- "My Sweet" (Madge Farrell and Larry Pitkin)
- "I've Got Five Dollars" (Geraldine March and Michael Perry)
- "I've Got Five Dollars (Reprise)" (Geraldine March and Michael Perry)
- "Sweet Geraldine" (Georgia, Georgiana and Georgette)
- "There's So Much More" (Denise Torel and Larry Pitkin)
- "We'll Be the Same" (Geraldine March, Michael Perry and Ensemble)
- "We'll Be the Same (Reprise)" (Michael Perry and Larry Pitkin)
- "How About It" (Madge Farrell and Michael Perry)
- "Innocent Chorus Girls of Yesterday" (Movie Stars)
- "A Lady Must Live" (Denise Torel)

=== Act 2 ===
- "You Ain't Got No Savoir Faire" (Madge Farrell and Larry Pitkin)
- "Two Unfortunate Orphans" (Paula, Dorith and Ensemble)
- "I Want a Man" (Denise Torel)
- "Tennessee Dan" (Georgia, Georgiana and Georgette)
- "How About It (Reprise)" (Denise Torel, Michael Perry, Larry Pitkin and Ensemble)
- "Reprise - Finale" (Geraldine and Michael)

== Cast ==
	1931 Broadway
S.A. Dolan	John Sheehan
Larry Pitkin	Gus Shy
Madge Farrell	Inez Courtney
Michael Perry	Jack Whiting
Geraldine March	Harriette Lake (Ann Sothern)
Denise Torel	Jeanne Aubert
Paula	Vera Marsh
Dorith	Dorothy Dare
Lottie	Sue Moore
Miss Mulligan	Virginia Bruce
Telephone Operator	Alice Burrage
Dolores	Francetta Malloy
Stenographer	Terry Carroll
Mr. Corrigan	Frank Dow
Mr. Clark	Fred Shawn
Mr. Goulding	Herbert Hall
Mr. Butler	Budd Clark
Mr. McCary	Chas Fowler
Booking Agent	Al Downing
Georgia/Georgianna/Georgette	Hilda Forman, Louise Forman, Maxine Forman
Radio Announcer	Raoul DeTisne
Policeman	O.J. Vanase
