= Hold Everything! =

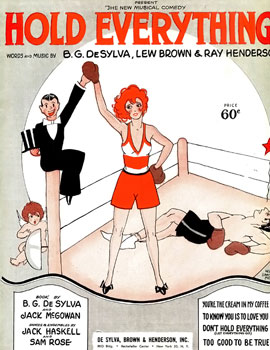
- Sheet music cover (cropped)
- Music: Ray Henderson
- Lyrics: Lew Brown and B. G. de Sylva
- Book: John McGowan and B. G. de Sylva
- Productions: 1928 Broadway

Hold Everything! is a musical comedy with lyrics by Lew Brown and B. G. de Sylva, music by Ray Henderson, and has an accompanying book by John McGowan and B. G. de Sylva. A musical about professional boxing, the work's central character is welterweight Sonny Jim Brooks. The musical takes place at "Pop" O'Keefe's Training Camp on Long Island; at the Hotel Wood; and at Madison Square Garden, New York.

Produced by Alex A. Aarons and Vinton Freedley, the Broadway production opened on 10 October 1928 at the Broadhurst Theatre for a total run of 409 performances. The cast included Jack Whiting as Sonny Jim Brooks, Bert Lahr as Brooks' sidekick, Gink Schiner; Ona Munson as Brooks' love interest, Sue Burke; Betty Compton as high society dame and villainess Norine Lloyd, Edmund Elton as "Pop" O'Keefe, and Victor Moore as "Nosey" Bartlett.

Bert Lahr had a critical triumph with this production which made him a star. The most famous song from the show is "You're the Cream in My Coffee". In 1930, Warner Bros. Pictures produced a movie version Hold Everything filmed entirely in Technicolor, however, only the soundtrack survives.

== Songs ==
Act I

- We’re Calling on Mr. Brooks
- An Outdoor man for My Indoor Sports
- Footwork
- You're the Cream in My Coffee
- When I Love, I Love
- Too Good To Be True
- To Know You Is To Love You
- Don't Hold Everything

Act II

- For Sweet Charity's Sake
- Genealogy
- Oh, Gosh
- It's All Over but the Shoutin’
