= Follow Thru (musical) =

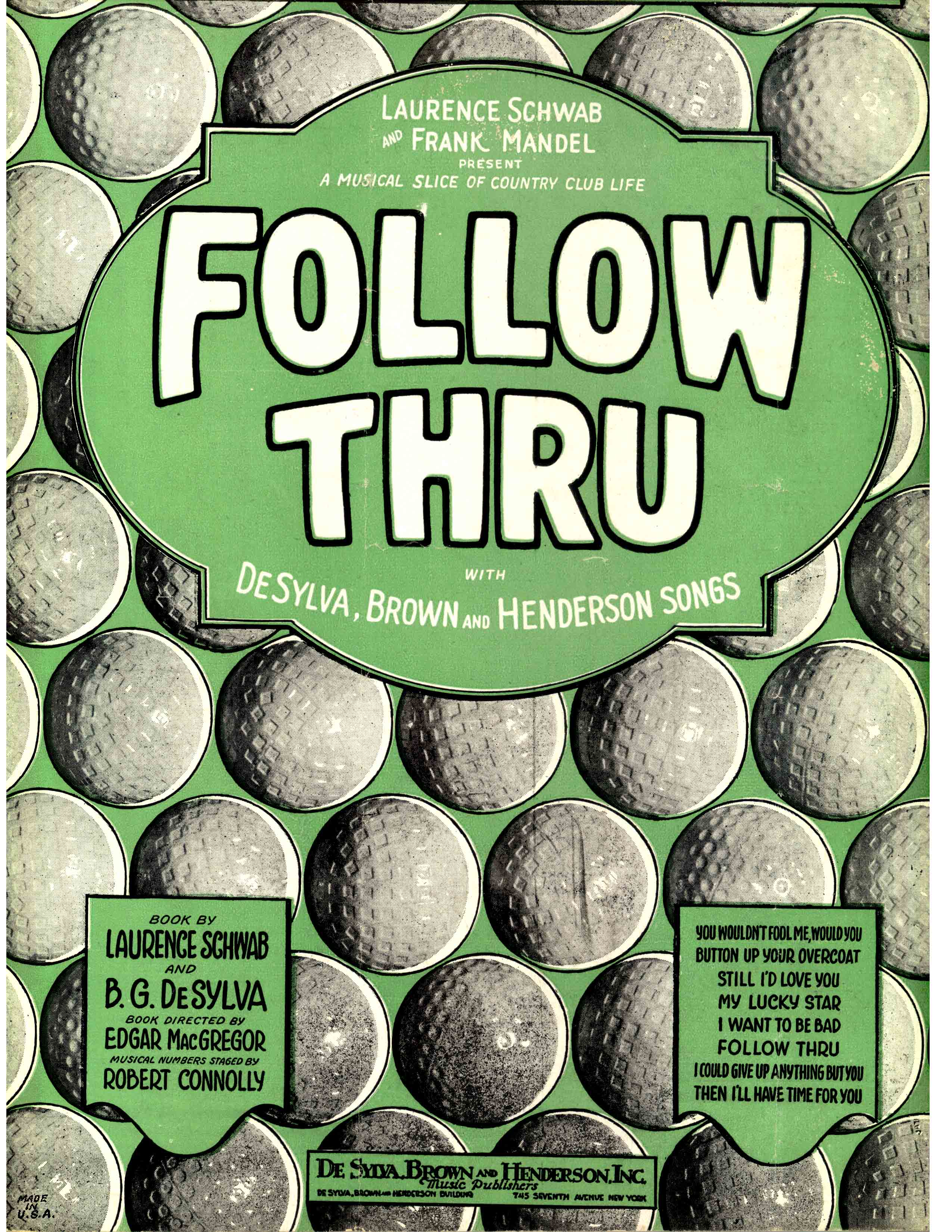
- Sheet music cover (cropped)
- Music: Ray Henderson
- Lyrics: Lew Brown and B. G. de Sylva
- Book: Laurence Schwab and B. G. de Sylva
- Productions: 1929 Broadway

Follow Thru is a musical comedy with book by B. G. DeSylva and Laurence Schwab, lyrics by B. G. DeSylva and Lew Brown, and music by Ray Henderson.

Produced by Laurence Schwab and Frank Mandel, the Broadway production opened on January 9, 1929 at the Chanin's 46th St. Theatre and ran through December 21, 1929 for a total run of 401 performances. The show was directed by Edgar MacGregor, choreographed by Bobby Connolly, and used set designs by Donald Oenslager. The cast included Lilian Bond, Jack Haley, Zelma O’Neal, John Barker and Eleanor Powell.

Called “a musical slice of country club life”, the plot involved a golf match at a country club. This was the first Broadway success for Eleanor Powell. The show produced several songs that are now standards, including “Button Up Your Overcoat”, “My Lucky Star”, and “I Want to be Bad”.

== Cast ==
The opening night cast:

- Arthur Aylesworth as Mac Moore, a golf professional
- Don Tomkins as Thomas Darcy "Dinty" Moore, his sixteen-year-old son
- Irene Delroy as Lora Moore, his daughter
- Zelma O'Neal as Angie Howard, her girl-friend
- Frank Kingdon as Martin Bascomb, president of the Bound Brook Country Club
- Edith Campbell as Mrs. Bascomb, the president's wife
- Margaret Lee as Babs Bascomb, their fifteen-year-old daughter
- John Sheehan as J.C. Effingham, a new member
- John Barker as Jerry Downs, a young golf champion
- Jack Haley as Jack Martin, Jerry's friend
- Madeline Cameron as Ruth Van Horn, an amateur golf champion
- Eleanor Powell as Molly

== Musical Numbers ==
Act I

Scene I: The Bound Brook Country Club, 1908

- Opening: The Daring Gibson Girl/The 1908 Life - Ensemble
- Old Fashioned Dance - Cynthia and Ensemble

Scene II: On the Golf Links, 1928

- It's a Great Sport - Babs, Ruth, Lora and Ensemble

Scene III: At the Sun Porch

- My Lucky Star - Jerry and Girls
- Button Up Your Overcoat - Angie and Jack
- You Wouldn't Fool Me, Would Ya? - Lora and Jerry

Scene IV: Where the Bushes Are Thickest Scene V: In Front of the Clubhouse

- He's a Man's Man - Ruth and Ensemble
- Then I'll have Time for you - Babs and Dinty
- I Want To Be Bad - Angie
- Finaletto - Lora and Jerry

Act II

Scene I: In Front of the Clubhouse

- We Couldn't Miss this Match - Chorus
- If There Were No More You - Lora and Jerry
- I Could Give Up Anything But You - Jack and Angie
- Follow Thru - Ruth and Ensemble

Scene II: Near the Clubhouse

Scene III: The Ladies's Locker Room

Scene IV: On the Fourteenth Hole

Scene V: On the Eighteenth Hole

Scene VI: Where the Bushes are Thickest

- I Could Give Up Anything But You - Angie and Jack

Scene VII: The Gate

- Finale: You Wouldn't Fool Would Me, Would Ya? - Entire Company
