= Take a Chance (musical) =

1932 musical

- Original Broadway program
- Music: Nacio Herb Brown; Richard A. Whiting; Vincent Youmans
- Lyrics: B. G. De Sylva
- Book: B. G. De Sylva and Laurence Schwab
- Productions: 1932 Broadway

Take a Chance (1932) is a musical with lyrics by B. G. De Sylva and music by Nacio Herb Brown and Richard A. Whiting, with additional songs by Vincent Youmans, and book by De Sylva and Laurence Schwab.

== Background ==
Take a Chance started as a musical titled Humpty Dumpty written by DeSylva and Schwab, which flopped immediately during out-of town tryouts in Pittsburgh, Pennsylvania, where it had opened on September 26, 1932. The musical was extensively rewritten, and composer Vincent Youmans was brought in to contribute to the score. After further tryouts in Philadelphia, Wilmington, Delaware, and Newark, New Jersey, the musical was renamed, and the book, music, and cast had changed, leaving only Ethel Merman. Composer Richard Whiting subsequently left the production.

== Production ==
The musical opened on Broadway at the Apollo Theatre on November 26, 1932 and closed on July 1, 1933 after 243 performances. Directed by Edgar MacGregor with choreography by Bobby Connolly, the show starred Ethel Merman as Wanda Brill and featured Jack Haley as Duke Stanley, Jack Whiting as Kenneth Raleigh, June Knight as Toni Ray, and Sid Silvers as Louie Webb. Merman's vocal arrangements were by Roger Edens. Merman introduced the popular hit Eadie Was a Lady.

== Synopsis ==
Two small-time gamblers, Duke Stanley and Louie Webb, leave their carnival circuit to seek greater fortunes in the legitimate theater. Their friend Toni Ray wants to be a singer and her Harvard-educated boyfriend, Kenneth Raleigh, also wants to enter show business. They meet a no-nonsense nightclub singer, Wanda Brill. Wanda performs a risque number in a New Orleans club in a red dress and black boa ("Eadie Was a Lady").

== Songs ==
Act 1

- "The Life of the Party" (music by Vincent Youmans) – Night Club Girls and Guests
- "Should I Be Sweet" (music by Vincent Youmans) – Toni Ray
- "So Do I" (music by Vincent Youmans) – Kenneth Raleigh, Toni Ray and Guests
- "I Got Religion" – Wanda Brill
- "She's Nuts About Me" – Duke Stanley
- "Tickled Pink" – Kenneth Raleigh and Girls
- "Turn Out the Light" – Louie Webb, Duke Stanley, Toni Ray, Kenneth Raleigh and Girls
- "Charity" (music by Vincent Youmans) – Guests
- "(Oh, How) I Long to Belong to You" (music by Vincent Youmans) – Kenneth Raleigh and Toni Ray
- "Rise and Shine" (music by Vincent Youmans) – Wanda Brill and Ensemble

Act 2

- "Tonight Is Opening Night" (music by Vincent Youmans)– Ensemble
- "You're an Old Smoothie" – Duke Stanley and Wanda Brill
- "Eadie Was a Lady" – Wanda Brill and Ensemble
- "Should I Be Sweet (Revue Version)" (music by Vincent Youmans) – Toni Ray

== 1933 Film ==
In 1933, the show was made into a film with almost no resemblance to the original show, except for the song "Eadie Was a Lady" and "Should I Be Sweet". It is remembered chiefly as the film in which "It's Only a Paper Moon," written by Harold Arlen, E. Y. Harburg, and Billy Rose, appeared for the first time under that name. Lillian Roth played Merman's role in the film.
