= Good News (1930 film) =

1930 film

- Theatrical release poster
- Directed by: Nick Grinde
- Written by: Frances Marion (scenario)
- Based on: Good News (musical) by: Laurence Schwab; Lew Brown; Frank Mandel; B.G. DeSylva
- Starring: Bessie Love; Cliff Edwards; Penny Singleton
- Cinematography: Percy Hilburn
- Edited by: William LeVanway
- Production company: Metro-Goldwyn-Mayer
- Release date: August 23, 1930 (U.S.)
- Running time: 78 minutes
- Country: United States
- Language: English

Good News is a 1930 American pre-Code musical film directed by Nick Grinde, and starring Bessie Love, Cliff Edwards, and Penny Singleton. The film was shot in black-and-white, although the finale was in multicolor.

The film is preserved at the UCLA Film & Television Archive. The surviving print lacks the color finale; no footage of the finale is known to survive.

The film was based on the 1927 stage production of the same name. Another film based on the musical, also called Good News, was released in 1947. By the 1940s, the 1930 production was not shown in the United States due to its Pre-Code content, which included sexual innuendo and lewd suggestive humor.

== Plot ==
College student Connie Lane falls for campus football star Tom Marlowe, but his bad grades threaten to make him miss the big game. Professor Kenyon helps Tom academically, and Tom is able to play in the big game and lead the team to victory.

== Cast ==
- Bessie Love as Babe
- Cliff Edwards as "Pooch" Kearney
- Mary Lawlor as Connie Lane
- Stanley Smith as Tom Marlowe
- Gus Shy as Bobbie Randall
- Lola Lane as Patricia Bingham
- Thomas E. Jackson as Coach Bill Johnson
- Delmer Daves as Beef Saunders
- Billy Taft as Sylvester
- Frank McGlynn Sr. as Professor Kenyon
- Penny Singleton as Flo
- Helyn Virgil as girl
- Vera Marshe as blonde girl

== Songs ==
- "He's a Lady's Man" by Lew Brown, B.G. DeSylva, and Ray Henderson
- "The Best Things in Life Are Free" by Lew Brown, B.G. DeSylva, and Ray Henderson
- "Varsity Drag" by Lew Brown, B.G. DeSylva, and Ray Henderson
- "Good News" by Lew Brown, B.G. DeSylva, and Ray Henderson
- "Tait Song" by Lew Brown
- "Students Are We" by Lew Brown
- "If You're Not Kissing Me" by Arthur Freed and Nacio Herb Brown
- "Football" by Arthur Freed and Nacio Herb Brown
- "I Feel Pessimistic" by J. Russel Robinson and George Waggner
- "I'd Like to Make You Happy" by Reggie Montgomery

== Reception ==
Although it received mixed reviews – deemed "trivial and unreal" by one reviewer and "inferior to the stage production" by another – the cast received positive reviews, particularly Bessie Love.

== See also ==
- List of early color feature films
- List of incomplete or partially lost films
