= You're the Cream in My Coffee =

- Sheet music, 1928

Song
- Published: 1928
- Composer: Ray Henderson
- Lyricists: Buddy G. DeSylva; Lew Brown

"You're the Cream in My Coffee"
1928 recording featuring Annette Hanshaw

"You're the Cream in My Coffee" is a popular song published in 1928. Hit recordings were by Annette Hanshaw, Ben Selvin (vocal by Jack Palmer), Ted Weems (vocal by Parker Gibbs) and Ruth Etting.

The music was written by Ray Henderson, with lyrics by Buddy G. DeSylva and Lew Brown and appears in their Broadway musical Hold Everything!, where it was introduced by Ona Munson and Jack Whiting. It is also featured in Warner Bros. Pictures' early two-color film version of the musical in 1930, starring Joe E. Brown when it was sung by Georges Carpentier and chorus.

As with most DeSylva, Brown and Henderson hit songs the tune is melodically infectious with unexpected lyric couplets that are still easy to recall. It is also notable for a simple but ingenious bridge (middle eight bars) of continually ascending steps with closely syncopated lyrics.

The song was also recorded by Gay Ellis and Her Novelty Orchestra (aka Annette Hanshaw) in 1928. It was later covered by Les Brown, The King Cole Trio, Chris Connor (with the Jerry Wald Orchestra), the Ray Conniff Singers, and many others.

Marlene Dietrich sang the song in her screen test for The Blue Angel, her breakthrough role. She later recorded the song on her album "Dietrich in Rio" in 1959.

The song provided a backdrop for the 1980 television play Cream in My Coffee by English dramatist Dennis Potter.

This song was used as the theme song for The Mrs Bradley Mysteries in 2000 and it was recorded by BBC Records and sung by Graham Dalby and The Grahamophones in a re-creation of Jack Hylton's 1928 version.

Broadway actress Carol Channing recorded the song for her 1994 album Jazz Baby. The song was also recorded by Seth MacFarlane on his debut album, Music Is Better Than Words.

In addition, it is interpolated with other D-B-H hits in the revised 1993 version of the songwriters’ most popular musical Good News when Coach Bill Johnson awkwardly reveals his romantic interest in a colleague (“I’m not a poet - how well I know it”, 1st line of song's 1993 intro).

The original lyrics and music of the song entered the public domain in the United States in 2024.
