= Donald Oenslager =

American scenic designer

- Born: March 7, 1902; Harrisburg, Pennsylvania, U.S.
- Died: June 11, 1975 (aged 73)
- Occupation: Scenic designer
- Relatives: Beatrice Oenslager Chace (sister); George Oenslager (uncle)

Donald Oenslager (March 7, 1902 – June 11, 1975) was an American scenic designer who won the Tony Award for Best Scenic Design.

== Biography ==
Oenslager was born in Harrisburg, Pennsylvania on March 7, 1902. He graduated from the Harrisburg Academy prior to attending Harvard University. At Harvard he served as art director of the Harvard Dramatic Club (HDC) his senior year, and designed both costumes and sets for many HDC productions He also studied drama at the university with George Pierce Baker. He graduated from Harvard in 1923, and then studied in Europe for one year after winning Sachs Fellow.

His first work as designer was for the ballet "Sooner or Later" in 1925. He had started as an actor in the 1920s at the Greenwich Village Theatre and the Harrisburg Playhouse.

He designed sets and often lighting for more than 140 Broadway productions between 1925 and 1975. In 1959 he was awarded the Tony Award for Best Scenic Design for his work on Leonard Spigelgass's play A Majority of One. He had received a Tony nomination two years earlier for his work on the play Major Barbara.

He taught scenic design at the Yale School of Drama for many years and the institution continues to award an annual scholarship for stage design in his name. Among his notable pupils was John Lee Beatty.

Oenslager's papers are held by the New York Public Library for the Performing Arts, although a number of his scenic design sketches are part of the permanent collection at the Museum of the City of New York. The Museum had an exhibition of his designs in 2008.

He brought "a new emphasis on symbolism over realism to American theater design."

== Selected works ==
- Good News (1927)
- The New Moon (1928)
- Follow Thru (1929)
- Girl Crazy (1930)
- You Said It (1931)
- America's Sweetheart (1931)
- Anything Goes (1934)
- The Farmer Takes a Wife (1934)
- First Lady (1935)
- Stage Door (1936)
- Red, Hot and Blue (1936)
- Johnny Johnson (1936)
- You Can't Take It with You (1936)
- I'd Rather Be Right (1937)
- Skylark (1939)
- The Man Who Came to Dinner (1939)
- My Dear Children (1940)
- Claudia (1941)
- Born Yesterday (1946)
- Present Laughter (1946)
- Park Avenue (1946)
- The Fatal Weakness (1946)
- Years Ago (1946)
- Angel in the Wings (1947)
- Life With Mother (1948)
- Goodbye, My Fancy (1948)
- The Rat Race (1949)
- The Velvet Glove (1949)
- The Liar (1950)
- Sabrina Fair (1953)
- The Prescott Proposals (1953)
- Dear Charles (1954)
- Janus (1955)
- Major Barbara (1957)
- The Pleasure of His Company (1958)
- The Marriage-Go-Round (1958)
- A Majority of One (1959)
- A Far Country (1961)
- A Case of Libel (1963)
- Spofford (1967)
