= Bing Sings Whilst Bregman Swings =

Studio album by Bing Crosby
- Released: 1956
- Recorded: June 11–12, 1956
- Genre: Vocal
- Length: 36:24
- Label: Verve
- Producer: Buddy Bregman

Bing Crosby chronology
Songs I Wish I Had Sung the First Time Around (1956)	Bing Sings Whilst Bregman Swings (1956)	High Society (1956)

Bing Sings Whilst Bregman Swings is the nineteenth solo studio album by American singer and actor Bing Crosby. It was Crosby’s sixth LP, his first album for Verve, recorded and released in a mono format in 1956.

Bing Sings Whilst Bregman Swings was a stylistic departure for Crosby, marking the first time he recorded an album with an orchestra similar to Songs for Swingin' Lovers! by Frank Sinatra, an album recorded with Nelson Riddle and released earlier the same year by Capitol Records. The songs are also among the few that Crosby had never recorded. Buddy Bregman contributed the orchestrations, conducted a hand-picked group of Hollywood's foremost musicians, and came up with the idea of the album.

In an interview with In Tune International magazine in 2001, Bregman said, "Yes, this was my idea. Bing was at the end of his long contract with Decca, and although he re-signed, it was on a non-exclusive basis, which meant he was free to record with whom he chose. I'd recently worked with Gary Crosby on a Decca session and become friendly with him and I had Bing's private home telephone number so I rang him to ask about doing an album with me at Verve. I went over to the house and played some things over to him on the piano. He agreed to do it and a deal was worked out, and I was given carte blanche with the arrangements and musicians. He didn't even insist on his regular pianist Buddy Cole being on the date. The only thing Bing stipulated was that he had to record at nine o'clock in the morning, because his voice was best at that time of day."

The album was released on CD by Verve in 2001.

== Reception ==
A reviewer for Variety wrote, "Bing Crosby's first wax trip away from Decca in more than 20 years is a happy musical excursion...Altogether it is quite a musical package - muscular and tender, driving and romantic, pulsating and lyrical. For Bing Crosby, the artist, it is a somewhat different testament to add to the many already on record and, as you will hear, an ingeniously varied and durable one."

Billboard liked it, too, saying, "This is Bing's first album on Verve, and he draws support from a modern, swinging group of musicians. – The package contains a list of great tunes which Bing never recorded before; reason enough to make this attractive to the faithful. Tunes include 'Mountain Greenery', 'Blue Room', 'Have You Met Miss Jones', and other great ones, most dating from the golden age of show music. Bregman orchestrated the songs brightly, and Bing sings them with his casual charm and technical perfection."

In its review Time magazine said, "After 22 years of making records for Decca — plus a few before even Decca latched onto him — Bing Crosby steps out with a handful of oldies on a new label, proves himself virtually indestructible. It is only when he tries to swing too high that he begins to sound his age (52)."

Record producer Ken Barnes, wrote, "This popular album has been re-issued many times on various labels over the years. As an example of Crosby's art it is something of an enigma. On the one hand the choice of songs is impeccable – beautifully written standards like 'They All Laughed,' 'The Song Is You,' 'Have You Met Miss Jones', and 'September in the Rain' and Bing's singing, for the most part, is exemplary. But, on the other hand, it is very difficult to accept Buddy Bregman seriously as a reliable orchestral accompanist. His writing can be reasonably tasteful on tracks like 'They All Laughed,' 'Mountain Greenery', and 'The Blue Room', but his brass scoring is ham–fisted and bitterly distracting in 'Cheek to Cheek' and 'I've Got Five Dollars'. And one wonders how Bing ever managed to stay on pitch in the middle of 'Heat Wave' where Bregman has the orchestra playing suspect chords. Despite all these faults, it was refreshing at the time to hear Crosby with a modern-sounding orchestra and while this album is no match for Sinatra's 'Songs for Swingin' Lovers' classic LP, it was a step – albeit a hesitant one – in the right direction."

== Track listing ==
Side one
No.	Title	Writer(s)	Length
1.	"The Song Is You"	Oscar Hammerstein II, Jerome Kern	3:55
2.	"Mountain Greenery"	Richard Rodgers, Lorenz Hart	3:38
3.	"Cheek to Cheek"	Irving Berlin	4:02
4.	"'Deed I Do"	Walter Hirsch, Fred Rose	2:51
5.	"Heat Wave"	Irving Berlin	3:01
6.	"Blue Room"	Richard Rodgers, Lorenz Hart	2:23

Side two
No.	Title	Writer(s)	Length
1.	"Have You Met Miss Jones?"	Richard Rodgers, Lorenz Hart	2:30
2.	"I've Got Five Dollars"	Richard Rodgers, Lorenz Hart	3:15
3.	"They All Laughed"	George Gershwin, Ira Gershwin	2:42
4.	"Nice Work If You Can Get It"	George Gershwin, Ira Gershwin	2:36
5.	"September in the Rain"	Al Dubin, Harry Warren	2:58
6.	"Jeepers Creepers"	Johnny Mercer, Harry Warren	2:33

== Personnel ==
Conrad Gozzo, Pete Candoli, Harry "Sweets" Edison, Maynard Ferguson (trumpets); Francis Howard, George Ulyate, Milt Bernhardt, George Roberts (trombones); Bud Shank, Maurice Stein, Ted Nash, Bob Cooper, Chuck Gentry (saxophones); Paul Smith (piano); Barney Kessel (guitar); Joe Mondragon (bass); Alvin Stoller (drums).
