= Laurence Schwab =

American film producer (1893–1951)

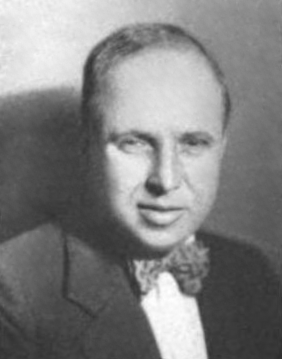
- Born: 1893; Boston, Massachusetts, US
- Died: May 29, 1951 (aged 57–58); Southampton, New York, US
- Education: Harvard University
- Occupations: Producer, writer, director

Laurence Schwab (1893 – May 29, 1951) was an American theater and film producer, writer, and director. He was born in Boston and attended Harvard University. His first success was as co-producer of The Gingham Girl (1922). He co-authored and produced numerous productions in the 1920s and 1930s. Several of his works were adapted to film.

== Biography ==
Laurence Schwab was born in Boston, and was educated at Harvard.

He died in Southampton, New York on May 29, 1951.

== Theater ==
=== Writer ===
- Queen High (1926), adapted from Edward Peple's 1914 farce
- Good News (1927)
- The New Moon (1927), co-wrote
- Follow Thru (1930), co-wrote
- Take a Chance (1932), co-wrote

=== Producer ===
- America's Sweetheart (1931)

== Filmography ==
=== Writer ===
- Follow Thru (1930), adaptation of his play, he also produced
- Good News based on musical he co-wrote
- Queen High (1930), adaptatiom of his play
- I Won't Play (1944)
- Good News adapted from a play he co-wrote
- The Desert Song adapted from a play he co-wrote

=== Directing ===
- Take a Chance, co-directed
