= Vincent Youmans =

American composer (1898–1946)

Background information
- Born: Vincent Millie Youmans; September 27, 1898; New York City, U.S.
- Died: April 5, 1946 (aged 47) Denver, Colorado, U.S.
- Occupations: Broadway composer, Broadway producer, song publisher

Vincent Millie Youmans (September 27, 1898 – April 5, 1946) was an American Broadway composer and producer.

A leading Broadway composer of his day, Youmans collaborated with virtually all the greatest lyricists on Broadway: Ira Gershwin, Otto Harbach, Oscar Hammerstein II, Irving Caesar, Anne Caldwell, Leo Robin, Howard Dietz, Clifford Grey, Billy Rose, Edward Eliscu, Edward Heyman, Harold Adamson, Buddy DeSylva and Gus Kahn. Youmans' early songs are remarkable for their economy of melodic material: two-, three- or four-note phrases are constantly repeated and varied by subtle harmonic or rhythmic changes. In later years, however, he turned to longer musical sentences and more rhapsodic melodic lines. Youmans published fewer than 100 songs, but 18 of these were considered standards by ASCAP, a remarkably high percentage.

== Biography ==
Youmans was born in New York City, United States, into a prosperous family of hat makers. When he was two, his father moved the family to upper-class Larchmont, New York. Youmans attended the Trinity School in Mamaroneck, New York, and Heathcote Hall in Rye, New York. His ambition was initially to become an engineer, and he attended Yale University for a short time. He dropped out to become a runner for a Wall Street brokerage firm, but was soon drafted in the Navy during World War I, although he saw no combat. While stationed in Illinois, he took an interest in the theater and began producing troop shows for the Navy.

After the war, Youmans was a Tin Pan Alley song-plugger for Jerome H. Remick Music Publishers, and then a rehearsal pianist for composer Victor Herbert’s operettas. In 1921, he collaborated with lyricist Ira Gershwin on the score for Two Little Girls in Blue, which brought him his first Broadway composing credit, and his first hit song "Oh Me! Oh My!", and a contract with T. B. Harms. His next show was Wildflower (1923), with lyrics by Otto Harbach and Oscar Hammerstein II, which was a major success. His most enduring success was No, No, Nanette, with lyrics by Irving Caesar, which reached Broadway in 1925 after an unprecedented try-out in Chicago and subsequent national and international tours. No, No Nanette was the biggest musical-comedy success of the 1920s in both Europe and the US and his two songs "Tea for Two" and "I Want to Be Happy" were worldwide hits. Both songs are considered standards. "Tea For Two" was consistently ranked among the most recorded popular songs for decades.

In 1927, Youmans began producing his own Broadway shows. He also left his publisher TB Harms Company and began publishing his own songs. He had a major success with Hit the Deck! (1927), which included the hit songs "Sometimes I'm Happy" and "Hallelujah". His subsequent productions after 1927 were failures, despite the song hits they featured ("Great Day and "Without a Song" from Great Day (1929), "Time On My Hands" from Smiles (1930) (Youmans is also known as whistling on the song originally), and the title song from Through the Years). His last contributions to Broadway were additional songs for Take a Chance (1932).

In 1933, Youmans wrote the songs for Flying Down to Rio, the first film to feature Fred Astaire and Ginger Rogers as a featured dancing pair. His score contained "Orchids in the Moonlight", "The Carioca", "Music Makes Me", and the title song. The film was a tremendous hit, and it revived the composer's professional prospects, though he never again wrote for Astaire/Rogers.

After a professional career of only 13 years, Youmans was forced into retirement in 1934 after contracting tuberculosis. He spent the remainder of his life battling the disease. His only return to Broadway was to mount an ill-fated extravaganza entitled Vincent Youmans' Ballet Revue (1943), an ambitious mix of Latin-American and classical music, including Ravel's Daphnis et Chloé. Choreographed by Leonide Massine. The production lost some $4 million.

== Private life ==
Youmans married chorus performer Anne Varley on February 7, 1927. Their twins, Vincent Jr. and Cecily, were born on August 16, 1927.

Anne filed for divorce just five days after the birth of her children. During the subsequent legal battle, Youmans denied fathering his two children. In May 1933, his apartment in New York City was broken into by two private detectives hired by Varley. They found extensive evidence of his adultery. Youmans stopped contesting the divorce, and it was granted on November 25, 1933.

Youmans was an alcoholic and a member of the Lost Generation. He was a lifelong heavy drinker and partier, and well-known for womanizing. The drinking impaired his health, and he contracted tuberculosis in 1932. It went into remission for two years, but the disease recurred in 1934.

Youmans married chorus performer Mildred Boots on October 22, 1935. She filed for divorce in Reno, Nevada, on January 19, 1946, citing grounds of "mental cruelty". The divorce was granted two days later after Youmans did not contest it.

== Death and legacy ==
Youmans died of tuberculosis on April 5, 1946, at a hotel in Denver, Colorado. Mary Chase, author of the 1944 Broadway play Harvey, was at his beside.

At the time of his death, Youmans left behind a large quantity of unpublished material. In 1970, Youmans was posthumously inducted into the Songwriters Hall of Fame. In 1971, No, No Nanette enjoyed a notable Broadway revival starring Ruby Keeler, and choreographed by Busby Berkeley, which was widely credited with beginning the nostalgia era on Broadway. In 1983, he was inducted into the American Theater Hall of Fame.

== Broadway musicals with music by Vincent Youmans ==
- Two Little Girls in Blue (1921)
- Wildflower (1923)
- Mary Jane McKane (1923)
- Lollipop (1924)
- No, No, Nanette (1925, revived 1971)
- Oh, Please! (1926)
- Hit the Deck (1927)
- Rainbow (1928)
- A Night in Venice (1929)
- Great Day! (1929)
- Smiles (1930)
- Through the Years (1932)
- Take a Chance (1932); additional songs only
- The Vincent Youmans Ballet Revue (1943)

== Films with music by Vincent Youmans ==
- No, No, Nanette (1930)
- Hit the Deck (1930)
- Song of the West (1930)
- What a Widow! (1930)
- Take a Chance (1933)
- Flying Down to Rio (1933)
- No, No, Nanette (1940)
- Tea for Two (1950)
- Hit the Deck (1955)

== Songs ==
- "An Invitation" with lyrics by Edward Heyman
- "An Orphan Is the Girl for Me" with lyrics by Zelda Sears and Walter De Leon
- "Anyway, We Had Fun" with lyrics by Ring Lardner
- "April Blossoms" with help from Herbert Stothart and lyrics by Otto Harbach and Oscar Hammerstein II
- "Armful of You" with lyrics by Clifford Grey and Leo Robin
- "Bambalina" with help from Herbert Stothart and lyrics by Otto Harbach and Oscar Hammerstein II
- "Be Good to Me" with lyrics by Ring Lardner
- "Blue Bowery" with lyrics by Clifford Grey and Harold Adamson
- "Bo Koo" with lyrics by Zelda Sears and Walter De Leon
- "The Boy next Door" with lyrics by Otto Harbach and Schuyler Greene
- "The Bride Was Dressed in White" with lyrics by Oscar Hammerstein II
- "The Call of the Sea" with lyrics by Otto Harbach and Irving Caesar
- "Carioca" with lyrics by Gus Kahn and Edward Eliscu: Academy Award Nomination for Best Original Song
- "Carry on Keep Smiling" with lyrics by Harold Adamson
- "The Chinese Party" with lyrics by Clifford Grey and Harold Adamson
- "Come on and Pet Me" with lyrics by Oscar Hammerstein II and Otto Harbach
- "Course I Will" with help from Herbert Stothart and lyrics by Otto Harbach and Oscar Hammerstein II
- "Crystal Lady"
- "Dancing Wedding" with lyrics by Clifford Grey and Harold Adamson
- "The Deep Blue Sea" with lyrics by Irving Caesar and Otto Harbach
- "Deep in My Heart" with lyrics by Zelda Sears and Walter De Leon
- "Diamond in the Rough" with lyrics by Oscar Hammerstein II
- "Dolly" with lyrics by Ira Gershwin and Schuyler Greene
- "Does It Pay to Be a Lady?" with lyrics by William Rose and Edward Eliscu
- "Dress Parade" with lyrics by Otto Harbach and Irving Caesar
- "Drums in My Heart" with lyrics by Edward Heyman
- "Fight Over Me" with lyrics by Irving Caesar and Otto Harbach
- "Flappers Are We" with lyrics by Irving Caesar and Otto Harbach
- "Flying Down to Rio" with lyrics by Gus Kahn and Edward Eliscu
- "Going Rowing" with lyrics by Zelda Sears and Walter De Leon
- "Goodbye Little Rosebud" with help from Herbert Stothart and lyrics by Otto Harbach and Oscar Hammerstein II
- "Great Day" with lyrics by William Rose and Edward Eliscu
- "Hallelujah" with lyrics by Clifford Grey and Leo Robin
- "Happy Because I'm In Love" with lyrics by William Rose and Edward Eliscu
- "The Harbor of My Heart" with lyrics by Clifford Grey and Leo Robin
- "Hay Straw" with lyrics by Oscar Hammerstein II
- "Here, Steward" with lyrics by Ira Gershwin
- "Here's a Day to Be Happy" with lyrics by Clifford Grey and Harold Adamson
- "Honey Bun" with lyrics by Zelda Sears and Walter De Leon
- "Hotcha Ma Chotch" with lyrics by Clifford Grey and Harold Adamson
- "How Happy Is the Bride" with lyrics by Edward Heyman
- "I Know That You Know" with lyrics by Anne Caldwell
- "I Like What You Like" with lyrics by William Rose and Edward Eliscu
- "I Like You As You Are" with lyrics by Oscar Hammerstein II
- "I Want a Man" with lyrics by Oscar Hammerstein II
- "I Want to Be Happy" with lyrics by Otto Harbach and Irving Caesar
- "I Want to Be With You" with lyrics by Buddy De Sylva
- "If I Told You" with help from Herbert Stothart and lyrics by Otto Harbach and Oscar Hammerstein II
- "If I Were You" with lyrics by Ring Lardner
- "I'm Glad I Waited" with lyrics by Clifford Grey and Harold Adamson
- "I'll Come Back to You" with lyrics by Edward Heyman
- "It Must Be Love" with lyrics by Zelda Sears
- "It's Every Girl's Ambition" with lyrics by Edward Heyman
- "I've Confessed to the Breeze I Love You" with lyrics by Otto Harbach and Irving Caesar
- "Join the Navy" with lyrics by Clifford Grey and Leo Robin
- "Kathleen Mine" with lyrics by Edward Heyman
- "Keepin' Myself for You" with lyrics by Clifford Grey and Leo Robin
- "Kinda Like You" with lyrics by Edward Heyman
- "Kiss Or Two" with lyrics by Leo Robin
- "Lady From The Bayou" with lyrics by Leo Robin
- "Let Me Give All My Love to Thee" with lyrics by Oscar Hammerstein II
- "Like He Loves Me" with lyrics by Anne Caldwell
- "Loo Loo" with lyrics by Clifford Grey and Leo Robin
- "Love in a Cottage" with lyrics by Zelda Sears and Walter De Leon
- "Love Is Like A Song" with lyrics by J. Russel Robinson and George Waggner
- "Lucky Bird" with lyrics by Clifford Grey and Leo Robin
- "Mary Jane Mckane" with lyrics by William Carey Duncan and Oscar Hammerstein II
- "More Than You Know" with lyrics by Billy Rose and Edward Eliscu
- "Music Makes Me" with lyrics by Gus Kahn and Edward Eliscu
- "My Doctor" with lyrics by Irving Caesar and Otto Harbach
- "My Lover" with lyrics by Clifford Grey and Harold Adamson
- "My Mother Told Me" Not to Trust a Soldier with lyrics by Oscar Hammerstein II
- "Nicodemus" with lyrics by Anne Caldwell
- "No, No Nanette" with lyrics by Irving Caesar and Otto Harbach
- "Nothing Could Be Sweeter" with lyrics by Clifford Grey and Leo Robin
- "Oh, How I Long To Belong To You" with lyrics by Buddy De Sylva
- "Oh Me, Oh My, Oh You" with lyrics by Ira Gershwin
- "On the Golden Trail" with lyrics by Oscar Hammerstein II
- "The One Girl" with lyrics by Oscar Hammerstein II
- "One Love" with lyrics by William Rose and Edward Eliscu
- "Only a Moment Ago" with lyrics by Irving Caesar and Otto Harbach
- "Open Up Your Heart" with lyrics by William Rose and Edward Eliscu
- "Orchids in the Moonlight" with lyrics by Gus Kahn and Edward Eliscu
- "Orienta" with lyrics by Ira Gershwin
- "Pay Day Pauline" with lyrics by Irving Caesar and Otto Harbach
- "Peach on the Beach" with lyrics by Otto Harbach and Irving Caesar
- "Play the Game" with lyrics by William Rose and Edward Eliscu
- "Rally 'Round Me" with lyrics by Ring Lardner
- "Rice and Shoes" with lyrics by Ira Gershwin and Schulyer Greene
- "Rise N' Shine" with lyrics by Buddy De Sylva
- "The Road to Home" with lyrics by Edward Heyman
- "Santa Claus" with lyrics by Otto Harbach
- "Say Oui Cheri" with lyrics by J. Russel Robinson and George Waggner
- "Say Young Man Of Manhattan" with lyrics by Clifford Grey and Harold Adamson
- "Scarecrows" with lyrics by William Rose and Edward Eliscu
- "She's Innocent" with help from Paul Lannin and lyrics by Ira Gershwin
- "Shore Leave" with lyrics by Clifford Grey and Leo Robin
- "Should I Be Sweet" with lyrics by Buddy De Sylva
- "Si, Si, Si Senor" with lyrics by William Rose and Edward Eliscu
- "The Silly Season" with lyrics by Ira Gershwin
- "Soliloguy" with lyrics by Oscar Hammerstein II
- "Something to Sing About" with lyrics by Clifford Grey and Harold Adamson
- "Sometimes I'm Happy (Sometimes I'm Blue)" with lyrics by Irving Caesar
- "Sweet as Sugar Cane" with lyrics by William Rose and Edward Eliscu
- "Take a Little One Step with lyrics by Zelda Sears and Walter De Leon
- "Tea for Two" with lyrics by Irving Caesar
- "Telephone Girlie" with lyrics by Otto Harbach and Irving Caesar
- "There's Something About Me They Like" with lyrics by Arthur Francis and Fred Jackson
- "Through the Years" with lyrics by Edward Heyman
- "Tie a String Around Your Finger" with lyrics by Zelda Sears and Walter De Leon
- "Time and a Half for Overtime" with lyrics by Zelda Sears and Walter De Leon
- "Time on My Hands" with lyrics by Mack Gordon and Harold Adamson
- "Tom, Dick and Harry" with lyrics by Clifford Grey and Harold Adamson
- "Too Many Rings Around Rosie" with lyrics by Otto Harbach and Irving Caesar
- "The Trumpeteer and the Lover" with lyrics by Edward Heyman
- "Utopia" with lyrics by Clifford Grey and Leo Robin
- "Virginia" with lyrics by Oscar Hammerstein II
- "Waiting for You" with lyrics by Otto Harbach and Irving Caesar
- "Wedding Bells Ring On" with lyrics by William Rose and Edward Eliscu
- "(We're Off) On A Wonderful Trip" with lyrics by Ira Gershwin
- "We're Off to India" with lyrics by Ira Gershwin
- "What Can I Say?" with lyrics by Ring Lardner
- "What's a Kiss Among Friends?" with lyrics by Clifford Grey and Leo Robin
- "When I'm With the Girls" with lyrics by Ira Gershwin
- "When We Are Married" with lyrics by Zelda Sears and Walter De Leon
- "Where Has My Hubby Gone?" with lyrics by Otto Harbach and Irving Caesar
- "Who Wants to Love Spanish Ladies?" with lyrics by Oscar Hammerstein II
- "Who's Who With You" with lyrics by Ira Gershwin
- "Why Ain't I Home" with lyrics by Ring Lardner
- "Why Oh Why" with lyrics by Clifford Grey and Leo Robin
- "Wildflower" with help from Herbert Stothart and lyrics by Otto Harbach and Oscar Hammerstein II
- "Without a Song" with lyrics by Billy Rose and Edward Eliscu
- "You Can Dance with Any Girl" with lyrics by Otto Harbach and Irving Caesar
- "You Started Something When You Came Along" with lyrics by Ira Gershwin
- "You're Everywhere" with lyrics by Edward Heyman
- "You're The One" with lyrics by J. Russel Robinson and George Waggner
