= Graham Dalby =

British swing jazz bandleader, conductor and author. (1957–Present)

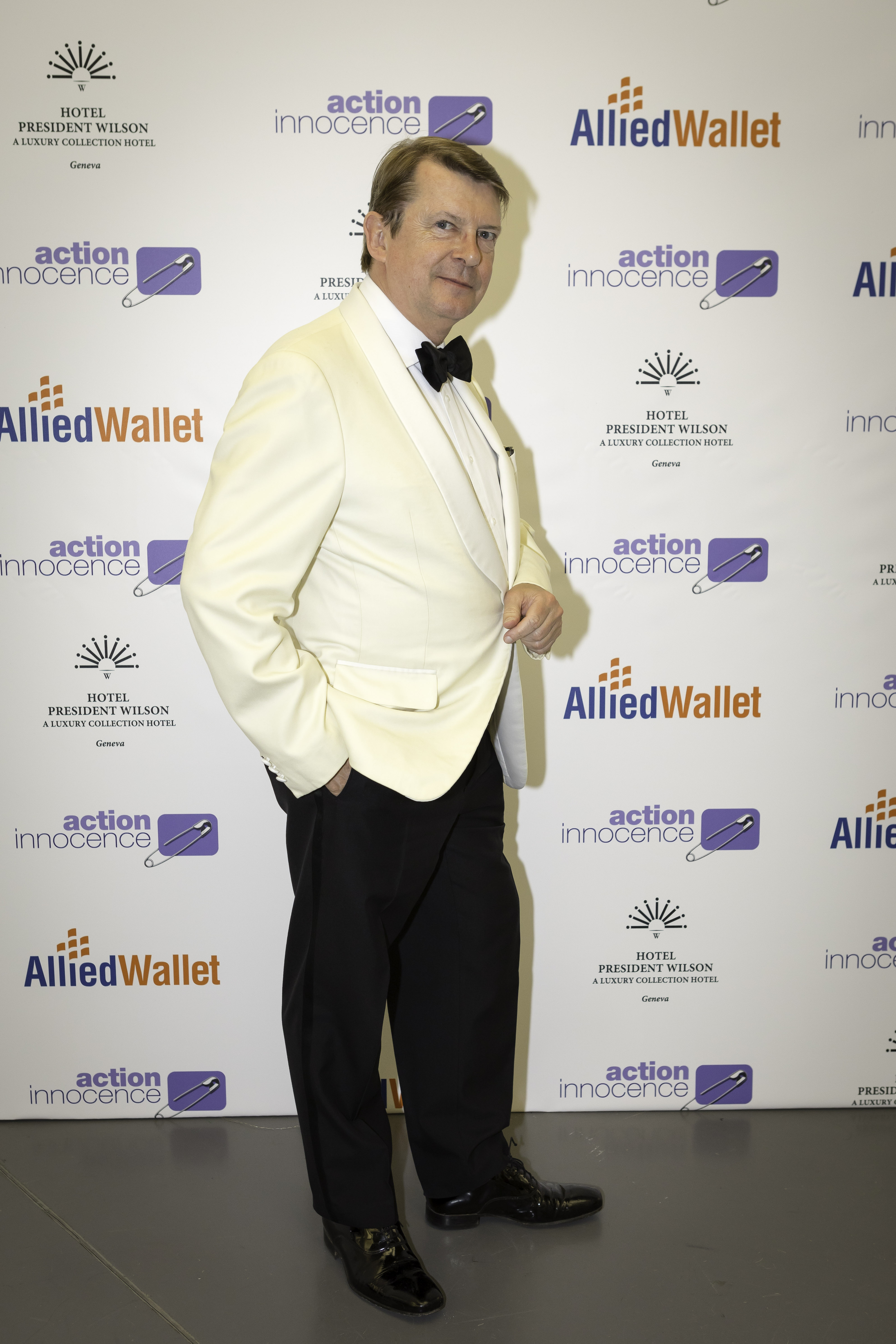
- Born: Graham James Dalby; December 2, 1957; Chatham Medway, United Kingdom
- Education: Trinity College of Music London
- Occupations: Bandleader; Vocalist; Conductor
- Years active: 1987–Present
- Musical career
- Genre: Jazz
- Label: Music for Pleasure

Graham James Dalby (born 2 December 1957 in Chatham, Medway, UK) is a British composer, conductor, band leader, vocalist, specializing in Jazz music from 1911 to 1965. He was a member of the Hong Kong police force until 1979. In 1985 Dalby founded the London Swing Orchestra, initially to perform for a VE event until it later became professional and went on to play a number of royal events. In 1987, he created a Jazz band named Graham Dalby and the Grahamaphones; they performed all over the world (except the United States of America).

Dalby wrote the theme song and appeared on the BBC Two video documentary I'd Sooner Be A Crooner, a BBC2 programme which profiled him and his band and their bid to "keep alive" 1930s big band music. He also arranged, and performed with his band, the song "You're The Cream In My Coffee" for the intro of the BBC TV show, The Mrs Bradley Mysteries.

In 2015 Dalby and the London Swing Orchestra celebrated 5 centuries of dance music on BBC Radio 2, along with the BBC Concert Orchestra. In 2017 Dalby started the Choir of the Western Wynde, a group of singers that had come together via Trinity alumni. As of 2018 Dalby is the director of the Trowbridge Philharmonic Choir.

== Discography ==
- We're Tops On Saturday Night, Graham Dalby and The Grahamophones (1987)
- Mad Dogs and Englishmen, Graham Dalby The Grahamophones (1988)
- Let's Dance Latin American, Graham Dalby The Grahamophones (1995)
- Let's Dance the Slow Foxtrot, Graham Dalby The Grahamophones (1995)
- Let's Dance The Jive, Graham Dalby and The Grahamophones (1996)
- Let's Dance Latin American Volume 5, Graham Dalby and The Grahamophones (1997)
- Jazz And Swing On Screen, Graham Dalby and the London Swing Orchestra (2022)

== Bibliography ==
- Dalby, Graham (2002). Can't Hear Yourself Think - Autobiography of a Serial Name-Dropper. Austin Macauley. p. 208. ISBN 9781398460171.
- Dalby, Graham (2025). Huscarl!. Graham Dalby. ISBN 9781958680445.
- Dalby, Graham (2025). Outlaw!. Graham Dalby. ISBN 9781958680483.
