= I've Got Five Dollars =

Song
- Published: 1931
- Composer: Richard Rodgers
- Lyricist: Lorenz Hart

"I've Got Five Dollars" is a 1931 popular song composed by Richard Rodgers, with lyrics by Lorenz Hart for the musical America's Sweetheart (1931) where it was introduced by Harriette Lake (a.k.a. Ann Sothern) and Jack Whiting.

Popular recordings in 1931 were by Ben Pollack (recorded March 2, 1931 for Perfect Records, No. 15431) and by Emil Coleman & his Orchestra (recorded January 23, 1931, Brunswick 6036) with Smith Ballew, vocal refrain.

Note that this is a different song than the country and western song titled "I've Got Five Dollars and It's Saturday Night" written by Ted Daffan.

== Other notable recordings ==
- Lee Morse & Her Bluegrass Boys (recorded February 20, 1931, Columbia 2417-D) (1931)
- Lee Wiley - on Gala 78 (1940)
- Bing Crosby — Bing Sings Whilst Bregman Swings (1956)
- Ella Fitzgerald - Ella Fitzgerald Sings the Rodgers & Hart Songbook (1956)
- Jeri Southern - included in her album Jeri Gently Jumps (1957)
- Anita O'Day – Anita O'Day and Billy May Swing Rodgers and Hart (1960)

== Film appearances ==
- 1932 The Big Broadcast - snatch only - sung by Bing Crosby
- 1955 Gentlemen Marry Brunettes - sung by Jane Russell and Scott Brady (dubbed by Robert Farnon).
