= Al Goodman =

Al Goodman Ал Гудман
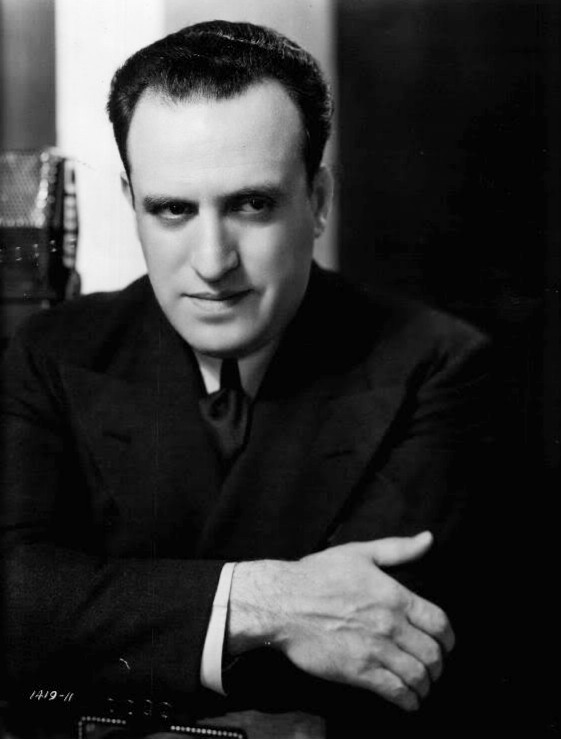
- Goodman in 1938

Background information
- Also known as: Alfred Goodman
- Born: August 12, 1890; Nikopol, Russian Empire (present-day Nikopol, Ukraine)
- Died: January 10, 1972 (aged 81) New York City, USA
- Genres: Musical
- Occupation: musical director
- Years active: 1907–1960s
- Labels: RCA Victor; Columbia

Alfred Goodman (August 12, 1890 – January 10, 1972) was a conductor, songwriter, stage composer, musical director, arranger, and pianist.

== Early years ==
Goodman was born in Nikopol, Ukraine, (another source says that he was born in Odessa, Ukraine). His father, Tobias Goodman, was a cantor in a synagogue in Odessa. Goodman sang in a choir when he was 5 years old and had become fluent in reading music by age 6. When he was about 7, the family left Russia to escape a pogrom. Disguised as farmers, they made their way to Romania. There they lost their money but escaped to the United States and settled in Baltimore. Goodman graduated from Baltimore City College and the Peabody Conservatory in Baltimore. He earned money by playing piano for films at the Pickwick Theatre in Baltimore.

== Career ==
Goodman worked as a musician in a nickelodeon and chorus boy in one of the Milton Aborn's operettas. Before he was 20, Goodman began working in Chicago as orchestrator for M. Witmark & Sons, a music publishing company. He moved to Los Angeles, where he began conducting in addition to composing and arranging. There, he met Al Jolson, which led to his going to New York to become Jolson's conductor.

Goodman was first introduced to musical comedy by the late Earl Carroll, who persuaded him to collaborate in producing his musical, So Long Letty. The success, followed by the hit "Sinbad," which he produced with Al Jolson, led to positions as orchestra conductor for many Broadway productions including the highly successful Flyin' High, The Student Prince, and Blossom Time. In all, during this period of his career, Goodman directed over 150 first-night performances and became one of the Great White Way's most popular conductors. He debuted as a musical director on Broadway with Canary Cottage (1917), and his final Broadway production was Hold on to Your Hats (1940).

He was in such demand that it was not uncommon for him to conduct the orchestra of a show for the first few performances, and then hand the baton over to another while he prepared for a new production. In addition to his many assignments as one of RCA Victor's most talented conductors and arrangers, Goodman was kept busy directing the music for radio network shows.

Programs on which he worked included Al Goodman's Musical Album (1951–1953), The Bob Hope Show, The Family Hour, The Fred Allen Show (1945–1949), The Gulf Show, Hit the Jackpot, The Intimate Revue, The James Melton Show, Palmolive Beauty Box Theater (1935–1937), The Prudential Family Hour, Showboat, Texaco Star Theater, Your Hit Parade (1935–1938), and The Ziegfeld Follies of the Air (1932),

On television, Goodman worked on Colgate Comedy Hour, The Donald O'Connor Show, Fireball Fun for All, and Sound Off Time.

Goodman wrote some memorable songs such as "When Hearts Are Young", "Call of Love" and "Twilight". He also worked on several musicals such as The Band Wagon, Good News and Ziegfeld Follies.

== Personal life and death ==
Goodman was married to Fannie Sneidman. He died in New York City.
