= Hold On to Your Hats =

1940 musical comedy

Hold On To Your Hats
- Sheet Music
- Music: Burton Lane
- Lyrics: E. Y. Harburg

Hold On To Your Hats is a musical comedy in two acts by Guy Bolton, Matt Brooks, and Eddie Davis, with lyrics by E. Y. Harburg and music by Burton Lane. The show was lavishly staged by Edgar MacGregor, with dances by Catherine Littlefield, musical direction by Al Goodman, and colorful settings and costumes by Raoul Pene Du Bois. It was produced by Al Jolson and George Hale at the Shubert Theatre on September 11, 1940. It ran for 158 performances, closing on February 1, 1941. The cast included Jolson, Martha Raye, Jinx Falkenburg, Arnold Moss, Jack Whiting, Russ Brown, and John Randolph. It was the last show in which Jolson appeared.

== Plot ==
With scenes in Route 66, Sunshine Valley Rancho, New York City, and Mexico, a posse of cowboys comes in from the West looking for The Lone Rider (Al Jolson) of the radio drama, to go west and round up the notorious bandit Fernando (Arnold Moss). He finally sings his way out of trouble after several narrow escapes.

== Songs ==
Act 1

- "Way Out West Where the East Begins"
- "Hold On To Your Hats"
- "Walkin’ Along Mindin’ My Business"
- "The World Is In My Arms"
- "Would You Be So Kindly"
- "Life Was Pie for the Pioneer"
- "Don't Let It Get You Down"
- "There's a Great Day Coming, Mañana"

Act 2

- "Then You Were Never in Love"
- "Down on the Dude Ranch"
- "She Came, She Saw, She Can-Canned"
- "Old-Timer"

Five songs from other shows.
