= Nixon Theatre =

Former movie theater in Philadelphia, PA, US

Coordinates: 39.95905°N 75.22515°W

The Nixon Theatre was a theatre in Philadelphia. It was built in 1910 and closed around 1984. It held 1,870 seats. The architectural design of the Nixon Theatre was made by John D. Allen. It was located on 34 S 52nd Street, Philadelphia, PA. The theater was brick and stone with a two-story arched entrance and a bow window at the top. Now, the site is Payless ShoeSource and Rainbow Kids. Jimmy Bishop, a popular old local Philly radio DJ helped run Arctic Records and organize various performances in this theatre.
