= Good News (musical) =

Musical by Laurence Schwab, Buddy DeSylva, Lew Brown and Ray Henderson

- Original 1927 Broadway Program
- Music: Ray Henderson
- Lyrics: B.G. DeSylva; Lew Brown
- Book: Laurence Schwab; B.G. DeSylva
- Productions: 1927 Broadway; 1930 Film; 1947 Film; 1974 Broadway revival 1993 Wichita

Good News is a musical comedy in two acts with a book by Laurence Schwab and B.G. DeSylva, lyrics by DeSylva and Lew Brown, and music by Ray Henderson. The story is set in the Roaring Twenties at Tait College, where football star Tom Marlowe falls in love with studious Connie Lane, who is tutoring him so he can pass astronomy and be eligible to play in the big game.

The show opened on Broadway in 1927, the same year as Show Boat, but though its plot was decidedly old-fashioned in comparison to Show Boat and its daring storyline, it was also a hit. Good News spawned two films (one in 1930 starring Bessie Love and one in 1947 starring June Allyson), an unsuccessful 1974 Broadway revival, and a 1993 updated production by Music Theatre of Wichita which created a largely new libretto and made changes to the score. It proved to be DeSylva, Brown, and Henderson's biggest hit out of a string of topical musicals.

== Synopsis ==
=== Original 1927 version ===
Act I

World War I is over, the Roaring Twenties have arrived, and college campuses, such as fictional Tait College, are as much a social scene as an academic one ("Opening Chorus"). Football star Tom Marlowe neglects his studies and fails his astronomy class, which he had to pass to play in the big game. Charles Kenyon, his astronomy professor, gives Tom one more chance to pass the exam.

Babe O'Day, a vivacious flapper, announces that she has broken up with Beef Saunders, a brawny and possessive football player. Babe wants a new boyfriend who does not care about old-fashioned rules of propriety ("Flaming Youth"). Tom asks his girlfriend Patricia to help him study for the test, but she is busy with sorority plans, so she recommends that he work with her studious cousin, Connie Lane. The boys marvel that Tom is remaining cheerful despite his circumstances, and Tom explains that college is the time for "Happy Days". Connie has a crush on Tom, but she says that she will "Just Imagine" that he is in love with her. Babe informs Bobby Randall, substitute player on the football team and Tom's roommate, that he is now her boyfriend. Connie and Tom meet to study and are initially uncomfortable working together, but soon they find they have a lot in common and similar philosophies of life ("The Best Things In Life Are Free").

Friday morning Tom and Bobby wake up in their dormitory, and Tom leaves to meet Connie to study. A door-slamming farce follows during which Babe, Beef, Kearney (the football team's trainer), and Sylvester (a freshman who idolizes Tom) all end up in Tom and Bobby's dorm room, and Bobby must keep the men from finding out that Babe is there.

Couples walk together "On the Campus". Flo, an outspoken energetic girl, leads the students in dancing the "Varsity Drag". Bobby tries to tell Babe he loves her but says he is too nervous to say it ("Baby! What?").

Tom takes his exam, but he later admits to Connie that during the test, he could not focus on astronomy; he was thinking about her. Tom declares that with Connie he is "Lucky in Love". Professor Kenyon grades Tom's test and knows that Tom deserves a failing grade, but because Kenyon is an alumnus of Tait and a loyal football fan, he keeps that secret and instead gives Tom the lowest passing grade so he can play in the big game. At the pep rally that evening the students sing the "Tait Song" as the school band plays. Bobby announces that if Tom wins the game tomorrow, Patricia has promised to marry him. During a chorus of "Lucky in Love" Connie faints and falls into Tom's arms ("Finaletto").

Act II

On Saturday Patricia's sorority, Pi Beta Phi, is hosting a luncheon ("The Girl of the Pi Beta Phi"). The girls are excited about the football game ("Today's the Day"). Babe asks Bobby, who has been flirting with other girls, why he will not commit to her, and Bobby, who has sat on the bench all season and does not expect to play in the big game at all, tells her if he wins the game, he will marry her ("In the Meantime"). Connie confronts Tom and tears up her ticket to the game because she does not want to watch him win for Patricia, and Tom tells her he would rather lose the game. Flo says that she knows Tait is going to win and "Good News" must be on its way.

Outside the entrance to the football field Connie meets Professor Kenyon, who is on his way to the game. Professor Kenyon tells her the truth: Tom did not deserve to pass the test, but to help the football team, he gave Tom the passing grade. Babe explains to Connie that Tom did not betray her—a long time ago, after a wild party involving homemade gin, Tom wrote a letter proposing to Patricia, and Patricia has kept the letter and is holding him to it.

At the end of the first half of the game the score is 3–0 against Tait. Coach Johnson decides to let Bobby play in the second half. When the second half is almost over, Tom gets the ball and runs for a touchdown, but he is tackled by the opposing team. He fumbles the ball, and it flies in the air and improbably lands in Bobby's arms, and Bobby scores the winning touchdown. The students leave the game celebrating the victory ("Good News" (reprise)). Tom tells Connie, who watched the game through a knothole in the fence surrounding the stadium, that he fumbled because he knew he could not win the game for Patricia. He worries that his chances of being named for the All-American team are gone, but Connie helps him remember that "The Best Things in Life Are Free" (reprise). He asks Connie if she would marry him if he did not have to marry Patricia, and she says she would.

That evening, a dance is held at the boathouse ("Varsity Drag" (reprise)). Babe tells Bobby that since neither of them expected for him to win the game, he does not have to marry her. Bobby says he wants to marry Babe; everyone else thinks he is a football hero, but she knows who he really is. Patricia, not wanting to marry a man who is not really in love with her, tells Tom that he can marry Connie instead. The news spreads that Tom has been named to the All-American team. Tom and Connie meet Professor Kenyon, whom Tom resents for failing him the first time. Connie explains to Tom that Professor Kenyon passed him even though he did not deserve it. Tom realizes he has misjudged Kenyon and shakes his hand. After a final chorus of "Good News", Tom and Connie embrace.

=== Revised 1993 version ===
Act I

Tait College is still caught up in the social scene of the Roaring Twenties, and star football player Tom Marlowe is expected to lead the football team to victory ("Good News"). All the sorority girls are crazy about Tom ("He's a Ladies' Man"), but he is off limits since he is currently romancing Patricia Bingham, whose father is of one of the college's wealthiest benefactors. The football team, under the guidance of superstitious team trainer Pooch Kearney, is on the practice field getting ready for Saturday's Big Game against archrival Colton College ("The Football Drill"). Meanwhile Bobby Randall, a substitute on the football team, is pleasantly shocked when Babe O'Day, a stylish flapper, pursues him. Babe has broken up with her old boyfriend, the hulking Beef Saunders, and is looking for a new man ("Button Up Your Overcoat").

Sylvester (a college freshman whom no one knows the last name of) found out that Tom has neglected his studies and has failed his astronomy final, which he needed to pass in order to play in the Big Game. Astronomy professor Charlotte Kenyon agrees to give Tom one more chance with a make-up exam. Privately Professor Kenyon tells Connie Lane, a studious co-ed, about her lost college romance with a football player (who is now the Tait football coach), and Connie wishes she could fall in love ("Together/My Lucky Star"). Football Coach Johnson, meanwhile, tells his confidant Pooch that he and Professor Kenyon dated and broke up in college ("Together"). They ask Patricia if she would tutor Tom for his exam, but she has to choose new drapes for the sorority house that night and recommends her cousin Connie instead. As couples stroll romantically "On the Campus", Connie and Tom meet at the library to study. After an awkward beginning, Tom and Connie soon realize they have a lot in common with similar philosophies of life ("The Best Things In Life Are Free"). Across campus Coach Johnson nostalgically serenades Professor Kenyon with the hope that she will go easy when Tom retakes his exam. Initially charmed, she responds warmly ("You're The Cream in my Coffee") but soon realizes his attempt to manipulate her and angrily sends him away.

The next morning, Tom takes his make-up exam as the students nervously await the results in the Malt Shoppe. Babe insists that they cannot let school depress them and teaches everyone the latest dance, "The Varsity Drag". Sylvester bursts into the Malt Shoppe shouting that Tom has passed the test, and Tom finds Connie to tell her that he could not have done it without her help, declaring that she has made him "Lucky In Love". Babe tells Bobby she is in love with him, and even though Bobby's scared of Beef (who still considers Babe his girl), he agrees that they might be "Lucky In Love", too. Patricia interrupts everyone to say that her wealthy father has announced he will double his donation to the athletic department if Tom wins the Big Game for Tait and marries Pat. Connie is shocked, and Tom is dumbstruck as the students joyously sing another chorus of "Lucky in Love".

Act II

It is Saturday, and "Today's the Day" of the big game against Colton. Pat and the sorority girls are terribly excited but are briefly saddened when they realize this is the last football game they will ever attend as students ("The Girl of the Pi Beta Phi")! Bobby stops by the sorority open house (after all, they might have sandwiches) and commits to Babe ("Never Swat a Fly") but only if they win the game. The students head to the Big Game singing "The Tait Song" as Pat tries to pressure Tom into marrying her. Tom feels that Tait's whole athletic program is at stake and reluctantly tells Connie he cannot stay with her. Connie resigns herself to "Just Imagine" Tom is still there with her.

The game begins, but Tom is so upset about Connie that by halftime Tait is far behind Colton. Pooch urges the team to "Keep Your Sunny Side Up", while Professor Kenyon tries to persuade Babe and Connie that the three of them should devise a strategy to pursue their men and help them win the game. Through their combined efforts Bobby scores an unexpected touchdown, and Tait wins the big game. Sylvester, who is William Randolph Hearst's nephew, tells the paper that Tom planned the game, and the happy couples, Tom and Connie, Bobby and Babe, and Coach Johnson and Professor Kenyon, all end up together ("Finale").

== Song list ==
=== Original 1927 production ===
Act I

- Opening Chorus (includes Good News and He's a Ladies' Man) - Company
- Flaming Youth - Babe O'Day, Millie, Flo, Slats, Windy
- Happy Days - Tom Marlowe, Jim, Ben, Pete
- Just Imagine - Connie Lane, Patricia Bingham, Millie
- The Best Things in Life Are Free - Tom and Connie
- On the Campus - Flo, Millie, Windy, Sylvester
- The Varsity Drag - Flo, Millie, Windy, Sylvester
- Baby! What? - Babe, Bobby Randall
- Lucky in Love - Connie, Tom
- Tait Song - Kearney, Johnson, George, Company
- Finaletto - Company

Act II

- Girl of the Pi Beta Phi - Patricia, Girls
- Today's the Day - Girls
- In the Meantime - Bobby, Babe
- Good News - Flo, Boys, Girls
- Tait Song (reprise) - College Band (instrumental)
- Good News (reprise) - Girls, Jim, Ben, Pete, Flo
- The Best Things in Life are Free - Connie, Tom
- Varsity Drag (reprise) - Company
- Good News (reprise) - Company

=== Revised 1993 production ===
Act I

- Opening Chorus (includes Good News) - Students
- He's A Ladies' Man - Millie, Flo, Girls
- The Football Drill - Instrumental
- Button Up Your Overcoat - Babe O'Day, Bobby Randall
- Sour Apples - Students
- Together/My Lucky Star - Professor Kenyon, Connie Lane, Coach Johnson
- On The Campus - Students
- The Best Things In Life Are Free - Connie, Tom Marlowe
- You're the Cream in My Coffee - Coach Johnson, Professor Kenyon
- The Varsity Drag - Babe, Students
- Lucky In Love - Tom, Connie, Patricia Bingham, Babe, Bobby, Students

Act II

- Today's The Day - Sorority Girls
- The Girl Of The Pi Beta Phi - Patricia, Sorority Girls
- Never Swat a Fly - Bobby, Babe
- Tait Song - Students
- Just Imagine - Connie
- Keep Your Sunny Side Up - Pooch, Football Team
- Life Is Just a Bowl of Cherries - Professor Kenyon, Babe, Connie
- The Best Things in Life are Free (reprise) - Connie, Tom
- The Varsity Drag (reprise) - Company

== Productions ==
=== 1927 Broadway ===
The original Broadway production, directed by Edgar MacGregor and choreographed by Bobby Connolly, opened on September 6, 1927, at The 46th Street Theatre, where it ran for 557 performances, which was a very successful run, as few Broadway shows had reached 500 performances since 1919's Irene. The cast included John Price Jones as Tom Marlowe, Mary Lawlor as Connie Lane, Gus Shy as Bobby Randall, Inez Courtney as Babe O'Day, and Zelma O'Neal as Flo. Donald Oenslager designed the production's sets. To emphasize the collegiate atmosphere, ushers wore jerseys, and George Olsen's band (featured as the "College Band") reached the orchestra pit by running down the aisles as they shouted college cheers. University of Notre Dame football coach Knute Rockne received credit for "Advice in Football Technique". The musical was set in what was then the present day, the Roaring Twenties, and, according to musical theatre historian Gerald Bordman, it was clearly a reflection of that era: "The decade's jazzy sounds, its assertive, explosive beat, its sophomoric high jinks were joyously mirrored..." The plot hinged on a professor's unexpected generosity: Tom fails Professor Charles Kenyon's astronomy class, and, even though Connie tutors him, he still fails his makeup exam. Professor Kenyon gives him a passing grade, though, because he, unbeknownst to the students, is actually a football fan.

=== 1974 Revival ===
In the 1970s, producer Harry Rigby started the Broadway nostalgia craze with his revivals of No, No, Nanette and Irene. He decided that Good News would be his next project. Rigby planned to feature former movie musical stars in Good News, as he had in No, No, Nanette and Irene. John Payne was cast as the football coach, and Alice Faye was cast as the (now female) astronomy professor, who was renamed Professor Charlotte Kenyon. The book was rewritten to create a romance between their characters, reducing the impact of the college student characters who had made the 1927 version popular. Because Rigby had already produced No, No, Nanette, a revival set in the 1920s, he moved the setting of Good News to the Depression-era Thirties. During the development of the revival, the score was also altered; some songs from the original 1927 production were removed, while six songs from other Ray Henderson scores were interpolated. Abe Burrows was hired as director and adapter, and Donald Saddler was hired as choreographer; however, during the development of the revival, they were replaced by Michael Kidd as director/choreographer and Garry Marshall as adapter. A few weeks before the Broadway opening, John Payne, whose contract had run out, was replaced by Gene Nelson. After a try-out in Boston, a nationwide tour for almost a year, and 51 previews, a lavish production opened on Broadway on December 23, 1974, at the St. James Theatre where, having failed to charm the critics as its predecessor had, it ran for only 16 regular performances. Saddler was nominated for the Drama Desk Award for Outstanding Choreography.

=== 1993 Production ===
In 1993, Mark Madama and Wayne Bryan (who had played the role of Bobby Randall in the 1974 production) revised the book and score for Music Theatre of Wichita. They retained some of the plot elements and score additions from the 1974 production, including the romance between the (female) astronomy professor and football coach, but they returned the story to the 1920s, added back more of the 1927 score, and recentered the book so its main focus was the college students. They also altered the story so Tom, because of Connie's tutoring, passes the test on his own accord without any undeserved help from Professor Kenyon. The production starred Michael Gruber, Kim Huber, Ann Morrison and Scott Schafer. This version has now been licensed for over 400 professional and amateur productions in the United States, Canada, and England. A studio cast recording of this adaptation was released in 1995, performed by many members of the 1993 cast, but with Wayne Bryan returning to the role of Bobby.

== Film adaptations ==
MGM released two film versions, the first in 1930 with Bessie Love and Cliff Edwards and the second in 1947 with June Allyson and Peter Lawford. The Railroad Hour broadcast a 45-minute condensed version as its first episode on October 4, 1948.

== Reception ==
The original 1927 Broadway production met with positive reviews. Brooks Atkinson of The New York Times pronounced it "a ripping good show", with an authentically collegiate atmosphere, stating, "For once a musical play based upon undergraduate life and a football game has some resemblance to the disorderly, rhymeless scheme of things in American institutions of learning". He deemed it "a constantly fast entertainment with furious dancing, catchy tunes...excellent singing, and genuine excitement."

The 1974 production opened to mostly negative reviews. Some critics had begun to consider Rigby's revivals formulaic; Clive Barnes of The New York Times derisively pronounced Good News, and shows like it, "prefabricated...nostalgia", and Martin Gottfried of the New York Post deemed it "a joyless, mechanical reproduction". The book was harshly criticized; Barnes pronounced it "a terrible book" with "jokes obvious enough to give banana skins a bad name", and Time referred to it as an "ancient flapdoodle of a plot". Critics also questioned the practice of interpolating songs from other shows. Walter Kerr opined that preserving the original score was vital to the character of a revival, stating, "the only reason for remounting vehicles that have half-vanished...is to get beyond all that is dated into the specific textures of the scores that haven't...there's no point for enduring banality in a book if all you're going to get in return is a random rummage through an attic that produces a perhaps bountiful but essentially characterless heap".

Critics differed on what they considered the show's good points to be. In the Daily News, Douglas Watt declared, "the dancing is the best part of the show" but deemed the vocal arrangements "too-busy". Gottfried, however, said the show was "stolen by the vocal arranger", whom he credited with "dazzling harmonizations and stylings". He disliked the staging, saying it was suitable "for a concert rather than theater and [allowed] little acting". Barnes, however, pronounced the staging "very good", saying, "It has a sense of style, a sense of period and a few bursts of energy that really work". Barnes praised the sets and costumes, while Watt asserted that the costumes seemed to vacillate between the '20s and '30s and that the sets were "uninteresting and cheap-looking".

Alice Faye and Gene Nelson's performances received mixed reviews. Watt said that Faye "doesn't add much to the show," and Gottfried asserted that "combined,[Faye and Nelson] have the stage presence of a balcony seat". Time said that "[Faye and Nelson] only succeed in underlining the show's decrepitude." Barnes, however, stated that though Faye "is not the most animated leading lady...her light baritone voice is pleasing, and she unquestionably dances with the guts of a Ruby Keeler. Gene Nelson...has enormous personal charm and stage professionalism." Kerr said that Faye "sounds winsome and welcome...she is a composed performer and a willing workhorse". The actors portraying the young college students were generally well received. In his review, Barnes praised Jana Robbins, Barbara Lail, Marti Rolph, Scott Stevenson, and Wayne Bryan for their performances as the principal student characters. In Newsweek, Jack Kroll declared, "One's heart goes out to the young people in a show like this, like Barbara Lail and Marti Rolph, whose drive and energy really must carry [the show]". Marti Rolph, in the role of Connie Lane, received particular praise from critics. Watt declared, "The only really good singing voice among the principals belongs to Marti Rolph". Gottfried wrote, "The only standout, really, is Marti Rolph--the ingenue--who has a gorgeous voice and manages to inject pert spirit into a spiritless show".

The 1993 Musical Theatre of Wichita production was well received by local critics. In The Wichita Eagle, Susan L. Rife wrote that the new production was a "lavish ode to the outright goofiness of the Roaring '20s", praising the actors' exuberance and the choreography. She suggested that the show's three-hour run time was too long, and noted that "its pace swings wildly from high-energy dance numbers to slow-moving chunks of dialogue".
