= Buddy DeSylva =

American songwriter, film producer and record executive (1895–1950)

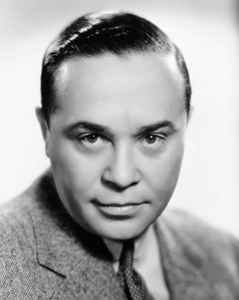
- DeSylva in 1928

Background information
- Also known as: Buddy De Sylva, Buddy DeSylva, Bud De Sylva, Buddy G. DeSylva, B.G. DeSylva
- Born: George Gard DeSylva; January 27, 1895; New York City, U.S.
- Died: July 11, 1950 (aged 55) Los Angeles, California, U.S.
- Occupations: Songwriter, film producer, record executive
- Years active: 1918–1947
- Formerly of: Lew Brown, Ray Henderson

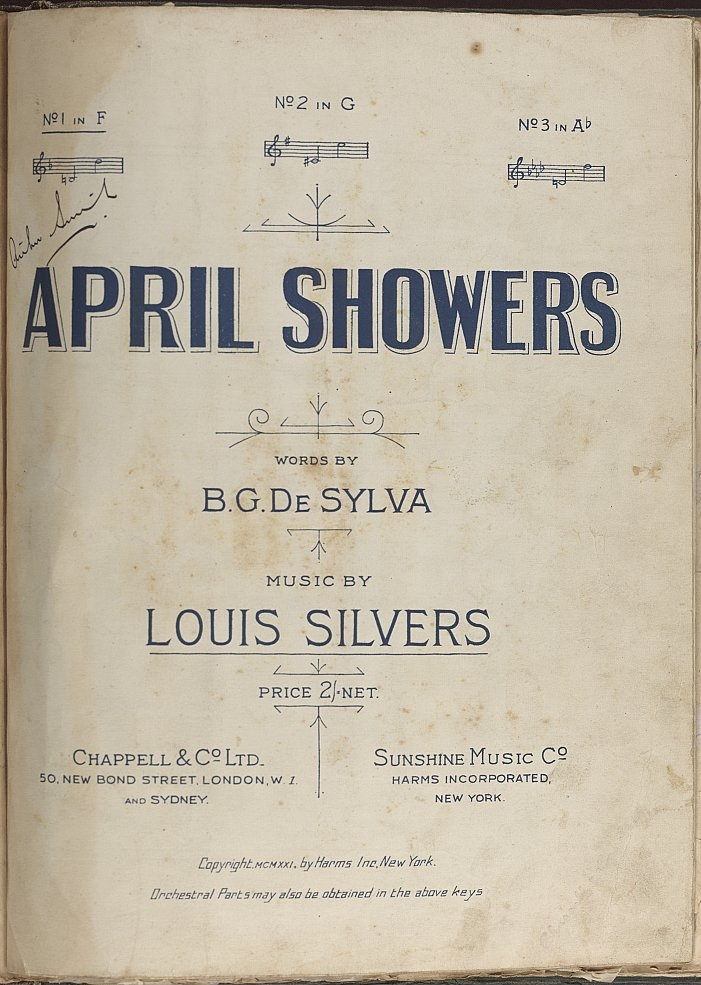
Song written by Buddy DeSylva

George Gard "Buddy" DeSylva (January 27, 1895 – July 11, 1950) was an American songwriter, film producer, and record executive. He wrote or co-wrote many popular songs, and he co-founded Capitol Records along with Johnny Mercer and Glenn Wallichs.

== Biography ==
Though DeSylva was born in New York City, he grew up in California and attended the University of Southern California, where he joined the Theta Xi fraternity.

His father, Aloysius J. De Sylva, was better known to American audiences as actor Hal De Forrest. Aloysius was of multiracial ancestry with his father being born in the West Indies and his mother born in either England or Scotland. Aloysius's father was Dr. James M. Fenwick, a black physician who emigrated to the United States in 1865. In 1889 Aloysius legally changed his surname from Fenwick to De Sylva to pass for white—more specifically, for someone from Portugal.

Buddy's father was a lawyer as well as an actor. His mother, Georgetta Miles Gard, was the daughter of Los Angeles police chief George E. Gard.

DeSylva's first successful songs were those used by Al Jolson on Broadway in the 1918 production of Sinbad, which included "I'll Say She Does". Soon thereafter, he met Jolson and in 1918 the pair went to New York, where DeSylva began working as a songwriter in Tin Pan Alley.

In the early 1920s DeSylva frequently worked with composer George Gershwin. Together they created the experimental one-act jazz opera set in Harlem, Blue Monday, which is widely regarded as a forerunner to Porgy and Bess ten years later.

In April 1924 DeSylva married Marie Wallace, a Ziegfeld Follies dancer.

In 1925 DeSylva became one third of the songwriting team with lyricist Lew Brown and composer Ray Henderson, who was one of the top Tin Pan Alley songwriters of the era. The team was responsible for the song "Magnolia" (1927) which was popularized by Lou Gold's orchestra. The writing and publishing partnership continued until 1930, producing a string of hits and the perennial Broadway favorite Good News.

DeSylva joined ASCAP in 1920 and served on the ASCAP board of directors between 1922 and 1930. He became a producer of stage and screen musicals. DeSylva relocated to Hollywood and was contracted to Fox Studios.

During this tenure he produced movies such as The Little Colonel, The Littlest Rebel, Captain January, Poor Little Rich Girl, and Stowaway. In 1941 he became the Executive Producer at Paramount Pictures, a position he would hold until 1944. He was also an uncredited executive producer for Double Indemnity, For Whom the Bell Tolls, The Story of Dr. Wassell, and The Glass Key. Betty Hutton always credited DeSylva for bringing her to Hollywood and launching her film career.

The Paramount all-star extravaganza Star Spangled Rhythm, which takes place at the Paramount film studio in Hollywood, features a fictional movie executive named "B.G. DeSoto" (played by Walter Abel) who is a parody of DeSylva.

In 1942 Johnny Mercer, Glenn Wallichs, and DeSylva founded Capitol Records. He also founded the Cowboy label.

He is sometimes credited as Buddy De Sylva, Buddy DeSylva, Bud De Sylva, Buddy G. DeSylva, and B.G. DeSylva.

Buddy DeSylva died of a heart ailment in Hollywood, aged 55, and is buried at Glendale's Forest Lawn Memorial Park Cemetery.

== Individual songs ==
- Desylva, Buddy, B. G. De Sylva, Lew Brown, and Ray Henderson. Seven Veils. 26 March 1927
- Desylva, Buddy, B. G. De Sylva, Lew Brown, and Ray Henderson. Good News: vocal selection. [Place of publication not identified]: Chappell, n.d. OCLC 495863850
- Henderson, Ray, B. G. De Sylva, and Bud Green. "Alabamy Bound". New York: Shapiro, Bernstein & Co, 1925. OCLC 645628000
- De Sylva, B. G., Lew Brown, and Ray Henderson. "Magnolia". 1927. OCLC 918927178
- "Avalon"
- "April Showers"
- "The Best Things in Life Are Free"
- "The Birth of the Blues"
- "Button Up Your Overcoat"
- "California, Here I Come"
- "If You Knew Susie"
- "It All Depends on You"
- "Look for the Silver Lining"
- "Somebody Loves Me"
- "Sonny Boy"
- "The Varsity Drag"
- "You're the Cream in My Coffee"

== Broadway credits ==
- 1919 – La La Lucille (music by George Gershwin)
- 1922 – George White's Scandals of 1922 (music by George Gershwin, and included premiere of one-act jazz opera Blue Monday)
- 1922 – Orange Blossoms (music by Victor Herbert)
- 1922 – The Yankee Princess (music by Emmerich Kalman)
- 1923 – George White's Scandals of 1923 (music by George Gershwin)
- 1924 – Sweet Little Devil (music by George Gershwin)
- 1924 – George White's Scandals of 1924 (music by George Gershwin)
- 1925 – Big Boy (music by Joseph Meyer and James F. Hanley)
- 1925 – Tell Me More! (co-lyricist with Ira Gershwin, music by George Gershwin)
- 1925 – George White's Scandals of 1925 (DeSylva, Brown, and Henderson)
- 1925 – Captain Jinks (music by Lewis Gensler)
- 1926 – George White's Scandals of 1926 (DeSylva, Brown, and Henderson)
- 1926 – Queen High (music by Lewis Gensler)
- 1927 – Good News (DeSylva, Brown, and Henderson)
- 1927 – Manhattan Mary (DeSylva, Brown, and Henderson)
- 1928 – George White's Scandals of 1928 (DeSylva, Brown, and Henderson)
- 1928 – Hold Everything! (DeSylva, Brown, and Henderson)
- 1929 – Follow Thru (DeSylva, Brown, and Henderson)
- 1930 – Flying High (DeSylva, Brown, and Henderson)
- 1932 – Take a Chance (music by Nacio Herb Brown, Richard A. Whiting, and Vincent Youmans)

== Selected filmography ==
- Stepping Sisters (1932)
- My Weakness (1933)
- The Stork Club (1945)

== In popular culture ==
The 1956 Hollywood film The Best Things in Life Are Free, starring Gordon MacRae, Dan Dailey, and Ernest Borgnine, depicted the De Sylva, Brown, and Henderson trio and collaboration.
