= 1928 in music =

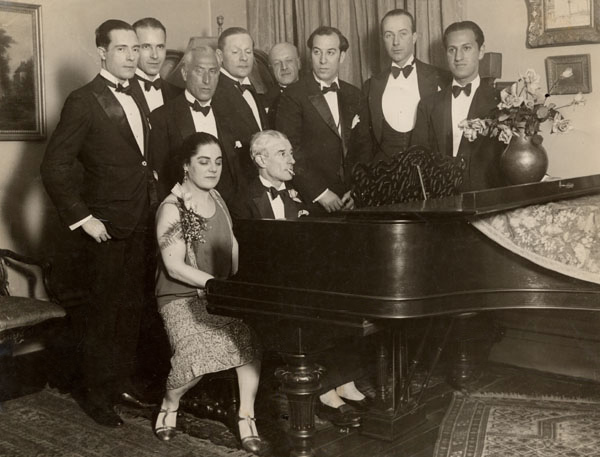
Maurice Ravel at the piano with Éva Gauthier in 1928; George Gershwin listens at right.

This is a list of notable events in music that took place in the year 1928.

== Specific locations ==
- 1928 in British music
- 1928 in Norwegian music

== Specific genres ==
- 1928 in country music
- 1928 in jazz

== Events ==
- April 27 – Igor Stravinsky's ballet Apollon musagète receives its première in Washington.
- May 5 – Composers Alban Berg and George Gershwin meet for the first time, in Vienna.
- June – 1928 International Columbia Graphophone Competition, sponsored by the Columbia Graphophone Company to mark Schubert's death centenary, is judged in Vienna. Kurt Atterberg's Sixth Symphony is the winner and becomes probably the first major piece to be premiered on disc.
- August 31 – The Threepenny Opera (Die Dreigroschenoper), adapted by Bertolt Brecht, Elisabeth Hauptmann and composer Kurt Weill (with set designer Caspar Neher) from The Beggar's Opera, receives its première in Berlin at the Theater am Schiffbauerdamm with Harald Paulsen and Lotte Lenya (Weill's wife) in the principal rôles.
- September 11 – Leoš Janáček's String Quartet No. 2, Intimate Letters, receives its première in Brno.
- September 12 – Anton Webern's String Trio receives its première in Siena.
- September 14 – Carl Nielsen's Clarinet Concerto is given its first performance.
- September 21 – Al Jolson marries Ruby Keeler.
- November 22 – Maurice Ravel's Bolero receives its première in Paris at the Palais Garnier.
- November 27 – Igor Stravinsky's ballet Le Baiser de la fée receives its première in Paris.
- December 2 – Arnold Schoenberg's Variations for Orchestra receives its première in Berlin
- December 29 – Pinetop Smith records "Pinetop's Boogie Woogie" in Chicago; released in 1929 (the year of Smith's death) it becomes the first hit boogie-woogie recording.
- Edward German is knighted for services to music.
- Eric Fenby begins work as amanuensis for Frederick Delius.
- Maurice Ravel embarks on a concert tour of the United States, where he meets George Gershwin.
- Tampa Red's recording career begins.
- Scrapper Blackwell makes his first recordings for Vocalion Records.
- Leroy Carr's recording career begins with the release of "How Long, How Long Blues".
- The first commercial recordings of Cajun music are released.
- The Detroit Symphony Orchestra makes its Carnegie Hall début.

== Published popular music ==
- "Alabama Song" w. Bertolt Brecht m. Kurt Weill
- "Anything You Say" w.m. Walter Donaldson
- "Baby" w. Dorothy Fields m. Jimmy McHugh. Recorded and sung by Adelaide Hall
- "Back in Your Own Backyard" w.m. Dave Dreyer, Al Jolson & Billy Rose
- "Basin Street Blues" w.m. Spencer Williams
- "Because My Baby Don't Mean Maybe Now" w.m. Walter Donaldson
- "The Big Rock Candy Mountains" Harry McClintock
- "Bill" w. P.G. Wodehouse & Oscar Hammerstein II m. Jerome Kern. Introduced by Helen Morgan in the musical Showboat and performed by Miss Morgan in the 1929 and 1936 film versions.
- "Blue Yodel" w. Jimmie Rodgers
- "Bolero" m. Maurice Ravel
- "Button Up Your Overcoat" w. B.G. DeSylva & Lew Brown m. Ray Henderson. Introduced by Ruth Etting.
- "Calling To You" by Jack Lumsdaine
- "Can't Help Lovin' Dat Man" w. Oscar Hammerstein II m. Jerome Kern
- "Carolina Moon" w. Benny Davis m. Joe Burke
- "Cherry" w.m. Don Redman
- "Chiquita" w. L. Wolfe Gilbert m. Mabel Wayne
- "C-O-N-S-T-A-N-T-I-N-O-P-L-E" w.m. Harry Carlton
- "Coquette" w. Gus Kahn m. Carmen Lombardo & John Green
- "Cow Cow Blues" m. Cow Cow Davenport
- "Crazy Rhythm" w. Irving Caesar m. Joseph Meyer & Roger Wolfe Kahn. Introduced by Ben Bernie, Peggy Chamberlain and June O'Dea in the musical Here's Howe.
- "Dance, Little Lady" w.m Noël Coward. Introduced by Sonnie Hale in the revue This Year of Grace
- "Diga Diga Doo" w. Dorothy Fields m. Jimmy McHugh. Introduced by Adelaide Hall in the revue Blackbirds of 1928
- "Do I Hear You Saying?" w. Lorenz Hart m. Richard Rodgers. Introduced by Charles King and Flora Le Breton in the musical Present Arms.
- "Doin' The New Low-Down" w. Dorothy Fields m. Jimmy McHugh. Introduced by Bill Robinson in the revue Blackbirds of 1928.
- "Don't Look At Me That Way" w.m. Cole Porter. Introduced by Irène Bordoni in the musical Paris.
- "Dusky Stevedore" w. Andy Razaf m. J. C. Johnson
- "Empty Bed Blues" w.m. J. C. Johnson
- "Fancy Our Meeting" w. Douglas Furber m. Joseph Meyer & Philip Charig. Introduced by Jack Buchanan and Elsie Randolph in the musical That's a Good Girl.
- "Forgetting You" w. B.G. DeSylva & Lew Brown m. Ray Henderson
- "From Monday On" w. Bing Crosby m. Harry Barris
- "A Garden In The Rain" w. James Dyrenforth m. Carroll Gibbons
- "A Gay Caballero" w.m. Frank Crumit & Lou Klein
- "Get Out And Get Under The Moon" w. Charles Tobias & William Jerome m. Larry Shay
- "Glad Rag Doll" w.m. Dan Dougherty and Milton Ager
- "De Glory Road" w. Clement Wood m. Jacques Wolfe
- "Golden Gate" by Billy Rose & Dave Dreyer
- "Honey" w. Seymour Simons & Haven Gillespie m. Richard A. Whiting
- "Hooray for Captain Spaulding" w. Bert Kalmar m. Harry Ruby. Introduced by Zeppo Marx, Robert Greig, Margaret Dumont and Groucho Marx in the musical Animal Crackers and also performed by them in the 1930 film version.
- "How About Me?" w.m. Irving Berlin
- "How Long Has This Been Going On?" w. Ira Gershwin m. George Gershwin. Introduced by Bobbe Arnst in the musical Rosalie. Performed by Audrey Hepburn in the 1957 film Funny Face
- "I Can't Give You Anything But Love, Baby" w. Dorothy Fields m. Jimmy McHugh. Introduced by Adelaide Hall at Les Ambassedeurs Club, Broadway, January 1928 in the revue Lew Leslie's Blackbird Revue and in May at the Liberty Theatre, Broadway in Blackbirds of 1928.
- "I Must Have That Man" w. Dorothy Fields m. Jimmy McHugh. Introduced by Adelaide Hall in the revue Blackbirds of 1928
- "I Wanna Be Loved by You" w. Bert Kalmar m. Harry Ruby & Herbert Stothart. Introduced by Helen Kane and Dan Healy in the musical Good Boy. Performed by Miss Kane dubbing for Debbie Reynolds in the 1950 film Three Little Words.
- "I'd Rather Be Blue Over You" w. Billy Rose m. Fred Fisher. Introduced by Fanny Brice in the film My Man.
- "If I Had You" w.m. Ted Shapiro, Jimmy Campbell & Reg Connelly
- "I'll Get By" w. Roy Turk m. Fred E. Ahlert
- "I'm a Ding Dong Daddy From Dumas" w.m. Phil Baxter
- "I'm Bringing A Red, Red Rose" w. Gus Kahn m. Walter Donaldson. Introduced by Paul Gregory and Frances Upton in the musical Whoopee!
- "I'm On The Crest Of A Wave" w. B.G. DeSylva & Lew Brown m. Ray Henderson. Introduced by Harry Richman in the revue George White's Scandals of 1928
- "I've Got a Crush on You" w. Ira Gershwin m. George Gershwin. Introduced by Clifton Webb and Mary Hay in the musical Treasure Girl.
- "Is There Anything Wrong In That?" w.m. Michael H. Cleary & Herb Magidson
- "It's Tight Like That" Georgia Tom, Hudson "Tampa Red" Whittaker
- "Jeannine, I Dream of Lilac Time" w. L. Wolfe Gilbert m. Nathaniel Shilkret
- "Jimmy, the Well-Dressed Man" w.m. Jimmy Durante
- "Let's Do It" w.m. Cole Porter. Introduced by Irene Bordoni and Arthur Margetson in the musical Paris.
- "Let's Misbehave" w.m. Cole Porter
- "Life Upon The Wicked Stage" w. Oscar Hammerstein II m. Jerome Kern
- "Louisiana" w. Andy Razaf & Bob Schafer m. J. C. Johnson
- "Love Me or Leave Me" w. Gus Kahn m. Walter Donaldson
- "Lover, Come Back to Me" w. Oscar Hammerstein II m. Sigmund Romberg
- "Ma Belle" w. Clifford Grey m. Rudolf Friml
- "Mack The Knife" w. (Eng) Marc Blitzstein (Ger) Bertolt Brecht m. Kurt Weill
- "Make Believe" w. Oscar Hammerstein II m. Jerome Kern
- "Makin' Whoopee" w. Gus Kahn m. Walter Donaldson
- "Malagueña" m. Ernesto Lecuona
- "March Of The Musketeers" w. P. G. Wodehouse & Clifford Grey m. Rudolf Friml. Introduced by Dennis King, Douglass Dumbrille, Detmar Poppen, Joseph Macauley and chorus in the theatre musical The Three Musketeers
- "Marie" w.m. Irving Berlin
- "Memories of France" by Al Dubin
- "My Blackbirds Are Bluebirds Now" w. Irving Caesar m. Cliff Friend
- "My Baby Just Cares for Me" w. Gus Kahn m. Walter Donaldson
- "My Lucky Star" w. B.G. DeSylva & Lew Brown m. Ray Henderson
- "My Mammy" w. Walter Donaldson, Joe Young & Sam M. Lewis. Sung by Al Jolson.
- "Nagasaki" w. Mort Dixon m. Harry Warren
- "Oh, So Nice!" w. Ira Gershwin m. George Gershwin from Treasure Girl
- "One Kiss" w. Oscar Hammerstein II m. Sigmund Romberg
- "Pirate Jenny" w. Bertolt Brecht m. Kurt Weill
- "Room 1411" m. Glenn Miller & Benny Goodman
- "'Round Evening" w. Herb Steiner & J. Fred Coots m. George Whiting
- "She's Funny That Way" w. Richard A. Whiting m. Neil Moret
- "Short'nin' Bread" adapt. w.m. Jacques Wolfe
- "Softly, As in a Morning Sunrise" w. Oscar Hammerstein II m. Sigmund Romberg. Introduced by William O'Neal in the operetta The New Moon. Performed in the 1940 film New Moon by Nelson Eddy.
- "The Song Of The Prune" Frank Crumit, De Costa
- "Sonny Boy" w.m. Al Jolson, B.G. DeSylva, Lew Brown & Ray Henderson
- "St James Infirmary" w.m. Joe Primrose
- "Stack O'Lee" trad arr. Cliff Edwards
- "Stouthearted Men" w. Oscar Hammerstein II m. Sigmund Romberg
- "Sugar (That Sugar Baby of Mine)" w.m. Maceo Pinkard & Sidney D. Mitchell
- "Sweet Lorraine" w. Mitchell Parish m. Cliff Burwell
- "Sweet Sue" w. Will J. Harris m. Victor Young
- "Sweetheart Of All My Dreams" w.m. Art Fitch, Kay Fitch & Bert Lowe
- "Sweethearts On Parade" w. Charles Newman m. Carmen Lombardo
- "'Tain't So, Honey, 'Tain't So" w.m. Willard Robison
- "That's My Weakness Now" w.m. Bud Green & Sam H. Stept
- "There Ain't No Sweet Man (That's Worth The Salt Of My Tears)" w.m. Fred Fisher
- "There's a Rainbow 'Round My Shoulder" w.m. Dave Dreyer, Billy Rose & Al Jolson
- "Together" w. B.G. DeSylva & Lew Brown m. Ray Henderson
- "Wanting You" w. Oscar Hammerstein II m. Sigmund Romberg. Introduced by Evelyn Herbert and Robert Halliday in the operetta The New Moon. Performed in the 1930 film version by Grace Moore and Lawrence Tibbett.
- "West End Blues" w.m. Joseph Oliver & Clarence Williams
- "When You're Smiling" w.m. Mark Fisher, Joe Goodwin & Larry Shay
- "Willow Tree" w. Andy Razaf m. Thomas Waller from the musical Keep Shufflin'
- "World Weary" w.m. Noël Coward. Introduced by Beatrice Lillie in the revue This Year of Grace
- "You Are Love" w. Oscar Hammerstein II m. Jerome Kern
- "You Took Advantage of Me" w. Lorenz Hart m. Richard Rodgers
- "You Wouldn't Fool Me" w. B. G. De Sylva & Lew Brown m. Ray Henderson
- "You're The Cream In My Coffee" w. B.G. DeSylva & Lew Brown m. Ray Henderson

== Top popular recordings ==
The following songs achieved the highest positions in Joel Whitburn's Pop Memories 1890-1954 and record sales reported on the "Discography of American Historical Recordings" website during 1928: Numerical rankings are approximate, they are only used as a frame of reference.

#	Artist	Title	Label	Recording date	Release date	Chart positions
1	Al Jolson	"Sonny Boy"	Brunswick 4033	August 20, 1928	October 1928	US BB 1928 #1, US #1 for 12 weeks, 19 total weeks, 938,466 sales
2	Jimmie Rodgers	"Blue Yodel No. 1 (T for Texas)"	Victor 21142	November 30, 1927	March 31, 1928	US BB 1928 #20, US #2 for 1 week, 11 total weeks, Hillbilly 1928 #1, 1,085,985 sales, National Recording Registry 2004
3	Gene Austin	"Ramona"	Victor 21334	April 2, 1928	June 1928	US BB 1928 #2, US #1 for 8 weeks, 17 total weeks, 1,000,000 sales
4	Paul Whiteman and His Orchestra	"My Angel"	Victor 21388	April 21, 1928	July 1928	US BB 1928 #3, US #1 for 6 weeks, 16 total weeks
5	Gene Austin	"Jeannine, I Dream of Lilac Time"	Victor 21564	June 26, 1928	September 7, 1928	US BB 1928 #4, US #1 for 5 weeks, 15 total weeks
6	Paul Whiteman and His Concert Orchestra v_The Rhythm Boys	"Among My Souvenirs"	Victor 35877	November 22, 1927	February 1928	US BB 1928 #5, US #1 for 4 weeks, 13 total weeks
7	Paul Whiteman and His Orchestra	"Ramona"	Victor 21214	January 4, 1928	March 16, 1928	US BB 1928 #6, US #1 for 3 weeks, 12 total weeks
8	Al Jolson	"There's a Rainbow 'Round My Shoulder"	Brunswick 4033	August 20, 1928	October 1928	US BB 1928 #7, US #1 for 2 weeks, 13 total weeks
9	Paul Whiteman and His Orchestra v_Rhythm Boys	"Together"	Victor 35883	January 21, 1928	April 1928	US BB 1928 #8, US #1 for 2 weeks, 12 total weeks
10	Fred Waring's Pennsylvanians	"Laugh, Clown, Laugh!"	Victor 21308	March 8, 1928	June 1928	US BB 1928 #9, US #1 for 1 week, 12 total weeks
11	Cliff Edwards	"I Can't Give You Anything but Love"	Columbia 1471-D	July 3, 1928	September 1928	US BB 1928 #10, US #1 for 1 week, 11 total weeks
12	Paul Whiteman and His Orchestra v_Bing Crosby	"Ol' Man River"	Victor 21218	January 11, 1928	April 1928	US BB 1928 #11, US #1 for 1 week, 11 total weeks
13	Gene Austin	"Girl Of My Dreams"	Victor 21334	April 2, 1928	May 1928	US BB 1928 #12, US #2 for 3 weeks, 13 total weeks, 408,684 sales
14	Al Jolson	"Mother of Mine, I Still Have You"	Brunswick 3719	November 11, 1927	October 1928	US BB 1928 #13, US #2 for 3 weeks, 8 total weeks
15	Nat Shilkret and the Troubadors Orchestra	"Diane (I'm In Heaven When I See You Smile)"	Victor 21000	October 7, 1927	December 1927	US BB 1928 #14, US #2 for 3 weeks, 8 total weeks
16	Nat Shilkret and the Victor Orchestra	"Jeannine (I Dream of Lilac Time)"	Victor 21572	July 27, 1928	October 1928	US BB 1928 #15, US #2 for 3 weeks, 8 total weeks
17	Al Jolson	"My Mammy"	Brunswick 3912	March 31, 1928	May 1928	US BB 1928 #17, US #2 for 2 weeks, 7 total weeks
18	Vincent Lopez and His Orchestra	"My Angel (Angela Mia)"	Brunswick 3927	April 26, 1928	June 1928	US BB 1928 #18, US #2 for 2 weeks, 7 total weeks
19	The Knickerbockers (Ben Selvin Orchestra)	"I Can't Give You Anything but Love"	Columbia 1424	June 1, 1928	August 1928	US BB 1928 #19, US #2 for 1 week, 14 total weeks
20	Fred Waring's Pennsylvanians	"Ah! Sweet Mystery of Life"	Victor 35921	April 17, 1928	July 1928	US BB 1928 #20, US #2 for 1 week, 9 total weeks
24	Gene Austin	"My Melancholy Baby"	Victor 21015	September 14, 1927	December 1927	US Billboard 1928 #24, US #3 for 1 week, 8 total weeks

=== 1928 Harlem Hit Parade (non-official) ===
(created with Popular Music Chart Entries)

#	Artist	Title	Label	Recording Date	Release date	Chart Positions
1	Helen Morgan	"Can't Help Lovin' Dat Man"	Victor 21238	February 28, 1928	April 23, 1928	US BB 1928 #78, US #7 for 1 week, 4 total weeks
2	Paul Whiteman and His Concert Orchestra v_Paul Robeson	"Ol' Man River"	Victor 35912	March 1, 1928	May 1928	US BB 1928 #80, US #7 for 1 week, 4 total weeks
3	Louis Armstrong and His Hot Five	"West End Blues"	Okeh 8597	June 28, 1928	August 1928	US BB 1928 #82, US #8 for 1 week, 6 total weeks
4	Clarence Williams' Blue Seven	"Baby Won't You Please Come Home"	Okeh 8510	September 23, 1927	November 1927	US BB 1928 #155, US #13 for 1 week, 2 total weeks
5	Louis Armstrong and His Hot Five	"Struttin' with Some Barbecue"	Okeh 8566	December 9, 1927	May 1928	US BB 1928 #157, US #14 for 1 week, 3 total weeks
6	Duke Ellington and His Orchestra	"Black and Tan Fantasie"	Victor 21137	October 26, 1927	February 3, 1928	US BB 1928 #170, US #15 for 1 week, 3 total weeks

=== Other important recordings ===
- "The Mooche" by Duke Ellington
- "Muggles" by Louis Armstrong
- "Big Bill Blues" by Big Bill Broonzy
- "Prison Cell Blues" by Blind Lemon Jefferson
- "Statesboro Blues" by Blind Willie McTell (released 1929)
- "Playing With the Strings" by Lonnie Johnson
- "How Long, How Long Blues" by Leroy Carr
- "It's Tight Like That" by Tampa Red and Georgia Tom
- "I Used To Be Your Sweet Mama" by Bessie Smith
- "Son de la Loma" by Trio Matamoros

== Classical music ==
- Aaron Avshalomov – Four Biblical Tableaux
- Granville Bantock – Pagan Symphony
- Samuel Barber – Serenade, Op. 1, for string quartet (or string orchestra)
- Béla Bartók – String Quartet No. 4
- Werner Egk – Concerto for Violin and Chamber Orchestra
- John Fernström – Symphony No. 2, Op. 15
- Gerald Finzi – Grand Fantasia and Toccata
- Roberto Gerhard – Wind Quintet
- Karl Amadeus Hartmann – Jazz Toccata and Fugue
- Gordon Jacob – String Quartet
- Dmitri Kabalevsky
  - String Quartet No. 1 in A minor, Op. 8
  - Piano Concerto No. 1 in A minor, Op. 9
- Wilhelm Kienzl – String Quartet No. 3 in E major
- Uuno Klami – Karelian Rhapsody
- George Gershwin – An American in Paris (jazz-influenced symphonic poem)
- Ernst Krenek
  - Little Symphony
  - Piano Sonata No. 2
- Maurice Ravel – Bolero
- Sergei Prokofiev
  - Symphony No. 3
  - The Prodigal Son (ballet)
- Albert Roussel – Psalm 80
- Dmitri Shostakovich – Tahiti Trot, Op. 16
- Roger Sessions – The Black Maskers Suite for Orchestra
- Leo Sowerby – Symphony No. 2
- Richard Strauss
  - Die Tageszeiten, Op.76
  - Gesänge des Orients, Op.77
- Ernst Toch – Piano Sonata, Op. 47
- Heitor Villa-Lobos
  - Chôros No. 11
  - Chôros No. 14
  - Quinteto (em forma de chôros)
- Pancho Vladigerov – Bulgarische Rhapsodie "Vardar"
- Felix Weingartner – Symphony No. 6, Op. 74

== Opera ==
- Cyril Scott – The Alchemist
- Dmitri Shostakovich – The Nose (1927–28)
- Richard Strauss – Die ägyptische Helena premiered at the Dresden Semperoper on 6 June 1928.
- Kurt Weill and Bertolt Brecht – Die Dreigroschenoper premiered on 31 August 1928, at Berlin's Theater am Schiffbauerdamm.
- Stefan Wolpe – Zeus und Elida, premiered in Berlin

== Film ==
- Irving Berlin – The Awakening
- Werner Richard Heymann – Alraune
- Willy Schmidt-Gentner – Heimkehr
- Louis Silvers, Alois Reiser – Noah's Ark

== Musical theater ==
- Angela Broadway production
- Blackbirds of 1928 Broadway production opened at the Liberty Theatre on May 9 and ran for 518 performances
- Blue Eyes London production opened at the Piccadilly Theatre on April 27 and ran for 278 performances
- Casanova Berlin production
- Hello, Daddy (Music: Jimmy McHugh, Lyrics: Dorothy Fields, Book: Herbert Fields) Broadway production opened at Lew Fields' Mansfield Theatre on December 26, transferred to George M. Cohan's Theatre on January 21, 1929, and transferred to Erlanger's Theatre on May 6, 1929, for a total run of 198 performances
- Here's Howe Broadway production opened at the Broadhurst Theatre on May 1 and ran for 71 performances.
- Hold Everything! Broadway production opened at the Broadhurst Theatre on October 10 and ran for 409 performances.
- Keep Shufflin' Broadway production opened at Daly's Theatre on February 27 and ran for 104 performances
- The New Moon (Sigmund Romberg) – Broadway production opened at the Imperial Theatre on September 19, transferred to the Casino Theatre on November 18 and ran for a total of 509 performances.
- Paris (Cole Porter) Broadway production opened at the Music Box Theatre on October 8 and ran for 195 performances.
- Present Arms (Lorenz Hart and Richard Rodgers) Broadway production opened at Lew Fields' Mansfield Theatre on April 26 and ran for 155 performances.
- Rain or Shine Broadway production opened at George M. Cohan's Theatre on February 9 and ran for 356 performances
- Rainbow Broadway production opened at the Gallo Opera House on November 21 and ran for 29 performances
- Show Boat (Jerome Kern and Oscar Hammerstein II) – London production
- So This Is Love London production opened on April 25 at the Winter Garden Theatre and ran for 321 performances
- Sunny Days Broadway production opened at the Imperial Theatre on February 8 and ran for 101 performances. It re-opened at the Century Theatre on October 1 for a further run of 32 performances.
- This Year of Grace by Noël Coward opens on 22 March 1928 at the London Pavilion and ran for nearly 10 months
- The Three Musketeers Broadway production opened at the Lyric Theatre on March 13 and ran for 319 performances.
- Treasure Girl Broadway production opened at the Alvin Theatre on November 8 and ran for 68 performances
- Ups-a-Daisy Broadway production opened at the Shubert Theatre on October 8 and ran for 64 performances. Starring Marie Saxon, Luella Gear, William Kent, Bob Hope and Roy Royston.
- Virginia London production opened at the Palace Theatre on October 24.
  - London revue opened at the Pavilion on March 22 and ran for 316 performances.
  - Broadway production opened at the Selwyn Theatre on November 7 and ran for 158 performances.
- White Lilacs opened at the Shubert Theatre on September 10 and transferred to Jolson's 59th Street Theatre on October 8 for a total run of 136 performances
- Whoopee! Broadway production opened at the New Amsterdam Theatre on December 4 and ran for 407 performances

== Births ==
- January 2 – Alberto Zedda, Italian conductor and musicologist (died 2017)
- January 7 – Emilio Pericoli, Italian singer (died 2013)
- January 9 – Domenico Modugno, Italian singer and songwriter (died 1994)
- January 11 – Andréa Guiot, French operatic soprano (died 2021)
- January 15 – François Pantillon, Swiss composer and conductor (died 2025)
- January 16 – Pilar Lorengar, Spanish soprano (died 1996)
- January 17 – Jean Barraqué, composer (died 1973)
- January 29 – Bengt Hambraeus, composer (died 2000)
- January 30 – Ruth Brown, R&B singer (died 2006)
- January 31
  - Miltinho, Brazilian singer (died 2014)
  - Chuck Willis, singer and songwriter (died 1958)
- February 3
  - Saulius Sondeckis, Lithuanian violinist and conductor (died 2016)
  - Frankie Vaughan, British singer (died 1999)
- February 8 – Osian Ellis, Welsh harpist (died 2021)
- February 10 – Anthony Prospect, conductor from Trinidad and Tobago (died 2000)
- February 12 – Vincent Montana, Jr., American drummer and composer (MFSB and Salsoul Orchestra) (died 2013)
- February 16 – Porfi Jiménez, Dominican-Venezuelan musician (died 2010)
- February 17 – Tom Jones, American lyricist (died 2023)
- February 23 – Isabel Bigley, singer and actress (died 2006)
- February 26 – Fats Domino, pianist and singer-songwriter (died 2017)
- February 27 – René Clemencic, Austrian composer, recorder player, harpsichordist, conductor and clavichord player (died 2022)
- March 4 – Samuel Adler, American composer and conductor
- March 6 – Ronald Stevenson, Scottish composer and pianist (died 2015)
- March 9 – Keely Smith, American singer (died 2017)
- March 10 – Sara Montiel, Spanish singer, actress (died 2013)
- March 12 – Aldemaro Romero, Venezuelan composer and pianist (died 2007)
- March 13 – Ronnie Hazlehurst, English conductor and composer (died 2007)
- March 21 – Valentin Gheorghiu, Romanian pianist and composer (died 2023)
- March 24 – Byron Janis, American pianist
- March 31 – Lefty Frizzell, American country singer and songwriter (died 1975)
- April 2 – Serge Gainsbourg, singer-songwriter (died 1991)
- April 3 – Don Gibson, country singer and songwriter (died 2003)
- April 4 – Monty Norman, singer and composer of the James Bond signature tune (died 2022)
- April 5 – Tony Williams, vocalist (The Platters) (died 1992)
- April 8 – Fred Ebb, lyricist (died 2004)
- April 9 – Tom Lehrer, satirical singer-songwriter and mathematician (died 2025)
- April 12 – Jean-François Paillard, French conductor (died 2013)
- April 14 – Egil Monn-Iversen, Norwegian composer and pianist (died 2017)
- April 19 – Alexis Korner, blues musician and historian (died 1984)
- April 21 – Hillous Butrum, country musician (died 2002)
- April 23
  - Sergio Tedesco, Italian actor, voice actor and tenor (died 2012)
  - Shirley Temple, actress, dancer and singer (died 2014)
- April 29 – Carl Gardner, vocalist (The Coasters) (died 2011)
- May 1 – Sonny James, American country singer (died 2016)
- May 3 – Dave Dudley, country singer (died 2003)
- May 4 – Maynard Ferguson, jazz trumpeter (died 2006)
- May 12 – Burt Bacharach, songwriter (died 2023)
- May 19
  - Klara Berkovich, Soviet-American violinist
  - Bak Sheut-sin, Cantonese opera singer
- May 23 – Rosemary Clooney, singer and actress (died 2002)
- May 27 – Thea Musgrave, composer
- June 7 – Charles Strouse, lyricist and composer
- June 8 – Mimi Mariani, Indonesian actress, model, and singer (died 1971)
- June 10 – Carl Dahlhaus, musicologist and editor (died 1989)
- June 12
  - Vic Damone, singer (died 2018)
  - Richard M. Sherman, songwriter (died 2024)
- June 19 – Tommy DeVito (The Four Seasons) (died 2020)
- June 26 – Jacob Druckman, composer (died 1996)
- July 1 – Bobby Day, singer, songwriter (died 1990)
- July 3 – Edward Greenfield, critic (died 2015)
- July 12 – S. R. Janakiraman, Indian Carnatic vocalist and musicologist
- July 13 – Leroy Vinnegar, American bassist (died 1999)
- July 16
  - Concha Valdés Miranda, Cuban songwriter (died 2017)
  - Bella Davidovich, pianist
- July 22 – Keter Betts, American bassist (died 2005)
- July 23 – Leon Fleisher, American classical pianist and teacher (died 2020)
- July 26
  - Tadeusz Baird, Polish composer (died 1981)
  - Joe Jackson, African-American manager, father of Michael Jackson (died 2018)
- August 9
  - Camilla Wicks, American violinist (died 2020)
  - Dolores Wilson, American coloratura soprano (died 2010)
- August 10
  - Jimmy Dean, singer (died 2010)
  - Eddie Fisher, singer (died 2010)
- August 16 – Ann Blyth, actress and singer
- August 18 – Sonny Til, doo-wop singer (died 1981)
- August 21 – Art Farmer, American jazz trumpeter, flugelhorn player (died 1999)
- August 22 – Karlheinz Stockhausen, German composer (died 2007)
- August 25 – Karl Korte, American composer (died 2022)
- August 28 – Vilayat Khan, sitar player (died 2004)
- September 1 – Ed Summerlin, composer, arranger, jazz saxophonist and music educator (died 2006)
- September 2 – Horace Silver, hard bop jazz pianist (died 2014)
- September 5
  - Damayanti Joshi, Indian classical dancer of Kathak (died 2004)
  - Albert Mangelsdorff, German jazz musician (died 2005)
- September 6 – Yevgeny Svetlanov, conductor, pianist and composer (died 2002)
- September 15 – Cannonball Adderley, jazz musician (died 1975)
- September 24 – John Carter, jazz musician (died 1991)
- October 3 – Erik Bruhn, dancer and choreographer (died 1986)
- October 7 – José Messias, Brazilian musician, composer, and writer (died 2015)
- October 9 – Einojuhani Rautavaara, Finnish composer (died 2016)
- October 22 – Clare Fischer, keyboardist, composer, arranger and bandleader (died 2012)
- October 27
  - Waldo Holmes, American musician and songwriter
  - Gilles Vigneault, Canadian singer-songwriter and poet
- November 10
  - Marilyn Keith Bergman, composer (died 2022)
  - Ennio Morricone, film composer (died 2020)
- November 13 – Hampton Hawes, jazz pianist (died 1977)
- November 14 – Bernabé Martí, Spanish operatic tenor
- November 18
  - Otar Gordeli, Georgian composer (died 1994)
  - Sheila Jordan, American jazz singer and pianist (died 2025)
- November 23 – Jerry Bock, composer of Fiddler on the Roof (died 2010)
- November 27 – Walter Klien, pianist (died 1991)
- December 7
  - Zdeněk Mahler, Czech writer, musicologist, pedagogue and screenwriter (died 2018)
  - Orlando Peña, Cuban bassist and songwriter (died 1994)
- December 15 – Ida Haendel, violinist (died 2020)
- December 18 – Galt MacDermot, Canadian-American composer and pianist (died 2018)
- December 28 – Moe Koffman, jazz musician (died 2001)
- December 29 – Bernard Cribbins, English actor, comedian and singer (died 2022)
- December 30 – Bo Diddley, singer, songwriter and guitarist (died 2008)
- December 31 – Tatyana Shmyga, Soviet-Russian operetta/musical theatre performer (died 2011)

== Deaths ==
- January 1 – Loie Fuller, dancer (born 1862)
- January 11 – Valborg Aulin, pianist and composer (born 1860)
- February 16 – Eddie Foy, vaudeville star (born 1856)
- March 1 – Sir Herbert Brewer, organist and composer (born 1865)
- March 19 – Nora Bayes, singer, comedian and actress (born 1880)
- March 27 – Leslie Stuart, musical theatre composer (born 1863)
- April 24 – Ferdinand Hummel, harpist, pianist, conductor and composer (born 1855)
- April 27 – Ernst Seifert, organ builder (born 1855)
- May 6 – Juliusz Wertheim, pianist, conductor and composer (born 1880) (heart attack)
- May 13 – David Thomas, composer (born 1881)
- May 19 – Henry F. Gilbert, American composer and collector of folk music (born 1868)
- May 28 – Emma Howson, operatic soprano (born 1844)
- June 21 – Marie Novello, pianist (born 1898)
- July 7 – Jón Laxdal, composer (born 1865)
- August 12 – Leoš Janáček, composer (born 1854)
- September 12 – Howard Talbot, conductor and composer (born 1865)
- September 13 – Olena Falkman, concert vocalist (born 1849)
- October 9 – Frank Ellsworth Olds, brass instrument manufacturer (born 1861)
- October 30
  - Percy Anderson, D'Oyly Carte stage designer (born 1851)
  - Oscar Sonneck, musicologist (born 1873)
- November 7 – Mattia Battistini, operatic baritone (born 1856)
- November 10 – Anita Berber, dancer (born 1899)
- November 13 – Enrico Cecchetti, dancer (born 1850)
- November 26 – Herbert Sullivan, nephew and biographer of Sir Arthur Sullivan (born 1868)
- November 30 – Rabbit Brown, American country blues musician (born 1885)
- December 3 – Theodor von Frimmel, musicologist (born 1853)
- December 24 – Nicolae Leonard, operatic tenor (born 1886)
- date unknown
  - Celeste Farotti, violin-maker (born 1864)
  - Lillie de Hegermann-Lindencrone, singer (born 1844)
