= Jolson (musical) =

1995 musical about Al Jolson

Jolson is a musical with a book by Francis Essex and Rob Bettinson and a score composed of tunes by some of the all-time greatest songwriters of Tin Pan Alley.

== Premise ==
Based on the life of singer Al Jolson, one of America's most popular entertainers, it spans thirty years of his career. Out of the limelight, the plot emphasizes his personal faults as much as it does his professional successes. Other major characters include his wife Ruby Keeler and his longtime friend and agent Louis Epstein.

== Productions ==
The West End production, directed by Bettinson, opened on October 26, 1995 at the Victoria Palace Theatre, where it ran for seventeen months. The cast included Brian Conley as Jolson, Sally Ann Triplett as Keeler, John Bennett as Epstein, Julie Armstrong, Alison Carter & Helen McNee as The Rooney Sisters.

An original cast album was recorded live during the performances of February 29, March 1, and March 2, 1996 and released by First Night Records.

Jolson - The Musical was staged at the Royal Alexandra Theatre in Toronto from June through October 1997. A proposed move to Broadway never materialized. However, a national US tour did occur beginning in October 1998, with the production performing in 34 cities.

== Song list ==
- "I'm Sitting on Top of the World"
- "Rock-a-Bye Your Baby with a Dixie Melody"
- "Toot, Toot, Tootsie (Goo' Bye!)"
- "There's a Rainbow 'Round My Shoulder"
- "Let Me Sing and I'm Happy"
- "For Me and My Gal"
- "You Made Me Love You (I Didn't Want to Do It)"
- "Swanee"
- "California, Here I Come"
- "Blue Skies"
- "My Mammy"
- "This is the Army, Mr. Jones"
- "I'm Just Wild About Harry"
- "I Only Have Eyes for You"
- "Waiting for the Robert E. Lee"
- "Swanee"
- "Baby Face"
- "Sonny Boy"
- "The Spaniard That Blighted My Life"
- "I'm Just Wild About Harry"
- "Around a Quarter to Nine"
- "Carolina in the Morning"
- "Give My Regards to Broadway"
- "My Mammy (Reprise)"

== Reception ==
Variety received the show negatively, calling it "dull" and criticizing it for overlooking the more controversial parts of Jolson's life and performances.

== Awards ==
- Jolson won the American Express Laurence Olivier Award for Best New Musical.
- Nom - Conley for Best Actor in a Musical.
- Nom - Bennett for Best Supporting Performance in a Musical.

== See also ==
- Jolson Tonight
