= Say It with Songs =

1929 film

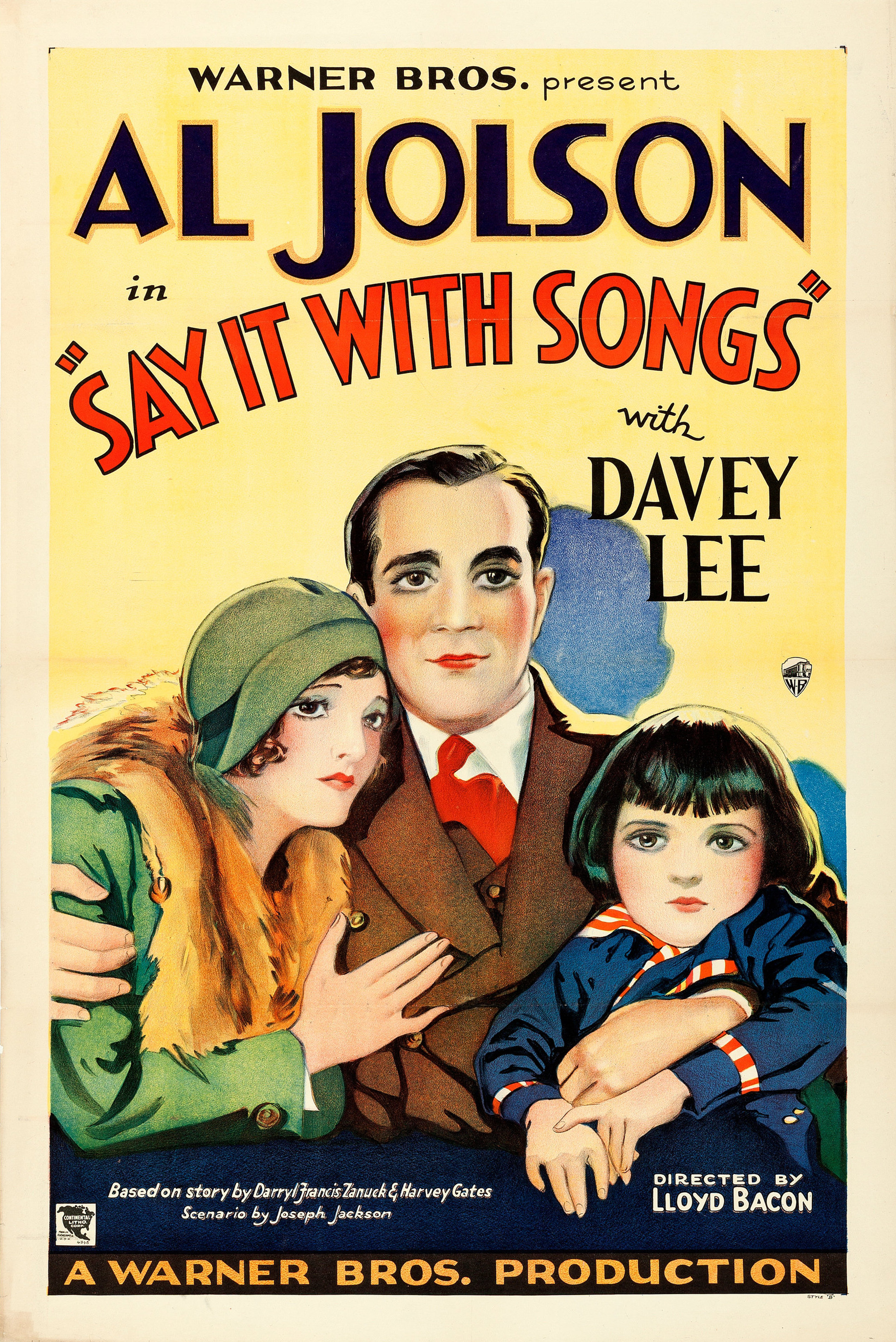
- Style "B" theatrical release poster
- Directed by: Lloyd Bacon
- Written by: Joseph Jackson; Darryl F. Zanuck; Harvey Gates
- Starring: Al Jolson
- Cinematography: Lee Garmes
- Edited by: Owen Marks
- Music by: Dave Dreyer; Billy Rose
- Production company: Warner Bros. Pictures
- Distributed by: Warner Bros. Pictures
- Release date: August 6, 1929
- Running time: 105 minutes 95 minutes (extant)
- Country: United States
- Language: English
- Budget: $470,000
- Box office: $2,266,000 (worldwide rentals)

Say It with Songs is a 1929 American sound (All-Talking) pre-Code musical drama film, directed by Lloyd Bacon and released by Warner Bros. Pictures. The film stars Al Jolson and Davey Lee and was a follow-up to their previous film, The Singing Fool (1928).

As per U.S. copyright law, the film entered the public domain on January 1, 2025.

== Plot ==
Joe Lane, radio entertainer and songwriter, learns that the manager of the studio, Arthur Phillips, has made improper advances to his wife, Katherine. Infuriated, Lane engages him in a fight, and the encounter results in Phillips' accidental death. Joe goes to prison and soon insists that Katherine divorce him, for her and their son's sake, and marry her employer, Dr. Merrill, since Joe has learned the doctor has feelings for Katherine and would provide for them well. When Joe is released he visits his son, Little Pal, at school and they embrace during outdoor recess. Joe says goodbye when recess is over, but Little Pal follows Joe downtown and is soon struck by a truck, causing the paralysis of his legs and loss of his voice.

Joe takes the boy to Dr. Merrill, who long ago proposed to Katherine, but she had politely declined and told the doctor that she still loved Joe. Dr. Merrill says he will either operate for free if Joe relinquishes Little Pal to his mother's care or charge a large fee if Joe insists on keeping the boy to himself. Joe panics and leaves with the boy, but soon realizes his mistake and brings Little Pal back for the surgery. After obtaining Joe's promise that he will return Little Pal to his mother, Merrill operates and restores the use of the boy's legs. Little Pal's voice is regained later when Katherine plays a recording by Joe, "Little Pal", at his bedtime and Little Pal dreams of a tender visit with his father holding him in his arms and singing to him. Joe returns to work, singing and also sending personal messages over the airwaves to his wife, who, along with their son, await Joe at their lovely home.

== Cast ==
- Al Jolson as Joe Lane
- Davey Lee as Little Pal
- Marion Nixon as Katherine
- Holmes Herbert as Dr. Merrill
- Kenneth Thompson as Arthur Phillips
- Fred Kohler as Fred
- Frank Campeau as Officer
- John Bowers as Dr. Byrnes

== Songs ==
- "Used to You"
- "Little Pal"
- "I'm in Seventh Heaven"
- "Why Can't You?"
- "One Sweet Kiss"
- "Little Pal"
- "I'm in Seventh Heaven"
- "I'm Ka-razy for You" (Missing from existing prints)
- "Back in Your Own Back Yard" (Missing from existing prints)

== Production ==
Say It With Songs reunited Al Jolson with the boy actor, Davey Lee, of The Singing Fool fame, who had enthralled audiences in 1928. This, Jolson's third feature film, contains several firsts in his movie career: his first full-length talkie (unlike his previous two efforts, which were part-talkies with long sections of an essential silent picture – with a synchronized score and sound effects added – in addition to talking and singing sequences), his first film not to present him singing a song in blackface, and his first film to flop at the box office. It was also one of the few films in his career in which his on-screen character is not named Al, and the second and last to cast him as a married man.

== Reception ==
The film in its surviving form

Reviews from critics were mostly negative. Mordaunt Hall of The New York Times wrote that in "later episodes it lapses into sentimentality that makes it somewhat tedious, except for the singing of Mr. Jolson. Even the lines in some of Mr. Jolson's songs detract from their value, for his tuneful exhortation to a group of convicts is by no means inspiring." John Mosher of The New Yorker called it long and "blatantly sentimental", adding, "Even the fantastically happy ending, when the sound of his voice cures the child of aphasia, does not eradicate the general impression of dreary and specious tragedy." "Story mawkish and over sentimental", agreed Film Daily. "It can't miss and yet, as a picture, Jolson's latest is indifferent stuff." Variety ran a positive review, calling the film "a marked advancement for [Jolson] as a screen player...He plays more naturally and looks the human Al Jolson on the screen, even in the betterment of his make up, than previously."

Although word of mouth did not travel fast enough to completely sink the film at the box office, its $1.7 million gross in the United States was considered a flop by Jolson's standards. It was received so badly in Los Angeles that the Warners Theatre closed it after only forty-eight hours.

According to Warner Bros records it earned $1,715,000 domestically and $551,000 foreign.

== Preservation status ==
About ten minutes of film have been lost. Two musical numbers, "I'm Ka-razy for You" and "Back in Your Own Back Yard", are missing from the prints currently in circulation. It is unknown whether these sequences still survive. The sound to these sections survives on Vitaphone disks.

== Home media ==
The film is available on DVD from the Warner Archive Collection.

== See also ==
- List of early sound feature films (1926–1929)
