= The Singing Fool =

1928 film

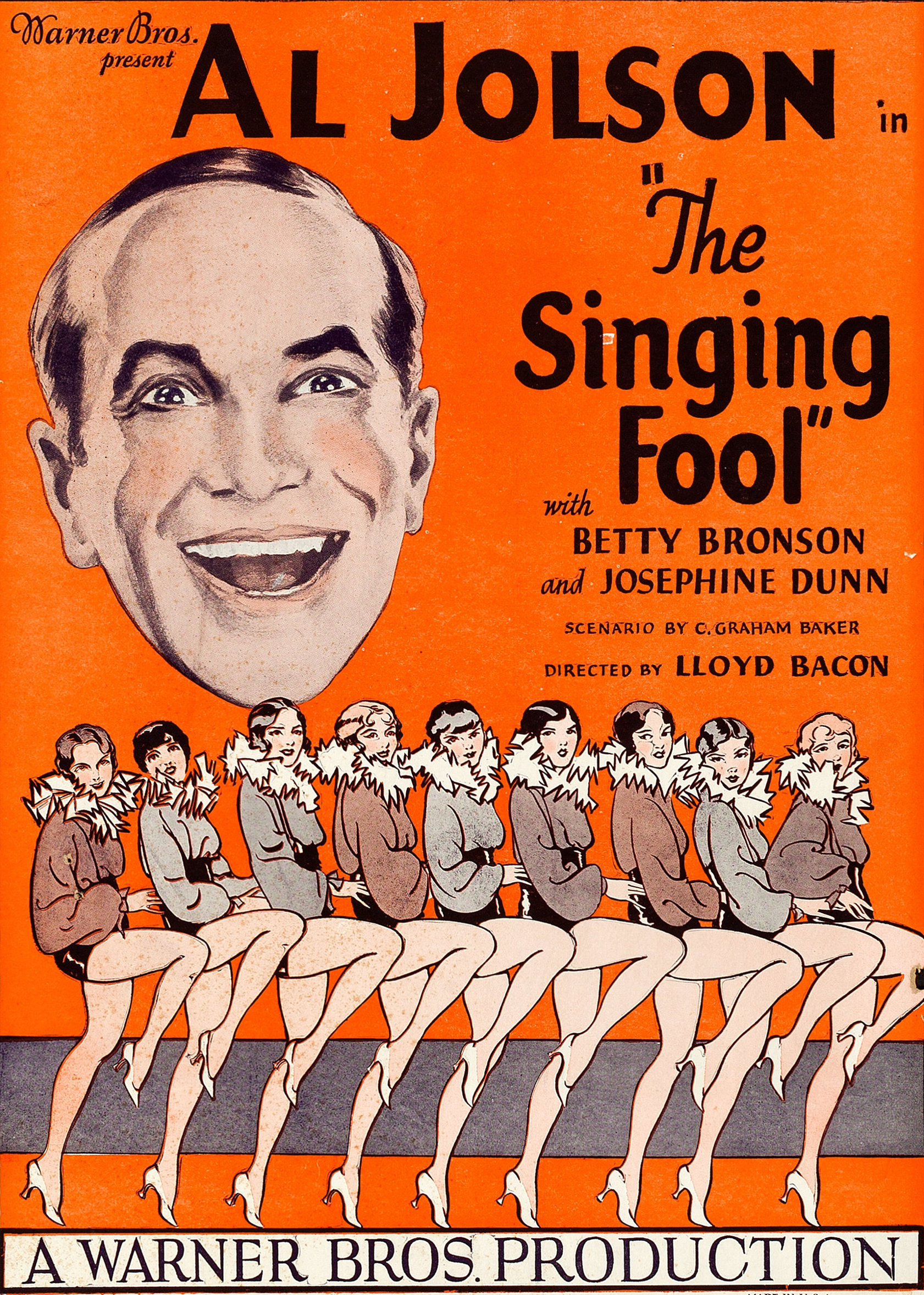
- Directed by: Lloyd Bacon
- Written by: C. Graham Baker (scenario); Joseph Jackson (dialogue & titles)
- Based on: "The Singing Fool" (short story) by Leslie Burrows
- Starring: Al Jolson
- Cinematography: Byron Haskin
- Edited by: Ralph Dawson; Harold McCord (uncredited)
- Music by: (see article)
- Production company: Warner Bros.
- Distributed by: Warner Bros.
- Release dates: 19 September 1928 (New York City); 29 September 1928 (United States)
- Running time: 102 minutes
- Country: United States
- Languages: Sound (Part-Talkie); English Intertitles
- Budget: $388,000
- Box office: $5,916,000

The Singing Fool is a 1928 American sound part-talkie musical drama motion picture directed by Lloyd Bacon which was released by Warner Bros. In addition to sequences with audible dialogue or talking sequences, the film features a synchronized musical score and sound effects along with English intertitles. The soundtrack was recorded using the Vitaphone sound-on-disc system. The film stars Al Jolson and is a follow-up to his previous film, The Jazz Singer. It is credited with helping to cement the popularity of American films of both sound and the musical genre. The film entered the public domain on January 1, 2024.

== Plot ==
Full film

After years of struggling as a comedian while working as a waiter at Blackies Cafe, Al Stone begins to find professional success.

One night, he sings a song he wrote for his long time crush Molly, impressing the head of a Broadway theater that was in attendance that night. Molly immediately falls for Al, knowing that he will soon be a big star. Broadway success, marriage and a child soon follow. Before long, Molly begins an affair with John, a mutual friend. Molly eventually abandons Al, and takes Sonny with her to Paris. Before leaving, she announces she will seek a divorce while overseas. Heartbroken, Al becomes a loner until friends from Blackies rescue him from a life on the streets.

Soon, Al is back in lights. But another crisis awaits: Al gets a message at the theater that Sonny is back in town and dying. Al visits him in the hospital, and moments after singing "Sonny Boy" to him, Sonny passes away.

Al returns to the theater devastated, but decides to go on with the show that evening. As a tribute to his deceased son, he sings "Sonny Boy" to a huge ovation. Al collapses as the curtains close, but vows to his friend Grace to never give up on life again.

== Cast ==
- Al Jolson as Al Stone
- Betty Bronson as Grace
- Josephine Dunn as Molly Winton
- Arthur Housman as Blackie Joe
- Reed Howes as John Perry
- Davey Lee as Sonny Boy
- Edward Martindel as Louis Marcus
- Robert O'Connor as Bill, cafe owner
- Helen Lynch as Maid
- Agnes Franey as "Balloon" girl
- The Yacht Club Boys as Singing quartet
- Jack Stoutenburg (uncredited)
- Carl M. Leviness as Carl, a Waiter at Clicquot Club (uncredited)
- William H. O'Brien as Waiter at Blackie Joe's (uncredited)
- Bob Perry as Doorman at Blackie Joe's (uncredited)

== Production ==
Like The Jazz Singer, The Singing Fool was a melodrama with musical interludes, and as such was one of the film industry's first musical films. Produced during the transition period between silent film and talkies, the movie was released in both sound and silent versions.

The Singing Fool was a part-talking feature, which featured a synchronized musical score with sound effects along with synchronized musical and talking sequences, although in this film roughly 66 minutes of talking and singing were included. Al Jolson's first all-talking feature, Say It With Songs, would appear in 1929.

== Reception ==
The Singing Fool made Jolson a big star in the movies and was the biggest grosser among all sound films until Snow White and the Seven Dwarfs came in 1937. Having a gross income of $5.9 million, it was the biggest grosser for Warner Bros. till 1941 when Sergeant York appeared.

According to Warner Bros records the film earned $3,821,000 domestically and $2,095,000 foreign.

For the majority of movie audiences, The Singing Fool became their first experience with a talking film, since few movie theaters had been equipped with a sound system in 1927. The film's positive reception was also viewed as a signifier that sound films were here to stay. "Here is complete vindication for the advocates of sound pictures", wrote Film Daily. "The Singing Fool is the finest example of sound pictures made to date." Mordaunt Hall of The New York Times wrote that the dialogue was "a little halting" and that Dunn was "not convincing", but recognized that the main point of interest in the film was "not in its transparent narrative, but in Mr. Jolson's inimitable singing", and on that basis it was "capital entertainment." John Mosher of The New Yorker also recommended the film, writing, "Fortunately, throughout this picture one has Al Jolson's own songs to listen to, for the story has been contrived to exploit to the full his special talents. Whenever the action begins to slump and lag, Al has only to step forward and do his stuff, and the day is saved." One trade paper commentator stated that The Singing Fool "will be to talking pictures what The Birth of a Nation has been to silent pictures".

For a time, the film also made Davey Lee, Jolson's 3 1/2 year old co-star, the most popular child star since Jackie Coogan. Lee was re-teamed with Jolson in Say It With Songs and starred in a few other films—including 1929's Sonny Boy—until his parents pulled him out of the movie business.

The film is recognized by American Film Institute in these lists:

- 2004: AFI's 100 Years...100 Songs:
  - "Sonny Boy" – Nominated

== Songs ==
Popular songs from the catalogs of DeSylva, Brown and Henderson, and Rose and Jolson were primarily used.

- "There's a Rainbow 'Round My Shoulder" – words and music by Billy Rose, Al Jolson and Dave Dreyer
- "Golden Gate" – words by Billy Rose and Dave Dreyer, music by Al Jolson and Joseph Meyer
- "I'm Sittin' on Top of the World" – words by Sam Lewis and Joe Young, music by Ray Henderson
- "It All Depends on You" – words and music by Lew Brown, B. G. DeSylva and Ray Henderson
- "Keep Smiling at Trouble" – words by Al Jolson and B. G. DeSylva, music by Lewis Gensler
- "Sonny Boy" – words and music by Lew Brown, B. G. DeSylva and Ray Henderson
  - "Sonny Boy" became the first song from a movie to sell over a million copies. It eventually sold over 3 million copies of sheet music, piano rolls and phonograph records.
- "The Spaniard That Blighted My Life" – Billy Merson (see below)
- "I'll Say She Does"--a song Jolson had previously recorded,it is used as orchestral background music in the film's opening scenes.

== Deleted scenes ==
Al Jolson's rendition of "The Spaniard That Blighted My Life" is missing from extant prints of the film. This is due to a lawsuit initiated by the song's author, Billy Merson. Merson claimed that he, as a performer, owed his income to his own renditions of the song, and that Jolson's version would diminish his ability to earn a living. The song was removed from all prints of The Singing Fool shown in the United Kingdom. Unfortunately, the only surviving copies of the film are also from the U.K., hence are missing the song. These copies also have the majority of the original decorative Warner Brothers title cards replaced with simple British made ones which were used to remove Americanisms which the British would not understand or appreciate (a common practice during the silent era). Only the soundtrack survives on extant Vitaphone discs.

== See also ==
- List of early sound feature films (1926–1929)
- List of early Warner Bros. sound and talking features
