= 1965 in Scottish television =

This is a list of events in Scottish television from 1965.

== Events ==
- Unknown - Final broadcast of Free Radio Scotland on BBC television after closedown.
- Unknown - ATV's senior producer Francis Essex is appointed Scottish Television's programming controller.
- Unknown - The chairman of the Independent Television Authority Charles Hill pays a visit to STV's Glasgow studios. He observes an edition of the popular daytime entertainment show One O'clock Gang. He is so appalled by it, that he personally axes the programme with the words "My God, how long have you been getting away with this?".

== Television series ==
- Scotsport (1957–2008)
- The White Heather Club (1958–1968)
- Dr. Finlay's Casebook (1962–1971)
- The Adventures of Francie and Josie (1962–1970)

== Births ==
- 27 January - Alan Cumming, actor
- 22 February - John Leslie, television presenter
- 24 July - Julie Graham, actress
- Unknown - Caroline Paterson, actress

== See also ==
- 1965 in Scotland
