= Davey Lee =

American actor

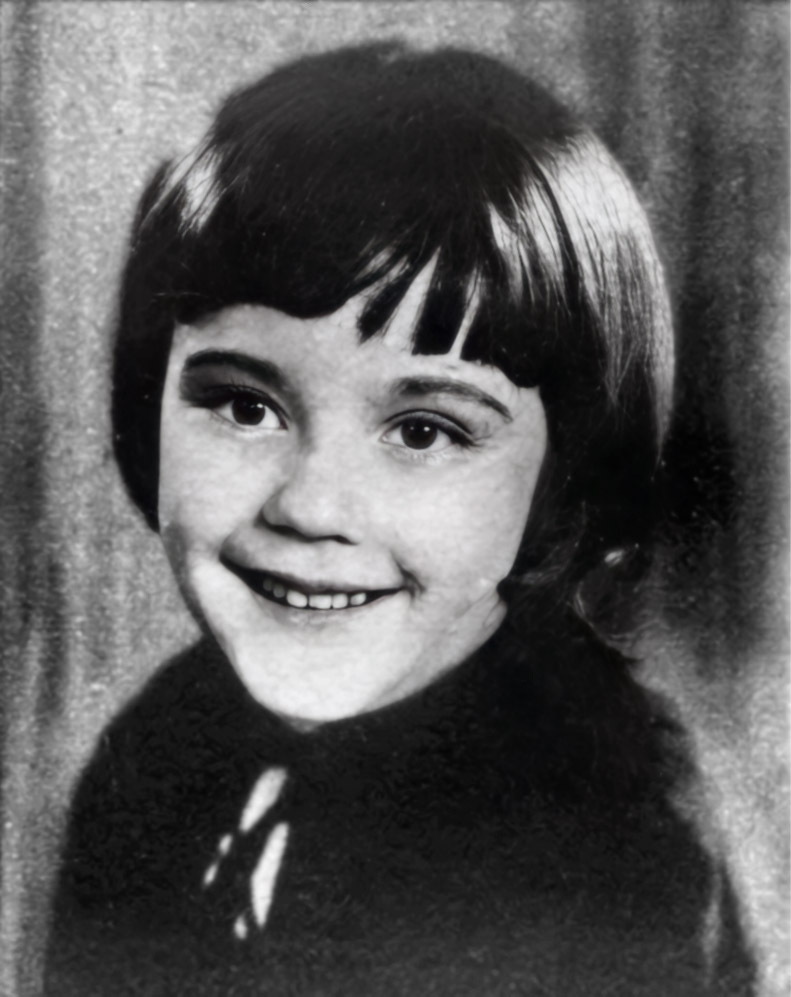
- Lee while appearing in Sonny Boy (1929)
- Born: December 29, 1924; Hollywood, California, United States
- Died: June 17, 2008 (aged 83); Los Angeles, California, United States
- Occupation: Actor
- Years active: 1928-1930

Davey Lee (Born David Lea) (December 29, 1924 – June 17, 2008) was an American child actor. He was born in Hollywood, California, United States. He appeared in six feature films between 1928 and 1930.

== Biography ==
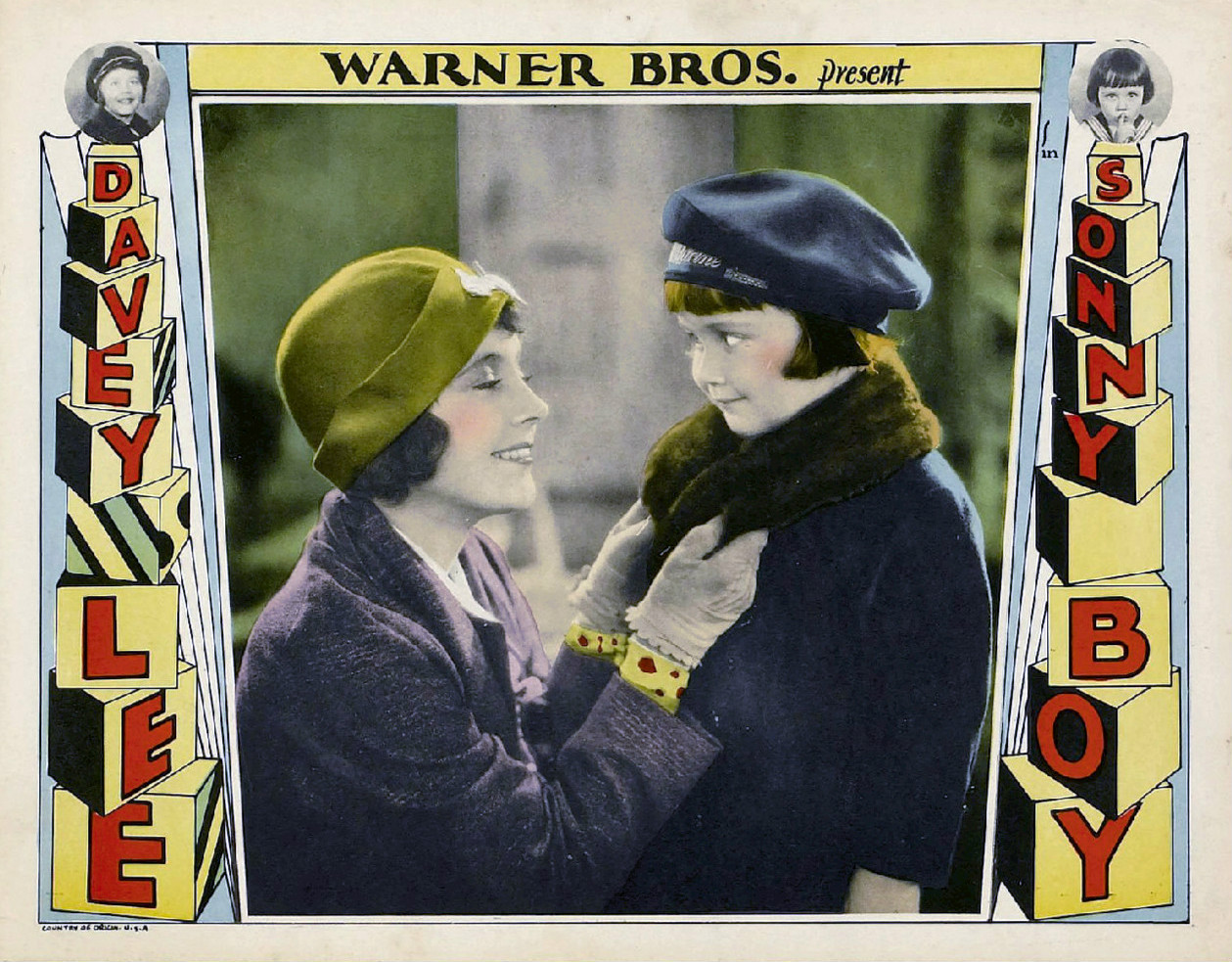
Lobby card for Sonny Boy (1929)

The younger brother of actor Frankie Lee (1911–1970), at the age of three, Davey Lee made his screen debut in one of the early talkies, The Singing Fool (1928) starring Al Jolson, in which he played the part of "Sonny Boy". The Singing Fool remained the most successful film until Gone with the Wind (1939), produced by MGM. It was Warner Bros.' most successful film for more than ten years. The theme song "Sonny Boy" became the first film song to sell over a million copies. Lee also played the title role in the film Sonny Boy (1929), starring Betty Bronson. He returned to play opposite Al Jolson in Say It With Songs (1929).

Other films in which he appeared were Frozen River (1929), in which he played opposite canine film star Rin Tin Tin, Skin Deep (1929) as the son of John Bowers, and The Squealer (1930) as the son of Jack Holt. This was Lee's last film.

After suffering a stroke, Davey Lee was admitted to Windsor Gardens Healthcare Centre in Van Nuys, California, and died from natural causes in Los Angeles on June 17, 2008, aged 83.

== Bibliography ==
- Holmstrom, John. The Moving Picture Boy: An International Encyclopaedia from 1895 to 1995, Norwich, Michael Russell, 1996, pp. 130–131.
- Best, Marc. Those Endearing Young Charms: Child Performers of the Screen, South Brunswick and New York: Barnes & Co., 1971, pp. 155–160.
