= Everybody's Acting =

1926 film by Marshall Neilan

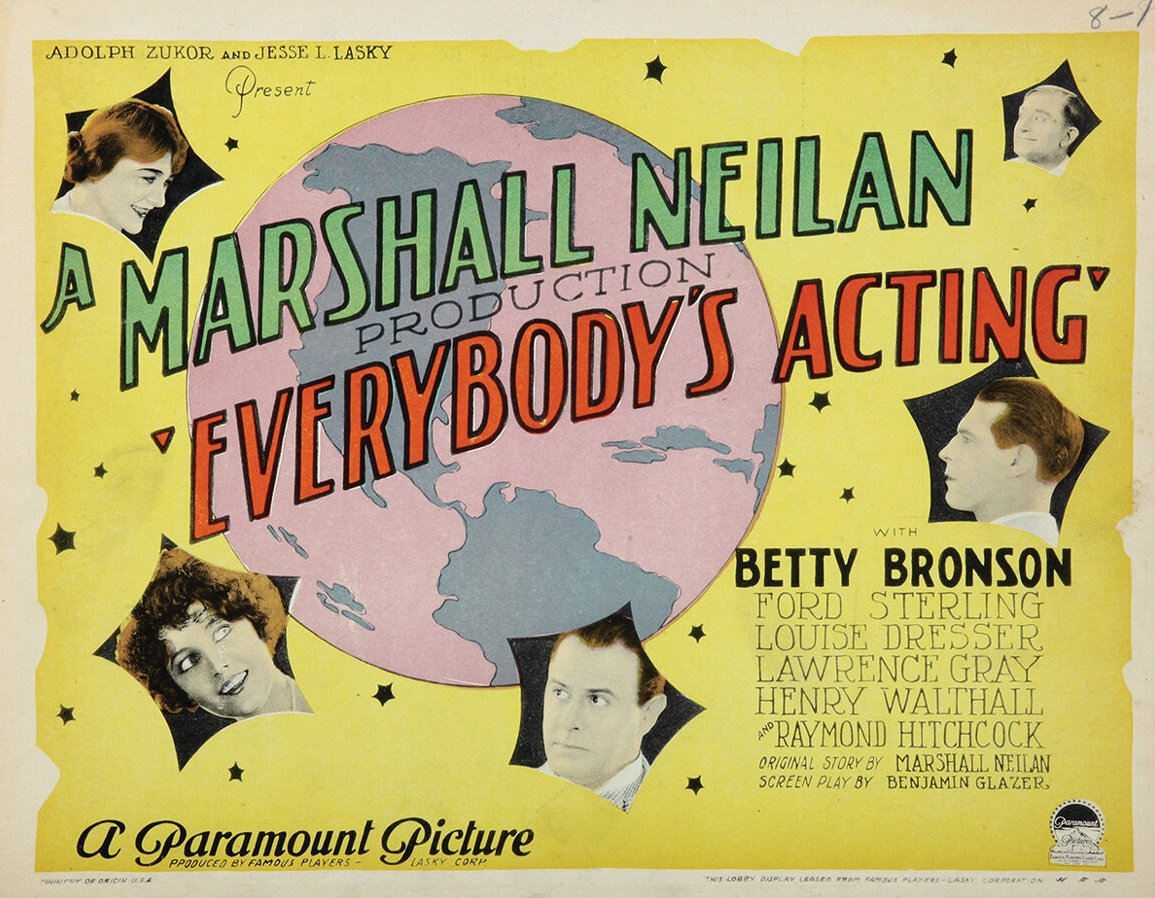
- Lobby card
- Directed by: Marshall Neilan
- Screenplay by: Marshall Neilan; Benjamin Glazer; George Marion Jr.
- Produced by: Marshall Neilan
- Starring: Betty Bronson; Ford Sterling; Louise Dresser; Lawrence Gray; Henry B. Walthall; Raymond Hitchcock; Stuart Holmes
- Cinematography: David Kesson; Donald Biddle Keyes
- Production company: Famous Players–Lasky Corporation
- Distributed by: Paramount Pictures
- Release date: November 8, 1926
- Running time: 70 minutes
- Country: United States
- Language: English

Everybody's Acting is a lost 1926 American drama silent film directed by Marshall Neilan and written by Marshall Neilan, Benjamin Glazer and George Marion Jr. The film stars Betty Bronson, Ford Sterling, Louise Dresser, Lawrence Gray, Henry B. Walthall, Raymond Hitchcock and Stuart Holmes. The film was released on November 8, 1926, by Paramount Pictures.

== Plot ==
"Doris Poole, whose parents were theatrical people, was orphaned as a child, and four members of the troupe adopted and raised her. When grown, she has become the leading lady in a San Francisco stock-company. She meets and falls in love with Ted, the millionaire son of a rich widow, but she thinks he is only a tax-cab driver. His mother objects to the romance and looks into Doris' past. She learns that her father had murdered, in a fit of jealousy, her mother, and tells Doris what she has found out. The four actors who had raised her had never told her how she happened to become an orphan. They persuade Ted's mother to send him on a voyage to the Orient in order to get him away from Doris. But they neglected to tell the mother they had also booked passage for Doris on the same ship."

== Cast ==
- Betty Bronson as Doris Poole
- Ford Sterling as Michael Poole
- Louise Dresser as Anastasia Potter
- Lawrence Gray as Ted Potter
- Henry B. Walthall as Thorpe
- Raymond Hitchcock as Ernest Rice
- Stuart Holmes as Clayton Budd
- Edward Martindel as Peter O'Brien
- Philo McCullough as Paul Singlton
- Jed Prouty as Bridwell Potter
- Jocelyn Lee as Barbara Potter
