= Gabrielle and the Doodleman =

1984 film

Gabrielle and the Doodleman is a children's film, that was released in 1984 and directed and written by Francis Essex. It was produced by the Elstree (Production) Company Ltd for the Children's Film Foundation (at that time renamed the Children's Film and Television Foundation) and was one of their last productions.

== Premise ==
The story is about Gabrielle, a girl who becomes paraplegic after a car accident at age three and uses a wheelchair. Gabrielle spends much of her time using her computer and gets involved in a life and death battle with characters from her computer game (she can be seen playing "Space Invaders" at the beginning of the film), and in particular "Doodleman", that help her through a difficult time. Matthew Kelly played a James Bond like character "Doodleman", with Eric Sykes as the Genie, Windsor Davies as the characters Ringmaster, Black Knight and an Ugly Sister. Prudence Oliver played the main character Gabrielle and Anna Dawson played the Wicked Witch. Singer-songwriter Lynsey de Paul, played the characters Miss Moneypocket (a Miss Moneypenny type character) and Dandini. Gareth Hunt played Mike as well as the King and Baron Hardup. Comedienne Josephine Tewson played Mrs. Briggs and the Fairy Godmother. Bob Todd (real name Brian Todd) was Merlin as well as an Ugly Sister and Pierre Picton, the last surviving clown from Bertram Mills Circus, played the Clown.

== Production ==
De Paul wrote and performed the fitting, electronic-tinged, theme tune "You're Alright as You Are" which was performed by Matthew Kelly and she composed, arranged and played all the incidental music that is featured in the film.

The producer was Greg Smith and the associate producer was Roy Goddard. The budget was £202,097. It was shot on video and premiered on television rather than in cinemas.

It was written and directed by Francis Essex.

== VHS Release ==
It was released on VHS video in 1984 and it was shown on U.K. terrestrial TV network for the first time on ITV on 30 December 1988. The TV Times review called the film "a junior version of Tron". The film is described as "a familiar piece of whimsy with a striking supporting cast" by Robert Shail in his book "The Children's Film Foundation: History and Legacy".

The film was also released Belgium and Canada as well as in Norway as "elle melle... Gabrielle" and in Hungary as "Gabrielle és a mesebeli ember".

== DVD Release ==
In 2023, it was released on the box set DVD "Children's Film Foundation Vol 4" on 27 February with a positive reviews such as "..it has a cast list to die for. Matthew Kelly, Eric Sykes, Windsor Davies, Anna Dawson, Lynsey de Paul (she wrote the theme song, Kelly sang it), Gareth Hunt, Josephine Tewson and (yet again) Bob Todd. If they don’t get your pulse racing then nothing will." Graham Rickson writing for "The Arts Desk" wrote "Gabrielle and the Doodleman makes for an intriguing epilogue, worth investigating for a cast which includes Windsor Davies, Eric Sykes, Matthew Kelly and Lynsey de Paul. Prudence Oliver’s feisty Gabrielle uses a wheelchair and spends a lot of time playing clunky video games, and what ensues is a loopy blend of pantomime and 80s pop videos."

In the July 2023 issue (#103) of Electronic Sound magazine, Bob Fischer interviewed Vic Pratt of The Children’s Film Foundation about the release on DVD, with Pratt explaining "I found it and just thought “Wow, we really need to release that”. It really captures the moment when the home computer was becoming the central object in our homes. And I also love the bit at the beginning, when Gabrielle is looking into the window of the video shop, and you see all the cassettes for rental! For folks of a certain age, like ourselves, that’s exactly how it was." Mentioning de Paul, he also stated "They had zero money, but got a really good cast, too. Matthew Kelly, Gareth Hunt, Windsor Davies, Eric Sykes, Bob Todd, Josephine Tewson… and Lynsey De Paul! Maybe because she’d written the music, that strange song that Matthew Kelly sings, they asked her if she wanted to be in it."
