= Frozen River (1929 film) =

1929 film

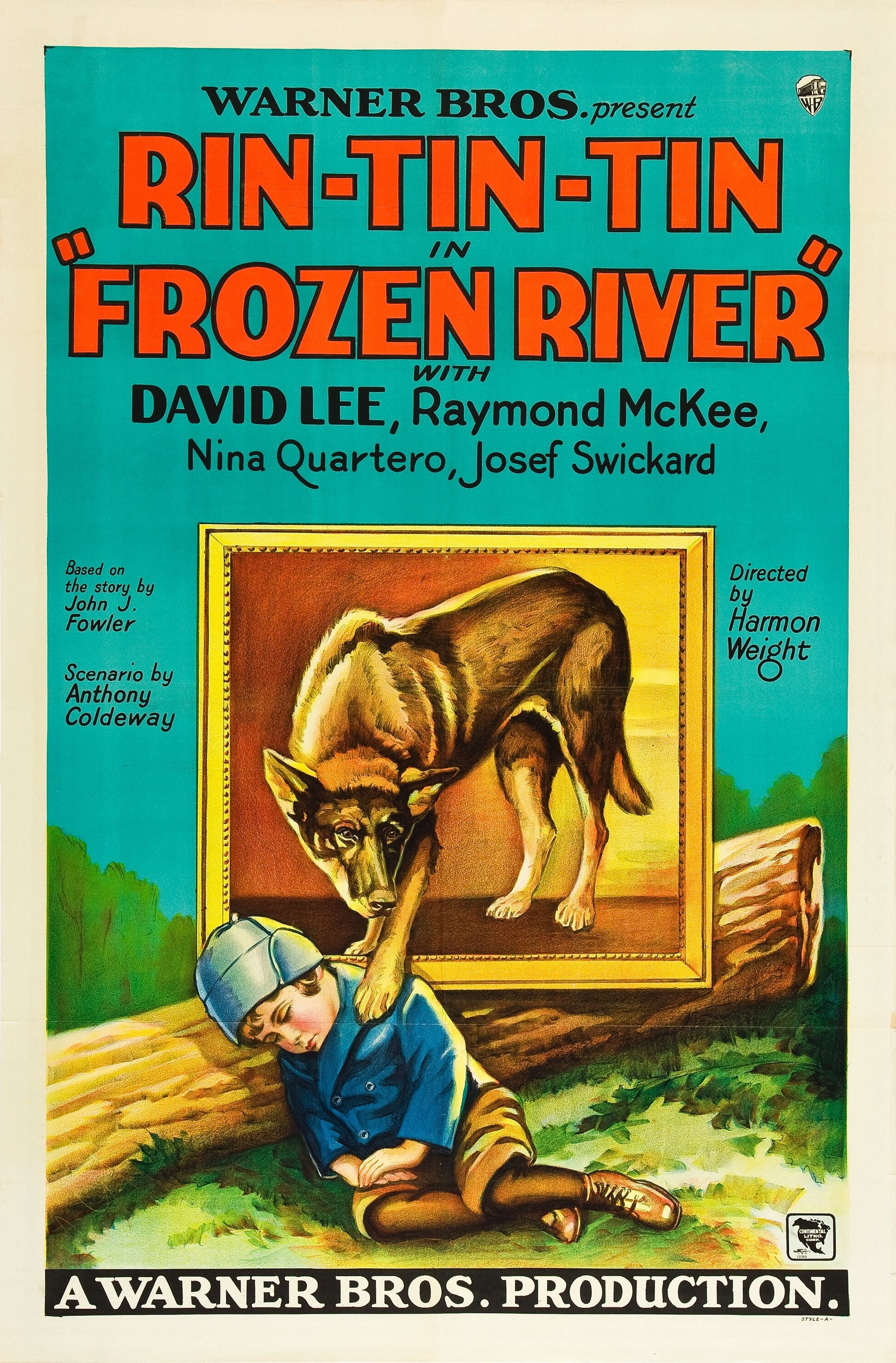
- Theatrical release poster
- Directed by: F. Harmon Weight
- Written by: Harry Behn; Anthony Coldeway; James A. Starr
- Story by: John F. Fowler
- Starring: Rin Tin Tin; Davey Lee
- Cinematography: Nelson Laraby
- Edited by: Harold McLernon
- Music by: Louis Silvers
- Production company: Warner Bros. Pictures
- Distributed by: Warner Bros. Pictures
- Release date: April 20, 1929
- Running time: 61 minutes; 6 reels
- Country: US
- Languages: Sound (Part-Talkie); English Intertitles
- Budget: $98,000
- Box office: $318,000

Frozen River is a lost 1929 American sound part-talkie film directed by F. Harmon Weight and starring the canine star Rin Tin Tin and boy actor Davey Lee. In addition to sequences with audible dialogue or talking sequences, the film features a synchronized musical score and sound effects along with English intertitles. The soundtrack was recorded using the Vitaphone sound-on-disc system. Warner Bros. Pictures produced and distributed the film.

== Plot ==
In the icy reaches of the Northern wilderness, a husky pup named Lobo is raised by a wolf but refuses to follow the savage ways of the pack. Striking out on his own, he wanders south until, for the first time, he sees human beings. His first contact with civilization proves cruel: Pierre, a woodsman, entices the curious dog into a trap and torments him. Lobo eventually escapes, but the trauma turns him feral, and he becomes a feared predator—preying on livestock, and even men.

Not far from this wild frontier lives the gentle Miss Jane, her little brother Billy, and their eccentric grandfather Hazy, so named for his foggy mind and wild tales. Among the locals at the trading station, Hazy is a figure of ridicule, mocked for his persistent claims of a hidden gold cache at Frozen River. When a sinister trapper named Potter enters the store, Hazy recognizes him as the man who once tried to kill him to uncover the secret. Tension explodes—until young engineer Jerry intervenes, rescuing the old man and seeing him safely home.

One day, Jerry encounters little Billy playing in the woods with a large animal. Startled, he raises his rifle—believing it to be the rogue wolf with a bounty on its head. But at the last second, Jerry realizes the truth: it is no wolf, but a wronged dog. Jerry lowers the gun and slowly earns Lobo's trust, forging a tentative bond.

Meanwhile, Potter and Pierre plot to manipulate Hazy into revealing the gold's location. When the two men visit Hazy's cabin, Jerry arrives with Lobo. The dog, recognizing his former tormentor, launches a ferocious attack on Pierre. After the chaos, Hazy entrusts his secret to Jane and instructs her to lead Pierre to Frozen River, pretending to cooperate. No sooner have they gone than Potter lures Billy away.

Lobo, sensing danger, guides Jerry back to Hazy's cabin, and then on to follow Jane and Pierre. In the wilderness, Jane discovers Pierre and Potter's treacherous pact—Pierre will take her, and Potter the gold. To force the truth from her, Potter tortures little Billy. But just in time, Jerry and Lobo arrive. The dog again attacks Pierre and drives him into the wilderness after a brutal fight.

Jerry confronts Potter, and their struggle takes them to the edge of a towering cliff. Lobo arrives just in time to hurl Potter over the brink to his death. As they catch their breath, they spot Billy's dog team, spooked and racing straight toward the same cliff. In a final, death-defying act, Lobo races to the sled and pulls Billy to safety mere moments before it plunges into the void.

With the villains defeated, the gold preserved, and a child's life saved, Lobo plays a central role in the story's resolution.

== Cast ==
- Rin Tin Tin as Lobo, a dog
- Davey Lee as Billy
- Raymond McKee as Jerry
- Nina Quartero as Jane
- Josef Swickard as Hazy
- Frank Campeau as Potter
- Lew Harvey as Pierre

== Reception ==
According to Warner Bros records, the film earned $241,000 domestically and $77,000 foreign.

== Preservation ==
This is a lost film. It was recorded using the Vitaphone sound on the disc process. UCLA Film & Television Archive has sound discs for five out of six of the film's reels.

== See also ==
- List of early sound feature films (1926–1929)
