= Betty Bronson =

American actress (1906–1971)

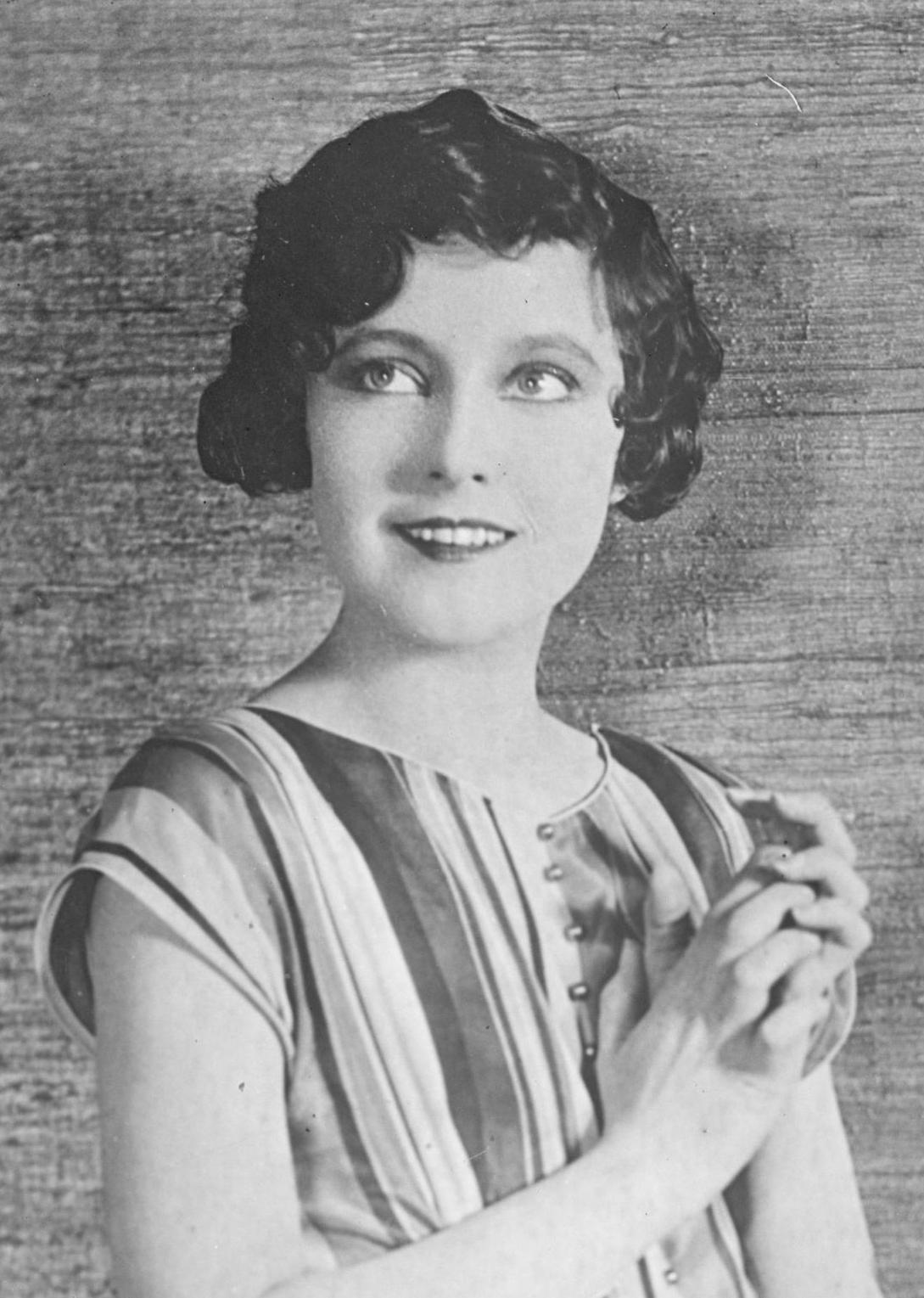
- Bronson in the 1920s
- Born: Elizabeth Ada Bronson; November 17, 1906; Trenton, New Jersey, U.S.
- Died: October 19, 1971 (aged 64); Pasadena, California, U.S.
- Resting place: Forest Lawn Memorial Park, Glendale, California
- Education: East Orange High School
- Occupation: Actress
- Years active: 1922–1971
- Spouse: Ludwig Lauerhass
- Children: 1

Elizabeth Ada Bronson (November 17, 1906 – October 19, 1971) was an American film and television actress who began her career during the silent film era.

== Early years ==
Bronson was born Elizabeth Ada Johnson in Trenton, New Jersey, to Frank and Nellie Smith Bronson. Her father operated a piano business. She moved to East Orange, New Jersey and attended East Orange High School until she "convinced her parents to let her move to California to aid her career in films." Subsequently, the entire family moved to California. After moving to Los Angeles when she was 3 years old, the family moved to New York when she was 8. She studied dancing (ballet and interpretive) for five years in addition to studying dramatic art and other subjects. Her father died in 1923, and by August 1924 she and her mother were living in Hollywood, California.

== Film career ==
Bronson began her film career at the age of 16 with a bit part in Anna Ascends. At 17, she was interviewed by J. M. Barrie, author of Peter Pan. (A contemporary newspaper account says that Barrie was watching screen tests for the part. "When the movie test picture showing Miss Bronsn was flashed on the screen before the author, Barried caused it to be repeated three times and then selected her from all the field.") Although the role had been sought by such established actresses as Gloria Swanson and Mary Pickford, Barrie personally chose Bronson to play the lead in the film adaptation of his work, which was released in 1924. She appeared alongside actresses Mary Brian (Wendy Darling) and Esther Ralston (Mrs. Darling), both of whom remained lifelong friends.

Bronson played Mary, mother of Jesus, in the 1925 silent film adaptation of Ben-Hur. Although she was only onscreen for a few seconds, she made an appearance in the experimentally-colored segment. In 1925, she starred in another Barrie story, A Kiss for Cinderella, an artfully-made film that failed at the box office. She made a successful transition into sound films with The Singing Fool (1928), co-starring Al Jolson. She appeared in the sequel, Sonny Boy, with Davey Lee in 1929. She was the leading lady opposite Jack Benny in the romantic drama The Medicine Man (1930).

Bronson continued acting until 1933, when she married Ludwig Lauerhass, "a well-to-do North Carolinian", with whom she had one child, Ludwig Lauerhass, Jr. She did not appear in films again until Yodelin' Kid from Pine Ridge (1937) starring Gene Autry. In the 1960s, she appeared in episodic television and feature films. Her last role was an uncredited part in the television biopic Evel Knievel (1971).

== Bronson, the media, and Douglas Fairbanks, Jr ==
Bronson was reclusive with the press, but received attention after being seen with Douglas Fairbanks, Jr. He had his first boyhood crush on her, as he remembered in his autobiography The Salad Days:

Another important picture had just started. It was Peter Pan, directed by a clever caricature of a wildly temperamental movie director, Herbert Brenon. After exhaustive tests, Betty Bronson, a pretty and gifted girl in her middle teens, was given this famous role... I fell for Betty! It was my first intensely juvenile, deep-sighs-and-bad-sonnets love. It was not fully requited. She only flirted with me. My rival was a fellow in his twenties, a newspaperman who was to become one of New York's most respected theater critics, Richard Watts, Jr. ...In any event, I was so smitten with Betty, I could think of little else, except when I could call on her, even though her overprotective mother was always just in the next room.

It is known that Bronson kept all Fairbanks' letters and spoke of him fondly until her death.

== Death ==
On October 19, 1971, Bronson died after a protracted illness in Pasadena, California, and was interred at Forest Lawn Memorial Park in Glendale, California.

== Papers ==
The UCLA Library Special Collections department houses the "Betty Bronson papers, 1920-1970", containing "materials related to Bronson's career and includes clippings, photographs, correspondence, scrapbooks, and personal and professional ephemera."

== Filmography ==
Film
Year	Film	Role	Notes
1922	Anna Ascends	Bit part	Uncredited; Lost film
1923	Java Head	Janet Ammidon	Lost film
1923	The Go-Getter	Bit part	Uncredited; Lost film
1923	His Children's Children	Minor Role	Uncredited; Lost film
1923	The Eternal City	Page	Uncredited; Incomplete film
1923	Twenty-One		Uncredited; Lost film
1924	Peter Pan	Peter Pan	
1925	Are Parents People?	Lita Hazlitt	
1925	Not So Long Ago	Betty Dover	Lost film
1925	The Golden Princess	Betty Kent	Lost film
1925	A Kiss for Cinderella	Cinderella (Jane)	
1925	Ben-Hur: A Tale of the Christ	Mary	Alternative title: Ben-Hur
1926	The Cat's Pajamas	Sally Winton	Lost film
1926	Paradise	Chrissie	Lost film
1926	Everybody's Acting	Doris Poole	Lost film
1927	Paradise for Two	Sally Lane	Lost film
1927	Ritzy	Ritzy Brown	Lost film
1927	Open Range	Lucy Blake	Lost film
1927	Brass Knuckles	June Curry	
1928	The Singing Fool	Grace	
1928	Companionate Marriage	Sally Williams	Alternative title: The Jazz Bride; Lost film
1929	The Bellamy Trial	Reporter	Incomplete film
1929	Sonny Boy	Aunt Winigred Canfield	
1929	One Stolen Night	Jeanne	
1929	A Modern Sappho		
1929	The Locked Door	Helen Reagan	
1930	The Medicine Man	Mamie Goltz	
1931	Lover Come Back	Vivian March	
1932	Midnight Patrol	Ellen Gray	
1937	Yodelin' Kid from Pine Ridge	Milly Baynum	Alternative title: The Hero from Pine Ridge
1961	Pocketful of Miracles	Mayor's wife	Uncredited
1962	Who's Got the Action?	Mrs. Boatwright	Uncredited
1964	The Naked Kiss	Miss Josephine	Alternative title: The Iron Kiss
1968	Blackbeard's Ghost	Old Lady #1	
1971	The Strange Monster of Strawberry Cove	Woman at the Parents Meeting	
1971	Evel Knievel	Sorority House Mother	Uncredited
Television
Year	Title	Role	Notes
1960	My Three Sons	Mrs. Butler	1 episode
1964	Bob Hope Presents the Chrysler Theatre		1 episode
1964	Grindl	Mrs. Cooper	1 episode
1965	Run for Your Life	Alma Sloan	1 episode
