= Brass Knuckles (film) =

1927 film by Lloyd Bacon

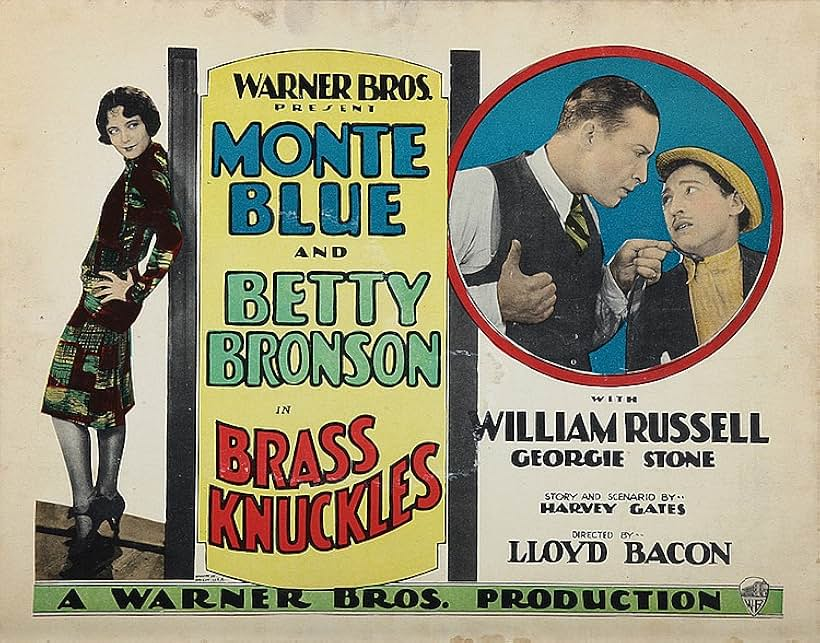
- Lobby card
- Directed by: Lloyd Bacon; Henry Blanke (ass't director)
- Written by: Harvey Gates
- Produced by: Warner Brothers
- Cinematography: Norbert Brodine
- Distributed by: Warner Bros. Pictures
- Release date: December 3, 1927
- Running time: 68 minutes
- Country: United States
- Languages: Sound (Synchronized) (English intertitles)

Brass Knuckles is a surviving 1927 American synchronized sound crime film directed by Lloyd Bacon and starring Monte Blue, Betty Bronson, and William Russell. While the film has no audible dialog, it was released with a synchronized musical score with sound effects using the Vitaphone sound-on-disc process. The film was produced and distributed by Warner Bros. Pictures.

== Plot ==
Zac Harrison, a seasoned but principled convict, shares a prison cellblock with two vastly different men: the cocky pickpocket Velvet Smith, and the brutal gang leader "Brass Knuckles" Lamont. When Lamont persuades a trusty to arrange a daring prison break, Zac, sensing danger, intervenes to prevent it—too late to stop the warden from being fatally wounded by a convict named "Fade-Away". The escape fails, and while Lamont's sentence is extended, he vows revenge on Zac, whom he holds responsible for the debacle. "Fade-Away" is sentenced to capital punishment.

Before his execution, "Fade-Away" entrusts Zac with a final wish: deliver a letter to his orphaned daughter June, growing up alone in an institution. Upon his release, Zac visits June, describing her father as a brave adventurer rather than a doomed criminal. Touched by his kindness, June finds in Zac the first person who has ever shown her compassion.

Zac and Velvet, determined to go straight, move into a small apartment in the city. But Velvet's fingers still itch for the old life, and he agrees to join some crooks for “one last job.” Zac reluctantly agrees to help, fearing a botched robbery without his oversight. Just as they prepare to leave, an exhausted figure appears at their door: June has run away from the orphanage in search of Zac.

Zac stays behind to care for the girl, while Velvet returns from the heist in a panic, hiding a stolen diamond necklace inside June's doll. When police arrive to investigate, Zac claims responsibility for the girl, stating he has adopted her, and the hidden loot goes undiscovered.

Now forced to choose a path, Zac orders Velvet to return the necklace. The presence of June in their lives becomes a turning point. She idolizes Zac as a noble, heroic figure—and as the years pass, her admiration deepens into love.

On her eighteenth birthday, Velvet, meaning no harm, takes June to the Owl Café, an underworld haunt, dressed in glamorous grown-up attire. Zac is furious and demands she wash away the makeup and never wear such clothes again. But June, quietly and firmly, reminds him that she is no longer a child. In that moment, Zac finally sees her as the remarkable young woman she has become—and realizes he reciprocates her love for him.

Their happiness is short-lived. Lamont, freshly out of prison and thirsting for revenge, tips off the police that Zac is living immorally with a young girl. The vice squad arrests Zac; June is placed in juvenile detention.

Zac, once released on bail, hurries to the court—only to learn that June has already been released into the custody of her “father.” He assumes Velvet intervened, but Velvet informs him that Lamont impersonated June's father and took her.

Zac storms Lamont's apartment. A savage fight erupts, with Lamont landing a brutal blow using his infamous brass knuckles. But instead of gloating, Lamont surprises Zac by saying he couldn't bring himself to harm the girl. Zac explain to Lamont how he has made June believe her father is a hero instead of a criminal. June, having returned on her own in search of Zac, overhears their conversation. Her whole image of her father was built on a lie: her real father was not the hero she believed.

Crushed, she turns to leave—but stops. She rushes into Zac's arms. She expresses her utmost gratitude to Zac.

== Cast ==
- Monte Blue as Zac Harrison
- Betty Bronson as June Curry
- William Russell as 'Brass Knuckles' Lamont
- George E. Stone as Velvet Smith (credited as Georgie Stone)
- Paul Panzer as Sergeant Peters
- Jack Curtis as Murphy

== Censorship ==
When Brass Knuckles was released, many states and cities in the United States had censor boards that could require cuts or other eliminations before the film could be shown. The Kansas censor board ordered a cut of the mutiny scene at the prison.

== Preservation ==
This film survives, like several late Warner Brothers and First National silents, in the Italian archive Cineteca Italiana, Milan. Its trailer is held in the Library of Congress collection.

== See also ==
- List of early sound feature films (1926–1929)
- List of early Warner Bros. sound and talking features
