= John Bennett (actor) =

English actor (1928–2005)

- Born: John David Bennett; 8 May 1928; Beckenham, Kent, England
- Died: 11 April 2005 (aged 76); London, England
- Education: Royal Central School of Speech and Drama
- Occupation: Actor
- Years active: 1958–2005
- Spouses: Patricia Hastings (m. 1953–1979) Caroline Mortimer (m. 1979)
- Children: 3

John David Bennett (8 May 1928 – 11 April 2005) was an English actor. Bennett acted across TV, film and theatre. He was considered a character actor, best known for his roles in Market in Honey Lane and The Forsyte Saga.

== Early life ==
Bennett was born in Beckenham, Kent, to Alfred Bennett and Bessie Bennett (née Rudnidsky). He was educated at Bradfield College in Berkshire, then trained at the Central School of Speech and Drama, followed by a wide repertory theatre experience including Bromley, Bristol Old Vic, Dundee, the Edinburgh Festival and Watford before going to London's West End. He was Jewish. He was married to actress Caroline Mortimer.

== Career ==
Often cast as a villain, Bennett had many roles on television including Market in Honey Lane, Porridge, Survivors, The Avengers, Strange Report, Bergerac, The Professionals and four episodes of The Saint. He guest-starred in two Doctor Who serials. He is also well remembered as Philip Bosinney in the BBC's adaptation of The Forsyte Saga (1967), but also appeared in over three hundred TV productions including God's Architect; Blake's 7; I, Claudius; Rome; Rosemary & Thyme; Saracen; Special Branch; Softly, Softly; Mulberry; Crown Court; Tales of the Unexpected and Anna Karenina. One of his last televised roles was in an episode of Jonathan Creek.

Bennett's film roles included The House That Dripped Blood (1970), The House in Nightmare Park (1973), The Fifth Element (1997), Charlotte Gray (2001) and Minority Report (2002). He also played an undercover detective in Victim, but the role was uncredited.

Bennett's theatre roles included Yasha in The Cherry Orchard and Henry Percy (Hotspur) in Henry IV, Part 1 both for John Gielgud, Exton in Richard II and Volscian Senator in Coriolanus (Almeida Theatre), Marley's Ghost in A Christmas Carol (Royal Shakespeare Company) and Uncle in Inner Voices (Royal National Theatre), as well as working extensively at the Royal Exchange, Manchester. He performed in many West End musicals including On Your Toes (Palace), Marilyn! (Adelphi), The Sound of Music (Apollo Victoria), The King and I (London Palladium), The Baker's Wife (Phoenix) and was nominated for an Olivier Award for Best Supporting Performance in a Musical for his performance as Louis Epstein in Jolson The Musical (Victoria Palace and Royal Alexandra Theatre, Toronto). His last stage role was as Conrad in Gates of Gold by Frank McGuinness with William Gaunt at the Finborough Theatre, London, in December 2004.

In radio, Bennett had been a member of the BBC Drama Repertory Company, and his broadcast parts included roles in programmes that ranged from Shakespeare to Paul Temple.

Bennett was an enthusiastic amateur flier and an accomplished glider pilot. For many years he was a member of the RAF G.S.A (Gliding and Soaring Association) Centre at RAF Bicester in the 1970s.

== Selected filmography ==
- Diplomatic Passport (1954) – André (uncredited)
- The Trials of Oscar Wilde (1960) – Marquis of Queensberry's Friend (uncredited)
- The Challenge (1960) – Spider
- A Taste of Money (1960) – Waiter
- The Curse of the Werewolf (1961) – Policeman (uncredited)
- Victim (1961) – Undercover Detective (uncredited)
- Postman's Knock (1962) – Pete
- The Barber of Stamford Hill (1962) - Mr Figg
- Crooks Anonymous (1962) – Thomas
- The Pirates of Blood River (1962) – Penal Colony Guard (uncredited)
- Lawrence of Arabia (1962) – Arab Sheik (uncredited)
- Kaleidoscope (1966) – Poker Player
- A Funny Thing Happened on the Way to the Forum (1966)
- The Syndicate (1968) – Dr. Singh
- The House That Dripped Blood (1971) – Detective Inspector Holloway
- Henry VIII and His Six Wives (1972) – Wriothesley
- The House in Nightmare Park (1973) – Patel
- Hitler: The Last Ten Days (1973) – Joseph Goebbels
- Porridge - the prison doctor
- The Message (1976) – Salool
- The Greek Tycoon (1978) – Servant
- Watership Down (1978) – Capt. Holly (voice)
- The Mirror Crack'd (1980) – Barnsby ('Murder at Midnight')
- Eye of the Needle (1981) – Kleinmann
- The Plague Dogs (1982) – Don (voice)
- Give My Regards to Broad Street (1984) – Mr. Rath
- Tai-Pan (1986) – Orlov
- Hell Comes to Frogtown (1988) – Frog Guard
- Prisoner of Honor (1991) – Magistrate
- Sherlock Holmes and the Leading Lady (1991) – Dr. Sigmund Freud
- Split Second (1992) – Dr. Schulman
- Cadfael: The Leper of St. Giles (1994) – Lazarus the Leper
- Priest (1994) – Father Redstone
- The Fifth Element (1997) – Priest
- Bridge of Dragons (1999) – The Registrar
- Beginner's Luck (2001) – Old luvvie
- Charlotte Gray (2001) – Gerard
- The Pianist (2002) – Dr. Ehrlich
- Minority Report (2002) – Adulation #4
