= Maureen Moore =

American actress (born 1951)

- Born: August 12, 1951 (age 75); Wallingford, Connecticut, United States

Maureen Moore (born August 12, 1951 in Wallingford, Connecticut) is an American actress. She attended Carnegie Mellon University, majoring in theater and worked at the Great Lakes Shakespeare Festival.

Debuting on Broadway in the 1974 revival of Gypsy as Dainty June, Moore has had a long career on stage, as well as appearing in some films and television. She has been cast in a number of major Broadway roles. Moore has notably carved out a niche as standby for the major stars on Broadway in such starring roles as Edie/Edith in Grey Gardens (for Christine Ebersole), Rose in Gypsy (for Bernadette Peters) and Norma Desmond in Sunset Boulevard (for Elaine Paige).

On Broadway, Moore has appeared in leading roles (often as standby) in Grey Gardens (2006–07), The Threepenny Opera (2006), Gypsy (2003–04), Cabaret (musical), (1998–2004), Sunset Boulevard (1994–1997), Falsettos (1992–93), Jerome Robbins' Broadway (1989–90), Les Misérables (1987 - 03), Song and Dance (1985–86), Do Black Patent Leather Shoes Really Reflect Up? (1982),The Moony Shapiro Songbook as dance captain (1981), Amadeus (1980–83), I Love My Wife (1977–79), and Gypsy (1974–75).

Her Off-Broadway credits include First Lady Suite (1993), A Little Night Music at the New York City Opera as Countess Charlotte Malcolm (1990), and Unsung Cole (1977).

She has also appeared in national tours including Falsettos in 1993 as Trina. In regional theatre she appeared in Al Jolson Tonight! at The Muny, St. Louis in August 1980, and with the Pittsburgh Civic Light Opera in 1976 in Oklahoma!, Shenandoah and George M! Moore voiced as the witch in the musical Into The Woods.

On film, Moore began with the role of Elizabeth in The Goodbye Girl (1978) and appeared in Pope of Greenwich Village (1984) among others.
