= Cecilia (Dreyer and Ruby song) =

"Cecilia", full title "Does Your Mother Know You're Out Cecilia", is a 1925 song written by Dave Dreyer with lyrics by Herman Ruby. The song was first recorded by Whispering Jack Smith on Victor Records. Johnny Hamp was another who enjoyed success with the song in 1925.

== Versions ==
- Dick Jurgens with vocal by Ronnie Kemper (Columbia 37342) 1940, reissued 1947
- Harry Cool 1947
- Louis Prima 1947
- Rose Murphy 1948
- Frankie Carle 1952,
- Grady Martin And His Slew Foot Five 1955
- Somethin' Smith and The Redheads 1956,
- Chet Atkins 1956,
- The Music of David Seville 1957,
- Henri René and His Orchestra 1959,
- Max Bygraves with Ted Heath and His Music 1959
- The Jonah Jones Quartet 1961
- Frankie Vaughan 1962
- Bing Crosby (from the 1962 album On the Happy Side)
- Mr. Mike, Australian singer, 1963,
- Wayne King (from the 1965 album The Best of Wayne King and his Orchestra, Vol I)
- Brad Swanson 1970,
- Floyd Vivino performing as "Oogie" 2007
- Bill Ramsey German version "Cecilia (Schau, schau mich nicht so an)" Dreyer, Bartels
- NRBQ 1977
