= Sonny Boy (1929 film) =

1929 film

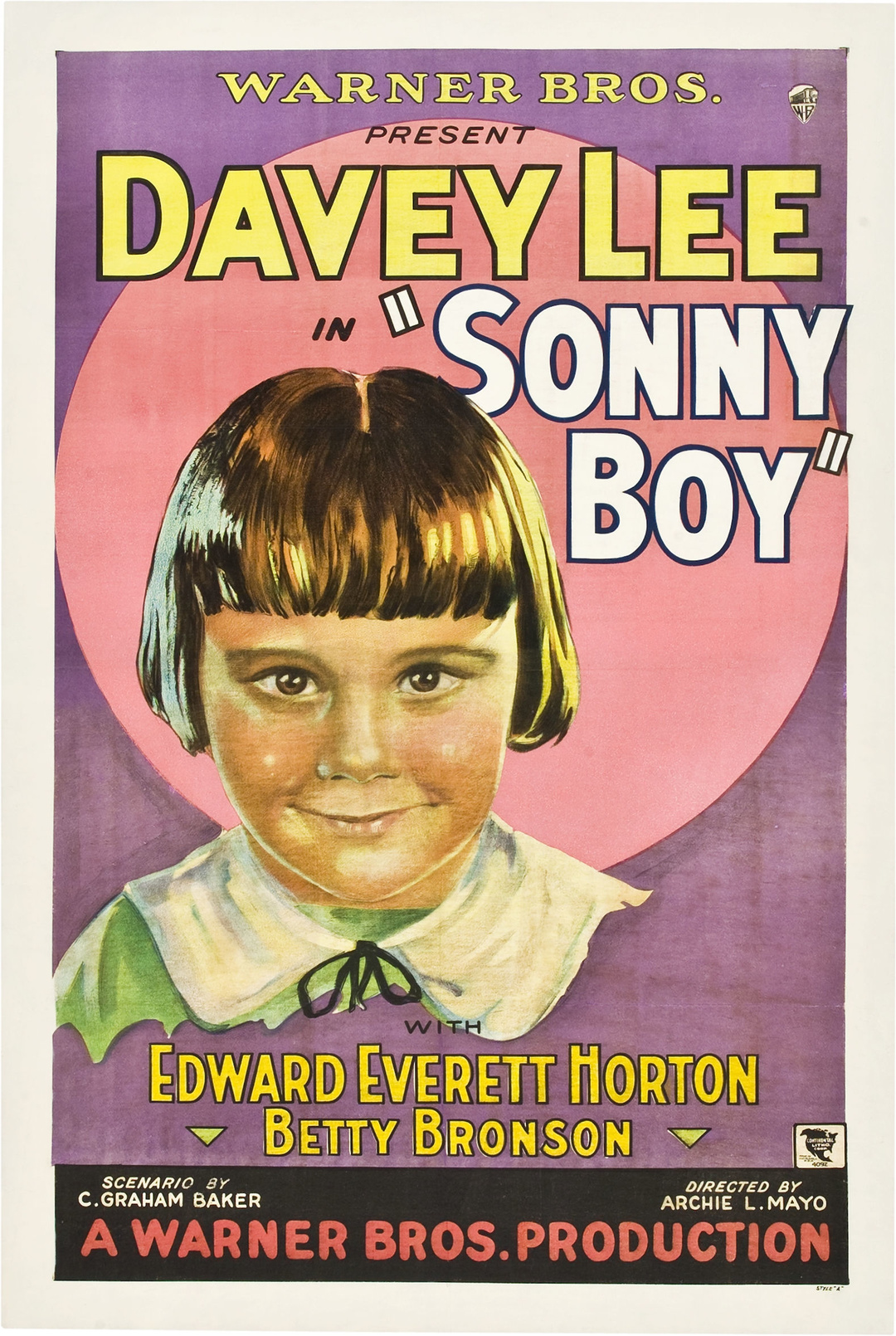
- Theatrical release poster
- Directed by: Archie Mayo
- Written by: Charles Graham Baker; James A. Starr
- Story by: "Leon Zuardo" (Jack L. Warner)
- Starring: Davey Lee; Betty Bronson; Edward Everett Horton; Gertrude Olmstead
- Cinematography: Ben F. Reynolds
- Edited by: Owen Marks
- Music by: Louis Silvers
- Production company: Warner Bros. Pictures
- Distributed by: Warner Bros. Pictures
- Release date: April 18, 1929
- Running time: 70 minutes
- Country: United States
- Languages: Sound (Part-Talkie); English intertitles
- Budget: $98,000
- Box office: $1,072,000

Sonny Boy is a 1929 American sound part-talkie comedy film released by Warner Bros., directed by Archie Mayo. In addition to sequences with audible dialogue or talking sequences, the film features a synchronized musical score and sound effects along with English intertitles. The soundtrack was recorded using the Vitaphone sound-on-disc system. The film stars Davey Lee, Edward Everett Horton, and Betty Bronson.

The film was named after the 1928 hit song "Sonny Boy", which was previously featured in the film The Singing Fool (1928), starring Al Jolson. Lee also played the role of Sonny Boy in The Singing Fool.

As per U.S. copyright law, the film entered the public domain on January 1, 2025.

== Plot ==
Mary and Hamilton, the quarreling parents of little Sonny Boy, find themselves on the brink of a custody battle when Hamilton decides to take the child with him to Europe. Desperate to keep her son, Mary telegraphs for help from her resourceful sister, Winifred Canfield.

Winifred arrives at the house and, posing as the maid, devises a clever scheme to outwit the detective Mulcahy, hired by Hamilton to prevent any attempt at taking the boy. Concealing Sonny Boy in a clothes basket, she dupes the detective into carrying the child right out of the house.

At the train station, Winifred overhears Hamilton's lawyer, Crandall Thorpe, mention that his apartment will be vacant for a few days. Seizing the opportunity, she gains entry to the apartment by pretending to be Thorpe's wife. But things get complicated when Thorpe's unsuspecting parents arrive for a visit, forcing Winifred to keep up the ruse.

When Thorpe unexpectedly returns, having been recalled by Hamilton, he immediately suspects something is amiss. Though he quickly realizes that Winifred is not his wife, her identity remains a mystery until he overhears a phone call to Mary.

Mary soon arrives at the apartment, followed closely by Hamilton, who jumps to the wrong conclusion and attacks Thorpe, thinking his wife has planned a rendezvous with the attorney.

Meanwhile, Winifred had decided to take the boy and flee only to find he had left the apartment. She eventually finds Sonny Boy who had seen an interesting theater marquee, climbed down the fire escape, and had gone to the movies. The appearance of Winifred and Sonny Boy back at the apartment clears the air, revealing the truth about why Mary is at Thorpe's apartment.

With the confusion resolved, Mary and Hamilton reconcile, and Thorpe's parents, thoroughly charmed by Winifred, summon a clergyman to unite their son with the clever young woman who had so convincingly pretended to be his wife. In the last few scenes, Sonny Boy sings a rousing rendition of the hit song "Sonny Boy" that he heard at the movies.

== Cast ==
- Davey Lee as Sonny Boy
- Betty Bronson as Aunt Winigred Canfield
- Edward Everett Horton as Crandall Thorpe
- Gertrude Olmstead as Mary
- John T. Murray as Hamilton
- Tom Dugan as Mulcahy
- Lucy Beaumont as Mother Thorpe
- Edmund Breese as Thorpe
- Jed Prouty as Phil
- Richard Talmadge

== Reception ==
According to Warner Bros records, the film earned $838,000 domestically and $234,000 foreign.

== Preservation status ==
According to silentera.com, a print of Sonny Boy exists.

== See also ==
- List of early sound feature films (1926–1929)
