= The Medicine Man (1930 film) =

1930 film

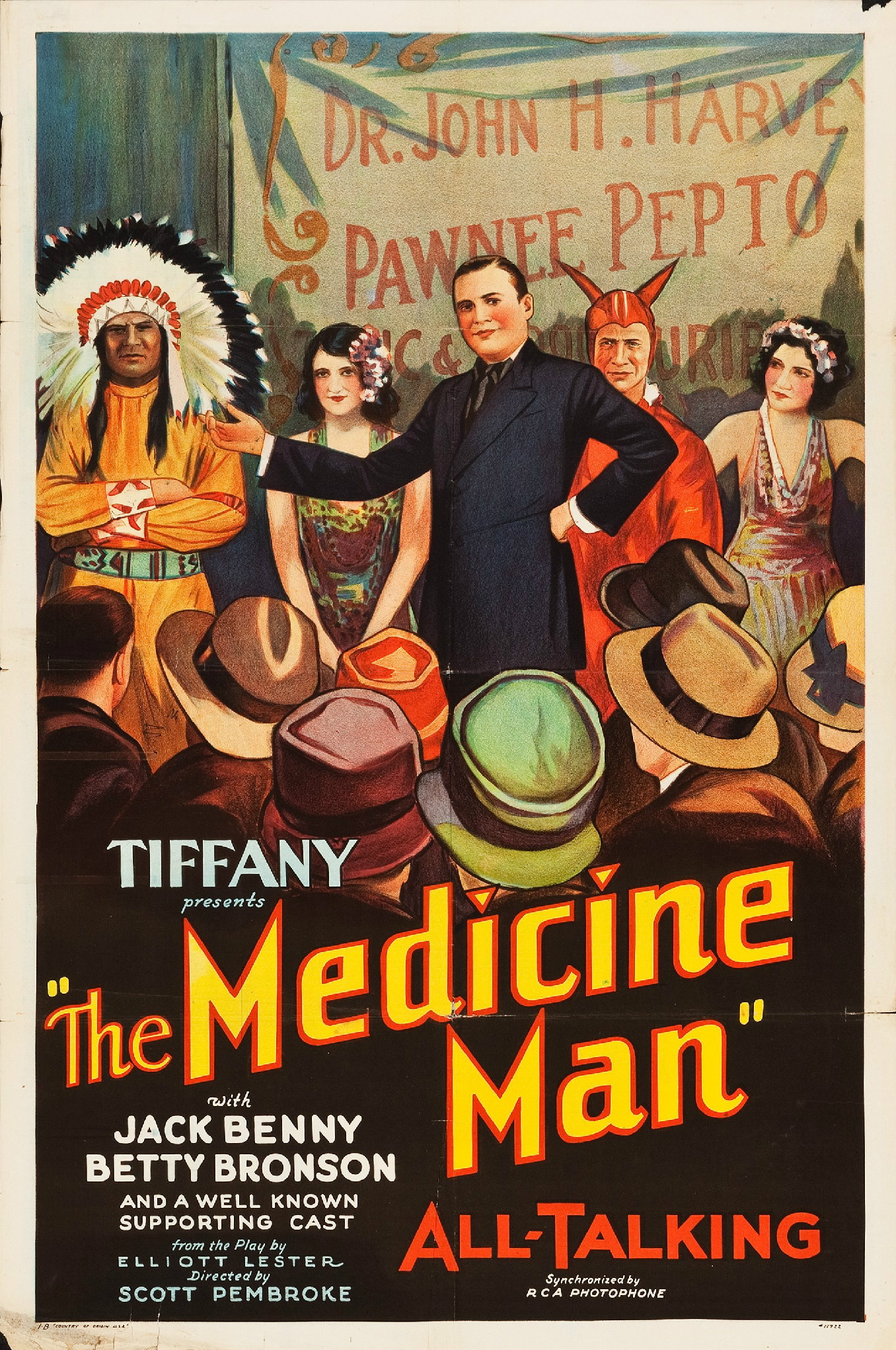
- lobby poster
- Directed by: Scott Pembroke
- Written by: Ladye Horton; Eve Unsell
- Based on: The Medicine Man by Elliott Lester
- Produced by: Phil Goldstone
- Starring: Jack Benny; Betty Bronson; Eva Novak
- Cinematography: Max Dupont; Arthur Reeves
- Edited by: Byron Robinson
- Production company: Tiffany Pictures
- Distributed by: Tiffany Pictures; Gaumont British Distributors (UK)
- Release date: June 15, 1930
- Running time: 66 minutes
- Country: United States
- Language: English

The Medicine Man is a 1930 American pre-Code comedy drama film directed by Scott Pembroke, released by Tiffany Pictures, and starring Jack Benny, Betty Bronson, and Eva Novak.

This was an early role for Jack Benny. After talking pictures took over the silent film, vaudeville died, and Benny and many other comedians went to work in motion pictures. The film was adapted from a play by Elliot Lester.

A print of The Medicine Man is preserved in the Library of Congress.

== Plot ==
The son and daughter of a shopkeeper fall in with the leader of a traveling medicine show.

== Cast ==
- Jack Benny as Dr. John Harvey
- Betty Bronson as Mamie Goltz
- E. Alyn Warren as Goltz
- Eva Novak as Hulda
- Billy Butts as Buddy
- Adolph Millar as Peter
- George E. Stone as Steve
- Tom Dugan as Charley
- Vadim Uraneff as Gus
- Caroline Rankin as Hattie
- Dorothea Wolbert as Sister Wilson
