= Nicolae Leonard =

Romanian opera tenor

Nicolae Leonard (born Leonard Nae 13 December 1886 – 24 December 1928) was a Romanian opera tenor, nicknamed "the Prince of the Operetta". He was born in Bădălan and died in Câmpulung.
