= The Spaniard That Blighted My Life =

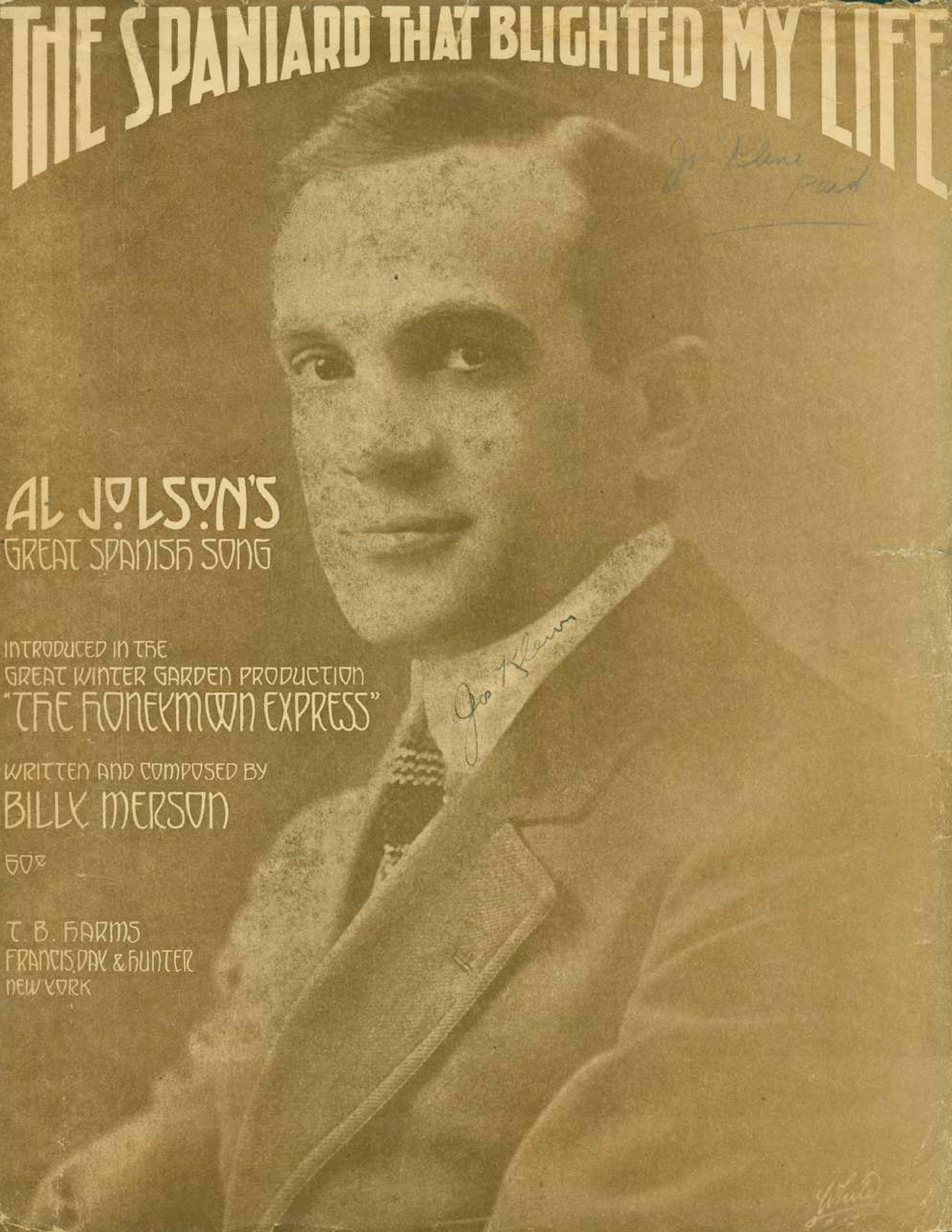
- Sheet music cover, 1911

Song by Billy Merson
- Published: 1911
- Genre: Music hall
- Songwriter: Billy Merson

Audio sample
- Recording of The Spaniard That Blighted My Life, performed by Al Jolson (1913): file; help

"The Spaniard That Blighted My Life" is a comic song which was composed and first performed by English music-hall performer Billy Merson. Merson's recording was released on the Zonophone label in 1911.

It starts

List to me while I tell you
Of the Spaniard that blighted my life

It was performed by Al Jolson in his show The Honeymoon Express and he recorded it for Victor Records on March 7, 1913 (catalog No. 17318). It became a major hit, selling over a million copies.

Merson sued Jolson for copyright infringement, forcing removal of the song from the movie, The Singing Fool in the UK.

== Renditions ==
- Al Jolson, The Jolson Story (1946) and Jolson Sings Again (performed by Larry Parks), dubbed by Al Jolson)
- Bing Crosby and Al Jolson, recorded March 25, 1947.
- Roy Hudd on Those Music Hall Days
- Seamus Kennedy on Party Pieces, 2005.
- The song was featured in Season 32, Episode 1 of The Simpsons.
- The song is sung by Father Brown at the end of "The Island of Dreams", Season 9, Episode 7
