= Francis Essex =

British producer and author

Francis Essex (Right) pictured receiving Leonard Brett Award (1981) from Lew Grade

Francis Essex (24 March 1929 – 5 March 2009) was a British television and stage producer, author and composer. Essex's career spanned several decades during which he worked for several TV production companies. His jobs included: Light Entertainment Producer for the BBC channel in the UK from 1954 to 1960; Senior Producer for the ATV (Associated Television) Network from 1960 to 1965; Controller of Programmes at Scottish Television from 1965 to 1969; Network Production Controller at ATV from 1969 to 1976; Member of the ATV Board of Directors from 1974; Director of Production at ATV from 1976 to 1981 and Chairman of the ITV Children's Network Committee from 1976 to 1981.

Essex's numerous works for the theatre include Bells of St Martins at the St Martin's Theatre in 1953, which he wrote and presented. He also devised and directed Six of One at the Adelphi Theatre in 1964, and was the author of Jolson The Musical at the Victoria Palace Theatre in 1995. Essex's scripts include; The Gentle Flame (for Julie Andrews), The Shillingbury Blowers (for Trevor Howard), Quincy's Quest (for Tommy Steele), The Shillingbury Tales (series), the Cuffy series (for Bernard Cribbins) and "The Silent Scream" in the series Hammer House of Horror. His numerous musical scores include Luke's Kingdom, The Seas Must Live and The Lightning Tree. Essex was also the author of the Shillingbury Tales (1983), Skerrymor Bay (1984) and the children's film Gabrielle and the Doodleman.

His awards and accreditations include: Fellow, Royal Television Society; BAFTA Light Entertainment Award, 1964; Leonard Brett Award, 1964 and 1981; and the Laurence Olivier Award for Best New Musical 1996 for Jolson The Musical.

Essex married Jeanne Shires in 1956; the couple had two sons, Martin and Stephen (deceased). Three grandchildren Martine Gillies & two grandsons

== Selected filmography ==
Music

- My Wife's Lodger (1952)
