= Anthony Prospect =

Trinidad and Tobago conductor

Guillermo Antonio Prospect (10 February 1928 – 2000) was a conductor from Trinidad and Tobago and promoter of the steelpan.

== Person ==
Prospect grew up in Port-of-Spain where he attended School and won a scholarship to study military bandmastership in England. He joined the Trinidad and Tobago Police Band in 1944 and retired in 1982. He won the Steelband Music Festival in 1982 with the Casablanca Steel Orchestra.
