= José Messias =

- Born: José Messias da Cunha; October 7, 1928; Bom Jardim de Minas, Brazil
- Died: June 12, 2015 (aged 86); Rio de Janeiro, Brazil
- Occupations: Composer, singer, writer, host, critic
- Known for: Brazilian media personality

José Messias da Cunha or simply José Messias (October 7, 1928 – June 12, 2015) was a Brazilian composer, singer, writer, musician, radio broadcaster, host and producer of radio and television, and journalist, music critic and music juror in television talent programs.

Expressive character featured in the Brazilian artistic culture for several decades, since the golden age of radio and television beginning in the country, José Messias is the living history of this convergence of communication in Brazil in the 20th and 21st centuries.

== Bibliography ==
- AZEVEDO, M. A . de (NIREZ) et al.. Discografia brasileira em 78 rpm. Rio de Janeiro: Funarte, 1982.
- CUNHA, José Messias da. Sob a luz das estrelas: Somos uma soma de pessoas. São Paulo: Madras, 2008 ISBN 85-370-0424-3
- Microsoft do Brasil. Enciclopédia Encarta 2001. São Paulo, Brazil: Microsoft do Brasil, 2001.
