= Otar Gordeli =

Georgian musician (1928–1994)

- ოთარ გორდელი
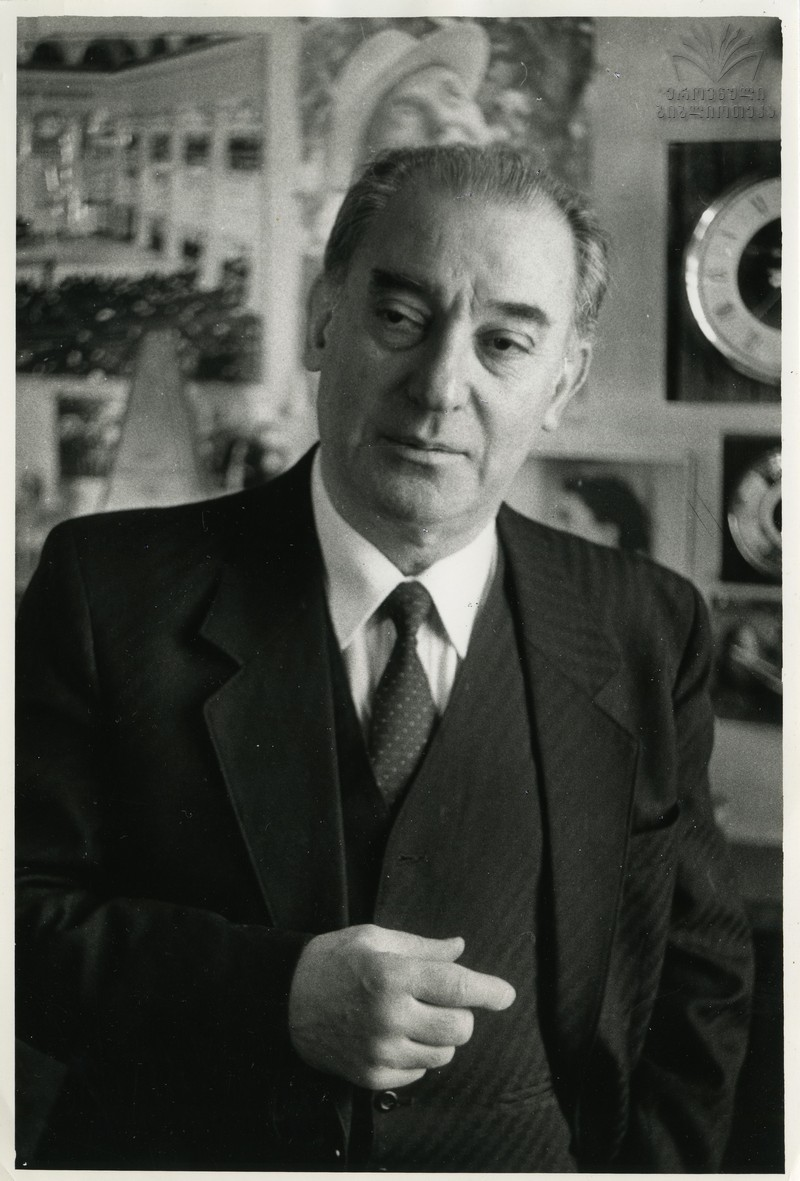
- Born: 18 November 1928; Tbilisi, Georgian SSR, Soviet Union
- Died: 6 December 1994 (aged 66); Tbilisi, Georgia
- Occupation: Composer

Otar Mikheilis dze Gordeli (Note: Georgian: ოთარ მიხეილის ძე გორდელი, romanized: Otar Mikheilis dze Gordeli; Russian: Отар Михайлович Гордели, romanized: Otar Mikhaylovich Gordeli) (18 November 1928 – 6 December 1994) was a composer in the country of Georgia.

Gordeli was born in Tbilisi, Georgia, in the former USSR. He was educated at the Tbilisi State Conservatory, where he would later be an instructor.

== Works ==
- Piano Quintet (1950)
- Piano Concerto in C minor, op. 2 (1952): LP Melodiya D 015189-90: Moscow Radio SO, A. Gauk (cond), A. Iokheles (piano)
- Festivities Overture
- Concertino in D Major for flute and orchestra, op. 8 (1959): LP Melodiya D 015189-90: Moscow Radio Orchestra, Y. Svetlanov (cond), A. Korbeyev (flute)
- Piano Sonata (1960)
- And furthermore: Choruses, Incidental music, Instrumental music, Romances
