= Jolson Tonight =

Musical

- Program for New Orleans tryout
- Music: Various
- Lyrics: Various
- Book: Nicholas Dante
- Basis: Al Jolson
- Productions: 1980 U.S. tour

Jolson Tonight is a musical with a book by Nicholas Dante. The musical is based on the life of Al Jolson.

== Background ==
Nicholas Dante was hired by producer Jeff Britton to write Jolson Tonight after his previous Al Jolson musical, Joley, failed in spring 1979. The show was written in a similar fashion to A Chorus Line, Dante's previous musical, by having a series of recorded conversations with star Larry Kert about the public and private life of Al Jolson.

The show was doing a pre-Broadway trial in five cities in the 1980 in preparation for a run on Broadway. The backers' audition was held in July 1979 to about 200 spectators. Rehearsals started in June 1980, and the cost was $1.4 million with a cast of 30. The show opened on July 21, 1980 in Indianapolis. The tryout was supposed to play there for a week followed by week-long runs in Kansas City, New Orleans, St. Louis and Tulsa. The set was designed by Michael Bottari and Ronald Case, who along with director Michael Shawn created many of the visual concepts. The costumes were designed by Donna Granata.

The creative team included Pierre Cardin, a fashion designer, who was trying to get the show to Broadway, produced by Salvatore Pirrone, directed and choreographed by Michael Shawn, and starring Larry Kert.

The show is said to have closed because no Broadway theatres were available at the time.

== Cast ==
The cast featured Larry Kert as Al Jolson, Alan Kass as Eppy, Elliot Levine as Moses Yoelson, Al's father, Stuart Zagnit as "Fingers", Matthew Kwiat as Harry, Maureen Moore as Ruby, Roxann Parker as Henrietta, Hal Maxwell as Lee Shubert, Michon Peacock as Ethel, Michael McCarty as Jake Shubert and Lawrence Raiken as Eddie Cantor. The ensemble included Paula Grider, Richard Haskin, Nancy Hess, Brenda Holmes, Suzie Jary, Robert Kellett, Chrissy Kellogg, Michael Lang, Kitty Laub, Paige Massman, Annette Michel, Brad Miskell, Gina Paglia, D'Arcy Phifer, Freda Soiffer, Christina Stolberg, Gary Sullivan, Carla Farnsworth-Webb, David Westphal and Barrie Wood.

== See also ==
- Jolson
