= There's a Rainbow 'Round My Shoulder =

Song by Al Jolson and Billy Rose

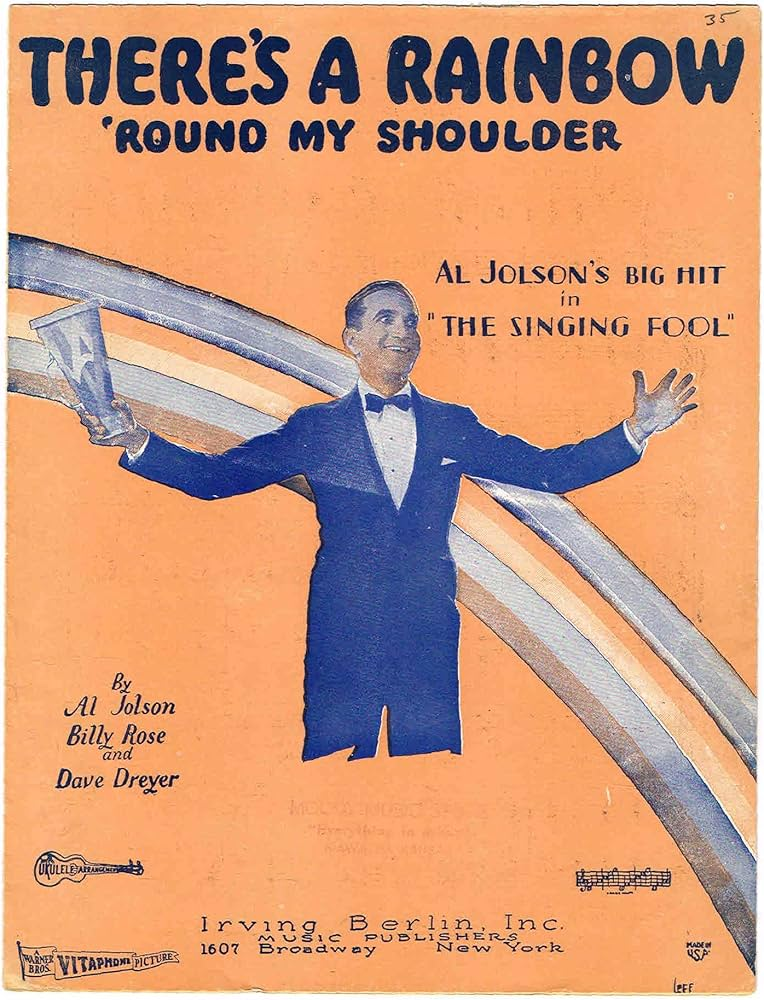
- Sheet music cover

Single by Al Jolson

from the album The Singing Fool
- B-side: "Sonny Boy"
- Released: 1928
- Length: 2:25
- Label: Brunswick
- Songwriters: Al Jolson, Billy Rose, Dave Dreyer

"There's a Rainbow 'Round My Shoulder" is a 1928 song sung by Al Jolson in the early Warner Bros. talking picture The Singing Fool the same year. The song, along with "Sonny Boy" and "I'm Sitting on Top of the World", which were also in The Singing Fool, were big hits for Jolson. The song was written by Al Jolson, Billy Rose and Dave Dreyer.

According to John A. Lomax in his "American Ballads and Folk Songs" published in 1934, from the song "Goin' Home". The line "Got a rainbow tied all 'round my shoulder" refers to the "Rainbow" as "the arc of a swinging pick, probably going so fast it becomes red hot." This song is in the section entitled "Songs from Southern Chain Gangs".

The original lyrics and music of the song entered the public domain in the United States in 2024.

== Other notable recordings ==
- McKinney's Cotton Pickers – recorded November 23, 1928 for Victor Records (catalog No. V-38013-B).
- Al Jolson recorded the song again on November 21, 1947, for Decca Records (catalog No. 24400).
- Donald Peers with two pianos recorded it at Royal Albert Hall, London on June 13, 1949, along with "Blue Skies" and "If You Were the Only Girl (in the World)". The medley was released by EMI on the His Master's Voice label as catalog number B 9792.
- Frankie Laine – recorded for Columbia Records (catalog No. 39798) in 1952.
- Frankie Laine and Charlotte Austin (dubbed by Jo Ann Greer) - from the film Rainbow 'Round My Shoulder (1952).
- Bobby Darin also recorded this song and it was included in his album Oh! Look at Me Now (1962)
- Pasadena Roof Orchestra – Night Out (1979).
- Barbara Cook – Rainbow Round My Shoulder (2008).
