= Dave Dreyer =

American composer and pianist (1894–1967)

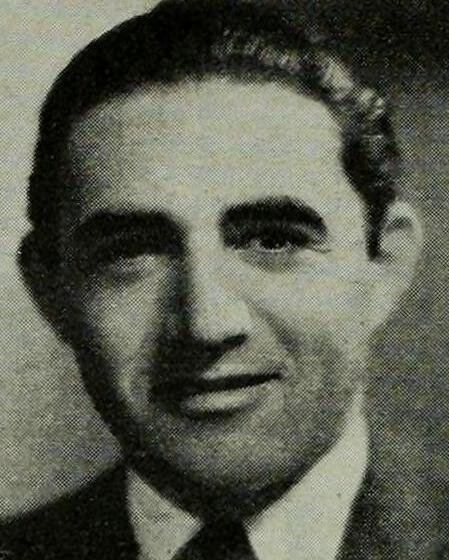
Dreyer c. September 1929

Dave Dreyer (September 22, 1894 in Brooklyn, New York – March 1, 1967 in New York City) was an American composer and pianist.

He started off as a pianist with vaudeville greats such as Al Jolson, Sophie Tucker, Belle Baker, and Frank Fay. In 1923 he worked for the Irving Berlin Music Company. While there, he worked numerous film scores. He later became the head of the music department of RKO Radio. He left the Music Company in 1947.

== Songs ==
He began to produce hits by collaborating with other artists. Some of these are:

- "Me and My Shadow" (with Billy Rose, Al Jolson)
- "There's a Rainbow 'Round My Shoulder"
- "Back in Your Own Backyard" (with Billy Rose, Al Jolson)
- "Cecilia (Dreyer and Ruby song)"
- "Four Walls" (with Billy Rose, Al Jolson)
- "Golden Gate"
- "In a Little Second Hand Store"
- "Wabash Moon"
- "I’m Following You"
- "I Wanna Sing About You"
- "I’m Keeping Company"
- "The Wall" (with Oramay Diamond, Clyde Otis)
- "Next Stop Paradise"
- "Hold My Hand"
- "What Am I Supposed to Do?"
- "Honey Babe"
- "Eternal Love" (with Ballard MacDonald & Peter DeRose)
- "Find the Girl" (with Ballard MacDonald)

He was inducted into the Songwriters Hall of Fame in 1970.

== You Can't Be True, Dear ==
"You Can't Be True, Dear" is sometimes listed under Dreyer's credits. However, the song was written by composer Hans Otten and lyricist Gerhard Ebeler, and the English words were written by Hal Cotten at Dreyer's request so that a vocal could be dubbed into the Ken Griffin recording.
