= Sonny Boy (song) =

- Sheet music, 1928

Song by Al Jolson
- A-side: "There's a Rainbow 'Round My Shoulder"
- Recorded: 1928 for film The Singing Fool
- Composer: Ray Henderson
- Lyricists: Ray Henderson, Buddy DeSylva, Lew Brown

"Sonny Boy" is a song written by Ray Henderson, Buddy DeSylva, and Lew Brown. It was featured in the 1928 part-talkie The Singing Fool. Sung by Al Jolson, the 1928 recording was a hit and stayed at #1 for 12 weeks in the charts and was a million seller.

The original lyrics and music of the song entered the public domain in the United States in 2024.

== Lyrics ==
Climb up on my knee, Sonny Boy
Though you're only three, Sonny Boy
You've no way of knowing
There's no way of showing
What you mean to me, Sonny Boy.

When there are grey skies,
I don't mind the grey skies.
You make them blue, Sonny Boy.
Friends may forsake me.
Let them all forsake me.
I still have you, Sonny Boy.

You're sent from heaven
And I know your worth.
You made a heaven
For me here on earth.

When I'm old and grey, dear
Promise you won't stray, dear
For I love you so, Sonny Boy.

When there are grey skies,
I don't mind grey skies.
You make them blue, Sonny Boy.
Friends may forsake me.
Let them all forsake me.
I still have you, Sonny Boy.

You're sent from heaven
And I know your worth.
You've made a heaven
For me here on earth.

And the angels grew lonely
Took you because they were lonely
I'm lonely too, Sonny Boy.

== Notable recordings and performances ==
Jolson singing the song in The Singing Fool

In 1929, the song was performed by the title character in the feature film of the same name, and by Bosko in his proof-of-concept film marketed as "Bosko, the Talk-Ink Kid", the latter being an early attempt at creating an animated cartoon with spoken dialogue.

Arild Andresen, piano with guitar and bass recorded it in Oslo on March 11, 1955 as the first melody of the medley "Klaver-Cocktail Nr. 4" along with "Top Hat, White Tie and Tails" and "Ain't Misbehavin'. The medley was released on the 78 rpm record His Master's Voice A.L. 3514.

Paul Robeson recorded this song on a 78 rpm record.

The song has also been recorded by The Thad Jones/Mel Lewis Orchestra with vocalist Ruth Brown, Ruth Etting, The Andrews Sisters, Leo Watson, Sonny Rollins, Petula Clark, Mandy Patinkin, John McCormack, Richard Tauber, Franz Völker and Rudolf Schock.

Pesach Burstein recorded a Yiddish version (translation by L. Wolfe Gilbert).

== In popular culture ==
The song is used as a major plot point in the short story Jeeves and the Song of Songs by P. G. Wodehouse (originally published 1929), included in the collection Very Good, Jeeves (1930). The story was dramatised as the second episode of series 1 of the British TV series Jeeves and Wooster, "Tuppy and the Terrier", where it is performed by Hugh Laurie as the character Bertie Wooster and then by Constance Novis as the character Cora Bellinger.

Danny Thomas performed the song at Arnold's as Howard Cunninghams father Cap Cunningham in the 1977 Happy Days fifth season episode "Grandpas Visit".

Ken Dodd performed the song as part of his ventriloquist's act with his puppet Dicky Mint during his performance on the LWT series An Audience With...

Singer Eddie Fisher was always called "Sonny Boy" by his family because of the popularity of this song, which was recorded the same year as Fisher's birth. In his autobiography, Fisher wrote that even after he was married to Elizabeth Taylor in 1959, earning $40,000 a week performing in Las Vegas, spending time with Frank Sinatra and Rocky Marciano, and had songs at the top of the charts, his family still called him "Sonny Boy".

The song was performed by one of the entrants at Talent Trek on Phoenix Nights.

The song "The Hand That Rocks the Cradle" by The Smiths from their self-titled debut album includes references to the song.

According to 1986 British TV documentary "The Real Al Jolson Story," "Sonny Boy" was written in a single sitting in a hotel room in Atlantic City as a joke. In the 1956 DeSylva, Brown, and Henderson biopic "The Best Things in Life Are Free", the songwriting trio are tired of being pestered by Al Jolson. They decide to write a song so unabashedly maudlin that even Jolson would hate it, and leave them alone. True to style, Jolson did not hate the overt sentimentality of the song and it became one of the biggest popular hits of the early 20th century.

Various renditions of the song are used as a leitmotif in the 1990 psychological horror film Jacob's Ladder, indicating protagonist Jacob's love for his late son Gabe. The film notably omits the last verse, which relates the narrator's loss in kind, perhaps as an artistic choice.

The song title is the title of a Dutch book and movie about a Surinamese/Dutch family and their lives leading up to and in the second World War. The little boy's nickname is Sonny Boy after this song, which was popular when he was born.

The song was referenced by the British band Black Midi in their song "John L" with the lyric "Three encores of 'Oh Sonny Boy' [sic] backed only by accordion". The reference is a nod to the blackface minstrelsy performed by Jolson, as the song's protagonist is a fascistic cult leader and espoused racist.

In series 2, episode 4 of the British TV series London's Burning, the song is sung by the character Bert "Sicknote" Quigley (Richard Walsh) to the recently baptised son of fellow firefighter Roland "Vaseline" Cartwright (Mark Arden).
