= Billy Martin =

American baseball player and manager (1928–1989)

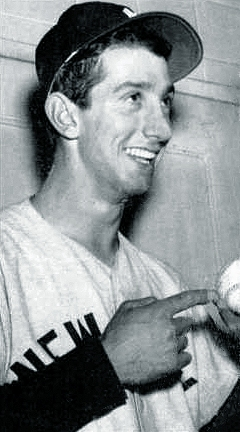
- Martin with the Yankees in 1954
- Second baseman / Manager
- Born: May 16, 1928; Berkeley, California, U.S.
- Died: December 25, 1989 (aged 61); Johnson City, New York, U.S.
- Batted: Right Threw: Right

MLB debut
- April 18, 1950, for the New York Yankees

Last MLB appearance
- October 1, 1961, for the Minnesota Twins

MLB statistics
- Batting average: .257
- Home runs: 64
- Runs batted in: 333
- Managerial record: 1,253–1,013
- Winning %: .553
- Stats at Baseball Reference
- Managerial record at Baseball Reference

Teams
- As player: New York Yankees (1950–1953, 1955–1957); Kansas City Athletics (1957); Detroit Tigers (1958); Cleveland Indians (1959); Cincinnati Reds (1960); Milwaukee Braves (1961); Minnesota Twins (1961); As manager: Minnesota Twins (1969); Detroit Tigers (1971–1973); Texas Rangers (1973–1975); New York Yankees (1975–1978, 1979); Oakland Athletics (1980–1982); New York Yankees (1983, 1985, 1988); As coach: Minnesota Twins (1965–1968)

Career highlights and awards
- All-Star (1956); 5× World Series champion (1951–1953, 1956, 1977); New York Yankees No. 1 retired; Monument Park honoree

Alfred Manuel "Billy" Martin (May 16, 1928 – December 25, 1989) was an American Major League Baseball (MLB) second baseman and manager, who, in addition to leading other teams, was five times the manager of the New York Yankees. First known as a scrappy infielder who made considerable contributions to the championship Yankee teams of the 1950s, he then built a reputation as a manager who would initially make bad teams good, before ultimately being fired amid dysfunction. In each of his stints with the Yankees he managed them to winning records before being fired by team owner George Steinbrenner or resigning under fire.

Martin was born in a working-class section of Berkeley, California. His skill as a baseball player gave him a route out of his home town. Signed by the Pacific Coast League Oakland Oaks, Martin learned much from Casey Stengel, the man who would manage him both in Oakland and in New York, with whom he enjoyed a close relationship. Martin's spectacular catch of a wind-blown Jackie Robinson popup late in Game Seven of the 1952 World Series saved that series for the Yankees, and he was the hitting star of the 1953 World Series, earning the Most Valuable Player award in the Yankee victory. He missed most of two seasons, 1954 and 1955, after being drafted into the Army, and his abilities never fully returned; the Yankees traded him after a brawl at the Copacabana club in New York during the 1957 season.

The last team for whom Martin played, the Minnesota Twins, gave him a job as a scout, and he spent most of the 1960s with them, becoming a coach in 1965. After a successful managerial debut with the Twins' top minor league affiliate, the Denver Bears, Martin was made the Twins' manager in 1969. He led the club to the American League West title, but was fired after the season. He then was hired by a declining Detroit Tigers franchise in 1971, and led that team to an American League East title in 1972 before being fired by the Tigers late in the 1973 season. He was quickly hired by the Texas Rangers, and he turned them for a season (1974) into a winning team, but was fired amid conflict with ownership in 1975. He was almost immediately hired by the Yankees.

As Yankee manager, Martin led the team to consecutive American League pennants in 1976 and 1977; the Yankees were swept in the 1976 World Series by the Cincinnati Reds but triumphed over the Los Angeles Dodgers in six games in the 1977 World Series. The 1977 season saw season-long conflict between Martin and Steinbrenner, as well as between the manager and Yankee slugger Reggie Jackson, including a near brawl between the two in the dugout on national television, but the season culminated in Martin's only world championship as a manager. He was forced to resign midway through the 1978 season after saying of Jackson and Steinbrenner, "one's a born liar, and the other's convicted"; less than a week later, the news that he would return as manager in a future season was announced to a huge ovation from the Yankee Stadium crowd. He returned in 1979, but was fired at season's end by Steinbrenner.

From 1980 to 1982, Martin managed the Oakland Athletics, earning a division title with an aggressive style of play known as "Billyball" that led them to the ALCS in 1981, but he was fired after the 1982 season. He was rehired by the Yankees, whom he managed three more times, each for a season or less, and each ending in his firing by Steinbrenner. Martin died in an automobile accident in upstate New York on Christmas night in 1989.

== Early life ==
Alfred Manuel Martin Jr. was born on May 16, 1928, in Berkeley, California. He was given his father's name; the elder Martin, usually nicknamed Al, was a truck driver for the city of Berkeley. Al Martin had been born in Kauai, Hawaii, the son of Portuguese immigrants, and had moved to Oakland. Billy Martin's mother's birth name was Juvan Salvini, but she went by the first name Jenny for most of her life. The daughter of Italian immigrants who had lived in San Francisco, but who moved across the Bay about the time of the 1906 earthquake, she also changed her last name, first when she married Donato Pisani around 1918, by whom she had a son, Frank, nicknamed Tudo, before the marriage broke up (Jenny later claimed that Donato had been unfaithful). There is some doubt that Jenny and Al ever married, but they lived together as a wedded couple for a time, during which Billy Martin was born at his maternal grandmother's house in West Berkeley.

Martin acquired the name "Billy" as a result of his grandmother, who never mastered English, saying bello ("beautiful") repeatedly over the baby, who learned his birth name only when a teacher used it at school. The Martin couple broke up soon after Billy was born, and each later accused the other of infidelity. Martin would have no further contact with his father until he was in his thirties, and the conflict between his parents likely left him with emotional wounds.

With Al Martin having returned to his native Hawaii Territory, Jenny no longer used his name, either in conversation (Note: To the end of her life, she called him "that jackass". See Pennington, p. 8.) or as part of hers, and before Billy's first birthday, she had met John "Jack" Downey, a laborer and jack-of-all-trades, whom she married in late 1929, and whose name she took for herself, but not for her sons. Billy Martin later called his stepfather a "great guy". Jenny always regretted that fame came to her son under the name Billy Martin, not Billy Downey.

Martin was an indifferent student and, from the age of about 12, he was often in trouble with teachers or the principal. His unusual home situation, his small size and large nose, and his residence in poverty-stricken West Berkeley caused other children to mock him, leading to conflict. Intensely competitive and thin-skinned, he quickly gained a reputation as a street fighter who would do almost anything to win.

Sports proved an outlet for Martin's competitiveness. He boxed at an amateur level, but it was baseball that proved to be his calling. His older brother Tudo, 10 years his senior, had grown up with Augie Galan, an outfielder for the Chicago Cubs from 1934 to 1941 who continued in the major leagues until his retirement in 1949. Galan, like other professional ballplayers, made James Kenney Park in Berkeley his off-season training ground, for there was a well-maintained baseball field there. Tudo was a good enough ballplayer that he was often invited to play, and Billy would follow along. As the boy got to play more and more as he grew, Galan took a special interest in tutoring Martin in the art of baseball.

When Martin reached Berkeley High School, which he attended from 1942 to 1946, he was dressed worse than many students from the more upscale housing east of San Pablo Avenue, but gained acceptance through sports, especially baseball, raising his batting average from a poor .210 as a sophomore to an outstanding .450 as a senior. He was an aggressive player, and was involved in fights both in and out of baseball uniform. One such on-field incident his senior year led to his dismissal from the team and concerned the professional baseball teams considering signing him. He was given a workout by the Brooklyn Dodgers, but was not offered a contract by the team.

The Oakland Oaks, a Pacific Coast League team, had been quietly scouting Martin for years, impressed with everything but his temper. Soon after Martin's high school graduation, Oaks trainer Red Adams persuaded the team's new manager, Casey Stengel, to give Martin a tryout. Stengel had seen Martin play in a high school all-star game, and though Martin did not play well, Stengel had told him that he had a future in baseball. Within weeks of the tryout, an infielder for the Oaks' Class D affiliate, the Idaho Falls Russets, was injured, and Stengel recommended that team owner Brick Laws sign Martin. Laws did so but first attempted, without success, to put a clause in the contract that would have nullified it if Martin misbehaved in a way similar to the fight that had ended his high school career.

== Playing career ==
=== Minor leagues ===
The 18-year-old Martin was unimpressive with Idaho Falls in 1946, hitting .254 while playing mostly third base, and racking up many throwing errors. He had a good spring training with the Oaks in 1947, but was sent to the Class C Phoenix Senators of the Arizona-Texas League. Martin felt he should have remained with the Oaks, and told Stengel so. The manager's response: "Prove me wrong".

Playing mostly day games in the arid Southwest in the era before widespread air conditioning, the Senators endured harsh playing and living conditions, as many of them boarded in a barracks beyond the right field fence. Nevertheless, Martin thrived there. Wearing the uniform number 1, a number he tried to secure with each team he played for, he hit .393, the highest average in organized baseball in 1947, drove in 173 runs, and was named the league's most valuable player. When the team's regular second baseman was injured in a fight with opposing catcher Clint Courtney — with whom Martin would lock horns himself — Martin was moved from third base, and would remain as a second baseman for most of the remainder of his playing career. Phoenix's season ended before that of the Oaks, and Martin was called up to the parent club. Though he did not play much, Martin won two games with doubles, and was an instant hit with the fans at Oaks Park.

When not playing, Martin closely shadowed Stengel, wanting to learn why the manager made the decisions he did. This impressed Stengel, who during his time as an outfielder for the New York Giants had sought to learn from their manager, John McGraw. Stengel and Martin grew closer in what has sometimes been described as a father-son relationship, as Stengel had no children, and Martin had been abandoned by his father. According to Martin biographer Peter Golenbock, "the two men, the punk kid and the old-time ballplayer, would develop a bond that would not be broken for a decade. Binding them was their deep love for the game of baseball."

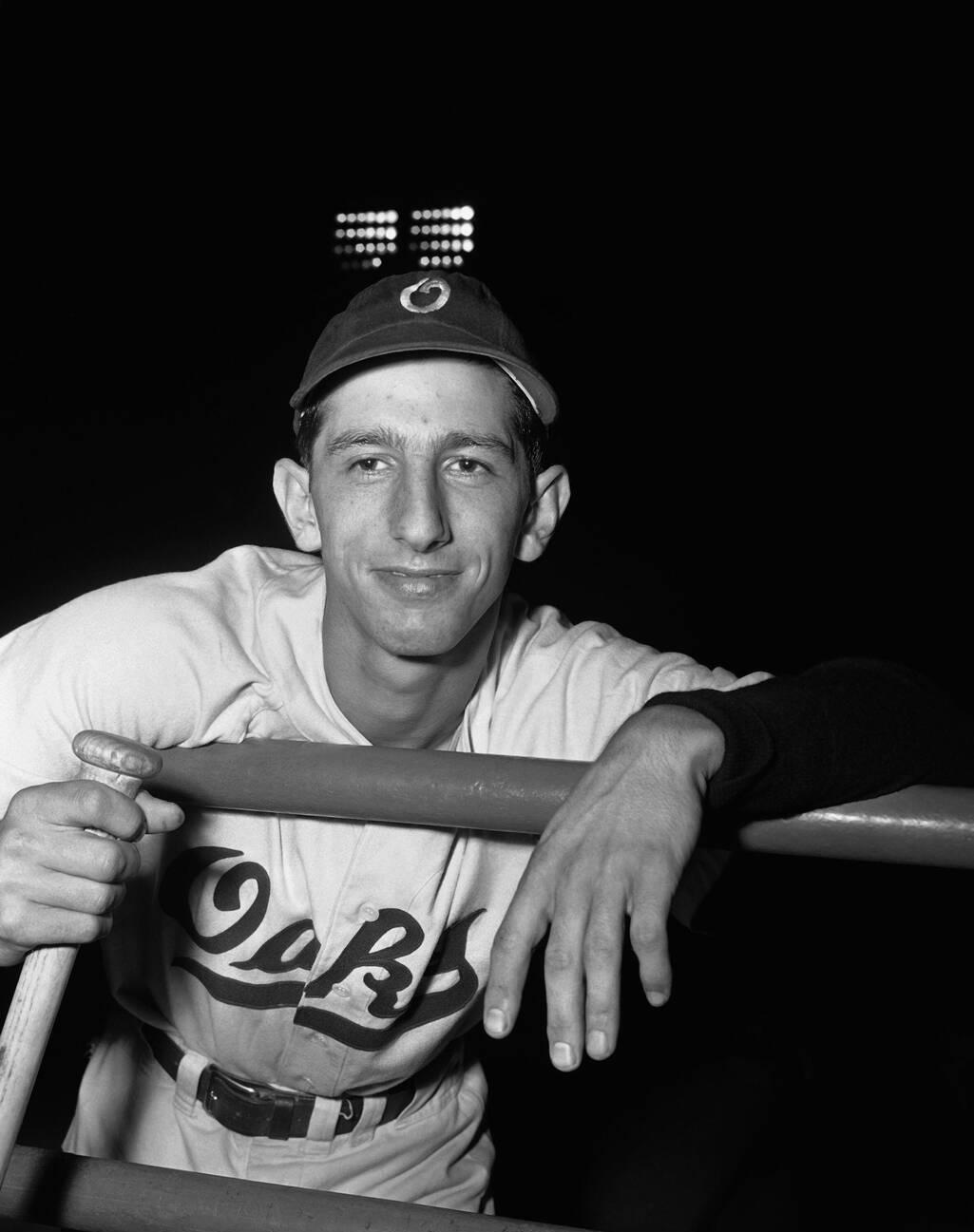
Martin with the Oakland Oaks in 1949

Martin made the Oaks' roster in 1948, but was slow to get regular playing time, as the Oaks had a former major-leaguer at each position and Stengel did not want to use Martin until the young ballplayer was ready. Instead, the manager had Martin sit on the bench next to him as he pointed out nuances of the game. Martin also learned about life on and off the field from his teammates.

Stengel assigned veteran players to work with Martin and be his roommate on road trips; at first Mel Duezabou, a student of the art of hitting with a lifetime minor league batting average over .300, who improved Martin at the plate. Later in the season, Duezabou was replaced with Cookie Lavagetto, a fellow infielder and former Dodgers star who was able to help Martin with fielding and advise him on what to expect in the major leagues. As injuries depleted the Oaks' regulars, Martin got increasing playing time, and finished the season with a .277 batting average, 3 home runs and 42 runs batted in. He became a team leader, active in brawls on the field and a loud and annoying bench jockey in an era when a player often had to contend with a stream of insults from the opposing team's dugout. The Oaks won the PCL pennant and the Governors' Cup playoffs. Martin's reward for the championship was a new car, bought by Laws, but to his distress, Stengel's reward was the manager's job with the New York Yankees, leaving Martin feeling abandoned. He was especially dispirited because his lifelong desire was to be a Yankee.

Stengel's replacement with the Oaks was Charlie Dressen. Highly knowledgeable about the game, Dressen was initially wary of Martin as a Stengel favorite, but was won over by the second baseman's hard work and desire to learn. Martin's education continued under Dressen, as he learned such things as the art of stealing signs, and learned to try to force the other team into game-deciding mistakes. Although the team did not play as well as it had in 1948, Martin improved his statistics, hitting .286 with 12 home runs and 92 runs batted in. At the same time, Stengel, who was managing the Yankees to the 1949 American League pennant and a World Series triumph, talked of Martin to the New York press, leading many to assume he would soon be a Yankee. On October 13, 1949, Martin and fellow Oak Jackie Jensen were acquired by the Yankees.

=== New York Yankees (1950–1953, 1955–1957) ===
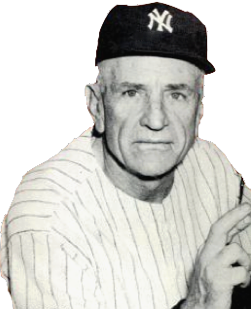
Casey Stengel in 1953

Press coverage of Martin's sale (Note: In addition to cash, the Yankees were to send Oakland a player to be named later, having received Martin and Jackie Jensen. On July 5, 1950, the Yankees sent Eddie Malone to the Oaks.) by the Oaks to the Yankees dismissed him as a "utility infielder", calling him "Alfred M. Martin", a name he detested. He was among those younger Yankees players, including Whitey Ford, Yogi Berra and Mickey Mantle, who reported in February 1950 to a pre-spring training instructional camp in Phoenix to work on fundamentals under Stengel's eye. Martin hoped to become the starting second baseman for the defending world champion Yankees, but the incumbent, Jerry Coleman, had just won the American League Rookie of the League award. On reporting to spring training in St. Petersburg, Florida, he stood out for his brashness if nothing else, taking care to correct the press on how to refer to him.

Confident of Stengel's protection, Martin sometimes defied Yankee coaches such as Frank Crosetti and Jim Turner, but won over most of his teammates as he showed his desire to learn and win, goals consistent with the "Yankee Way", that individual achievement was insignificant compared to team victory. Martin made his major league debut on April 18, 1950, Opening Day, for the Yankees as they visited the Boston Red Sox at Fenway Park, as a pinch hitter inserted in the eighth inning with the Yankees down, 9–4, with two men on base. Martin doubled off the Green Monster in left field to drive in the runners. The Yankees batted around and in his second at-bat of the inning, he singled with the bases loaded to drive in two more runs, the first time in major league history that a player got two hits in an inning in his debut game. Despite the feat, Martin was not made an everyday player, but sat next to Stengel in the dugout, listening and learning. When he did play, he quickly became a favorite of the Yankee Stadium crowd, and they would remain loyal to him for the rest of his life.

Despite his stellar start, Martin was little-used by the Yankees in 1950 and 1951, as Coleman remained the starting second baseman. Martin was sent to the minor leagues in May 1950 to give him everyday playing experience, a decision with which he vociferously disagreed, and so stated to Yankee general manager George Weiss, an outburst that Martin always believed poisoned the relationship between himself and the team front office. He was recalled after a month, but remained mostly on the bench, with only 39 plate appearances for the Yankees in 1950, batting .250. The Yankees won the pennant again, and swept the Philadelphia Phillies in the 1950 World Series, in which Martin did not play and Coleman was the Most Valuable Player. After the season, with the Korean War raging, the 22-year-old was drafted into the army, but gained a hardship discharge after two months, something that made him less of a hero in West Berkeley. He was discharged in late April, and rejoined the Yankees, but was used sparingly, Rookie of the Year Gil McDougald absorbing what playing time at second base was not used by Coleman. Martin, wearing uniform number 1 for the Yankees for the first time, (Note: He wore #12 as a rookie; #1 was then worn by the veteran Snuffy Stirnweiss. See Pennington, p. 66.) hit .259 in 51 games. Martin helped bring rookie outfielder Mickey Mantle out of his shell, introducing him to New York nightlife. In the 1951 World Series, which the Yankees won in six games over the Giants, Martin did not bat, but was inserted as a pinch runner in Game Two with the Yankees leading by a run after losing Game One. Martin scored a crucial insurance run in the Yankee victory, evading the tag from the catcher, Roy Noble, and after the game was singled out for praise by Giants manager Leo Durocher.

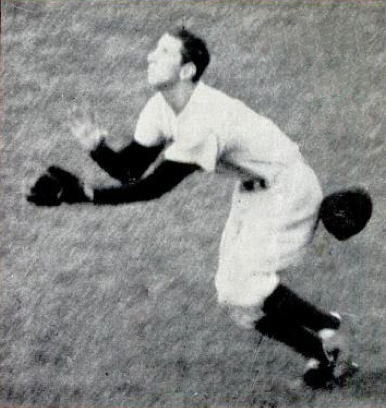
Martin's game-saving catch of Jackie Robinson's popup in Game 7 of the 1952 World Series

Coleman's induction into the armed forces before the 1952 season opened the way for Martin to be the regular Yankee second baseman. His debut as such was delayed when he broke his ankle demonstrating the technique of sliding into second base on a television show in March, and it was not until May 12 that he made his regular season debut. Once he did, he hit .267 in 109 games, his highest as an everyday player, becoming the "sparkplug" that Stengel had sought for his team, energizing it. When Stengel offered $100 to any player who let himself be hit by a pitch, Martin earned $300 for the game. In the 1952 World Series against the Dodgers, Martin got 5 hits in 23 at-bats, but that included a three-run home run to break open Game Two and tie the series. In Game Four, with the Dodgers leading the Series two games to one and threatening to tie the one-run game in the fifth inning, Charlie Dressen, who was coaching third base for the Dodgers, called for the squeeze play. Martin stole the sign and the runner was out when pitcher Allie Reynolds threw a pitchout, killing the rally. In Game Seven, with the Yankees up 4–2 in the seventh inning, two outs, and the bases loaded, Jackie Robinson hit a high, wind-blown pop fly. When first baseman Joe Collins appeared to lose the ball in the sun, Martin raced in from second base, catching the ball in fair ground near home plate only inches off the grass. All three runners would most likely have scored had the ball dropped, giving the Dodgers the lead going into the eighth inning; Martin biographer David Falkner called the catch "one of the great moments in World Series history".

As Yankees' regular second baseman in 1953, Martin saw his average drop to .257, but set what would be career highs with 149 games played (146 at second base), 15 home runs and 75 runs batted in. He was also ejected for the first two occasions in his career, once for arguing balls and strikes, the other for fighting. With Martin's growing reputation as a fighter, opposing players often slid into second base hard, hoping to injure him: Stengel stated, "Billy's being hit with the hardest blocks this side of a professional football field." Nevertheless, he finished second in the league in fielding percentage among second basemen. The Yankees won their fifth consecutive pennant, and in the 1953 World Series, Martin dominated, collecting 12 hits (tying a series record) with 23 total bases (breaking Babe Ruth's record of 19) as the Yankees beat the Dodgers in six games; Martin's hit in the ninth inning of Game Six scored the winning run. He was elected the Series' Most Valuable Player. Stengel exulted, "Look at him. He doesn't look like a great player—but he is a helluva player. Try to find something he can't do. You can't."

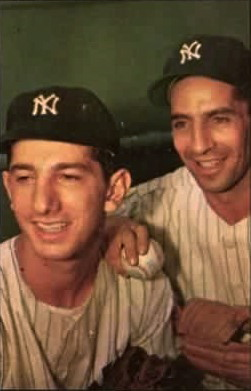
Martin (left) with Phil Rizzuto in the 1950s

There had been congressional investigations into whether athletes and others were given preferable treatment to avoid conscription and, in early 1954, Martin was drafted into the army, his renewed request for a hardship discharge denied. He complained to a reporter that he was given worse treatment than his fellow soldiers, allowed fewer weekend passes and not allowed to play on the Fort Ord baseball team. He missed the entire 1954 season, in which the Yankees, uniquely during Martin's career with them, did not win the pennant, and much of the 1955 season. He was transferred to Fort Carson in Colorado, where he was allowed to live off base. He played on and managed the baseball team, and rose to the rank of corporal. In August 1955, a furlough allowed him to return to the Yankees and, when they won the pennant, it was extended for the 1955 World Series. Although Martin batted .300 for the regular season, and .320 with four runs batted in during the Series, the Yankees lost to the Dodgers in seven games, and Martin berated himself for letting down Stengel. He was discharged from the army later in October, having been awarded the Good Conduct Medal.

During the 1956 season, Weiss began to hint to the media that Martin was a poor influence on his fellow players, especially on his roommate, Mantle, with whom he often caroused until the early hours of the morning. A dignified man, Weiss did not feel that Martin fit the image he wanted for the Yankees, and may have been offended by the player's outburst on being sent to the minors in 1950. By 1956, the Yankees were developing the next wave of infielders, including Bobby Richardson and Tony Kubek. Weiss would have liked to trade Martin, but was deterred by the fact that the second baseman was extremely popular with Yankee fans and with the press covering the team. Although Martin appeared in the 1956 All-Star Game—his only All-Star appearance as a player—his abilities as a player never fully returned after leaving the army. With Richardson progressing rapidly through the Yankee farm system, Martin worried that his days with the team were numbered. Nevertheless, he hit .264 with nine home runs for the Yankees in 1956, and in the 1956 World Series against the Dodgers, Martin played well both in the field and at the plate, getting the hit that gave the Yankees the lead for good in Game Four to tie the Series, and hitting .296 with two home runs as the Yankees won in seven games, thus finishing his World Series career as a player with a .333 batting average.

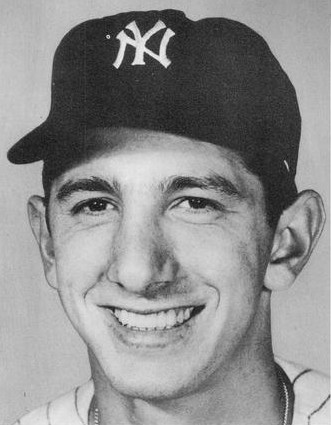
Martin in 1957

Weiss warned Martin before the 1957 season to avoid trouble, and the infielder did nothing to aid his own cause by injuring both himself and Mantle (the reigning MVP) in an intentional collision between their golf carts as they played a round on a Florida course during spring training. While Martin recovered from this and other injuries, Bobby Richardson played, showing a fielding range that Martin no longer possessed. But the incident that gave Weiss the leeway to trade Martin was a brawl at the Copacabana nightclub in New York on May 16. Although it was fellow Yankee Hank Bauer who was accused of throwing the first punch, Martin believed that Weiss would blame him, and as the trade deadline of June 15 approached, his foreboding and tension grew. Stories differ about how Martin learned he had been traded to the Kansas City A's on the trade deadline: biographer David Falkner stated that Martin, out of the lineup in the game at Kansas City's Municipal Stadium, was informed by farm director Lee MacPhail, and that Stengel refused to see Martin, but Martin in his autobiography alleged that he had been sitting in the bullpen and that Stengel came to inform him. Marty Appel, in his biography of Stengel, stated that Martin was called in to see Stengel, was told of the trade, and Martin blamed the manager for not preventing it. According to Appel, "No one had worn the Yankees uniform more proudly than Billy; it was like a fraternity jacket to him. An eighteen-year exile was beginning for him, and his sadness, bitterness, melancholy, resentment, and hurt never really faded. His career as a journeyman infielder—playing with six teams, none more than a year, and never to see the World Series again—had begun." Among the consequences of the trade was the loss of the relationship with Stengel, with whom he rarely spoke in the years that followed.

=== Later career (1957–1961) ===
Martin switched dugouts - the Yankees were playing a series in Kansas City - after the trade to the A's, and in his first game got two hits, including a home run off the Yankees' Johnny Kucks. Then the Yankees left town, without Martin, who now faced playing for a seventh-place team with little hope of doing better. He hit .360 in his first ten games, but the A's lost nine of them. Although Martin hit .257 with Kansas City, an improvement over the .241 he was hitting with the Yankees, the A's lost 94 games, finishing 38 1/2 games behind the Yankees. At the end of the season, Martin was traded to the Detroit Tigers in a 13-player deal, and he stated angrily, "They just can't throw us [players] around from one club to another without us having a say-so."

Detroit manager Jack Tighe called Martin "the key to our future"; he was expected to electrify the team as he had the Yankees. Without talent on the field and Stengel in the dugout to back him up, Martin was unable to do that, as after a decent start, the Tigers settled down to a losing season, and the players became annoyed at Martin's ways. The Tigers had him play shortstop, but he lacked the range and the throwing arm needed to be effective, and made 20 errors for the season. He hit .255 with seven home runs, but the Tigers finished fifth, 15 games behind the Yankees. After the season, Martin and Al Cicotte were traded to Cleveland in exchange for Don Mossi, Ray Narleski and Ossie Álvarez.

With Martin at second base, the Indians finished second in 1959, five games behind the Chicago White Sox and ahead of the third-place Yankees. Despite the relatively good finish, Martin was embittered, contending that if manager Joe Gordon had used him properly, the Indians would have won the pennant. In August, Martin, who did not wear a batting helmet, was hit on the head by a pitch from Tex Clevenger of the Washington Senators, breaking a cheekbone and giving him an unconscious fear of being hit again, diminishing his effectiveness at the plate. He was traded, after the season, to the Cincinnati Reds; manager Fred Hutchinson hoped Martin could instill some fight into his team. Although he could not make the Reds a winner with his diminished skills, he still was a battler on the field, notoriously fighting pitcher Jim Brewer of the Chicago Cubs on August 4, 1960. In the aftermath of his beaning by Clevenger, teams pitched Martin inside, as did Brewer. After one such pitch, Martin, on the next, swung and let his bat go, though it landed far from the pitching mound. When he went out to retrieve it, Brewer approached, Martin swung at him, and sometime during the brawl, a punch broke Brewer's orbital bone, though whether it was Martin who did it or Reds pitcher Cal McLish is uncertain. Martin was ejected (his sixth and final ejection as a player), and was suspended for five games and fined by National League president Warren Giles. With Brewer out for the season, the Cubs sued Martin. Litigation dragged on for a decade and the case was eventually settled in 1969 for $10,000 plus $12,000 attorney's fees. Martin, who in the press defended his actions as justified given pitchers threw inside to him, asked, "Do they want a check or cash?"

Although Martin played 103 games for the Reds in 1960, batting .246, he had only three home runs and 16 runs batted in, and following the season was sold to the Milwaukee Braves. His old manager with the Oaks, Dressen, led the Braves, but even he could not find a starting position for Martin. He had only six at-bats for the Braves, with no hits, and on June 1, 1961, was traded to the Minnesota Twins for Billy Consolo. Martin, given the starting second baseman position, started well and finished well for the Twins, but in between had a prolonged batting slump. Between the Braves and Twins, he batted .242 for 1961, his lowest full-season average. He reported for spring training in 1962, but was soon approached by manager Sam Mele, a longtime friend, and told that he had been released by the team. No longer able to compete on the field, Martin's playing career was over at the age of 33.

== Scout, coach and minor league manager (1962–1968) ==
Martin accepted an offer by Twins owner Calvin Griffith to be a scout for the team. He also took a job with Grain Belt Brewery in public relations. The combination worked well; Martin proved himself a competent evaluator of talent, while selling the Twins in bars across Minnesota. He urged the Twins to sign pitching prospect Jim Palmer, but Griffith was unwilling to pay the $50,000 signing bonus Palmer requested, and the pitcher went on to a Hall of Fame career with the Baltimore Orioles. With his survival in baseball on the line, Martin kept his nose clean, his drinking moderate, and his fists unclenched.

With manager Mele's consent, Griffith made Martin third base coach before the 1965 season, leading to immediate media speculation that when the Twins hit a rough patch, Martin would be appointed as manager. Mele later denied having any feeling that Martin was after his job, and the Twins experienced few losing streaks in 1965, winning the American League pennant. Martin worked with the players to make them more aggressive on the base paths. He recognized the talent of the young Rod Carew, and spent much time working with him to make him a better ballplayer. The Twins had tried to trade shortstop Zoilo Versalles the previous winter; Martin worked on his hitting and base running and Versalles was voted the league's Most Valuable Player. Although the Twins lost the 1965 World Series to the Los Angeles Dodgers in seven games, Martin was given much of the credit for getting them there.

In 1966, Martin damaged his chances of promotion to the managerial job by getting into a fight with Twins traveling secretary Howard Fox. The Twins and Yankees shared a charter flight, and the players got rowdy. Martin refused Fox's request that he intercede with his former teammates, including Mantle and Ford, to get them to quiet down. When the Twins reached their hotel, Fox was slow to give Martin his room key, violating baseball's usual etiquette that the manager and coaches got theirs first. When Martin demanded it, Fox threw it at him, and after words were exchanged, Martin hit him in the face. Martin was fined by Griffith, a friend of Fox's. When Mele was fired in 1967, his replacement was not Martin, as had been widely speculated, but Cal Ermer.

The Twins started the 1968 season poorly and Martin was called into Griffith's office, expecting to be offered Ermer's job. Instead, the owner wanted to make Martin the manager of the Denver Bears, the Twins' top affiliate, at that time with an 8–22 record. Martin was reluctant to accept, but did when his wife Gretchen told him that he needed to prove his ability as a manager before getting a job as one in the major leagues. The Bears started well under .500, but by the end of the season had a winning record. Martin had stressed to the team that they were a single unit, with him as boss. He instituted the aggressive base running he had used in Minnesota, and focused on fundamentals. When the team lost, he told them (and anyone else within earshot) exactly why they had lost; third baseman Graig Nettles, who would play again for Martin as a major leaguer, stated Martin made the players afraid to lose. He defended them before the outside world, confronting umpires—he was ejected from games eight times. The team was 65–50 under Martin, and by season's end there was widespread speculation that Martin would be a major league manager in 1969. Despite the two AL expansion teams, the Seattle Pilots and Kansas City Royals, having vacancies, and expressing interest in hiring Martin, he stated that his loyalty was to the Twins, who had had another disappointing season. On October 11, 1968, the Twins gave Martin a one-year contract as manager. Said Griffith, "I feel like I'm sitting on a keg of dynamite."

== Managerial career ==
=== Minnesota Twins (1969) ===
As Twins manager, Martin continued the aggressive baseball he had urged on the team as third-base coach. The team lost the first four games of the season, on the road, but came home to the largest Opening Day crowd since the franchise moved to Minnesota. Winning streaks of 5 and 8 games in April established the team in first place in the new American League West and kept the fans coming to Metropolitan Stadium. Martin set a tone of willingness to do anything to win. When Oakland A's slugger Reggie Jackson hit home runs in his first two at bats against the Twins, Minnesota pitcher Dick Woodson threw a pitch behind Jackson's head. After a second pitch closer to Jackson's head than to the plate, the slugger charged the mound, provoking a full-scale brawl, for which Jackson later blamed Martin, who he said had ordered the pitches.

Despite the winning baseball, owner Griffith was less than enamored with Martin's conduct. Griffith wanted Martin to meet regularly with him to discuss the team; Martin repeatedly showed up during the time set aside for Griffith's daily nap. When pitcher Dave Boswell and outfielder Bob Allison got into a fight outside the Lindell A. C. sports bar in August, Martin joined the battle, repeatedly punching Boswell, who won 20 games that year. Martin claimed that Boswell had come at him first, which Boswell denied. Although it was Boswell who was fined by the team, Griffith considered firing Martin, but decided that the victories on the field justified keeping him. The Twins won the Western Division by 9 games over Oakland, with Boswell winning 8 games down the stretch.

The Twins played the Orioles, who had won 109 games during the regular season (the Twins had won 97) and who were managed by Earl Weaver in the 1969 American League Championship Series (ALCS). Baltimore won the first two games of the best-of-five series at home, with both games going extra innings. At home for Game Three, Martin was expected to start star pitcher Jim Kaat but instead chose Bob Miller, who was knocked out of the box in the second inning, and the Twins were eliminated.

Martin had been given a one-year contract for 1969; he asked for a two-year deal for 1970 and 1971. Griffith was unhappy both that Martin had not pitched Kaat (a friend of his) and that the explanation he had asked Martin for had been "Because I'm the manager". Martin's decision was defensible, as Kaat had been struggling with injuries, and Miller had won during the pennant race. Other events during the season, such as the fight with Boswell and Martin kicking former US vice president Hubert Humphrey out of the locker room when he tried to visit after a Twins loss also embarrassed the team. Twins executives had also received numerous complaints about Martin drinking heavily during road trips, and were angered when Griffith told Minneapolis Tribune columnist Sid Hartman off the record that the Twins were thinking of firing him. Although Martin had led the team to a division title, Fox and other Twins executives felt Martin was more trouble than he was worth and urged his dismissal. Griffith fired him on October 13, 1969. There was outrage among Twins fans, and attendance, which had been boosted by Martin's presence. The 1970 team proceeded to win 98 games that year under Bill Rigney as manager. The Twins won their second straight division title but again lost the ALCS to Baltimore in three games, this time with Kaat pitching—and losing—Game Three.

=== Detroit Tigers (1971–1973) ===
Martin spent the 1970 season out of baseball for the first time since 1946, but stayed in the Twin Cities as an interviewer for Minneapolis station KDWB. He received nibbles of interest, including from A's owner Charlie Finley, and each later blamed the other for the failure to come to terms. The Detroit Tigers had won the World Series in 1968, but dropped below .500 two years later. Team general manager Jim Campbell felt that the team could win again with the right manager. On October 2, 1970, Campbell fired manager Mayo Smith and gave Martin a two-year deal (for 1971 and 1972) at an annual salary of $65,000. Martin seemed to be an odd fit for the Tigers, given their straitlaced reputation under Campbell, but the general manager felt that Martin was the spark the Tigers needed to return to contention.

Martin announced that the Tigers would win the 1971 American League East title, and that the Orioles were over the hill. He made it clear that he was going to run the team his way, and his clubhouse tirades for poor play even during spring training were reported in the media and concerned Detroit management. He had a well-publicized feud with slugger Willie Horton, whom Martin repeatedly benched and who kept himself out of the lineup with an alleged injury that Martin disputed. There were repeated conflicts with umpires, and with personnel off the field: he accused the organist in Oakland of trying to distract his players, and the scoreboard operators in Baltimore of spying on his team. After a poor April, Martin's players won seven in a row to surge to within 4 1/2 games of the top-placing Red Sox near the start of June. The results helped establish Martin as one of the best managers in baseball, at least on the field. His generalship could not paper over the flaws in the ball club, and the Tigers finished second, 11 games behind the Orioles. Nevertheless, Martin led the Tigers to a 91–71 record, a 12-game improvement from 1970, proving to many people that his success in Minnesota had not been a fluke.

Martin was rewarded with a new two-year contract, through 1973, with an increase in salary. At spring training, Martin was relaxed and confident, his Tigers a favorite to win the American League East. The season started late, due to a player's strike, and the missed games were not made up, which left the teams playing an unequal number of games. Once play started, Martin was his usual self, berating opposing managers and the umpires from the dugout, and being ejected for it in the second game of the season, against Baltimore and Weaver. This was his first ejection as Tigers manager. There was a close AL East pennant race in 1972, when the Tigers and Orioles were joined by the Yankees and Red Sox in contending for the division title. With Detroit winning, those players hostile to Martin remained silent. The season came down to a three-game set between the Tigers and Red Sox, with Boston a half game ahead. The Tigers won the first two, though they lost the meaningless third game, making them the AL East champs by a half game.

In the 1972 American League Championship Series, the Tigers faced the Oakland A's. The Tigers lost Game One in extra innings. With the A's up 5–0 in Game Two, Tigers pitcher Lerrin LaGrow hit the speedy A's shortstop, Bert Campaneris, in the legs. Before a national television audience, Campaneris threw his bat towards the mound, and a brawl ensued. Many believed Martin had ordered Campaneris hit. The Tigers recovered from the 2–0 deficit by winning Games Three and Four at Tiger Stadium, but lost Game Five and the series. Martin was praised for taking the Tigers as far as he did, but his lineup choices for Game Five were questioned—playing catcher Bill Freehan with a broken thumb, while a healthy catcher, Duke Sims, played left field instead of Horton. Both of Martin's choices were involved in plays that resulted in A's runs, which a better-fielding player might have prevented. Nevertheless, Martin again received a revised two-year contract, through the 1974 season.

The 1973 season was not as successful for Martin and the Tigers. Nevertheless, Martin did have some successes, making John Hiller a successful closer after the pitcher had survived a heart attack, and discovering Ron LeFlore in a Michigan prison; LeFlore would go on to a successful major league career. Martin wanted Campbell to trade some aging veterans to renew the squad, but Campbell refused. Martin briefly quit during spring training when Campbell did not uphold a fine he had imposed on Horton. Factional conflict within the team, muted by the team's 1972 success, resurged as the team fell behind in the standings after spending much of the summer in a spirited three-way race with the Orioles and Yankees. Martin angered Campbell, owner John Fetzer, and other Tigers executives by criticizing the front office in the media. Campbell had defended Martin in the past when Fetzer expressed concern about Martin's off-field behavior, but became increasingly less willing to do so. In May of 1973, the Tigers were trailing the lowly Milwaukee Brewers in the standings, and when a sportswriter asked Martin if he thought the Brewers were legitimate contenders, Martin hotly replied, "If [the Brewers] can win with that club, then I'm a Chinese aviator." This comment irked Brewers fans, and when the Tigers next visited Milwaukee, Brewers fans displayed signs responding to Martin's comments, such as "Fly the Friendly Skies of China with Billy Martin", while Milwaukee County Stadium's organist would play the theme to Chinatown whenever Martin walked out to the pitching mound, as the crowd booed him. In August, when the Tigers returned to Milwaukee, the Brewers hosted a "Chinese Aviator Night", with fans dressing up and Martin serving as a judge in a "Chinese Aviator look-alike" contest. Despite being in first place in June, the Brewers ended up with a losing record.

On August 30, frustrated that umpires were not calling Indians pitcher Gaylord Perry for spitballs, Martin ordered his pitchers to do the same, and told the media what he had done after the game. He was suspended by AL president Joe Cronin for breaching league rules. This was the last straw for Campbell, who fired Martin before the suspension ran out.

=== Texas Rangers (1973–1975) ===
During my baseball travels, I never met a man who didn't know Billy Martin. Billy must have been on a first-name basis with probably 10,000 notable Americans. Sen. Eugene McCarthy, the presidential peace candidate who had become chums with Billy when he managed the Twins, came to [1975 Rangers spring training in] Pompano Beach and stayed a week. So too did entire squadrons of automobile dealers, tavern owners ... (Note: Ellipsis in original) backslappers and hucksters and hustlers, all wanting to say hello to the Little Dago. A district judge from New Orleans who had known Martin from God could only guess where arrived at Billy's springtime cavalcade of thrills, claiming that he was in town "looking for a little keister for Easter".

— Mike Shropshire, Seasons in Hell: With Billy Martin, Whitey Herzog, and the Worst Baseball Team in History, the 1973–1975 Texas Rangers (2014 edition), Kindle locations 2823–2827

Texas Rangers owner Bob Short was a person Martin knew and trusted from the time in the 1960s when Short was an executive with the Twins. After Martin was dismissed by the Tigers, Short told his manager, Whitey Herzog, that he would fire his own grandmother to have a chance to hire Martin. Short, days later, fired Herzog and hired Martin, provoking Herzog's comment, "I'm fired, I'm the grandmother."

Martin faced a serious challenge in trying to rebuild a team that was 47–81 and would lose 105 games that season. No pitcher on the staff won more than nine games that year, and the team had the worst fan attendance in baseball. But Martin felt Short understood him, and he was given a five-year contract that not only made him field manager, but gave him the powers of general manager as well. He would have complete authority over the 25-man roster, and would also be responsible for the farm system. Martin faced a receptive clubhouse; most of the players had grown up watching him as a Yankee on television.

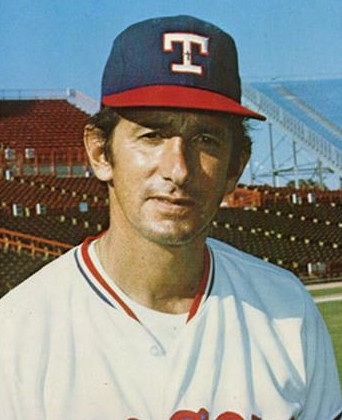
Martin in 1974

Over the winter of 1973–1974, Martin made several trades, bringing Ferguson Jenkins from the Cubs in exchange for Bill Madlock. Jenkins and Jim Bibby would anchor the pitching staff. He promoted Jim Sundberg and Mike Hargrove to the Rangers from the lower minor leagues. Short sold the team to Brad Corbett just before the 1974 season began; the new owner retained Martin as manager, but did not allow him control of the roster.

The Rangers opened at Arlington Stadium against the two-time defending world champion A's: Martin billed the series as the meeting of the top two AL West teams though Las Vegas put the Rangers at 50–1 to win the division. The A's won two of three, but all the games were close. After winning a series at Oakland at the end of April marked by aggressive baserunning, the Rangers were in first place. Martin taught the Rangers to improve their play and to beware his rage; outfielder Tom Grieve later stated that he made the team afraid to lose.

The Rangers stayed close to the division lead through May and June, though they dropped to fourth place and eight games back at the All-Star break. The Rangers kept the race close until late September, and finished second, five games back, their record of 84–76 a considerable improvement on 1973. Martin was named AL Manager of the Year, and home attendance more than doubled. Wielding a fungo bat, he led his team onto the field to defend other players during the Ten Cent Beer Night riot.

On the night that the firing [from the Rangers] was announced Billy sat with a group of sportswriters in his office and, I'm told, wept ... There is a term that describes Billy's emotional state at that point. Crocodile tears, I believe they call it. The next time I laid eyes on Billy Martin was in the Pontchartrain Hotel in Detroit. Billy was on television, appearing on the game of the week. He was wearing his proud number 1 on the back of a uniform that had pinstripes ... The new field manager of the New York Yankees looked real happy. Like I said, say what you want about Billy Martin, he was smart.

— Mike Shropshire, Seasons in Hell: With Billy Martin, Whitey Herzog, and the Worst Baseball Team in History, the 1973–1975 Texas Rangers (2014 edition), Kindle locations 3134–3138

Given their strong performance in 1974 and Martin's reputation for building winners, the Rangers were the favorite in the AL West for 1975 over the three-time defending world champion A's. The team underperformed, however, Jenkins going from 25 wins to 17 and other key players not doing as well as in 1974. After a slow start, the Rangers recovered to some extent, but near the end of June found themselves 12 games behind the A's. Relations between Martin and the Ranger front office were strained by off-field issues, including Martin's drinking and conflict with some of the players, including Sundberg. As he lost control of his team, Martin struck Rangers traveling secretary Burton Hawkins, allegedly for organizing a players' wives' club. In July, after a dispute with Corbett over whether to sign free agent catcher Tom Egan, Martin told the media that the owner, who had made a fortune selling plumbing pipes, "knows as much about baseball as I do about pipe". Corbett began consulting the minority owners to decide whether to fire Martin, and informed the manager of this. One day later, on July 20, after Martin ordered the public address announcer to play "Thank God I'm a Country Boy" during the seventh inning stretch instead of "Take Me Out to the Ball Game" (as Corbett had instructed), he was fired.

=== New York Yankees (1975–1978, 1979) ===
==== 1975 and 1976 ====
Martin was not out of work for very long. Two weeks after Texas fired Martin, manager Bill Virdon was fired by the Yankees. The former Yankee second baseman was hired to take his place, marking Martin's first time in a Yankee uniform since the 1957 trade. Some players and writers have concluded that he had long campaigned for the Yankee job. What is beyond dispute is that after Martin was dismissed by Texas, New York general manager Gabe Paul, acting on behalf of owner George Steinbrenner, quickly got in touch with Martin. An agreement soon followed, and Martin officially returned to the Bronx on August 1. Well aware of Martin's behavioral proclivities, Paul and Steinbrenner believed they could keep Martin under control. They not only wrote good-conduct clauses into Martin's contract, but picked the coaching staff themselves.

The only job. The Yankee job. This is the only job I ever wanted.

— Billy Martin on being hired by the New York Yankees, 1975.

With little chance of catching the first-place Red Sox, Martin spent the remainder of the 1975 season evaluating his team, cultivating the press and getting ready for 1976. At that time, Paul was operating head of the franchise; Steinbrenner had been suspended from baseball by Commissioner Bowie Kuhn following his conviction for making illegal contributions to Richard Nixon's 1972 re-election campaign, but continued to make decisions (such as Martin's hiring) behind the scenes. With Martin at the helm, the Yankees went 30–26 in their final 56 games of the 1975 season; they ended the season in third place, where they had been when he took over.

Martin worked with Paul during the offseason to dispose of players such as Bobby Bonds and Doc Medich, obtaining in return Mickey Rivers, Willie Randolph and others. The 1976 Yankee season was probably his most trouble-free as a major league manager. Martin endeared himself to his players quickly by effectively winning a game in Milwaukee. He pointed out that the first-base umpire had, almost unnoticed, called time out just before an apparent game-winning grand slam by Don Money. The Yankees held on to win that game and quickly moved into first place. Steinbrenner had returned to the helm of the Yankees when Kuhn shortened his suspension during spring training, but did not interfere with Martin's managing, content to sit back and watch as the Yankees continued to win.

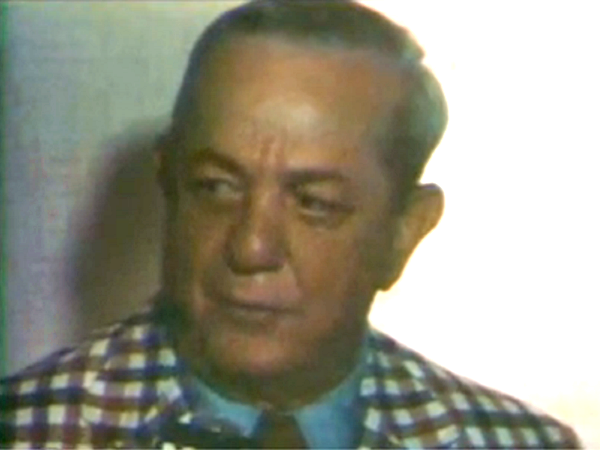
Gabe Paul

The Yankees won the AL East by 11 games over Baltimore, securing their first postseason appearance since 1964. In the 1976 American League Championship Series, they played Kansas City. Aggressive baserunning, plus bench jockeying that may have caused Royals third baseman George Brett to make two crucial errors, helped New York win Game One, but Kansas City won two of the next three. Martin's choice of Ed Figueroa to pitch the decisive Game Five at Yankee Stadium was controversial as Figueroa had not pitched well late in the season and had lost Game Two, but he was in good form and helped the Yankees to a 6–3 lead in the eighth inning—when Brett tied the game with a three-run home run. Martin did not let the home run faze him, and had a verbal exchange with the next batter, John Mayberry, which helped wake the Yankees up from their stunned disbelief at Brett's home run. Yankee first baseman Chris Chambliss drove the first pitch of the bottom of the ninth over the right field wall, garnering the Yankees their first pennant since 1964, and Martin his first as a manager. The Yankees faced the defending world champion Reds in the 1976 World Series, and lost in four straight games. Martin was ejected from Game Four, at Yankee Stadium, after rolling a baseball towards umpire Bruce Froemming, the only Yankee to ever be kicked out of a World Series game.

==== 1977 championship season ====
In the offseason, Steinbrenner sought to sign free agent outfielder Reggie Jackson, convinced that he would add punch to the middle of the Yankee lineup. Steinbrenner wooed the slugger, taking him to lunch at the 21 Club and walking with him on Manhattan's sidewalks as fans called out to Jackson, urging him to become a Yankee. Though New York did not make the highest offer, Jackson signed with the team. Sources record Martin's views on Jackson's signing differently: Pennington stated that Martin was not opposed and told Steinbrenner he could use a right fielder, whereas Golenbock deemed Martin "certainly didn't want Reggie", feeling that Jackson was too much of a prima donna, who might rebel against the manager's authority, and be "tougher to handle than a bull at a rodeo". Falkner wrote that while Martin did not see Jackson as filling the team's needs, he was not opposed. Both Martin and Paul stated that once Bobby Grich was signed by the California Angels, Martin supported signing Jackson. Nevertheless, Martin was embittered by Steinbrenner taking Jackson to famous restaurants when he had not invited Martin to lunch, even though the manager was spending the offseason in nearby New Jersey.

When the Yankees lost six of the first eight games of the 1977 season, Steinbrenner called separate meetings with the players, the manager and the press, and told Martin that he had better get the team to turn things around or he could expect to be fired. Steinbrenner told the press what he had told Martin. In May, Jackson alienated most of his teammates by saying in an interview that he, rather than the respected team captain, Thurman Munson, was "the straw that stirs the drink" on the team. Martin was drinking heavily, and had briefly quit his job in spring training following an argument with Steinbrenner, who was, according to Falkner, "the owner whose idea of 'hands-on' was a stranglehold". Jackson's ties to Steinbrenner, who had given him his contract, made Martin powerless to discipline the slugger. Golenbock noted,

For the rest of the season Billy Martin would have to spend the majority of his time worrying about the egos of George Steinbrenner and Reggie Jackson rather than concentrating on managing his team. His biggest headache would be George's pet player. Billy knew what he had to do to control Reggie Jackson, but he was impotent to do it as long as George Steinbrenner protected Jackson.

The question of whether the strife between Martin and Jackson involved a racial element has divided Yankee players and those who have written about the 1977 team. In his 2013 autobiography, Jackson stated that there was, and that Martin and some white Yankees would tell racist jokes. Among black Yankees who were there when Martin was, Elliott Maddox agreed with Jackson but others, such as Chambliss, denied there was racism. Numerous black players, though, were extremely close with Martin, including Rickey Henderson, Randolph, Carew, and others. Interviewed on a Martin biography after Martin's death, Henderson broke down in tears. Martin had also given a chance to Ron LeFlore coming out of prison when no one else would.

BILLY, JAX CLASH IN DUGOUT

— Daily News back page headline, June 19, 1977 (p. 120)

Tensions between Martin and Jackson exploded on national television on June 18 at Fenway Park, the NBC Saturday afternoon Game of the Week, with the Yankees a half game behind the Red Sox. Martin pulled Jackson off the field mid-inning (replacing him with Paul Blair) for failing to hustle on a shallow outfield fly ball by Jim Rice, allowing Rice to reach second base. The enraged Martin had to be restrained by coaches Elston Howard and Yogi Berra from getting into a fight with Jackson in the dugout, scenes shown across the nation by NBC. Steinbrenner was convinced that he should fire Martin, but negotiations brokered by backup catcher Fran Healy secured a truce. Nevertheless, the rumors that Martin would be fired, some originated by Steinbrenner, would continue season-long. All of this went on in the full glare of New York's newspapers and, with the public firmly on Martin's side, Steinbrenner stayed his hand. According to Appel in his history of the Yankees, "the team was winning, the turnstiles were clicking, and the Yanks were dominating the sports pages".

By August 7, there was renewed conflict on the team, including between Martin and Jackson, and the Yankees had fallen five games behind the Red Sox. Martin had pledged to bat Jackson cleanup, as Jackson wanted, but had rarely done so, preferring Chambliss with his higher batting average. Healy and Munson interceded with Martin, and when Martin batted Jackson fourth on August 10, both Jackson and the team responded by going on hot streaks. Despite a season of turmoil, the Yankees won 40 of their last 50 games to take the division by 2 1/2 games over both Boston and Baltimore. Appel noted, "The '77 Yanks won 100 games and the division title, but Billy Martin looked much more like a man who had taken each of the 62 defeats as a sock in the face. Hidden behind dark glasses, losing weight, drinking excessively, he had been through hell and back."

The Yankees played the Royals again in the 1977 American League Championship Series. The teams split the first two games at Yankee Stadium, and the Royals won Game Three in Kansas City. Needing to win two straight on the road to win the pennant, the Yankees won Game Four, and Martin benched Jackson from the starting lineup in Game Five, feeling that he did not hit Royals pitcher Paul Splittorff well. In the eighth inning, with the Yankees losing 3–1, Martin put Jackson in as a pinch hitter and Jackson singled off reliever Doug Bird to drive in a run. The Yankees scored three runs in the ninth to win their second straight pennant, 5–3.

The 1977 World Series was against the Los Angeles Dodgers. In Game One in New York, the Yankees won 4–3 in 12 innings on a single by Blair, who had replaced Jackson late in the game for defensive reasons. The Yankees lost Game Two, and on the off day before Game Three at Dodger Stadium, there was more conflict in the press between Martin and Jackson. A conference in Gabe Paul's hotel room smoothed matters over, and the Yankees won Games Three and Four, but lost Game Five to send the series back to New York. Prior to Game Six, the Yankees announced that Martin was being given a bonus and an extended contract, relieving some of the intense pressure on him—the media had reported that he would be fired if the Yankees lost the World Series. Jackson, who had been mockingly dubbed Mr. October by Munson during the conflict before Game Three, made the name his own by hitting three home runs off three Dodger pitchers on consecutive pitches, and the Yankees won 8–4, before a jubilant crowd which invaded the field after the final pitch. Jackson and Martin were interviewed for television with arms around each other. Golenbeck noted that Martin "had fought the other teams in the league, fought his star player, and fought his owner, who respected no man". According to Appel, "it would be the only world championship of Martin's managing career, and it was a painful one".

==== 1978 and first departure ====
The events of 1977 placed Martin among the most prominent New York celebrities, a status he would keep until his death, as headline writers would refer to "Billy" without fear of readers misunderstanding who was meant. He was seen in the city's nightlife, often with different young women, at a time when his second marriage was disintegrating after years of turmoil. He also garnered numerous endorsement deals, but cashed the checks rather than pay taxes on them. As a result, he would be under constant scrutiny from the Internal Revenue Service for the last decade of his life. Paul left to run the Indians after the 1977 season and was replaced by Al Rosen. Paul's departure removed one of the buffers between Martin and Steinbrenner; Martin blamed the owner for constant interference during the season.

There was no relief from conflict when the 1978 season began, with Mickey Rivers benched after appearing to loaf after a fly ball, and an alcohol-fueled altercation between team members on an airplane that helped put an end to the Yankees flying on commercial airlines in favor of charter flights. Steinbrenner blamed Martin for failure to keep discipline. Martin did not believe in trying to regulate the players' conduct off the field, something he had learned from Casey Stengel. Injuries to several players, including much of the starting staff, meant the Yankees did not commence the season as well as the previous year. By mid-June, the Yankees were seven games behind the Red Sox, and Steinbrenner was impatient. Martin was under extreme stress for much of the summer amid repeated rumors that he would be fired.

By July 17, the Yankees were 13 games behind Boston. That day, against the Royals, Jackson came to the plate in the bottom of the tenth inning with Munson on base and Martin put the bunt sign on. After Jackson fouled the first pitch off, the sign was taken off, with Jackson instructed to swing away. Jackson tried to bunt the next two pitches, and popped out. A furious Martin wanted Jackson suspended for the remainder of the season after the game, but agreed to suspend Jackson for five games after consulting with upper management. Matters came to a head when Jackson returned. Jackson told reporters that he did not know why Martin had suspended him. Martin also learned, from White Sox owner Bill Veeck, that Steinbrenner had been trying to arrange a trade of managers with the White Sox while publicly insisting that Martin would finish out the 1978 season. The plan called for White Sox manager Bob Lemon to go to the Yankees, with Martin succeeding Lemon in Chicago. However, the deal was not made and Lemon was subsequently fired by Veeck. Martin told reporters of Jackson and Steinbrenner (referring to the latter's illegal contributions to Nixon), "The two of them deserve each other. One's a born liar; the other's convicted."

The next day, July 24, 1978, Martin announced he was stepping aside for health reasons at a tearful press conference. He did so on the advice of his longtime legal adviser, Louisiana judge Eddie Sapir, who concluded earlier in the day that the Yankees would almost certainly fire him for cause. By resigning for reasons of health, Martin obligated Steinbrenner to honor his contract. Steinbrenner replaced Martin with Lemon. There was considerable anger among Yankee fans at Martin's forced departure, and towards Steinbrenner; some holders of season tickets burned them outside Yankee Stadium.

=== Billy II: Second stint with the Yankees (1979) ===
Steinbrenner almost immediately had second thoughts about Martin's departure, and negotiations for his return, including meetings between the two, began within two days of the resignation. At first, the plan was for Martin to return in 1979, working elsewhere in the organization until then, but Rosen felt Lemon, who replaced Martin, needed to be given a full year. The talks were successfully kept quiet, and at Old-Timers' Day at Yankee Stadium, July 29, 1978, Martin was introduced as the Yankee manager for 1980 and after by public address announcer Bob Sheppard, meeting an ovation from the crowd reputed to be second only to that given Lou Gehrig on his retirement in 1939. However, Golenblock believed it might have been greater, saying, "The fans liked Gehrig. They loved Billy."

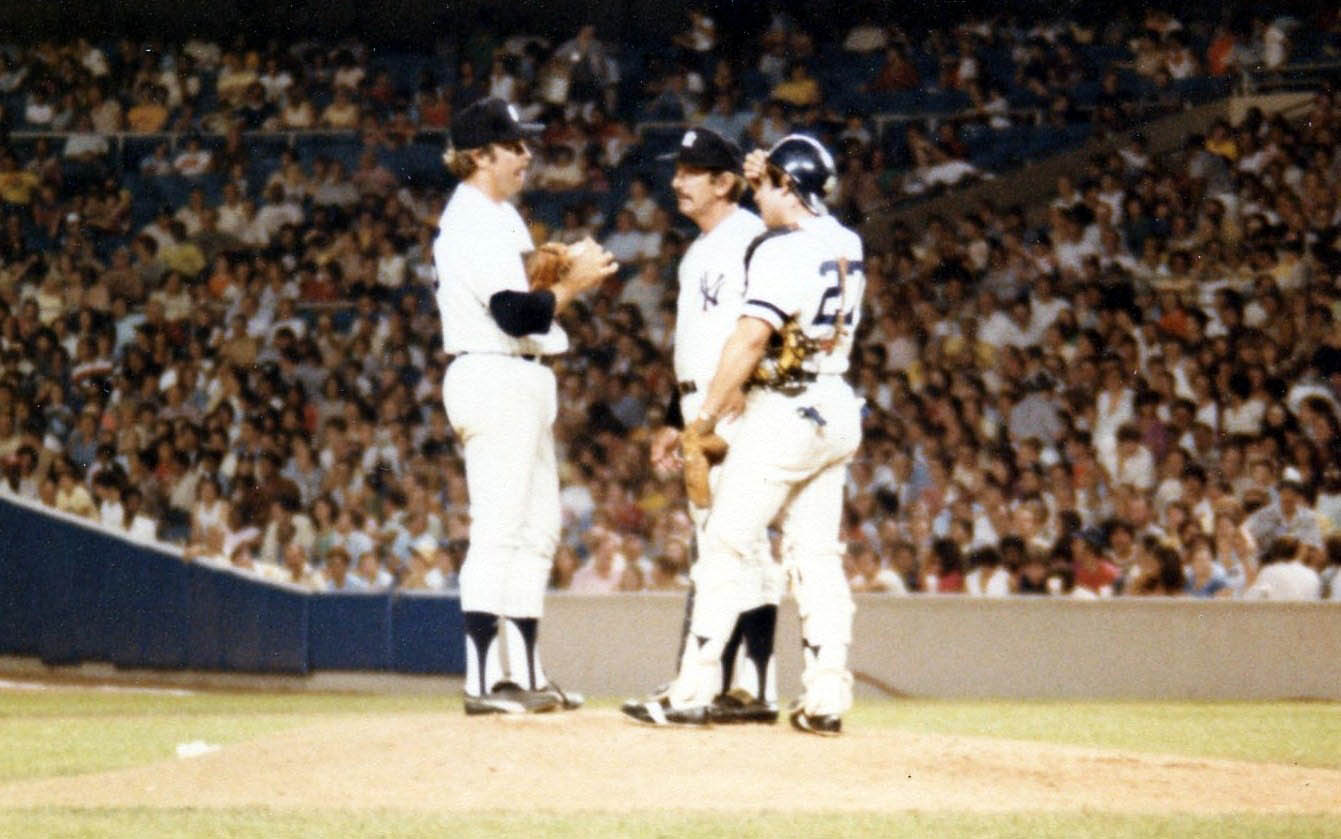
Martin (center) with pitcher Catfish Hunter and Brad Gulden during a 1979 game soon after Thurman Munson's death

The re-hiring was only a verbal commitment, and was to some extent dependent on Martin staying out of trouble, which he did not do. During the offseason, Martin engaged in fisticuffs with Reno Gazette reporter Ray Hagar while visiting the city as a guest of the Reno Bighorns basketball team. Steinbrenner insisted that Martin could return to the Yankees only if there was neither conviction nor out-of-court settlement, and this occurred, though money likely changed hands behind the scenes. In the interim, the Yankees, under Lemon, had made a dramatic comeback to win the division, pennant and their second consecutive World Series over the Dodgers.

In 1979, the Yankees got off to a slow start under Lemon. Injuries to Jackson and Gossage, and key players proving less effective than the year before had the Yankees reeling. Steinbrenner fired Lemon on June 18 and brought back Martin. The Yankees failed to improve, and Munson's death in a private plane crash on August 2 devastated the team. The Yankees were 34–30 when Martin took over and finished 89–71, in fourth place. After the season, Martin got into a fight with marshmallow salesman Joseph Cooper at a hotel in Minneapolis. Cooper said that Martin should not have won his American League Manager of the Year award, which he believed should have gone to Dick Williams or Earl Weaver. Martin, in his autobiography, replied by mocking Cooper's profession and in the process angered him to the point where Cooper challenged Martin to a fight. Martin responded by wagering $500 that he could beat Cooper and proceeded to do so. Facing pressure from the commissioner's office to do something about Martin's off-field conduct, Steinbrenner fired Martin five days later.

=== Oakland Athletics (1980–1982) ===
Martin did not get any immediate interest after being dismissed by the Yankees, but in February 1980, Oakland owner Charlie Finley sought to hire him. The A's had fallen far from their championship heyday of the early 1970s as Finley had refused to go along with the escalating salaries of free agency. In 1979, the team was 54–108 (.333), the second-worst record in baseball, and drew less than 4,000 per home game. In hopes of reviving the franchise, Finley turned to Martin. While the job brought Martin back to his East Bay roots, he was well aware that it might be his last chance, both because of the conflict that surrounded him and his somewhat limited success with the 1979 Yankees.

One of the players under contract to the A's was Glenn Burke, who in 1982 would become the first MLB former player to reveal he was gay. Claudell Washington later stated that Martin introduced Burke, "Oh, by the way, this is Glenn Burke and he's a f—-t.'" Burke suffered a knee injury during 1980 spring training; Burke's roommate Mike Norris stated that Martin used this as cover to send him to the minor leagues, not wanting him on the team. According to Norris, Martin cut Derek Bryant because the manager mistook him for Burke, stating "get that m---------ing homosexual out of there"; neither Burke nor Bryant ever played in MLB again.

The 1980 A's had few standouts, and many of the young players were in awe of Martin: some who later became stars credited Martin with developing them. He had Rickey Henderson steal only on signs until Henderson learned how to read pitchers in their windup; then Martin turned Henderson loose. According to Pennington, "under Billy's tutelage, Henderson became the best leadoff hitter and base stealer in the history of Major League Baseball." Many in baseball were surprised to find the A's only 2½ games behind the heavily favored Kansas City Royals at the end of May. The A's finished second in the AL West with an 83–79 record. Although they were 14 games behind the Royals, the 29-game improvement was enough to garner Martin a Manager of the Year award. Attendance at the Oakland–Alameda County Coliseum rose by over 500,000, a 175% increase, enabling Finley to sell the team at a better price.

The new owners, the Haas family, owners of Levi Strauss, were inexperienced in baseball. They gave Martin the additional title of player development director, with complete authority over the baseball side of the operation–effectively making him his own general manager. Martin brought his aggressive style of play, which was dubbed "Billyball" by a sportswriter early in the 1981 season. The name stuck; the A's later trademarked it. The A's were at 20–3 (.870) in early May, Martin appeared on the cover of Time magazine, and the five-man rotation was on the cover of Sports Illustrated. Mike Norris, Rick Langford, Matt Keough, Steve McCatty, and Brian Kingman had a cumulative ERA of 1.42. In 1980 the pitching staff threw 94 complete games–far and away the most in the American League–in part because Martin did not trust his untested bullpen. He was applauded by baseball fans across the country even when he was kicked out of a game and suspended by the league for a week for kicking dirt on the umpire. The Oakland momentum was finally checked by the 1981 Major League Baseball strike, which shut down baseball for nearly two months midseason. The season was split into two halves, the division leaders at the time of the strike (in the AL West, the A's) to play the second-half winners (the Royals) in a special division series. The A's won in three straight games to face the Yankees in the League Championship Series. The opportunity to beat the Yankees meant much to Martin, and Steinbrenner, seeing the Oakland success, was privately stating that he might have been too quick to fire Martin after the marshmallow salesman incident. But the veteran New York lineup and pitching staff was able to dominate the A's as the Yankees swept the series in three games.

With the best combined record in the American League and second-best combined record in all of baseball in 1981, expectations were high for the A's in 1982. However, the season did not go well for the A's, who never got much over .500. They had a 17–14 (.548) record after a win on May 10, then cooled down. By the All-Star break in mid-July, they were 38–50 (.432), twelve games back in sixth place, well out of the pennant race. None of the starting pitchers would match their 1981 form, and none ever would, leading to accusations from baseball historians and statisticians that Martin shortened their careers by overusing them in 1981. In 2006, Rob Neyer estimated that the four top starters from the 1981 team threw anywhere from 120 to 140 pitches per complete game—a heavy workload for pitchers even then, and especially so for pitchers as young as the A's rotation had been in 1981. The A's finished at 68–94 (.420), fifth in the AL West, easily the worst full-season record of Martin's managerial career.

On October 20, 1982, three weeks after the season ended, the A's fired him with three years remaining on his contract. Although the Haases did not hold Martin responsible for the on-field debacle, they had grown increasingly concerned about his off-field behavior and feared he was growing unstable. Incidents included considerable drinking and traveling with a mistress while on the road. The last straw came when Martin trashed his own office after team officials refused him a loan to pay a tax debt. There has been speculation that Martin had been assured by Steinbrenner that he would be Yankee manager in 1983 if he could get himself fired by Oakland, and he may have been acting to that end.

=== Remaining stints with the Yankees (1983, 1985, 1988) ===
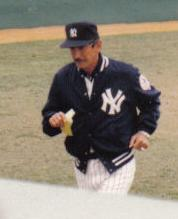
Martin as Yankees manager in 1983

The Yankees had finished fifth in 1982, their first losing record in the Steinbrenner era, doing so under three managers—Lemon, Gene Michael and Clyde King—all fired by Steinbrenner.

On January 11, 1983, the Yankees announced that Martin had been hired as manager under a long-term contract. He would remain on the Yankees' payroll for the rest of his life. Jackson had departed for the California Angels, but other Yankees from Martin's earlier tenures remained, such as Randolph and Ron Guidry, and the team had added strong players like Dave Winfield and Don Baylor. Steinbrenner had pledged non-interference but, as the team struggled early in the season, resumed his second-guessing of Martin, both directly and by leak to the media. As relations between owner and manager deteriorated, Martin had conflicts with reporters and a brawl with a patron in an Anaheim bar.

During the 1983 season, Martin was involved in one of the most controversial regular season games, known as the Pine Tar Incident, when Martin challenged a home run by George Brett on the grounds that the amount of pine tar on the bat broke the rules. Brett was ruled out and the home run disallowed; as this occurred with two out in the top of the ninth, it ended the game with the Yankees leading 4–3. American League President Lee MacPhail ruled in favor of the Royals' protest. The game was resumed some weeks later with Kansas City leading 5–4 and two out in the top half of the ninth. At the start of the resumed game, Martin tried to protest on the grounds that Brett had missed a base. The umpires had anticipated this, and had obtained an affidavit from the crew who had worked the original game saying that Brett had indeed touched all the bases. The Yankees did not play as well during and after the distraction of the Pine Tar Game, and fell further behind the division-leading Orioles. The Yankees finished second, 91–71, seven games behind the Orioles. On December 16, Steinbrenner removed Martin as manager, giving him a scouting assignment, and replacing him with Berra.

The Yankees finished third under Berra, 17 games behind the Tigers. When, at the start of the 1985 season, Steinbrenner pledged that Berra would remain manager for the whole season, there was immediate speculation that Martin would return at the earliest opportunity. As it turned out, Steinbrenner fired Berra after 16 games and replaced him with Martin. Stated Martin, "George and I have the greatest relationship I've ever had with him." With an MVP season from Don Mattingly and a strong effort from Rickey Henderson, who had been acquired by the Yankees, the team played well throughout the summer, coming to within a game and a half of the division-leading Toronto Blue Jays on September 12. They then lost eight in a row, and as the Yankees fell out of the race, according to Pennington, "Martin seemed to melt down with it." On September 22, 1985, while at a hotel bar in Baltimore, Martin fought one of his pitchers, Ed Whitson, who was larger, heavier and trained in martial arts. Martin suffered a broken arm. The Yankees recovered to win 97 games, but finished two games back of the Blue Jays, eliminated on the second to last day of the season. On October 27, 1985, Martin was fired again as Yankee manager, replaced by longtime Yankee player Lou Piniella. Nevertheless, Steinbrenner, believing that Martin could again bring a championship to the Yankees and, fearing he might do so elsewhere, increased Martin's salary; the four-time manager of the Yankees turned down lucrative offers from the White Sox and Indians.

Steinbrenner kept Martin as a close advisor in 1986; he was formally part of the broadcasting staff under his personal services contract, which the owner extended so that Martin was now earning over $300,000 per year, a sum he was unlikely to match as manager elsewhere. Steinbrenner had considerable affection for Martin and wanted him to be without financial worries. Martin had long wanted to see his number 1 retired by the Yankees. Seeking to keep his past and future manager happy, Steinbrenner agreed, and Billy Martin Day took place at Yankee Stadium on August 10, 1986. At the ceremony, during which the number was retired and Martin given a plaque in Monument Park, he stated, "I may not have been the greatest Yankee to ever put on the uniform but I was the proudest."

New York finished second behind the Red Sox in 1986, but were never really in contention, and finished fourth in 1987. After the season, Piniella was asked to accept a promotion to general manager so that Steinbrenner could make Martin manager for a fifth time in 1988. Despite minimal expectations, Martin got the 1988 Yankees off to a good start. However, on the night of May 7, Martin was involved in a brawl at a Dallas-area nightclub in which he came out worst. Already foreseeing the end, and with marital troubles, on May 30, Martin was kicked out of a game against the A's, flinging dirt on umpire Dale Scott. Martin was suspended for three games and fined by the league. However, the umpires' union thought this was too lenient. The American League crew chiefs announced that Martin would be ejected as soon as he left the Yankee dugout. A month later, Steinbrenner fired Martin, citing "a combination of factors" in explaining his decision; Pennington suggested that while many Yankee fans took to talk radio in anger at Martin's firing, there was less outrage than there had been in the 1970s, and greater concern for Martin as a person. He became a special adviser to Steinbrenner, though in practice he had no duties and rarely visited New York.

Piniella returned as manager, but was fired at the end of the 1988 season after the Yankees played sub-.500 ball during his second stint. Steinbrenner replaced him with Dallas Green. The Yankees saw little success under Green in 1989, and he was fired in August, replaced by Bucky Dent. Steinbrenner was unconvinced that Dent could lead the Yankees back to a championship, and planned to keep Martin close at hand as manager-in-waiting should Dent falter in 1990. He apparently told Martin of this during a November meeting at Yankee Stadium. Soon afterward, Martin got in touch with several of his former coaches and told them to be ready to join him for a sixth managerial tenure with the Yankees.

== Death ==
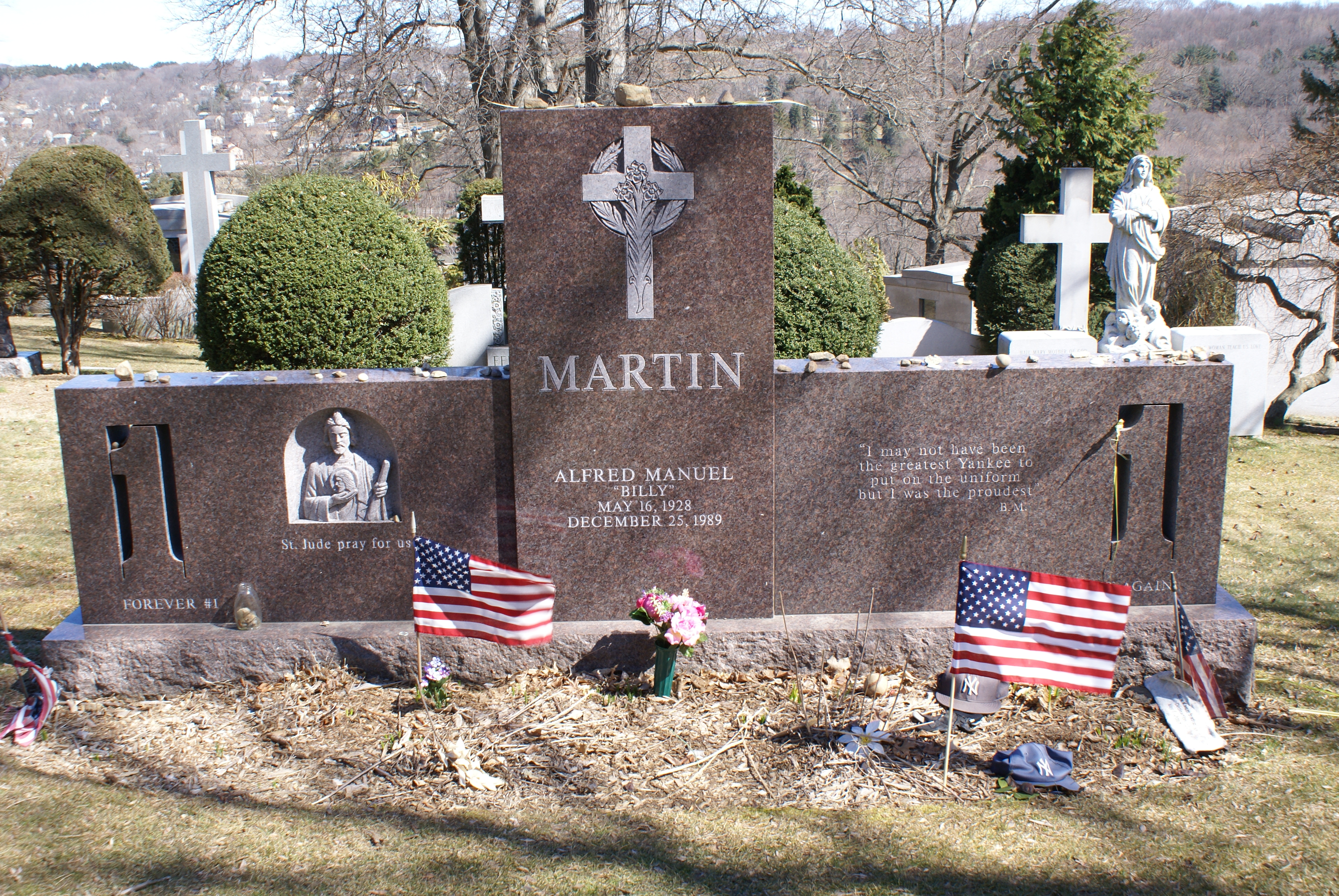
Billy Martin's grave in Gate of Heaven Cemetery

Martin was still a special consultant to Steinbrenner when he was killed in a low speed single-vehicle accident on Christmas Day 1989. His vehicle ran into a drainage culvert near the entrance of the driveway to his farm in Port Crane, north of Binghamton, New York. He was pronounced dead at a hospital in Johnson City, New York.

Also present in the vehicle that night was Martin's friend Bill Reedy, who had been drinking with Martin at a local bar, and who was seriously injured in the accident. Reedy at first stated that he had driven the vehicle with Martin the passenger but after learning that Martin had died, changed his story, saying that he had lied to protect Martin against the consequences of a drunk driving conviction. He was convicted in a jury trial of driving with a blood alcohol level of .10, was fined, and his license suspended. A subsequent civil trial also found he was the driver. Golenbock, who wrote his book after the criminal trial but before the civil, was convinced that Martin was the driver. In this, he joined Martin's children and some of his close friends, like Mickey Mantle, who believed Martin would not have allowed another to drive him that night. Martin's biographers point to inadequacies in the police investigation. Pennington noted that those who believe Martin was the driver are the minority; Reedy was seen holding the car keys as the two left the bar, and the positions of the men when rescuers arrived pointed to Reedy being the driver. No autopsy was performed, allegedly due to opposition by Martin's widow and by Steinbrenner; New York City Medical Examiner Michael Baden was allowed to examine the body.

Martin was eulogized by Cardinal John O'Connor at St. Patrick's Cathedral, New York, before his interment at Gate of Heaven Cemetery in Hawthorne, New York. His grave is located about 150 feet (46 m) from Babe Ruth's, in Section 25. The following epitaph, spoken by Martin at his number retiring ceremony at Yankee Stadium in 1986, appears on the headstone: "I may not have been the greatest Yankee to put on the uniform, but I was the proudest." Steinbrenner and former United States President Richard Nixon, along with many New York Yankee greats, attended Martin's funeral service.

== Managerial record ==
Team	Year	Regular season					Postseason			
Team	Year	Games	Won	Lost	Win %	Finish	Won	Lost	Win %	Result
MIN	1969	162	97	65	.599	1st in AL West	0	3	.000	Lost ALCS (BAL)
MIN total		162	97	65	.599		0	3	.000	
DET	1971	162	91	71	.562	2nd in AL East	–	–	–	–
DET	1972	156	86	70	.551	1st in AL East	2	3	.400	Lost ALCS (OAK)
DET	1973	134	71	63	.530	fired	–	–	–	–
DET total		452	248	204	.549		2	3	.400	
TEX	1973	23	9	14	.391	6th in AL West	–	–	–	–
TEX	1974	160	84	76	.525	2nd in AL West	–	–	–	–
TEX	1975	95	44	51	.463	fired	–	–	–	–
TEX total		278	137	141	.493		0	0	–	
NYY	1975	56	30	26	.536	3rd in AL East	–	–	–	–
NYY	1976	159	97	62	.610	1st in AL East	3	6	.333	Lost World Series (CIN)
NYY	1977	162	100	62	.617	1st in AL East	7	4	.636	Won World Series (LAD)
NYY	1978	94	52	42	.553	fired	–	–	–	–
NYY	1979	95	55	40	.579	4th in AL East	–	–	–	–
OAK	1980	162	83	79	.512	2nd in AL West	–	–	–	–
OAK	1981	60	37	23	.617	1st in AL West	3	3	.500	Lost ALCS (NYY)
OAK	1981	49	27	22	.551	2nd in AL West	3	3	.500	Lost ALCS (NYY)
OAK	1982	162	68	94	.420	5th in AL West	–	–	–	–
OAK total		433	215	218	.497		3	3	.500	
NYY	1983	162	91	71	.562	3rd in AL East	–	–	–	–
NYY	1985	145	91	54	.628	2nd in AL East	–	–	–	–
NYY	1988	68	40	28	.588	fired	–	–	–	–
NYY total		941	556	385	.591		10	10	.500	
Total		2266	1253	1013	.553		15	19	.441	

== Managerial techniques ==
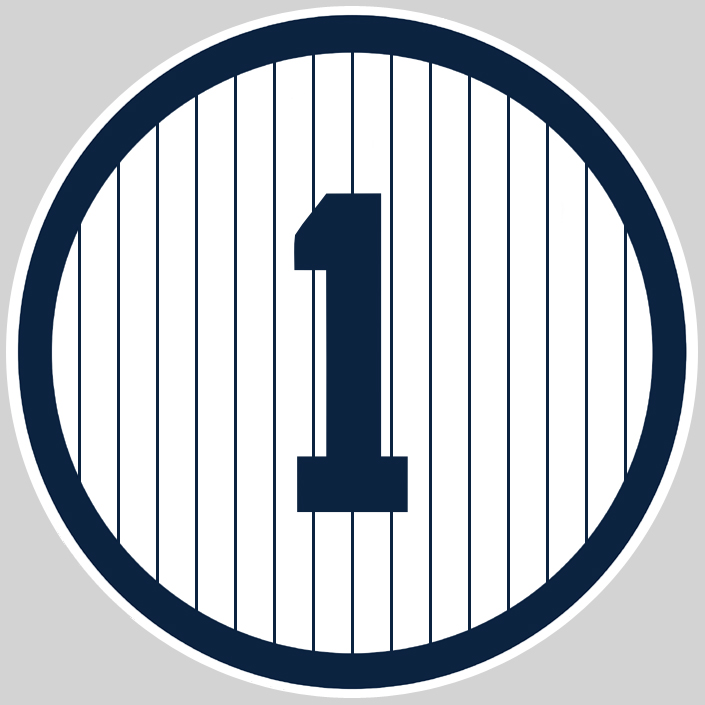
Billy Martin's number 1 was retired by the New York Yankees in 1986.

Bill James noted that "Billy Martin, of course, improved every team he ever managed in his first year in control, usually by huge margins. Within a year or two, all of those teams were ready to get rid of him." According to Chris Jaffe in his book evaluating baseball managers, "Martin was the perfect manager to hire if you wanted an immediate improvement and the worst manager for a team seeking sustained success." Part of this, Jaffe argued, was because Martin "would do whatever it took to win that day, and not worry about any negative side effects in the future", even if it meant a shortened career for his players. The subsequent ineffectiveness of the young starting pitchers on the 1981 A's is cited by Jaffe as one example of this; others include pitcher Catfish Hunter, who completed every game he started but one during Martin's partial season with the 1975 Yankees, and who was never the same pitcher after that year, and Ferguson Jenkins with Texas in 1974, who pitched 29 complete games for the Rangers, and who declined thereafter. A similar attitude permeated his use of relief pitchers: "he wanted who he wanted when he wanted without concern towards keeping their arms well rested."

In 1988, the Elias Sports Bureau proclaimed Martin the best manager in major league history, based on modeling that found that Martin's teams won 7.45 more games per year than they should have as predicted by statistics, higher than any other manager. He was the first manager to have led four different teams to the postseason, a feat that would not be matched until 2012 nor bettered until 2020, by which time the postseason had expanded greatly from Martin's day. Martin sought to catch the other team by surprise, using such techniques as stealing home—once having two Twins steal home on different pitches of the same at bat, with the slugger Harmon Killebrew at the plate. Stealing home is a tactic unlikely to succeed, yet Martin made it work, and his teams got better. Jaffe noted that with Minnesota in 1969, Martin ended such risky tactics well before the end of the season, by which time he had set the tone he wanted both with his team, and with opponents. According to Jimmy Keenan and Frank Russo in their biography of Martin for the Society for American Baseball Research (SABR), "He played the game hard and made no excuses for the way he handled himself on or off the field. Many people, including his off-and-on boss, George Steinbrenner, considered Martin a baseball genius for the intuitive way he managed his teams."

Hall of Fame Manager Tony La Russa stated of him, "without reservation I would call Billy the most brilliant field manager I ever saw. He was unmatched. None of us felt up to him." Stengel stated in an interview a month before his death in 1975, "He's a good manager. He might be a little selfish about some things he does and he may think he knows more about baseball than anybody else and it wouldn't surprise me if he was right." When asked why he had admired Martin as a player, Stengel replied, "If liking a kid who never let you down in the clutch is favoritism, then I plead guilty." James deemed Martin the third-most successful manager of the 1970s, behind Sparky Anderson and Earl Weaver, and the most controversial. Pennington also noted that those who fired Martin for his off-field behavior went out of their way to praise what he had done on the field. Campbell, for instance, said that "from foul line to foul line, Billy did a good job," while the A's told Sapir that "we won't find a better manager" than Martin.

Falkner noted that what Martin wanted was "to win, period", and quoted him as saying, "I would play Hitler, Mussolini and Tojo on my team if I thought it would help me win." Willie Randolph stated, "you always knew if you got to the eighth or ninth inning and you were tied or one run down, Billy would find a way to win". Falkner noted, "he wanted to win, that was all. And for the time he was in the game, everyone knew it. And he won." Jaffe suggested that the person Martin was most akin to was not any other baseball manager, but Hernando Cortez, the conquistador who burned his own ships after arriving in Mexico, forcing his soldiers to conquer or die. "That was Billyball, sixteenth century style."

Pennington believed that Martin was very much a person of his times: "In the age of several round-the-clock ESPN channels, the ceaseless chatter of sports talk radio, and omnipresent smartphone cameras, Billy could not exist. At least not as an employed baseball manager." Pennington suggested, though, that had Martin been born 20 years later, his friends would have confronted him about his drinking problem; in Martin's day, such things were more often ignored. Pennington believes Martin's reputation for brawling and drinking has kept him out of the Hall of Fame; even if other managers who are in the Hall, such as Weaver and Leo Durocher, got into fights and drank sometimes to excess, they did not acquire the same reputation for those things as did Martin. Golenbock suggested that Martin's alcoholism, together with his pride in being a Yankee kept him in a relationship with Steinbrenner that kept him willing to try to manage the team again and again, despite the difficult relationship with the owner.

== Personal life and public image ==
Martin was married four times and had two children, a daughter named Kelly Ann and a son named Billy Joe. His first marriage was to Lois Berndt, who was the mother of Kelly Ann. She divorced him in 1955, after he had contested the action for more than a year on the grounds that he was Catholic. He married Gretchen Winkler in 1961. Billy Joe was born of that marriage; his parents divorced in 1979. He was married a third time, to Heather Ervolino, while he was managing in Oakland. He married his mistress, freelance photographer Jillian Guiver, in January 1988.

Heather Ervolio sued Martin in 1986 for $500,000, aimed at halting her eviction from the luxury home they had shared for five years. She alleged that Martin began seeing her when she was 16 and was still married to his second wife, Gretchen Winkler, and then abruptly abandoned her. She alleged this was a pattern of behavior for Martin, that he had abandoned his previous wife Jill at a bar to marry Heather in 1982. After his death the feud between Martin's children and his widow Jill became a prominent story in the New York newspapers. Billy's children and other relatives alleged that Jill was hiding their inheritance and in protest several family members refused to attend his funeral.

Martin and Steinbrenner appeared together in the series of "Tastes Great!...Less Filling!" commercials for Miller Lite beer. In one, filmed in 1978, during the final days of Martin's first stint with the Yankees, Steinbrenner fires Martin, who says, "Oh, not again". Within weeks, Martin was forced to resign over the "one's a born liar, and the other's convicted" statement. The commercial aired again in June 1979, following Martin's return to manage the Yankees a second time, but with Steinbrenner saying "You're hired."

In 1978, Martin played himself in the CBS TV movie One in a Million: The Ron LeFlore Story. Martin was a guest ring announcer at the inaugural WrestleMania in March 1985. On May 24, 1986, on the season finale of Saturday Night Live, co-host Martin was "fired" by executive producer Lorne Michaels for being "drunk" in a skit, slurring his lines. In retaliation, Martin set the dressing room on fire, a staged scene set as a cliffhanger for the following season.

In 1978, Martin and sports agent Doug Newton opened Billy Martin's, a western wear boutique in New York City. Newton bought out Martin in 1982; the store remained open until 2010.

== Appraisal ==
Pennington, writing over 20 years after Martin's death, explained, "Billy was beloved because he represented a traditional American dream: freedom. He lived independent from rules. He bucked the system ... He told his boss to shove it. Often." The biographer complained that Martin, in the era of video clips and ESPN, has been reduced to a caricature: the man who kicked dirt on umpires, battled with Reggie Jackson in a dugout and who was forever being hired and fired, something that ignores a record of achievement both as player and manager. Appel noted, "There was never a more prideful Yankee. Or a more complicated one."

James wrote, "I suppose one could say the same about Billy Martin or about Richard Nixon ... had he not been so insecure, he could have resisted the self-destructive excesses which gradually destroyed him". Pennington, who covered the Yankees as a newspaper reporter from 1985 to 1989, described Martin as "without question one of the most magnetic, entertaining, sensitive, humane, brilliant, generous, insecure, paranoid, dangerous, irrational, and unhinged people I had ever met". Golenbock, who co-wrote Martin's autobiography, said of him, "but because Billy was an alcoholic who drank and fought publicly, and because the man for whom he worked destroyed his reputation through constant public denigrations and firings, he may never join the hallowed hall where he should rightfully be placed next to his mentor, Casey Stengel."

Mike Lupica of the Daily News wrote that "Yankee fans never seemed to see him drunk, or nasty, or as Steinbrenner's toady, the way others did. They looked the other way, again and again and again. They always saw him as Billy the Kid." Pennington noted that the new owners of Martin's farm sometimes find fans wanting to see where he died, or makeshift memorials by the roadside where the accident occurred. Martin's grave has remained well-visited by Yankee fans, sometimes before driving to the Bronx to take in a home game. Andrew Nagle, who oversaw the cemetery, stated "people want to leave some acknowledgement of what he meant to them ... we don't let go of the people that touched us ... It's the same with Billy Martin. People won't let him go. They won't forget him."

== See also ==
- List of Major League Baseball managerial wins and winning percentage leaders
- List of Major League Baseball managers with most career ejections

== Bibliography ==
- Appel, Marty (2012). Pinstripe Empire: The New York Yankees From Before the Babe to After the Boss. New York: Bloomsbury Publishing. ISBN 978-1-60819-492-6.
- Appel, Marty (2017). Casey Stengel: Baseball's Greatest Character (Kindle ed.). New York: Doubleday. ISBN 978-0-385-54048-3.
- Falkner, David (1992). The Last Yankee: The Turbulent Life of Billy Martin. New York: Simon & Schuster. ISBN 978-0-671-72662-1.
- Golenbock, Peter (2014) [1994]. Wild, High and Tight: The Life and Death of Billy Martin (Kindle version of Antenna Books ebook ed.). New York: Antenna Books. ISBN 978-1-62306-022-0.
- Jaffe, Chris (2010). Evaluating Baseball's Managers (Kindle ed.). Jefferson, NC: McFarland & Co. ISBN 978-0-7864-3920-1.
- James, Bill (1997). The Bill James Guide to Baseball Managers from 1870 to Today (Kindle ed.). New York: Diversion Books. ISBN 978-1-62681-263-5.
- Pennington, Bill (2016) [2015]. Billy Martin: Baseball's Flawed Genius (Kindle version of first Mariner Books ed.). New York: Houghton Mifflin Harcourt Publishing Company. ISBN 978-0-544-02294-2.
- Shropshire, Mike (2014) [1996]. Seasons in Hell: With Billy Martin, Whitey Herzog, and the Worst Baseball Team in History, the 1973–1975 Texas Rangers (Kindle version of first Diversion Books ed.). New York: Diversion Books. ISBN 978-1-62681-261-1.

Sporting positions
Preceded by Floyd Baker	Minnesota Twins third base coach 1965–1968	Succeeded by Johnny Goryl
Preceded by Carroll Hardy	Denver Bears manager May 27 – September 8, 1968	Succeeded by Don Heffner
