= Honey Boy =

Honey Boy may refer to:

== People ==
- Honeyboy Edwards (1915–2011), American Delta blues guitarist and singer from Mississippi
- George "Honey Boy" Evans (1870–1915), Welsh-born songwriter and vaudeville entertainer
- Honey Boy Martin (born c. 1949), Jamaican reggae singer on 2001's How to Cut and Paste Mix Tape Vol.2
- Honey Boy (singer) (born c. 1955), Jamaican-born English reggae singer best known for his recordings in 1970s

== Other uses ==
- "Honey Boy" (1907 song), Tin Pan Alley song for voice and piano written by Jack Norworth and composed by Albert Von Tilzer first published in 1907
- "Honey Boy" (Purple Disco Machine and Benjamin Ingrosso song), 2024
- Honey Boy (film), 2019 American drama
