= Lew Brown =

Musical artist and Great American Songbook lyricist (1893–1958)

- From a promotional CD, issued c. 1998

Background information
- Born: Louis Brownstein; December 10, 1893; Odessa, Russian Empire
- Died: February 5, 1958 (aged 64) New York City, United States
- Genres: Popular music
- Occupation: Lyricist
- Years active: 1910s–1940s

Lew Brown (born Louis Brownstein; December 10, 1893 – February 5, 1958) was a lyricist for popular songs in the United States. During World War I and the Roaring Twenties, he wrote lyrics for several of the top Tin Pan Alley composers, especially Albert Von Tilzer. Brown was one third of a successful songwriting and music publishing team with Buddy DeSylva and Ray Henderson from 1925 until 1931. Brown also wrote or co-wrote many Broadway shows and Hollywood films. Among his most-popular songs are "Button Up Your Overcoat", "Don't Sit Under the Apple Tree", "Life Is Just a Bowl of Cherries", "That Old Feeling", and "The Birth of the Blues".

== Early life and family ==
Brown was born December 10, 1893, in Odessa, Russian Empire, part of today's Ukraine, the son of Etta (Hirsch) and Jacob Brownstein. His family was Jewish. When he was five, his family immigrated to the United States and settled in New York City. He attended DeWitt Clinton High School but he left, at the suggestion of a teacher, to pursue his songwriting career without graduating.

Lew Brown was married first to Sylvia Fiske, then to Catherine "June" Brown until his death. He had two daughters from his first marriage, Naomi Brown Greif and Arlyne Brown Mulligan who was married to the prominent jazz saxophonist Gerry Mulligan.

== Career ==
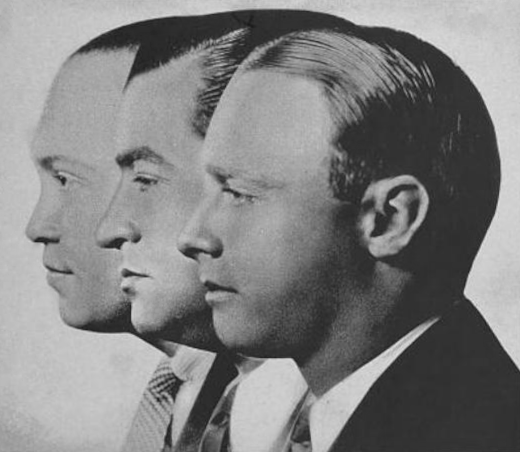
Brown (center) with Buddy DeSylva and Ray Henderson

Brown started writing for Tin Pan Alley in 1912 and collaborated with established composers, like Albert Von Tilzer. Two of their well-known works that year were "(I'm Going Back to) Kentucky Sue" and "I'm the Lonesomest Gal in Town". Brown then wrote a string of popular World War I songs during 1914–1918, teaming with Von Tilzer, Al Harriman, and other composers.

In 1925, Brown formed his most-successful songwriting partnership with Buddy DeSylva and Ray Henderson. Their cheerful hits, such as "Button Up Your Overcoat" and "The Birth of the Blues", earned lasting appreciation for "the rich variety of verbal mosaics" and "the suggestive imagery that was their trademark". DeSylva left in 1931 but Brown and Henderson continued scoring Broadway shows. Brown also worked with other composers, like Sammy Fain. "Brown in 1939 estimated that he had written or collaborated on about 7,000 songs."

Brown wrote the lyrics to "Don't Sit Under the Apple Tree" (1942), which appeared in the film Private Buckaroo. Recordings by Glenn Miller and by the Andrews Sisters popularized the song with World War II soldiers and radio audiences. Not long after this hit, Brown retired from songwriting.

=== Honors and awards ===
Brown and Fain's "That Old Feeling" (1937) was nominated for an Academy Award for Best Original Song. "Don't Sit Under the Apple Tree" was inducted into the Grammy Hall of Fame. Von Tilzer, DeSylva, Brown and Henderson were all included in the inaugural class of the Songwriters Hall of Fame.

=== Biographical film ===
The DeSylva, Brown and Henderson songwriting team was the subject of the 1956 musical biopic: The Best Things in Life Are Free, produced by the Ephrons and based on a storyline by John O'Hara, who would have met and known them in twenties New York. Brown, who was still living when the film came out, was portrayed somewhat unflatteringly as being the most pugnacious and flawed of the trio by lookalike Ernest Borgnine.

== Death ==
Brown died of a heart attack at home in New York City on February 5, 1958.

== Individual songs ==
- Cecil Mack and Lew Brown, "Shine". Music: Ford Dabney. 1910.
- Albert Von Tilzer and Lew Brown. "(I'm Going Back to) Kentucky Sue". New York: The York Music Co., 1912. OCLC 16992118
- Albert Von Tilzer and Lew Brown. "I'm The Lonesomest Gal In Town". New York: The York Music Co., 1912.
- Edgar Leslie and Lew Brown. "They Start in to Battle Again". New York, 1914.
- Albert Von Tilzer and Lew Brown. "Au Revoir But Not Good Bye, Soldier Boy". Broadway Music, 1917. OCLC 459552706
- Albert Von Tilzer and Lew Brown. "I May Be Gone for a Long, Long Time". Broadway Music, 1917. OCLC 20119729
- Albert Von Tilzer, Charles McCarron, and Lew Brown. "What Kind of an American are You?". Broadway Music, 1917. OCLC 72437572
- Darl MacBoyle and Lew Brown. "Since Johnny Got His Gun". Music: Albert Von Tilzer. New York, 1917.
- "I'll Come Back to You When It's All Over". Music: Kerry Mills. 1917.
- Al Harriman and Lew Brown. "I'm Writing to You, Sammy". New York, 1917.
- Al Harriman and Lew Brown. "I Can't Stay Here While You're Over There". New York, 1918.
- Lew Brown and Al Harriman. "I Wonder What They're Doing To-Night (Your Girl and Mine)". Music: Jack Egan. New York, 1918.
- Al Harriman and Lew Brown. "We'll Do Our Share (While You're Over There)". Music: Jack Egan. New York, 1918.
- Will Clayton and Lew Brown. "(Watch, Hope, and Wait) Little Girl ('I'm Coming Back to You')". New York, 1918.
- Albert Von Tilzer and Lew Brown. "I May Stay Away a Little Longer". New York, 1918.
- Albert Von Tilzer and Lew Brown. "Oh By Jingo!" 1919.
- Max Friedman, Lew Porter and Lew Brown. "Tillie Don't Be So Silly". New York, 1919.
- Albert Von Tilzer and Lew Brown. "Dapper Dan", 1921.
- "Last Night on the Back Porch". Music: Carl Schraubstader. 1923.
- Lew Brown and Sidney Clare. "Then I'll Be Happy". Music: Cliff Friend. 1925.
- Lew Brown and Billy Rose. Don't Bring Lulu". Music: Ray Henderson. 1925.
- Buddy DeSylva and Lew Brown. "The Birth of the Blues". Music: Ray Henderson. 1926.
- Buddy DeSylva and Lew Brown. "It All Depends on You". Music: Ray Henderson. 1926.
- Buddy DeSylva and Lew Brown. "Lucky Day". Music: Ray Henderson. 1926.
- Buddy DeSylva and Lew Brown. "The Best Things in Life Are Free". Music: Ray Henderson. 1927.
- Buddy DeSylva and Lew Brown. "So Blue". Music: Ray Henderson. 1927.
- Buddy DeSylva and Lew Brown. "The Varsity Drag". Music: Ray Henderson. 1927. OCLC 223326831
- Buddy DeSylva and Lew Brown. "Button Up Your Overcoat". Music: Ray Henderson. 1928.
- Buddy DeSylva and Lew Brown. "You're the Cream in My Coffee". Music: Ray Henderson. 1928.
- Buddy DeSylva and Lew Brown. "Sonny Boy". Music: Ray Henderson. 1928.
- Buddy DeSylva and Lew Brown. "Together". Music: Ray Henderson. 1928.
- Buddy DeSylva and Lew Brown. "I'm A Dreamer, Aren't We All?". Music: Ray Henderson. 1929.
- Buddy DeSylva and Lew Brown. "Sunny Side Up". Music: Ray Henderson. 1929.
- Buddy DeSylva and Lew Brown. "One More Time". Music: Ray Henderson. 1931.
- "Life Is Just a Bowl of Cherries". Music: Ray Henderson. 1931.
- "That's Why Darkies Were Born". Music: Ray Henderson. 1931.
- "Stand Up and Cheer". Music: Harry Akst. 1934.
- "That Old Feeling". Music: Sammy Fain. 1937.
- Lew Brown and Wladimir Timm. "Beer Barrel Polka" (English lyrics). 1939.
- Lew Brown, Charles Tobias, and Sam H. Stept. "Comes Love". 1939.
- Lew Brown, Charles Tobias, and Sam H. Stept. "Don't Sit Under the Apple Tree (with Anyone Else but Me)". New York: Robbins Music Corp, 1942. OCLC 26008183

== Theater and film productions ==
Theater source: Playbill Vault

- George White's Scandals of 1925 – revue – co-lyricist
- George White's Scandals of 1926 – revue – co-lyricist
- Good News (1927) – musical – co-lyricist
- Manhattan Mary (1927) – musical – contributing composer, lyricist, bookwriter
- George White's Scandals of 1928 – revue – co-lyricist
- Hold Everything! (1928) – musical – co-lyricist
- Three Cheers (1928) – musical – contributing lyricist
- The Singing Fool (1928) – musical film – co-lyricist
- Sunny Side Up (1929) – musical film – co-lyricist, co-bookwriter
- Follow Thru (1929) – musical – co-lyricist
- Follow Thru (1930) – musical film – co-lyricist
- Flying High (1930) – musical – co-lyricist
- Flying High (1931) – musical film – co-lyricist
- George White's Scandals of 1931 – revue – lyricist
- Indiscreet (1931) – comedy film – co-producer, co-writer, co-lyricist
- Hot-Cha! (1932) – musical – lyricist, co-bookwriter
- Strike Me Pink (1933) – revue – co-producer, lyricist, co-writer, production co-supervisor
- Calling All Stars (1934) – revue – producer, co-writer, lyricist, co-director, production supervisor
- Stand Up and Cheer! (1934) – musical film – associate producer, co-composer, lyricist, co-bookwriter
- Walter Wanger's Vogues of 1938 – featured co-songwriter for "That Old Feeling"
- Yokel Boy (1939) – musical – producer, director, bookwriter, co-composer, co-lyricist
- Crazy With the Heat (1941) – revue – director
- Good News (1947) – musical film – co-lyricist
- Mr. Wonderful (1956) – musical – featured co-songwriter for "The Birth of the Blues"

Posthumous credits

- Good News (1974 revision/revival) – co-composer, co-lyricist
- Big Deal (1986) – musical – featured co-songwriter for "Life Is Just a Bowl of Cherries" and "Button Up Your Overcoat"
- Fosse (1999) – revue – featured co-songwriter for "Life is Just a Bowl of Cherries"
- Swing! (1999) – revue – featured co-songwriter for "Don't Sit Under the Apple Tree"
