= Albert Von Tilzer =

American songwriter (1878–1956)

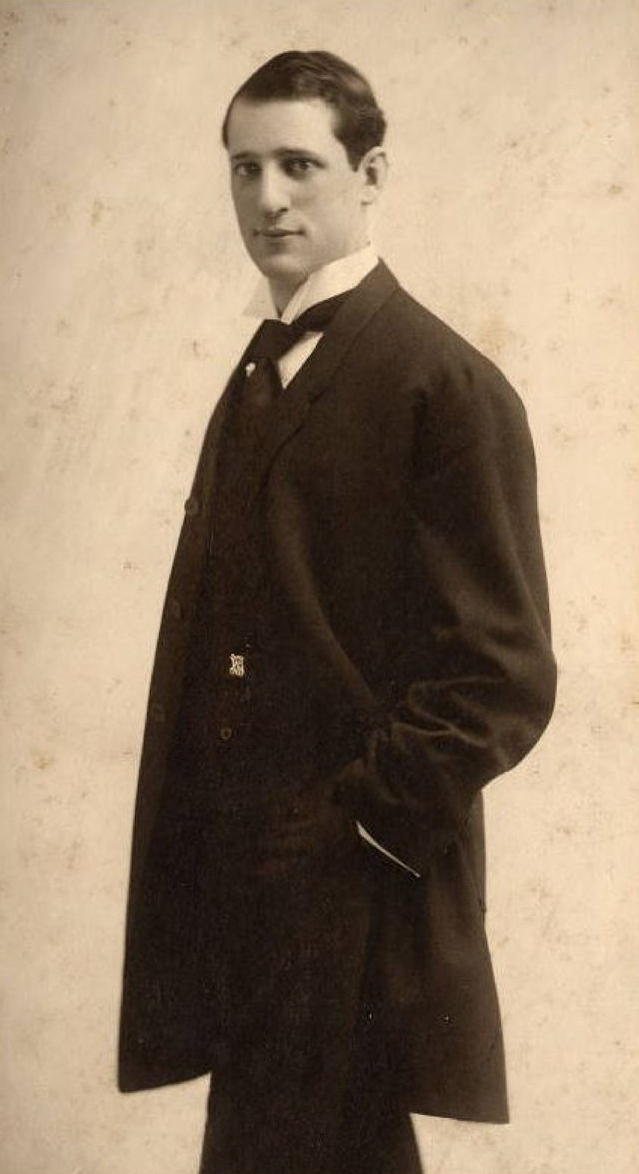

Background information
- Born: Albert Gumm; March 29, 1878; Indianapolis, Indiana, U.S.
- Died: October 1, 1956 (aged 78) Los Angeles, California, U.S.

Albert Von Tilzer (born Elias Gumbinsky (changed to Albert Gumm); March 29, 1878 – October 1, 1956) was an American songwriter, the younger brother of fellow songwriter Harry Von Tilzer. He wrote the music to many hit songs, most notably "Take Me Out to the Ball Game".

== Early life ==
He was born Elias Gumbinsky (changed to Albert Gumm), in Indianapolis, Indiana, United States. His parents, Sarah (Tilzer) and Jacob Gumbinsky, were Polish Jewish immigrants. As a young man, he worked briefly at his older brother Harry Von Tilzer's publishing company, and Albert's earliest songs were published by Harry.

Harry had adopted his mother's maiden name, Tilzer, as his own. He sought to make it sound even classier by tacking on the German nobiliary particle "Von". So impressive seemed the transformation that eventually all his brothers (Albert, Will, and Jules) had changed their last name to match his.

== Career ==
Within a few years Albert formed his own firm, The York Publishing Company.

By 1913, Albert had closed The York Publishing Company and joined the firm of his brother Will Von Tilzer.

Albert Von Tilzer was a top Tin Pan Alley tune writer, producing numerous popular music compositions from 1900 continuing through the early 1950s. He collaborated with many lyricists, including Jack Norworth, Lew Brown, and Harry MacPherson. A number of his tunes were performed (and recorded) by jazz bands and continue to be played decades later.

His songs included "The Alcoholic Blues", "Au Revoir But Not Good Bye, Soldier Boy", "Chili Bean", "Dapper Dan", "Don't Take My Darling Boy Away", "Honey Boy", "I May Be Gone for a Long, Long Time", "(I'll Be With You) In Apple Blossom Time", "I'm Glad I'm Married", "I'm the Lonesomest Gal in Town", "I Used to Love You But It's All Over Now", "The Moon Has His Eye On You", "My Cutey's Due at Two-to-Two Today", "My Little Girl", "Oh By Jingo!", "Oh How She Could Yacki-Hacki, Wicki-Wacki, Woo" (interpolated into the show Houp La!, 1916, and recorded by Ida Adams), "Put on Your Slippers and Fill Up Your Pipe, You're Not Going Bye-Bye Tonight", "Put Your Arms Around Me Honey", "Roll Along, Prairie Moon", "Tell Me With Your Eyes", "Wait Till You Get Them Up in the Air, Boys", "You Can't Get Away from the Blarney", and hundreds of others.

"Take Me Out to the Ball Game" was listed as number 8 on the list of Songs of the Century.

== Death ==
He resided in Beverly Hills, California. He died in Los Angeles, California.

== Work on Broadway ==
Take Me Out to the Ball Game
"Take Me Out to the Ball Game", by Jack Norworth and Albert Von Tilzer, sung by Edward Meeker for Edison Records in September 1908.

- The School Girl (1904) – musical; featured songwriter for "Lonesome"
- Ziegfeld Follies of 1908 (1908) – revue; featured composer for "You Will Have to Sing an Irish Song", "Nothing Ever Troubles Me (Nothing Ever Ever Ever Hardly Ever Troubles Me)", and "Since Mother Was a Girl"
- The Happiest Night of His Life (1911) – play; composer
- Honey Girl (1920) – musical; composer
- The Gingham Girl (1922) – musical; composer
- Adrienne (1923) – musical; composer
- Three Doors (1925) – play; producer
- Burlesque (1927) – play; featured songwriter
- Diamonds – featured songwriter
