= Watch, Hope and Wait Little Girl: I'm Coming Back to You =

"Watch, Hope, and Wait Little Girl: I'm Coming Back to You"
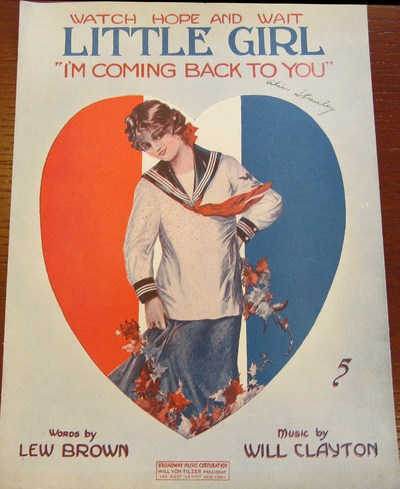

Song
- Published: October 3, 1918
- Composer(s): Will Clayton
- Lyricist(s): Lew Brown

Watch, Hope and Wait Little Girl: I'm Coming Back To You is a World War I song written by Lew Brown, and composed by Will Clayton. The song was first published in 1918 by Broadway Music Co. in New York, NY. The sheet music cover was designed by E.E. Walton, and features a young woman in a heart of red, white, and blue, flowers are gathered at her knees

It was written for voice and piano.

Initially the song was titled, "(Watch, Hope and Wait) Little Girl (Until I Come Back to You)." It was altered to the more positive title, "(Watch, Hope, and Wait) Little Girl ('I'm Coming Back to You')."

A version of the song was recorded on November 8, 1918, by tenor Charles H. Hart with conductor Josef Pasternack. It was released by Victor Records.

The lyrics' tone is positive and hopeful. A soldier is telling his girlfriend that "all the world looks bright." The war is over and he is returning home. He proclaims that "happy days" are in their near future, and even promises that wedding bells will soon ring. The chorus is as follows:

Watch, little girl, and hope, little girl,
And wait, little girl, for me;
Smile, little girl, all the while, little girl,
Though I'm across the sea.
Give my love to ma,
Say "hello" to pa;
I'm not there but, dear, I know
How overjoyed you are.
It means, little girl, that our dreams, little girl,
Are surely coming true;
We have won, little girl,
Our duty's done, little girl
I'm coming back to you.

The sheet music can be found at Pritzker Military Museum & Library.
