= Don't Take My Darling Boy Away =

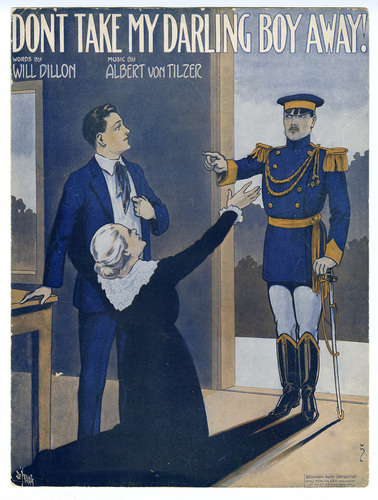

Song by André De Takacs
- Published: 1915
- Composer(s): Albert Von Tilzer
- Lyricist(s): Will Dillon
- Producer(s): Broadway Music Corporation

"Don't Take My Darling Boy Away" was a World War I era song about a mother begging a captain to not take away her son to fight. It was written by Will Dillon, composed by Albert Von Tilzer. André De Takacs designed the sheet music cover. The Broadway Music Corporation published it in New York in 1915.

== Lyrics ==
A mother was kneeling to pray For loved ones at war far away And there by her side, her one joy and pride, knelt down with her that day

Then came a knock on the door Your boy is commanded to war "No Captain please, here on my knees, I plead for one I adore"

Don't take my darling boy away from me, Don't send him off to war You took his father and brothers three, Now you've come back for more

Who are the heroes that fight your war Mothers who have no say But my duty's done so for god's sake leave one! And don't take my darling boy away

A hero is now laid to rest, A hero and one of the best She fought with each son, The battles he'd won, And the battles that proved a test

Though she never went to the war, She was a hero by far, they gave a gun But who gave a son, M. O. T. H. E. R.

REPEAT CHORUS
