= I Wonder What They're Doing To-Night (Your Girl and Mine) =

"I Wonder What They’re Doing Tonight (Your Girl and Mine)"
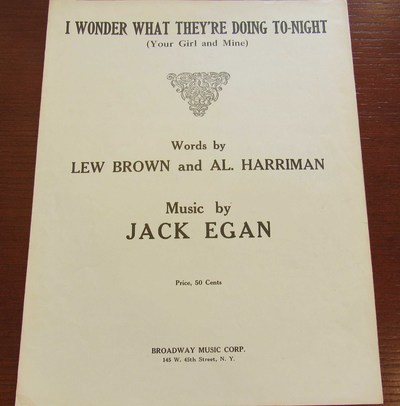
- Sheet music cover

Song
- Published: 1918
- Composer(s): John C. Egan
- Lyricist(s): Lew Brown, Al Harriman

"I Wonder What They’re Doing Tonight (Your Girl and Mine)" is a 1918 song by composer John C. Egan and lyricists Lew Brown and Al Harriman. It was published by the Broadway Music Corp. A version of the song was recorded by Arthur Fields.
