= Jim Burke (illustrator) =

American illustrator, painter, and educator (born 1973)

Jim Burke (born 1973 in Manchester, New Hampshire) is an American illustrator, painter, and educator. Burke received his BFA from Syracuse University and his MFA from the University of Hartford. Burke has lectured at Syracuse University, The Norman Rockwell Museum, and the National Baseball Hall of Fame. He formerly instructed painting and illustration at Pratt Institute, and as a visiting artist at Syracuse University. He returned to New Hampshire in the Fall of 2009, when he was appointed Chairperson of the Illustration Department at the New Hampshire Institute of Art. In Fall 2016, Burke was appointed Assistant Vice President of Academic Affairs at the Minneapolis College of Art and Design, in Minneapolis, MN.

== Publication history ==
- "When Thunder Comes: Poems for Civil Rights Leaders" written by J. Patrick Lewis, Chronicle Books, 2012
- “All Star!” Honus Wagner and the Most Famous Baseball Card Ever, written by Jane Yolen, Philomel/Penguin - 2010
- "Miss Little's Gift" written by Douglas Wood, Candlewick Books, 2009
- “Naming Liberty” written by Jane Yolen, Philomel/Penguin - 2008
- “Johnny Appleseed” written by Jane Yolen, HarperCollins - 2008
- “Take Me Out to the Ball Game” by Jim Burke, Little, Brown & Co. - 2006
- “Maggie’s Amerikay” by Barbara Timberlake Russell, Farrar, Straus Giroux - 2006
- "My Brothers' Flying Machine" by Jane Yolen, Little, Brown and Co., 2003
- "Poetry for Young People; Walt Whitman"" edited by Jonathan Levin, Sterling Publishing - 1997

== Recognition & Awards ==
- New Hampshire Union Leader's "40 Under Forty", 2013
- President's Good Steward Award, Campus Compact for New Hampshire, 2013, and 2015
- Gold Medal from the prestigious Society of Illustrators
- Platinum and Gold Oppenheim Toy Portfolio Best Book Awards
- Parent's Choice Gold Best Book Award
- Original Art Show, 6 books have received Awards of Excellence
- 6 "Starred" Book Reviews from Booklist, School Library Journal, and Publishers Weekly
- Communication Arts Award of Excellence
- Print's Regional Design Award of Excellence.
- 23 Awards of Excellence (for Illustration) Annuals 40, 42, 43, 44, 45, 46, 47, 48, 49, 50, 51 from the Society of Illustrators
- 8 Gold and Silver Medals (for Art Direction) from the Society of Illustrators

== Influences ==
- John Sloan and George Bellows of the Ash Can School
- Edward Hopper
- John Singer Sargent
- James McNeill Whistler
- Edgar Degas
- Frank Duveneck
