= You Can't Get Away from the Blarney =

1917 song written by Darl Mac Boyle and composed by Albert Von Tilzer

Song
- Published: 1917
- Composer(s): Albert Von Tilzer
- Lyricist(s): Darl Mac Boyle

"You Can't Get Away from the Blarney" is a song from 1917 by composer Albert Von Tilzer and lyricist Darl Mac Boyle. It was published by Broadway Music Corporation.

The sheet music can be found at the Pritzker Military Museum & Library.

== Bibliography ==
- Crew, Danny O. (2001). Presidential Sheet Music: An Illustrated Catalogue of Published Music Associated with the American Presidency and Those Who Sought the Office. Jefferson, North Carolina: McFarland & Company, Inc. Publishers. ISBN 0-7864-0928-2. OCLC 45313670.
