= I'm Writing to You, Sammy =

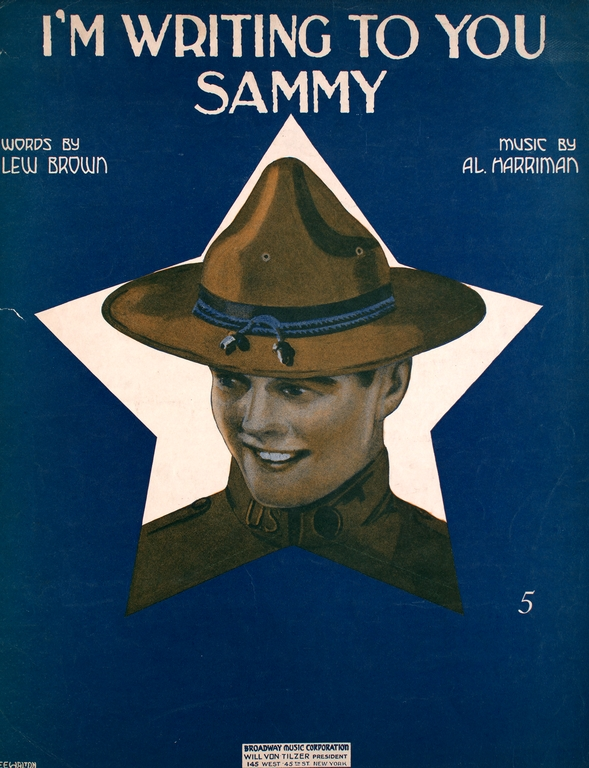

Song
- Released: 1917
- Label: Broadway Music Co.
- Songwriters: Composer: Al Harriman; Lyricist: Lew Brown

I'm Writing to You, Sammy is a World War I era song released in 1917. Lew Brown wrote the lyrics. Al Harriman composed the music. The song was published by Broadway Music Company of New York, New York. On the cover of the sheet music is a drawing of a soldier, from the shoulders up, inside of a star. Artist E.E. Walton designed the cover. The song was written for both piano and voice.

The sheet music can be found at Pritzker Military Museum & Library.

The lyrics are told from the first-person point of view of a woman who no longer hears from a soldier named Sammy. Although she continues to get letters from other soldiers, she has not heard from her Sammy. She is uncertain if he is getting her letters because, "They're calling all our soldiers by the name of Sammy too." Part of the chorus is as follows:

I'm writing to you Sammy
And you're somewhere in France
I'm writing to you Sammy
I know I'm taking a chance
Before you went away
I know I heard you say
"Don't forget to write to your Sammy,
care of the U.S.A."
But I'm beginning to wonder
If you really knew
They're calling our soldiers by the name of Sammy too
