= I May Be Gone for a Long, Long Time =

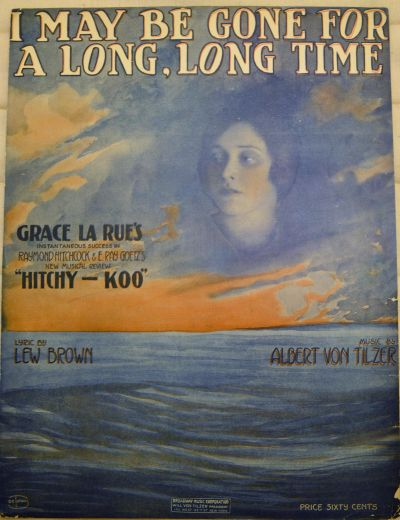
- Found at Pritzker Military Museum & Library

Song
- Released: 1917
- Label: Broadway Music Corp.
- Songwriters: Composer: Albert Von Tilzer; Lyricist: Lew Brown

"I May Be Gone for a Long, Long Time" is a World War I era song released in 1917. It was featured in the 1917 stage production of Raymond Hitchcock and E. Ray Goetz's Hitchy-Koo. Lew Brown wrote the lyrics. Albert Von Tilzer composed the music. The song was published by Broadway Music Corp. of New York, New York. André De Takacs designed the sheet music cover. It features Grace La Rue's image blended into the clouds of an ocean scene. The song was written for both voice and piano.

The song was quite popular during World War I with well-liked recordings by the Peerless Quartet and by the Shannon Four. This could be attributed to many things. Hitchy-Koo, in which the song was introduced, ran for over 220 performances in 1917. It was also performed by Grace La Rue, who was one of Broadway's most successful and popular performers of the time. The song itself had an upbeat tone that filled listeners with hope.

The lyrics are told from the point of view of a soldier who is leaving for war. He is saying goodbye to his heartbroken girlfriend, but promises that when he returns they will "build a little home for two," and begin life away from strife. His overall message to her is to keep him in her thoughts and he will do the same. The chorus is as follows:

I may be gone for a long, long time
long, long time
long, long time
But when I go, you will know that
I'll always pine for the day when you'll be mine.
Be true to me for a long, long time
rain or shine, sweetheart mine
And I'll be just as true to you
As to the Red, White, and Blue
Though I'm gone for a long, long time

The sheet music can be found at Pritzker Military Museum & Library.
