= Au Revoir But Not Good Bye, Soldier Boy =

"Au Revoir, but not Good Bye: Soldier Boy"
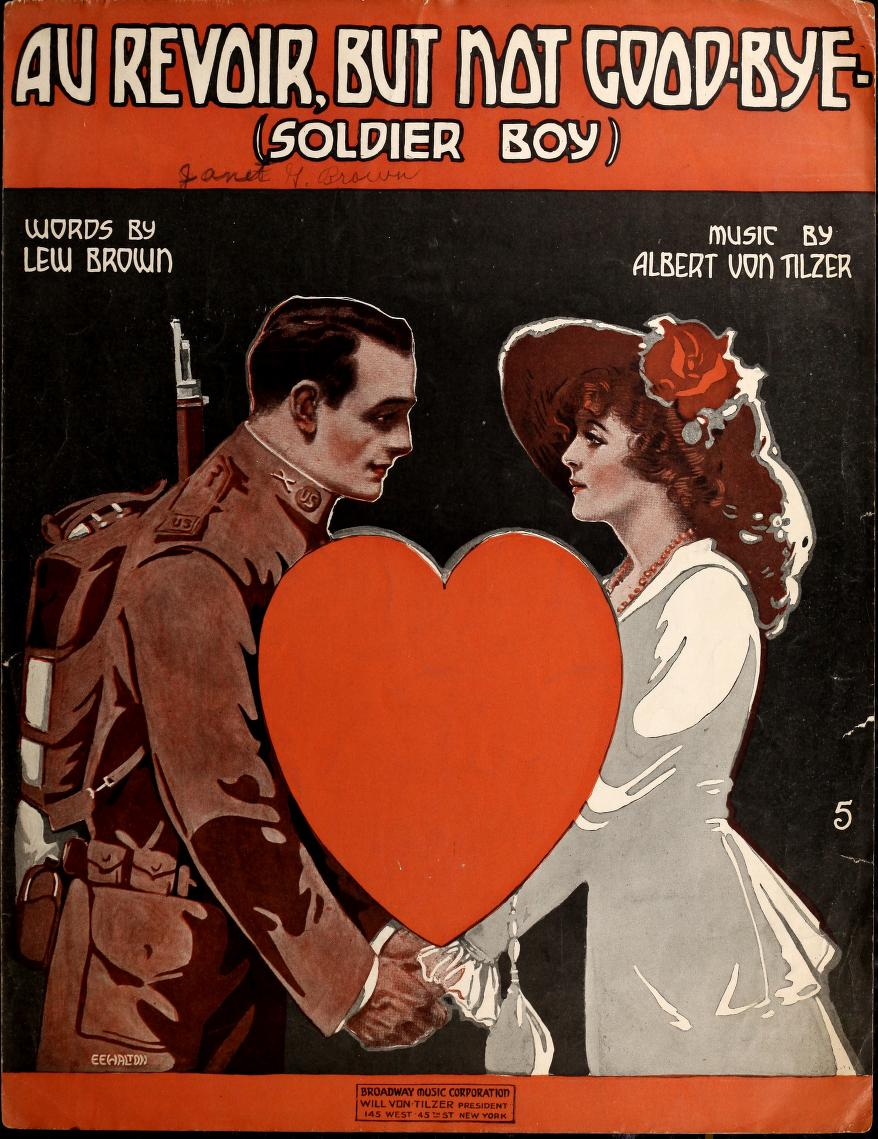
- Sheet music cover for "Au Revoir But Not Good Bye, Soldier Boy"

Song
- Published: 1917
- Composer(s): Albert von Tilzer
- Lyricist(s): Lew Brown

"Au Revoir, but not Good Bye: Soldier Boy" is a 1917 song composed by Albert von Tilzer, with lyrics written by Lew Brown.

It was performed by The Peerless Quartet. The commercial recording was recorded in 3 takes on January 15, 1918 with the 3rd take being the master recording. It was issued under the Victor label. Based on estimates of sales, the song reached #8 on the top 100 US songs of the time from the Quartet's debut of the piece on April 27, 1918.

The sheet music for this song had a cover by E. E. Walton. It was also reprinted three times.

== Analysis ==
The song is arranged for piano and vocals, and is set to a slow tempo. The lyrics are told from the point of view of a soldier's sweetheart who says farewell to him as he departs for the war. She is anxious about her lover's safety, but tells him to "never fear." The speaker tells him she will think of him while he is far away fighting for liberty.
