= Edward Meeker =

US singer and performer

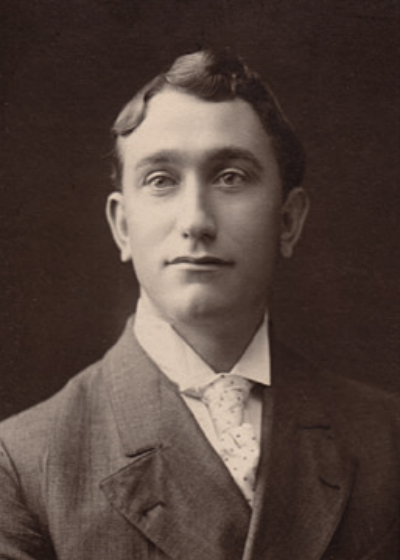
- Born: January 22, 1874; East Orange, New Jersey
- Died: April 19, 1937 (aged 63); Orange, New Jersey
- Resting place: Immaculate Conception Cemetery and Museum, Upper Montclair, New Jersey, U.S.
- Spouse: Margaret Wood Meeker
- Children: 3
- Parent(s): Enoch and Hattie Meeker

Take Me Out to the Ball Game
"Take Me Out to the Ball Game", announced and sung by Edward Meeker

Edward Meeker (January 22, 1874 – April 19, 1937) was an American singer and performer, best known for his appearances on the recordings of Thomas Edison both as an announcer and singer, performing songs such as "Chicken Reel", "Go Easy Mabel", "Harrigan" and most notably, "Take Me Out to the Ball Game". Original music by Meeker includes, "That Railroad Rag" released in 1911. Shortly before the enactment of Prohibition, in 1919, he released an anti-prohibition song, "Every Day Will Be Sunday When The Town Goes Dry".

As well as reading vaudeville skits and providing sound effects throughout the remainder of his career.

== Personal life ==
Edward Meeker married Margaret Wood Meeker in 1895.

Meeker was born in East Orange, New Jersey, on January 22, 1874, and died in Orange, New Jersey, on April 19, 1937, at the age of 63.

He had 3 children, one son and two daughters.

== In popular culture ==
Meeker's Rendition of "Take Me Out to the Ball Game" can be heard on the radio in Slender: The Arrival.

Meeker's appearance on Thomas Edison's cylinder recordings can be found on Apple Music.
