= Honey Boy (1907 song) =

Song
- Language: English
- Published: 1907
- Composer: Albert Von Tilzer
- Lyricist: Jack Norworth

"Honey Boy" is a Tin Pan Alley song for voice and piano written by Jack Norworth and composed by Albert Von Tilzer. The song was first published in 1907 by The York Music Co. in New York, NY.

The sheet music can be found at the Pritzker Military Museum & Library.
