= Mike Shropshire =

American sportswriter (born 1942)

Mike Shropshire (May 22, 1942-Sept. 24, 2026) was an American sportswriter. Born Michael Tyne Shropshire, he graduated from the University of Texas and started as a reporter for the Fort Worth Press in the 1960s. He wrote for various publications throughout his career, including the Fort Worth Star-Telegram, The Dallas Morning News, D Magazine, Playboy, and Sports Illustrated. He has also authored nine books, including Seasons in Hell, an account of his tenure writing about the Texas Rangers baseball franchise during its early years. He died Sept. 24, 2026, at age 84 of natural causes.

== Critical reception ==
Esquire listed Seasons in Hell as one of the 20 best baseball books of all time, in 2013.

== Books ==
- Seasons In Hell (1996), ISBN 0-8032-9277-5
- The Ice Bowl: The Green Bay Packers and Dallas Cowboys Season of 1967 (1997) ISBN 978-1-556-11532-5
- The Pro: A Golf Novel (2001), ISBN 978-0-312-24231-2
- When The Tuna Went Down to Texas (2004), ISBN 0-06-057212-4
- Runnin' With The Big Dogs (2006), ISBN 0-06-085279-8
- The Last Real Season (2008), ISBN 0-446-40154-4
