= Take Me Out to the Ball Game =

Song by Albert von Tilzer

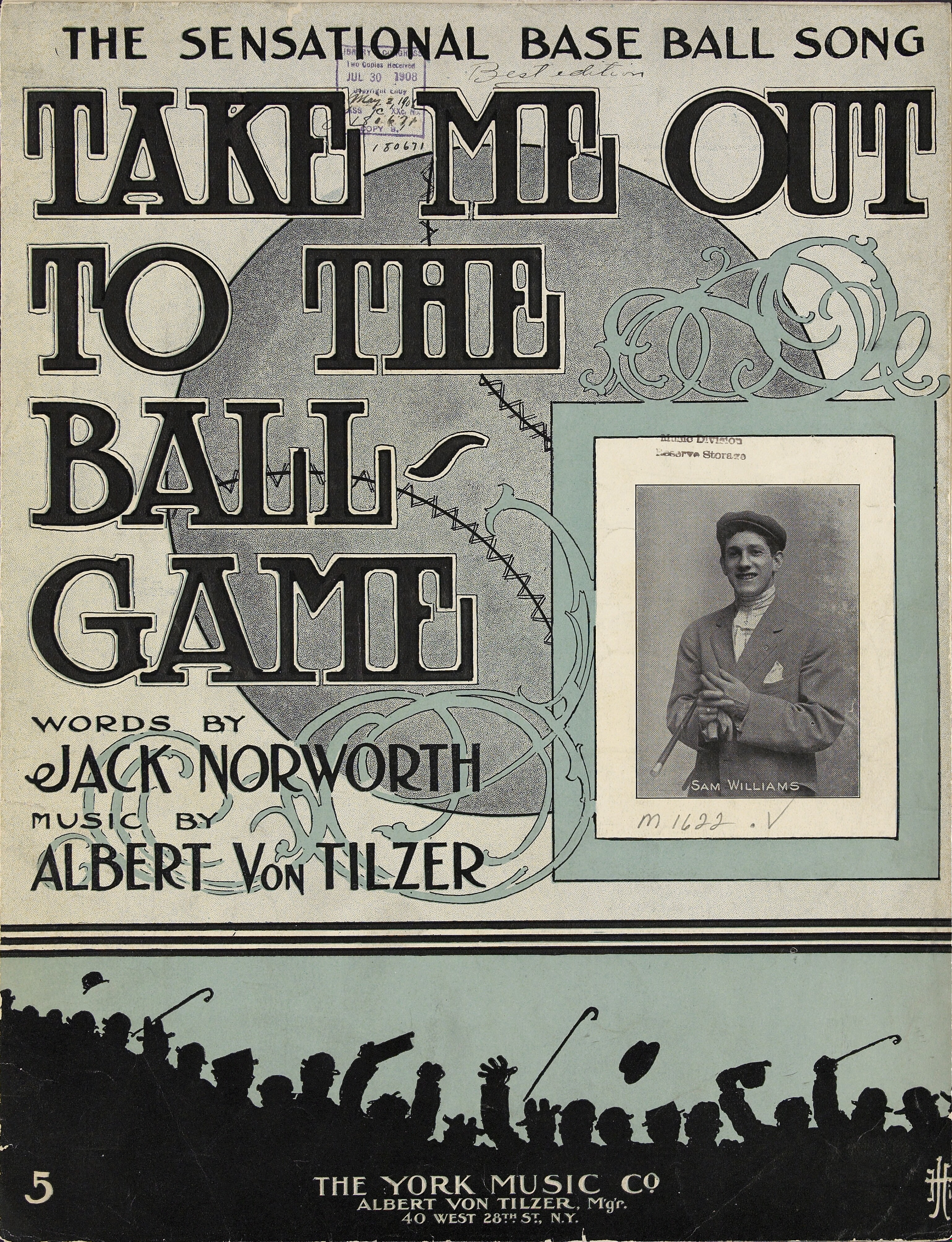

Song
- Language: English
- Published: 1908 by York Music
- Genre: Waltz
- Composer: Albert Von Tilzer
- Lyricist: Jack Norworth

Audio
- This, the original version of the song, was sung by Edward Meeker in 1908, and is one of the first ever recordings of the song.: file; help
- Typical modern ball park instrumental version performed by Kaila Rochelle on a Roland GR-09 organ with a Roland RD-700 keyboard midi controller. The performance is of the chorus.: file; help

"Take Me Out to the Ball Game" is a 1908 waltz song by Jack Norworth and Albert Von Tilzer which has become the unofficial anthem of North American baseball, although neither of its authors had attended a game before writing the song. The song's chorus is traditionally sung as part of the seventh-inning stretch of a baseball game. Fans are generally encouraged to sing along, and at many ballparks, the words "home team" are replaced with the team name.

"Take Me Out to the Ball Game" is one of the three-most recognizable songs in the US, along with "The Star-Spangled Banner" and "Happy Birthday." However, most people are only familiar with the chorus. The verses of the song likely failed to gain popularity due to being in third person.

== History ==
Jack Norworth, while riding a subway train, was inspired by a sign that said "Baseball Today – Polo Grounds". In the song, Katie's (and later Nelly's) beau calls to ask her out to see a show. She accepts the date, but only if her date will take her out to the baseball game. The words were set to music by Albert Von Tilzer. (Norworth and Von Tilzer finally saw their first Major League Baseball games 32 and 20 years later, respectively.) The song was first sung by Norworth's wife Nora Bayes and popularized by many other vaudeville acts. It was played at a ballpark for the first known time in 1934, at a high school game in Los Angeles; it was played later that year during the fourth game of the 1934 World Series.

Norworth wrote an alternative version of the song in 1927. (Norworth and Bayes were famous for writing and performing such smash hits as "Shine On, Harvest Moon".) With the sale of so many records, sheet music, and piano rolls, the song became one of the most popular hits of 1908. The Haydn Quartet singing group, led by popular tenor Harry MacDonough, recorded a successful version on Victor Records.

Its use became popularized by Harry Caray, the announcer of the Chicago White Sox, when he began singing it during the seventh-inning stretch in 1976. He continued the tradition when he became the announcer for the Chicago Cubs in 1982 and games were nationally broadcast.

The most famous recording of the song was credited to "Billy Murray and the Haydn Quartet", even though Murray did not sing on it. The confusion, nonetheless, is so pervasive that, when "Take Me Out to the Ball Game" was selected by the National Endowment for the Arts and the Recording Industry Association of America as one of the 365 top "Songs of the Century", the song was credited to Billy Murray, implying his recording of it as having received the most votes among songs from the first decade. The first recorded version was by Edward Meeker. Meeker's recording was selected by the Library of Congress as a 2010 addition to the National Recording Registry, which selects recordings annually that are "culturally, historically, or aesthetically significant".

== Lyrics ==
Below are the lyrics of the 1908 version, which is out of copyright.

Katie Casey was baseball mad,
Had the fever and had it bad.
Just to root for the home town crew,
Ev'ry sou (Note: The term sou, a coin of French origin, was at the time common slang for a low-denomination coin. In French the expression sans le sou has the meaning of being penniless. Carly Simon's version, produced for Ken Burns' 1994 documentary, Baseball, reads "Ev'ry cent/Katie spent".)
Katie blew.
On a Saturday her young beau
Called to see if she'd like to go
To see a show, but Miss Kate said "No,
I'll tell you what you can do:"

Chorus

Take me out to the ball game,
Take me out with the crowd;
Buy me some peanuts and Cracker Jack,
I don't care if I never get back.
Let me root, root, root for the home team
If they don't win, it's a shame.
For it's one, two, three strikes, you're out,
At the old ball game.

Katie Casey saw all the games,
Knew the players by their first names.
Told the umpire he was wrong,
All along,
Good and strong.
When the score was just two to two,
Katie Casey knew what to do,
Just to cheer up the boys she knew,
She made the gang sing this song:

— Take Me Out to the Ball Game, 1908 version

== Recordings ==
The song (or at least its chorus) has been recorded or cited countless times since it was written. The original music and 1908 lyrics of the song are now in the public domain in the United States (worldwide copyright remains until 70 years after the composers' deaths). The copyright to the revised 1927 lyrics entered the public domain in the United States on January 1, 2023. It has been used as an instrumental underscore or introduction to many films or skits having to do with baseball.

The first verse of the 1927 version is sung by Dan Hornsby for Columbia Records 1544-D (148277). The Hoosier Hot Shots recorded the song in 1936. Gene Kelly and Frank Sinatra at the start of the MGM musical film, Take Me Out to the Ball Game (1949), a movie that also features a song about the famous and fictitious double play combination, O'Brien to Ryan to Goldberg.

In the mid-1980s, the Kidsongs Kids recorded an adaptation of this song for A Day at Old MacDonald's Farm.

In the mid-1990s, a Major League Baseball ad campaign featured versions of the song performed by musicians of several different genres. An alternative rock version by the Goo Goo Dolls was also recorded. Multiple genre Louisiana singer-songwriter Dr. John and pop singer Carly Simon both recorded different versions of the song for the PBS documentary series Baseball, by Ken Burns.

In 2001, Nike aired a commercial featuring a diverse group of Major League Baseball players singing lines of the song in their native languages. The players and languages featured were Ken Griffey Jr. (American English), Alex Rodriguez (Caribbean Spanish), Chan Ho Park (Korean), Kazuhiro Sasaki (Japanese), Graeme Lloyd (Australian English), Éric Gagné (Québécois French), Andruw Jones (Dutch), John Franco (Italian), Iván Rodríguez (Caribbean Spanish), and Mark McGwire (American English).

== In popular culture ==
The iconic song has been used and alluded to in many different ways since its inception.

- In A Night at the Opera (1935), Harpo and Chico Marx disrupt an opera performance by surreptitiously distributing the sheet music for the song to the orchestra.
- The sketch Who's On First by Abbott and Costello starts with Abbott briefly singing the song.
- In 1949 a musical comedy Technicolor film with the same name was produced by MGM. It stars Frank Sinatra, Esther Williams, Gene Kelly, and was directed by Busby Berkeley. The song is featured in the film, performed by Gene Kelly and Frank Sinatra, reprise by Esther Williams.
- The 2001 children's book Take Me Out of the Bathtub and other Silly Dilly Songs by Alan Katz and David Catrow, featuring silly words to well-known tunes, recast the end of the chorus as "I used one, two, three bars of soap; take me out, I'm clean!" in its title number.
- In 2002, as a bonus feature in the video game MLB Slugfest 2003, nu metal band Dry Kill Logic recorded an original song (alongside an accompanying music video) for the game entitled "Riot at the Bat Rack", which is loosely based on "Take Me Out to the Ball Game".
- In 2006, Jim Burke authored and illustrated a children's book version of "Take Me Out to the Ballgame".
- In 2008, Andy Strasberg, Bob Thompson and Tim Wiles (from the Baseball Hall of Fame) wrote a comprehensive book on the history of the song, Baseball's Greatest Hit: The Story of 'Take Me Out to the Ball Game'. The book, published by Hal Leonard Books, included a CD with 16 different recordings of the song from various points in time, ranging from a 1908 recording by Fred Lambert, to a seventh-inning-stretch recording by Harry Caray.
- Also in 2008, a parody of "Take Me Out to the Ball Game" was sung during an episode of the third season of the American game show Deal or No Deal on NBC. The contestant of that episode, Garrett Smith, was a baseball aficionado and a proud Atlanta Braves fan who even hoped to play for the team as a catcher. However, the lyrics were changed to lyrics that showed disdain for Smith, as this was a song that was penned by the Banker who then encouraged the in-studio audience to sing it to him.
- From March 13, 2015, the tune of "Take Me Out to the Ball Game" was adopted as the departure melody for trains on the Tokyo Metro Namboku Line at Kōrakuen Station in Tokyo, Japan. Baseball is popular in Japan, and Korakuen Station is one of the closest stations to the Tokyo Dome baseball stadium.
- In September 2016, the Miami Marlins paid tribute to the pitcher José Fernández, who had died in a boating accident earlier that month, with a trumpet rendition during a pregame ceremony.
- In October 2016, actor Bill Murray, a Chicago Cubs fan, impersonated Daffy Duck as he gave his rendition of the chorus of 'Take Me Out To The Ball Game' while at game 3 of the 2016 World Series, held at Wrigley Field.
- The piece for narrator and orchestra Lifting the Curse with music by Julian Wachner and spoken text by Bill Littlefield extensively quotes the song in full orchestral array. It has been recorded on CD with The Landmarks Orchestra (Boston), Littlefield narrating.
- In 2019, after the Hartford Yard Goats minor league baseball team banned peanuts at Dunkin' Park due to allergy concerns, the club announced a contest for fans to come up with new, nut-free lyrics to replace "Buy me some peanuts and Cracker Jack." The winning lyric, "Buy me a hot dog and Yard Goats cap", has been sung at home games ever since.
- In August 2025, the Sesame Street Muppets covered the song on the Sesame Street YouTube channel.
- Prior to the NWSL's Chicago Red Stars game against Bay FC at Wrigley Field on June 8, 2024, the Red Stars created a promotional video at the stadium featuring a modified version of the song that referenced soccer instead of baseball. The video also honored Katie Casey, the original subject of the song.

== Recognition and awards ==
- 2008: The song won the Songwriters Hall of Fame Towering Song Award
