= Whoopee! (film) =

1930 film by Thornton Freeland

Whoopee
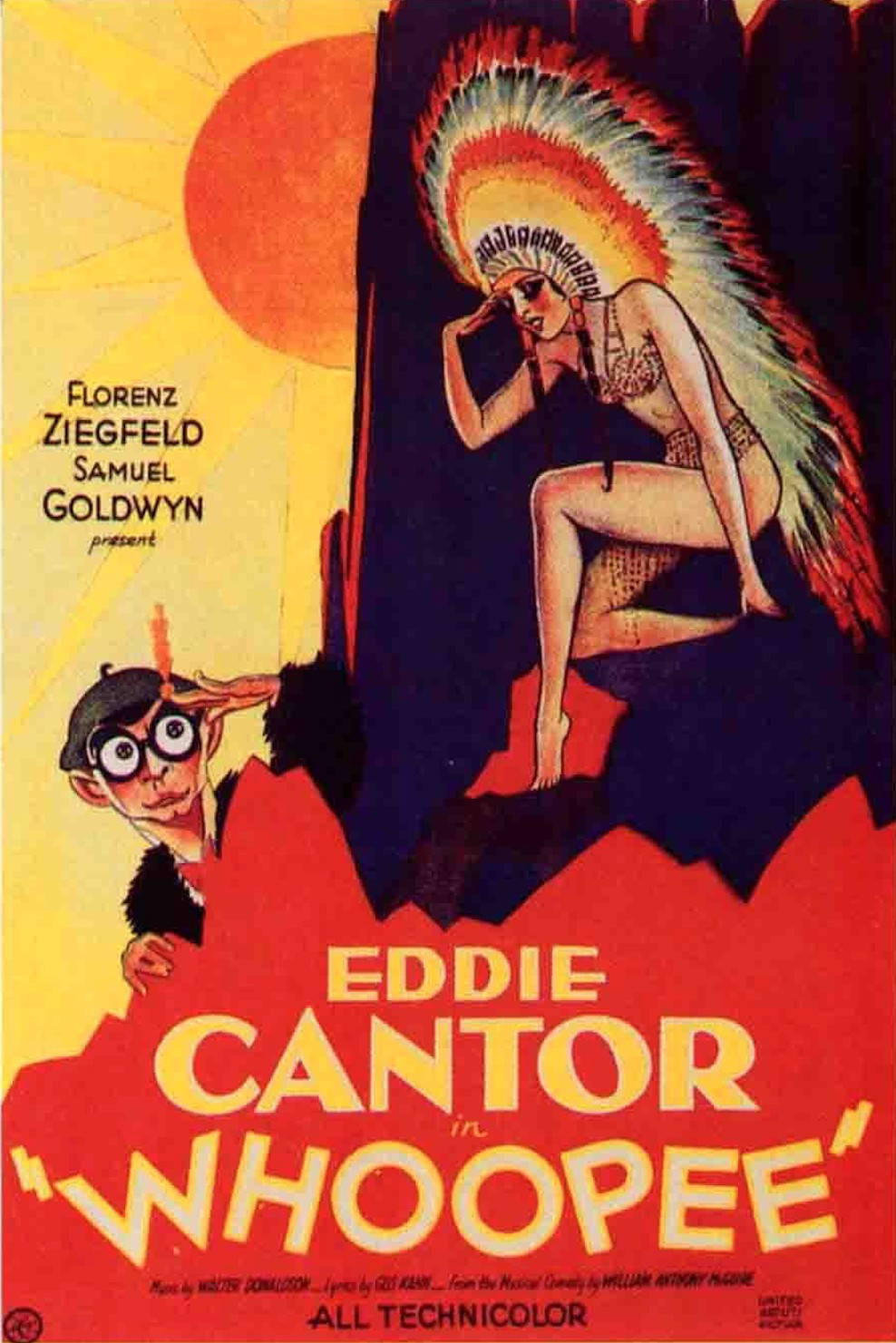
- Theatrical release poster
- Directed by: Thornton Freeland
- Written by: William M. Conselman; E.J. Rath (story); Robert Hobart Davis (story); Owen Davis (play); William Anthony McGuire (musical)
- Produced by: Samuel Goldwyn; Florenz Ziegfeld
- Starring: Eddie Cantor; Ethel Shutta; Eleanor Hunt
- Cinematography: Lee Garmes; Ray Rennahan; Gregg Toland
- Edited by: Stuart Heisler
- Music by: Nacio Herb Brown; Walter Donaldson; Edward Eliscu
- Color process: Two-color Technicolor
- Production company: Samuel Goldwyn Productions
- Distributed by: United Artists
- Release date: September 30, 1930
- Running time: 101 minutes
- Country: United States
- Language: English
- Budget: $1.9 million
- Box office: $2,655,000

Whoopee! is a 1930 American pre-Code comedy musical Western film photographed in two-color Technicolor. It was directed by Thornton Freeland and stars Eddie Cantor, Ethel Shutta and Eleanor Hunt. The film's plot closely follows that of the 1928 stage show produced by Florenz Ziegfeld. The Walter Donaldson song "My Baby Just Cares for Me" was introduced in the film version of Whoopee!.

== Plot ==
Whoopee! (1930)

Sally Morgan loves an Indian named Wanenis, but her father forbids her to marry Wanenis, instead favoring sheriff Bob Wells. Just before marrying Wells, Sally decides that she loves Wanenis too much and tricks farmhand Henry Williams into helping her flee to the ranch of Jerome Underwood. Wells searches for Sally, causing trouble for the oblivious Henry.

== Cast ==
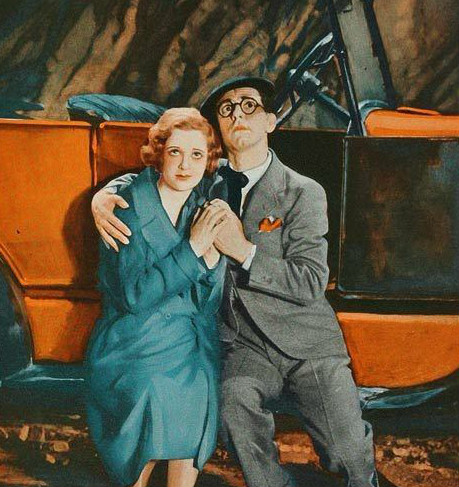
Illustration of a scene from the film

- Eddie Cantor as Henry Williams
- Ethel Shutta as Mary Custer
- Paul Gregory as Wanenis
- Eleanor Hunt as Sally Morgan
- Jack Rutherford as Sheriff Bob Wells
- Walter Law as Jud Morgan
- Spencer Charters as Jerome Underwood
- Albert Hackett as Chester Underwood
- Marian Marsh as Harriett Underwood

== Production ==
Whoopee! made a film star of Eddie Cantor, already known for his work on the Broadway stage and as a singer. The song "My Baby Just Cares for Me" was written especially for Cantor to sing in the film and became one of his signature songs. Bandleader George Olsen, already a well-known Victor recording artist, repeated his work from the stage version.

The film launched the Hollywood career of Busby Berkeley and was Alfred Newman's first composing job in Hollywood. Richard Day designed the sets and the cinematographer was Gregg Toland, who later found fame through his work in the films of Orson Welles. H. Bruce "Lucky" Humberstone served in an uncredited role as assistant director.

Future stars Betty Grable, Paulette Goddard, Ann Sothern, Virginia Bruce and Claire Dodd appear uncredited as "Goldwyn Girls".

== Awards ==
The film was nominated for an Academy Award for Best Art Direction by Richard Day.

== Reception ==
The film has been called a "a musical western extravaganza". Cecil A. Smith and Glenn Litton recalled that "Director Frank Corsaro was criticized for exaggerating the show's dramatic style.".

== See also ==
- List of early color feature films
