= Kid Boots (film) =

1926 film by Frank Tuttle

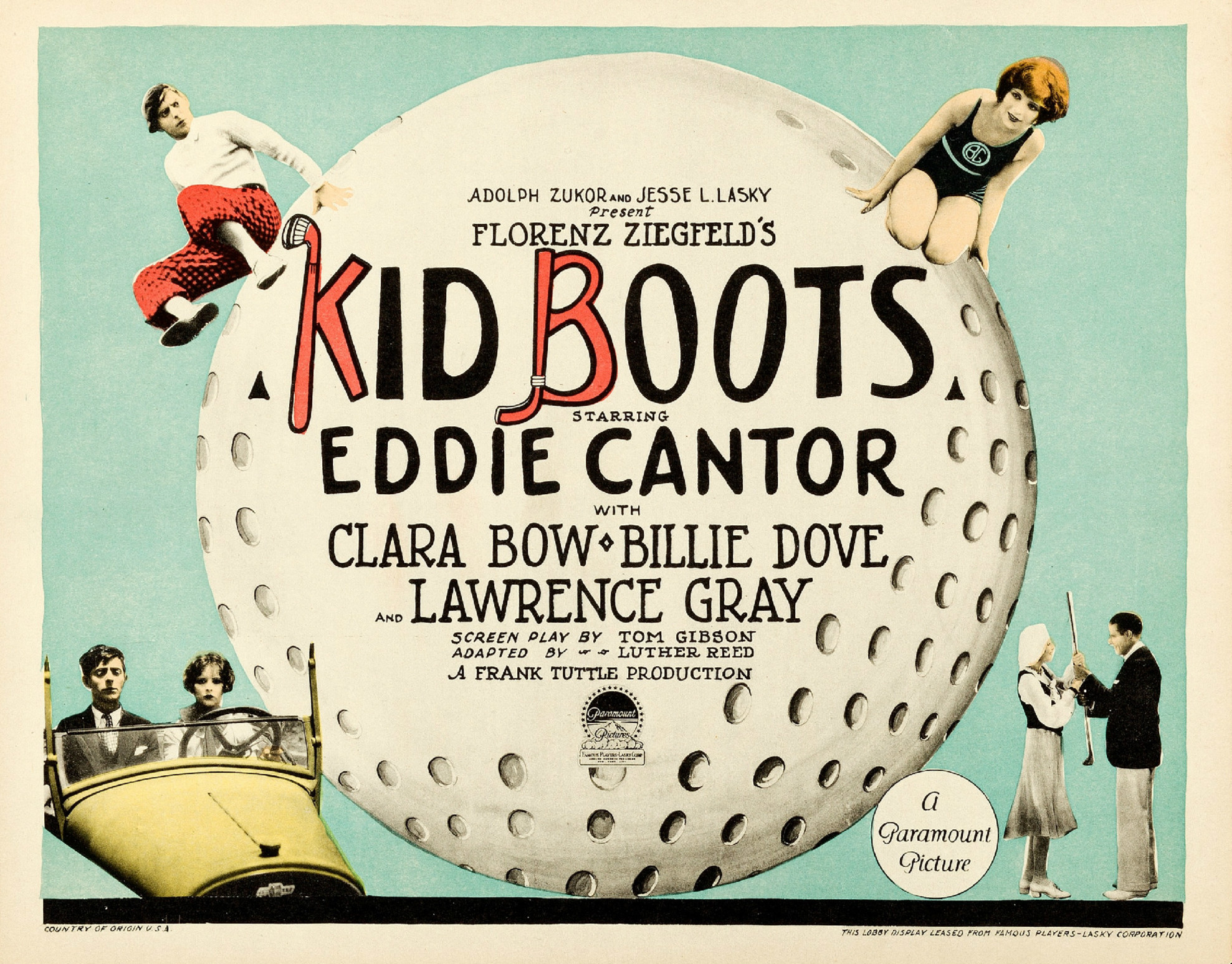
- Lobby card
- Directed by: Frank Tuttle
- Written by: Luther Reed (adaptation); Tom Gibson (screenplay); George Marion Jr. (titles)
- Based on: Kid Boots by William Anthony McGuire and Otto Harbach
- Produced by: Adolph Zukor; Jesse L. Lasky
- Starring: Eddie Cantor; Clara Bow
- Cinematography: Victor Milner
- Production company: Famous Players–Lasky
- Distributed by: Paramount Pictures
- Release date: October 4, 1926
- Running time: 9 reels
- Country: United States
- Language: Silent (English intertitles)

Kid Boots (1926)

Kid Boots is a 1926 American silent comedy film directed by Frank Tuttle, and based on the 1923 musical written by William Anthony McGuire and Otto Harbach. This was entertainer Eddie Cantor's first film. A print is preserved at the Library of Congress.

== Plot ==
Kid Boots is a put-upon clerk in a men's tailor shop. When Big Boyle storms in to buy a new suit, the service he receives is so inept that he destroys the shop trying to throttle Boots.

Boots flees for his life, stopping only to make Clara McCoy's acquaintance. Attempting to hide in a hotel, Boots becomes an accidental witness to the infidelity of a rich man's wife. The rich man, Tom Sterling, has a $100,000.00 settlement suit at stake. So he keeps Boots close to him as a character witness.

Boots and his new friend lie low at a posh golf resort, and all is well until it is discovered Clara McCoy and the bullying Big Boyle also work there. Big Boyle eventually subjects Boots to a brutal massage and electroshock treatments. Boots escapes only when the bully laughs so hard he accidentally sits in his own electric chair.

Boots oversleeps the day of the important divorce hearing. The only way to reach the courthouse on time is on horseback. McCoy follows Boots, and the jealous Big Boyle follows her. This results in a hair-raising stunt chase where the characters take turn dangling from precipices and swaying on teeter-totters.

Boots ends up parachuting onto the courthouse roof, arriving just in time to deliver his vital testimony.

== Cast ==
- Eddie Cantor as Samuel (Kid) Boots
- Clara Bow as Clara McCoy
- Billie Dove as Eleanor Belmore
- Lawrence Gray as Tom Sterling
- Natalie Kingston as Carmen Mendoza
- Malcolm Waite as Big Boyle
- William Worthington as Eleanor's Father
- Harry von Meter as Eleanor's Lawyer
- Fred Esmelton as Tom's Lawyer
- Aud Cruster (uncredited)
- William Orlamond as Tailor (uncredited)
- Rolfe Sedan as Physical Therapist (uncredited)

== See also ==
- A Few Moments With Eddie Cantor, Star of "Kid Boots" (1924) short film made in the sound-on-film Phonofilm process, with Cantor performing an excerpt of Kid Boots
