= Roy Bargy =

American composer and pianist (1894–1974)

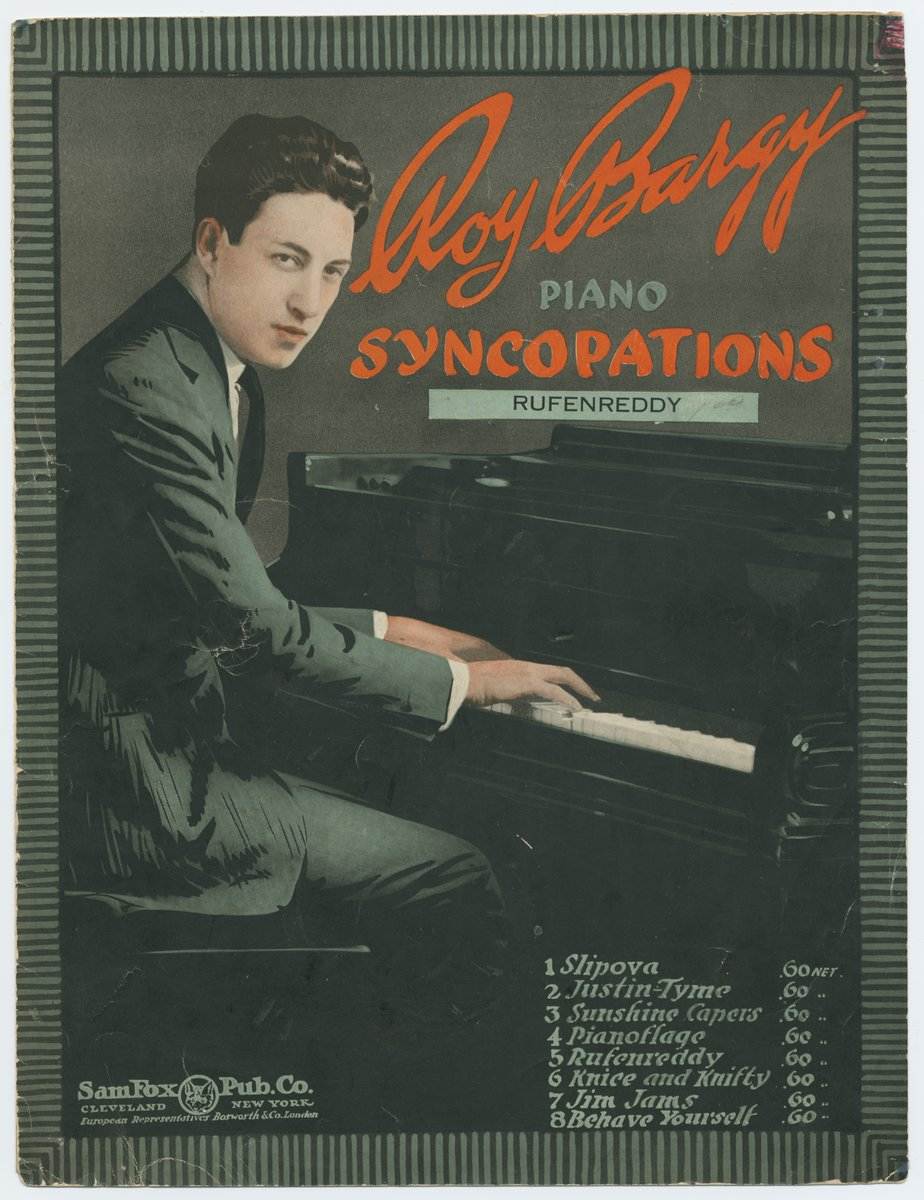
- Bargy in 1922

Background information
- Born: Roy Fredrick Bargy; July 31, 1894; Newaygo, Michigan, U.S.
- Died: January 16, 1974 (aged 79) Vista, California, U.S.
- Occupations: Composer, musician
- Instrument: Piano

Roy Fredrick Bargy (July 31, 1894 – January 16, 1974) was an American composer and pianist.

== Biography ==
Born in Newaygo, Michigan, he grew up in Toledo, Ohio. In 1919, he began working with Charley Straight at the Imperial Piano Roll Company in Chicago, performing, arranging and composing. He was the leader, pianist and arranger of the Benson Orchestra of Chicago from 1920 to 1922 (when he was replaced by Don Bestor), and later worked with the orchestras of Isham Jones and Paul Whiteman, and recorded piano solos for Victor Records. In 1928, he was the first pianist to record George Gershwin's Piano Concerto in F (in an arrangement by Ferde Grofé; with Paul Whiteman and his Concert Orchestra).

From 1943 until his retirement, he was music director for Jimmy Durante.

He died in Vista, California at the age of 79.

== Selected Compositions ==
- Ditto (1920)
- Omeomy (1920)
- Slipova (1920)
- A Blue Streak (1921)
- Knice and Knifty (with Charley Straight, 1921)
- Rufenreddy (with Charley Straight, 1921)
- Behave Yourself (1922)
- Jim Jams, No. 7 from Piano Syncopations (1922)
- Justin-Tyme (1922)
- Pianoflage (1922)
- Sunshine Capers (1922)
- Sweet And Tender (1923)
- Feeding The Kitty (1924)
- Get Lucky (1924)
- Trouble In Thirds (1925)

== See also ==
- List of ragtime composers
