= Kid Boots =

- Sheet music cover (cropped)
- Music: Harry Tierney
- Lyrics: Joseph McCarthy
- Book: William Anthony McGuire and Otto Harbach
- Productions: 1923 Broadway

Kid Boots is a musical with a book by William Anthony McGuire and Otto Harbach, music by Harry Tierney, and lyrics by Joseph McCarthy. The show was staged by Edward Royce.

Produced by Florenz Ziegfeld, the Broadway production, opened on December 31, 1923 at the Earl Carroll Theatre and then moved to the Selwyn Theatre, where it ended on February 21, 1925, for a total of 489 performances. The cast starred Eddie Cantor and Mary Eaton, with George Olsen and his orchestra.

The show was billed as “A Musical Comedy of Palm Beach and Golf” and was set at the Everglades Club in Palm Beach, Florida. It was a showcase for Eddie Cantor, who played the caddie master at the swank club. He gives golf lessons on the side, with crooked balls so the clients need more instruction. He's also a bootlegger and a busybody. He can't be fired, however, because he has something on everyone at the club. The most famous song to come out of the show was “Dinah” by Sam M. Lewis, Joe Young and Harry Akst, added to the finale during the run for Eddie. The song later gave vocalist Dinah Shore, discovered by Eddie Cantor in 1940, her stage name and the theme song for her long running radio and television shows.

The New York Times reported that on closing night, "[j]ust before the finale, George Olsen's band marched down the aisle and serenaded the company, ending with 'Auld Lang Syne.' "

== Film versions ==
During the run in New York City, inventor Lee DeForest filmed Cantor in the DeForest Phonofilm sound-on-film process, in a short film known as A Few Moments With Eddie Cantor, Star of "Kid Boots". In 1926, Paramount Pictures released a feature film version directed by Frank Tuttle, and starring Cantor, Clara Bow, and Billie Dove.

== Songs ==
Act I

- "A Day at the Club"
- "The Social Observer"
- "When Your Heart's in the Game"
- "Keep Your Eye on the Ball"
- "The Same Old Way"
- "Someone Loves You after All (The Rain Song)"
- "The Intruder Dance"
- "We've Got to Have More"
- "Polly Put the Kettle On"
- "Let's Do and Say We Didn't (Let's Don't and Say We Did)"
- "In the Swim at Miami"
- "Along the Old Lake Trail"
- "On With the Game"

Act II

- "(Since Ma Is Playing) Mah Jong" (by Billy Rose and Con Conrad)
- "Bet on the One You Fancy"
- "I'm In My Glory"
- "Play Fair, Man!"
- "Win for Me"
- "The Cake Eater's Ball"
- "Down 'Round the 19th Hole"
- "En Route"
- "When the Cocoanuts Call"
- "In the Rough"
- "That’s All There Is"

Also interpolated into the show:

- "If You Do What You Do" (by Roy Turk, Lou Handman and Eddie Cantor)
- "He’s the Hottest Man in Town" (by Owen Murphy and Jay Gorney)
- "Alabamy Bound" (words by Bud DeSylva and Bud Green, music by Ray Henderson)
- "Dinah" (by Sam M. Lewis, Joe Young and Harry Akst)

== See also ==
- A Few Moments With Eddie Cantor, Star of "Kid Boots" (1923) short film made in the sound-on-film Phonofilm process, with Cantor performing an excerpt of Kid Boots
