= The Varsity Drag =

1927 popular song

Song by George Olsen and His Orchestra (with Fran Frey) and Ruth Etting)
- B-side: "Good News"
- Released: 1927
- Genre: Pop, foxtrot
- Label: Victor
- Songwriters: Ray Henderson; Buddy DeSylva; Lew Brown

"The Varsity Drag" is a pop song written by Ray Henderson (music), Buddy DeSylva and Lew Brown (words), which became known in 1927.

The song was written for the musical Good News, from which the song "The Best Things in Life Are Free" also came. The musical premiered on September 6, 1927, at the Chanin's 46th Street Theater (now the Richard Rodgers Theater) in New York. The show had "The Varsity Drag" performed as the final number with a Charleston-like dance choreography. The number was used in the musical when Zelma O'Neal told the other students, "Let the professors worry about their dusty old books, we'll make Tait famous for the Varsity Drag." The dance is introduced in the chorus of the song, starting with the lines:

Down with the heels, up on the toes,

Stay after school, see how it goes.

That's the way to do the varsity drag.

The discographer Tom Lord lists a total of 76 recorded versions of "The Varsity Drag" (as of 2016). Most notable are the original recordings from George Olsen (with vocal by Fran Frey) and Ruth Etting, as well as later versions by Benny Goodman, Patti Page, Spike Jones and His City Slickers, Tito Puente, and the Pasadena Roof Orchestra.

The song was also used in the film adaptations of Good News from 1930 and 1947, as well as in the 1949 film musical You're My Everything. It is sung by Peter O’Toole in the 1972 British satire film The Ruling Class.
