= Ethel Shutta =

American actress and singer (1896–1976)

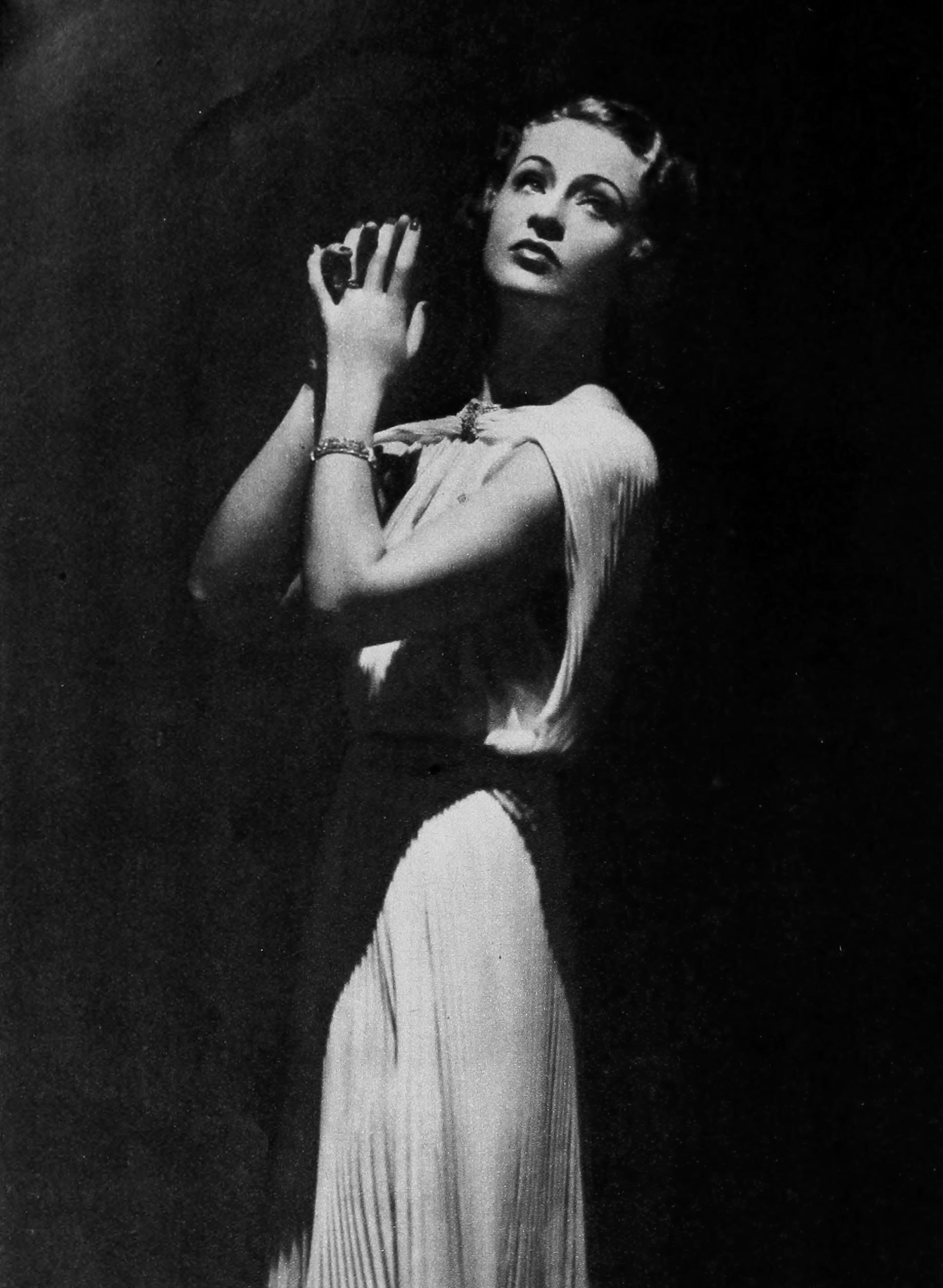
- Ethel Shutta (1936), aged 39
- Born: December 1, 1896; New York City, New York, U.S.
- Died: February 5, 1976 (aged 79); New York City, New York, U.S.
- Occupations: Actress, singer
- Spouse(s): George Olsen (1926–1939; divorced); 2 children
- Musical career
- Instrument: Vocals
- Years active: 1922–1973

Ethel Shutta (pronounced "shoo-TAY"; December 1, 1896 – February 5, 1976) was an American actress and singer, who came to prominence through her performances on Jack Benny's radio show, her role in the early Eddie Cantor musical Whoopee!, and her Broadway comeback in Follies at the age of 74. In a 1934 vote held by Radio Stars, she came in second place, behind Annette Hanshaw, as the best "female popular singer."

== Career ==
By age seven, she was known as "the little girl with the big voice". She and her family toured as the Pee Wee Minstrels. Their family name was originally Schutte. The father, Charles, was the manager. They also played in vaudeville as The Three Shuttas. She debuted on Broadway in The Passing Show of 1922, and then in a series of Florenz Ziegfeld productions including Louie the 14th (1925) and Whoopee! (1928).

Shutta married band leader George Olsen in 1926, and the couple appeared in clubs across the country. They appeared on the Jack Benny Canada Dry Radio Show, which debuted in 1932 on NBC radio. Her rendition of the song Rock-a-Bye Moon became Benny's theme song.

In 1933, Shutta was featured on the Nestle Chocolateers program. A review in the October 1933 issue of Radio Fan-Fare magazine described Shutta as "a foolproof radio attraction. She knows how to sing songs, and she knows how to sell 'em." She and Olsen were heard on the Oldsmobile Program on CBS radio in 1933.

Shutta continued to work on her own as a singer after her 1939 divorce from Olsen. Shutta married George Kirksey in 1940; they divorced in 1957. Kirksey was a sports writer and helped bring major league baseball to Houston, Texas.

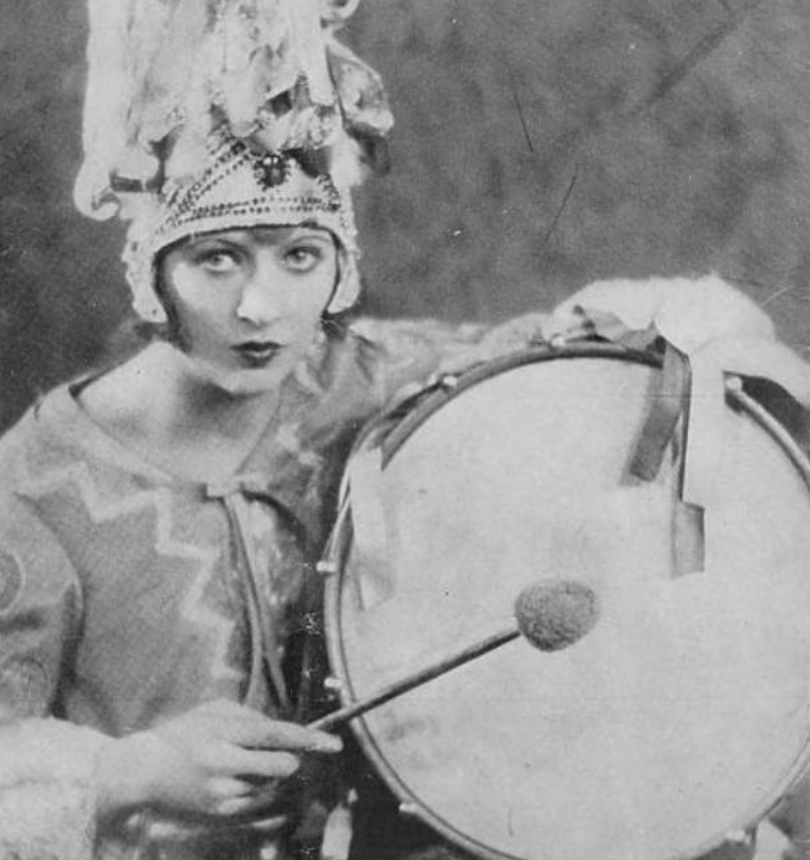
Ethel Shutta, from a 1925 publication

She returned to Broadway in October 1963 in the short-lived musical Jennie, which starred Mary Martin. The show ran 84 performances and was not a success with critics or at the box office.

Her final comeback was at the age of 73 in the original Broadway production of the musical Follies (1971–72) with music and lyrics by Stephen Sondheim. She played the role of veteran actress Hattie Walker, and sang "Broadway Baby" in which her character reminisces about her younger days as a chorus girl in the Follies.

Steven Suskin wrote: "The actresses in the three critical supporting roles were unforgettable ... Many people have sung "Broadway Baby" over the years, but I don't think anyone has ever been out there "walking off her tired feet" like the 74-year-old Shutta." Follies was staged at the Winter Garden Theater where Shutta made her first Broadway appearance in September 1922, in The Passing Show Of 1922.

== Personal life ==
In 1926 she married George Olsen, with whom she had two children, Charles (who became a theater director) and George (her son George attended school with Hal Prince, who was later to cast her in Follies). Shutta sued for divorce in 1938, stating that Olsen had deserted her as of June 10, 1937. According to The New York Times, the divorce was granted in March 1939.

Olsen opened a restaurant in New Jersey that used his own recordings as background music. According to John S. Wilson in The New York Times, Olsen had a restaurant in Paramus, NJ called "George Olsen's". Wilson noted that "Olsen is there every day greeting guests at lunch and dinner... In the background, the original George Olsen records of the Twenties play softly.

== Death ==
Shutta died in February 1976 in New York City in St. Clare's Hospital at the age of 79. She resided in Greenwich Village.

== Work ==
Broadway

- The Passing Show of 1922 (1922)
- Marjorie (1924)
- Ziegfeld Follies (1924–1925)
- Louie the 14th (1925)
- Whoopee! (1928)
- Jennie (1963)
- Follies (1971)
- Sondheim: A Musical Tribute (1973)

Film

- Whoopee! (1930) - Mary Custer
- The Playground (1965) - Mrs. Cartwright

Radio

- The Canada Dry Ginger Ale Program, a forerunner of The Jack Benny Show (1932)

Television

- Wagon Train (1958-1960) - Mrs. Parker / Mrs. Foster's Friend / Mildred Anderson / Woman

== Sources ==
- Ted Chapin, Everything Was Possible: The Birth of the Musical Follies, Alfred A. Knopf, New York, 2003 (ISBN 0-375-41328-6)
