= Sidney Franklin (bullfighter) =

American bullfighter

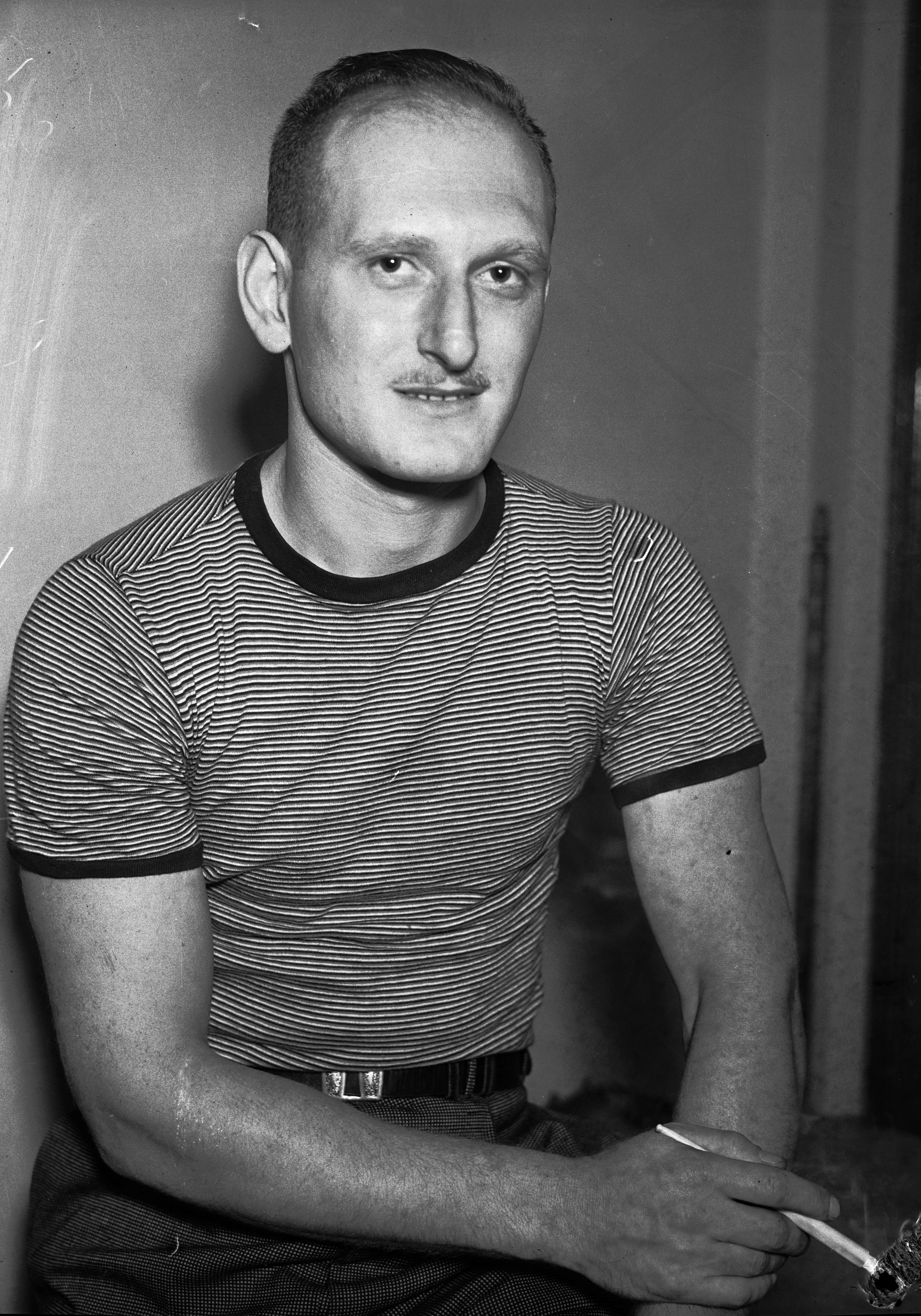
- Franklin, c. 1932

Personal information
- Nickname: El Torero de la Torah
- Born: Sidney Frumkin; July 11, 1903 Brooklyn, New York City, New York, US
- Died: April 26, 1976 (aged 72) Manhattan, New York City, New York, US

Sport
- Sport: Bullfighting
- Rank: Matador

Sidney Franklin (born Sidney Frumkin; 11 July 1903 – 26 April 1976) was the first American to become a successful matador, the most senior level of bullfighter.

== Early years, family and education ==
Sidney Frumkin (or Frumpkin) was born in Brooklyn, New York City, New York, to Orthodox Jewish parents who fled Russian persecution and came to the US. His father was a policeman. The family resided in Park Slope, Brooklyn, and he was the fifth of ten children. As a youth, Sidney aspired to be an artist and won a prize for his beaded embroidery. He was a student for three years at Brooklyn's Commercial High School and also studied Spanish at Columbia University's extension department.

== Career ==
In 1922, he relocated to Mexico City and changed his surname to Franklin. He owned and ran a printing and poster business. On September 20, 1923, he began a career in bullfighting, instructed by the prominent torero Rodolfo Gaona. He fought bulls in Spain (beginning in 1929), Portugal, Colombia, and Panama as well. Franklin's nickname acknowledged his Jewish heritage: El Torero de la Torah.

He met fellow American Ernest Hemingway in 1929, and they became close friends. In Death in the Afternoon, Hemingway wrote:

he is one of the most skillful, graceful and slow manipulators of a cape fighting today. His repertoire with the cape is enormous but he does not attempt by a varied repertoire to escape from the performance of the veronica as the base of his cape work and his veronicas are classical, very emotional, and beautifully timed and executed.

Hemingway adds:

He is a better, more scientific, more intelligent, and more finished matador than all but about six of the full matadors in Spain today and the bullfighters know it and have the utmost respect for him.

Author Ernest Hemingway on Franklin’s fluency in the languages of Spain: “He speaks Spanish so grammatically good and so classically perfect, with all the slang and damn accents and twenty-seven dialects, that nobody would believe he is an American. He is as good in Spanish as T. E. Lawrence is in Arabic.”

Journalist Lillian Ross describes one of Franklin's early successes as a matador:

Franklin began to make history in the bull ring at his Spanish début on June 9, 1929, in Seville. Aficionados who saw him fight that day wept and shouted, and talked about for weeks afterward…“Sidney was a glowing Golden Boy,” recalls an American lady who was at the fight. “He was absolutely without fear. He was absolutely beautiful.”

Ross in her biographical essay offers an example of Franklin's efficiency in “dispatching bulls” while appearing at a Madrid bull ring billed with two other matadors: “One day early in his career, Franklin killed the two bulls that were allotted him. Then taking the place of the two other matadors, who had been gored, killed four more.” Franklin killed about 5,000 bulls, and survived two severe gorings and numerous other serious injuries, during his career. According to A. E. Hotchner, "Lillian Ross's career with The New Yorker was founded on the success of her profile of the bullfighter Sidney Franklin."

Franklin appeared in a few feature films in the US and Mexico. Later he presented bullfights on American TV. He played himself in The Kid from Spain, an Eddie Cantor vehicle. He wrote an autobiography, Bullfighter from Brooklyn (1952), although it is not considered reliable. He was considered an authority on bullfighting, even writing for Encyclopædia Britannica.

As his bullfighting career waned, he worked as a manager at a Seville cafe.

== Personal life ==
He was a close friend of the American actor James Dean, who was a big fan of the art of bullfighting.

Franklin was gay, his sexual identity having been an open secret among those who knew him, but remaining unknown to the public. In his autobiography, he wrote of heterosexual relationships that are considered fictitious. His romantic partner, Julio, would travel as his valet.

In the late 1950s, Franklin returned to North America, residing in Mexico and Texas. He lived in a nursing home in Manhattan during his final seven years, dying in 1976 at age 72 of natural causes.

== Partial filmography ==
- The Kid from Spain (1932)

== Sources ==
- Franklin, Sidney (1952) Bullfighter from Brooklyn. New York: Prentice-Hall, Inc.
- Paul, Bart (2009). Double-Edged Sword: The Many Lives of Hemingway's Friend, the American Matador Sidney Franklin. Lincoln: University of Nebraska Press.
- "Sidney Franklin: Bullfighter from Flatbush" http://www.jewsinsports.org/Publication.asp?titleID=3&current_page=375
- Sidney Franklin Collection.; P-894; American Jewish Historical Society, Boston, MA and New York.
- "Yanqui Matador",
