= Fran Frey =

American singer (1903–1962)

- Born: December 23, 1903; Indiana
- Died: December 1, 1962 (aged 58); California
- Known for: work for George Olsen

Fran Frey (December 23, 1903 in Indiana - December 1, 1962 in California) was a singer and saxophonist best known for his work for George Olsen and His Music in the 1920s and early 1930s. Among his better known songs are "The Varsity Drag" of 1927; "Big City Blues" of 1929, and "A Garden in the Rain", also of 1929. Frey sang on 77 songs with the George Olsen band on recordings and on the radio. "Who?" sold more than a million copies.

Frey was heard on the Oldsmobile Program on CBS radio in 1933.

Frey was the composer of the song, "Tell The Story", which was used as the early theme song for the 1940s radio program The Big Story, starring Edward G. Robinson. The composition was recorded again in 1962 by Frank De Vol and his Rainbow Strings orchestra, and published on their album, "More Radio's Great Old Themes". Sometime in the 1980s radio host John Hickman of WAMU used it as the opening theme music for the old time radio variety show The Big Broadcast, and it has remained the theme song for The Big Broadcast continuously since then.

Although he played for several other bands after Olsen's, including Victor Young's, he never achieved the level of fame he had in earlier years.

Frey died of a heart attack in his home on December 2, 1962, at the age of 58. At the time of his death, he was writing music for the Ice Capades and for Columbia Pictures.
