= Charley Straight =

American pianist, bandleader and composer (1891–1940)

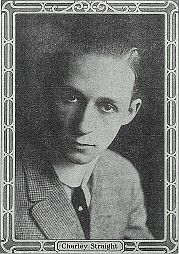

Background information
- Born: Charles Theodore Straight; January 16, 1891; Chicago, Illinois, U.S.
- Died: September 22, 1940 Chicago, Illinois, U.S.
- Genres: Ragtime, jazz
- Occupations: Musician, composer, arranger, orchestra leader
- Instrument: Piano

Charles Theodore "Charley" Straight (January 16, 1891 – September 22, 1940) was an American pianist, bandleader and composer.

== Biography ==
Straight, who was born in Chicago, started his career in 1909 accompanying singer Gene Greene in Vaudeville. In 1916, he began working at the Imperial Piano Roll Company in Chicago, where he recorded dozens of piano rolls. He became a popular bandleader in Chicago during the 1920s. His band, the Charley Straight Orchestra, had a long term engagement at the Rendezvous Café from 1922 to 1925 and recorded for Paramount Records and Brunswick Records in the 1920s.

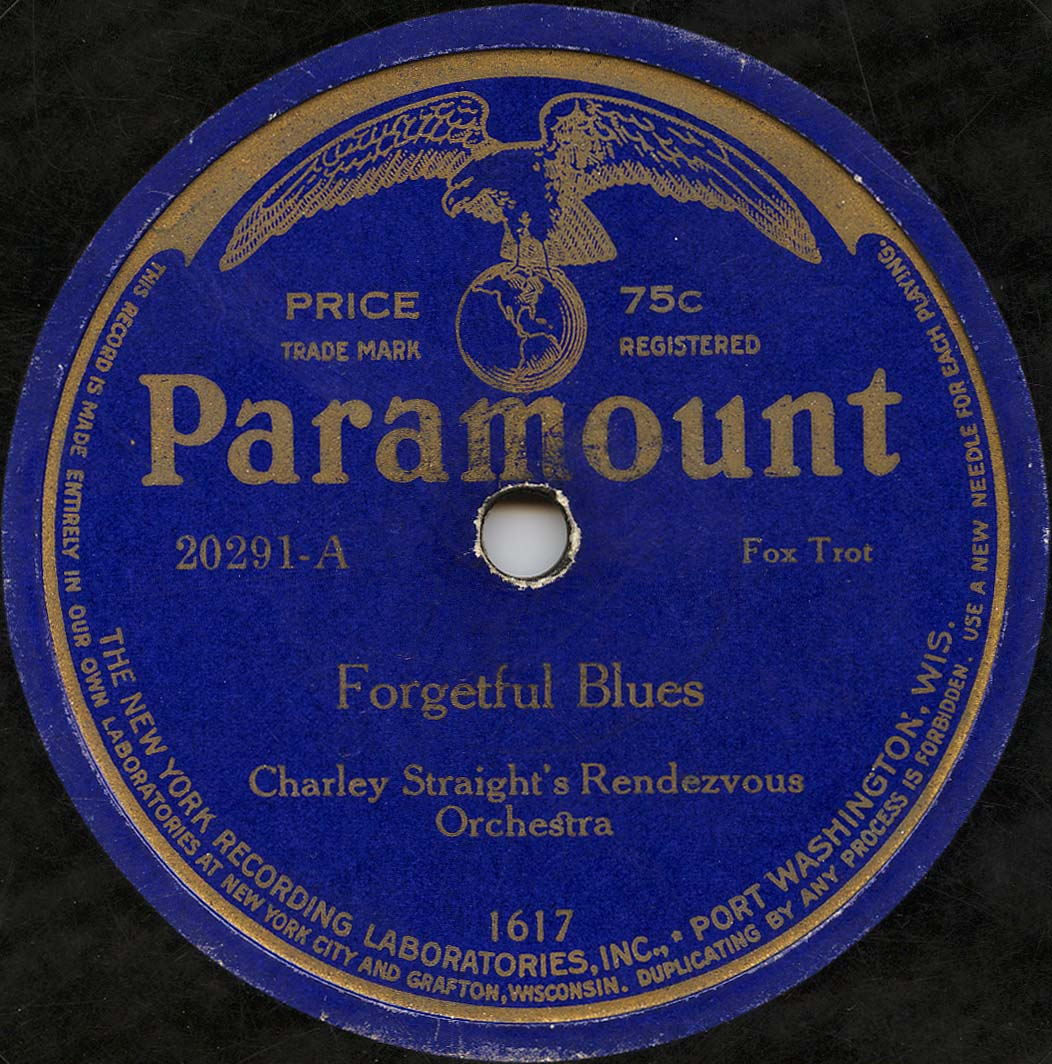
The label of Charley Straight's recording of "Forgetful Blues" for Paramount, made in 1923.

During the 1920s, Straight worked with Roy Bargy on the latter's eight Piano Syncopations. In describing "Rufenreddy", the fifth in the series, the ragtime historian "Perfessor" Bill Edwards stated:

The actual parentage of this piece will likely remain obscured to some degree, since Bargy's collaborator, Charley Straight, more or less may have let Bargy take credit when the piano rolls of the Eight Piano Syncopations were transcribed into sheet music form. It is likely that Straight wrote the bulk of the composition in 1918, and Bargy added many of his individual touches to it in the performance, the end result being that there is some of each of them within.

Straight died in Chicago on the evening of September 22, 1940, after being struck by a car. At the time, Straight was working as a sanitary inspector for the city of Chicago, and was emerging from a manhole in the street.

== Selected compositions ==
- "Rufenreddy" (with Roy Bargy, 1921)
- "Knice and Knifty" (with Roy Bargy, 1922)
- "Playmor"
- "Itsit"
- "Blue Grass Rag" (1918)
- "Let's Go" (1915)
- "Humpty Dumpty" (1914)
- "Hot Hands" (1916)
- "Sweet Pickin's" (1918)
- "Wild And Wooly"
- "S'more"
- "Nifty Nonsense" (1918)
- "Black Jack Rag" (1917)
- "Rag-A-Bit" (1918)
- "Fastep" (1918)
- "Dippy Ditty" (1918)
- "Lazy Bones"
- "Out Steppin'" (1917)
- "My Baby's Rag"
- "Universal Rag"
- "Mow 'Em Down" (1918)
- "Try Me"
- "Red Raven Rag" (1915)
- "Mocking Bird Rag"
- "King Of The Bungaloos"
- "I Need Some Pettin`" With Robert A. King (1924)

== See also ==
- List of ragtime composers

== Sources ==
- Jasen, David A.; Trebor Jay Tichenor (1978). Rags and Ragtime: A Musical History. New York, NY: Dover Publications, Inc. ISBN 0-486-25922-6.
