= Oldsmobile Program =

1933-1934 old-time radio variety program

The Oldsmobile Show
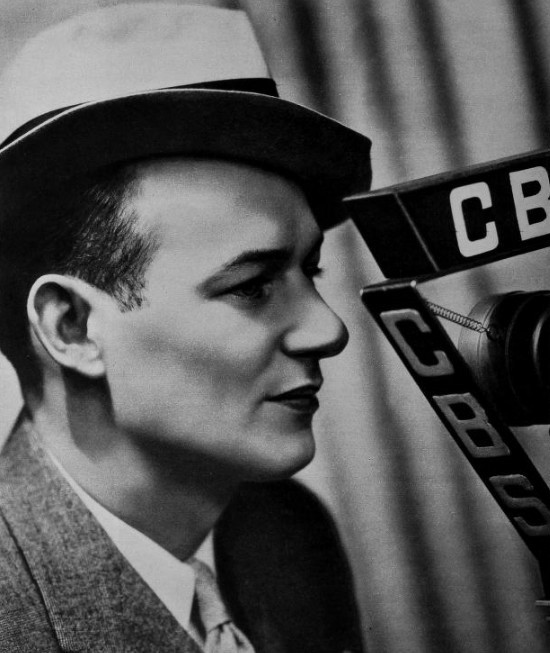
- Ted Husing, host of the Oldsmobile Program
- Genre: Variety
- Running time: 30 minutes
- Country of origin: United States
- Language: English
- Syndicates: CBS
- Starring: Ted Husing
- Original release: 1933 – 1934

The Oldsmobile Show is a half-hour weekly old-time radio variety program in the United States. It was broadcast on CBS in 1933 and 1934.

== Format ==
The Oldsmobile Program featured "Ted Husing's sport talks" and music.

== Personnel ==
Ted Husing was the program's host. The Encyclopedia of American Radio, 1920-1960, 2nd Edition says that Leon Belasco's orchestra provided the music, with contralto Barbara Mauel as soloist and the Hummingbirds as the vocal group. The April 1933 issue of Radio News indicates that George Olsen and his orchestra were the musicians for the program, with Ethel Shutta, Fran Frey and Richard Gardner singing and that Gus Van was "continuing the comedy and character songs which were identified with the Van and Schenck stage partnership of twenty years.

In 1934, Husing continued as the host, with Ruth Etting as soloist, backed by Johnny Green and his orchestra.
