= A Few Moments with Eddie Cantor =

1923 film directed by Lee De Forest

A Few Moments with Eddie Cantor, Star of 'Kid Boots'
- Directed by: Lee De Forest
- Produced by: Lee De Forest
- Starring: Eddie Cantor
- Release date: April 15, 1923
- Running time: 7 minutes
- Country: United States
- Language: English

A Few Moments with Eddie Cantor also known as A Few Moments with Eddie Cantor, Star of "Kid Boots" is an early sound film made in Lee De Forest's sound-on-film Phonofilm process in late 1923 or early 1924 starring Eddie Cantor in an excerpt from the Broadway show Kid Boots. Some sources say the film premiered along with other De Forest phonofilms at the Rivoli Theater in New York City on April 15, 1923. However, Kid Boots opened on Broadway somewhat later, on December 31, 1923.

It contains two songs: "The Dumber They Are, the Better I Like 'Em," and "Oh, Gee, Georgie." The rest of the recorded material would be considered standup comedy. In all, the recording is nearly seven minutes long.

The music was orchestrated by George Olsen.
