= Benson Orchestra of Chicago =

American musical ensemble

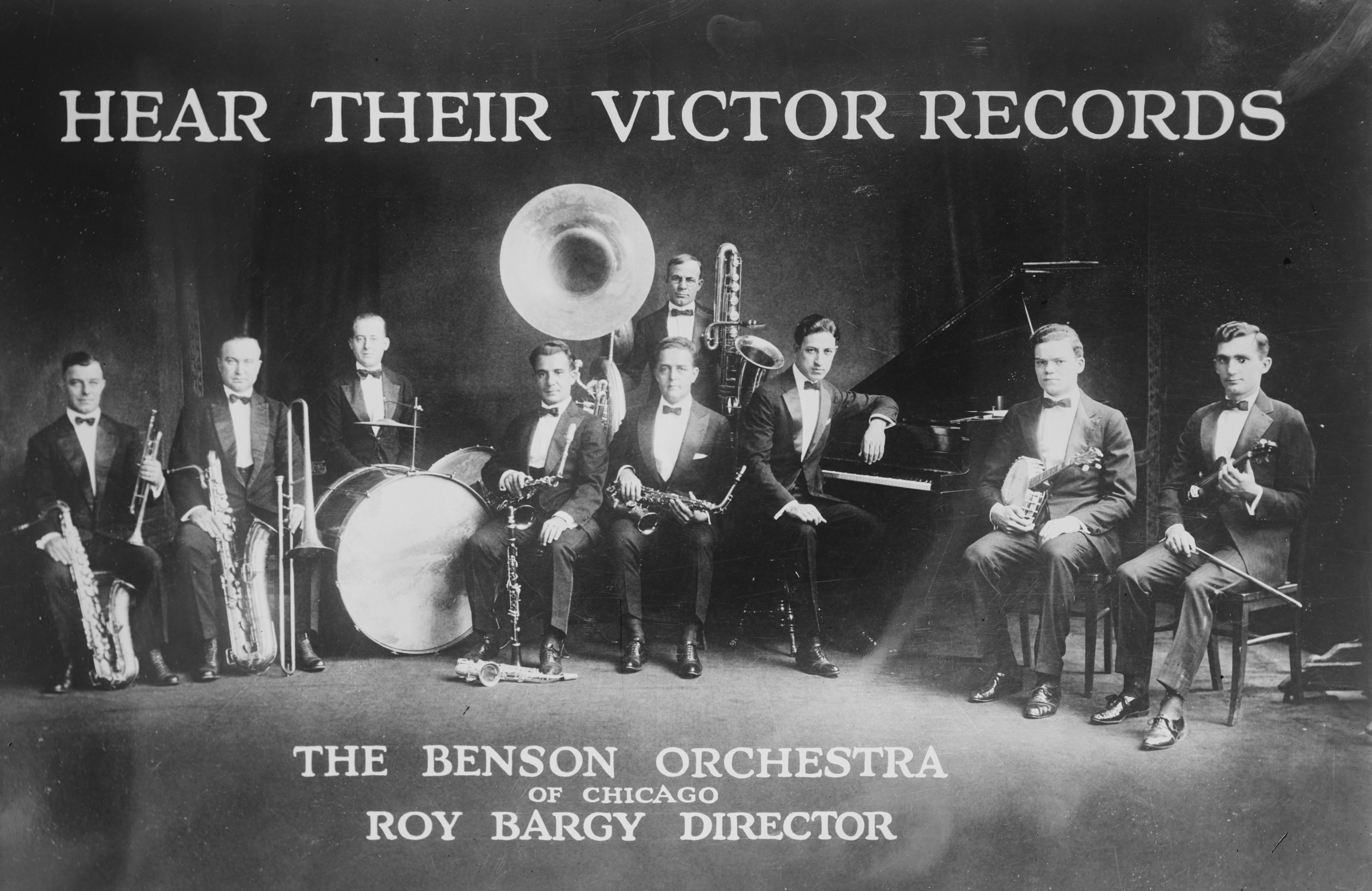
The Benson Orchestra of Chicago in a Victor Records publicity photo

The Benson Orchestra of Chicago was an American musical ensemble that was popular during the 1920s. Founded by Edgar A. Benson, its members at different times included saxophonist Frankie Trumbauer, drummer Gene Krupa, and pianists Roy Bargy and, later, Don Bestor, who served as its musical directors.

== History ==
The orchestra was established in 1920 by Edgar Archibald Benson (1878–1946), a St. Louis-born cellist who had become an impresario responsible for managing and booking many bands in Chicago after establishing himself there around 1897.

The Benson Orchestra was initially directed by pianist Roy Bargy, and recorded for Victor Records from 1921. The band soon became one of the most popular dance bands of the early 1920s, and had its base at the Marigold Gardens, which had some notoriety as a gangster hang-out. Members of the band in its early days were Roy Bargy (piano, arranger, leader); Matthew Amaturo (clarinet, alto sax, soprano sax); Rick Adkins (trumpet); Guy Carey (trombone); Tom Thatcher (tenor sax); Joe Baum (violin); Joe Miller (banjo); William Foeste (bass sax, tuba); Albert Walthall (violin); and Arthur Layfield (drums). The tune "Na Jo", recorded in 1921, has been cited as the first recording of "stop-time" playing; other early successes included "Ain't We Got Fun?" and "Wabash Blues", which reportedly sold some 750,000 copies.

Roy Bargy left the band in 1922 after an argument with Benson, and many of the musicians left with him. He was replaced as bandleader and pianist by Don Bestor, and new band members included saxophonist Frankie Trumbauer and, in the mid 1920s, drummer Gene Krupa. The band continued to record successfully, with hits including one of the first recordings of "Tea for Two" in 1925. That year, Bestor left, and trumpeter Fred Hamm took over as leader. Thereafter the band continued to disintegrate, although its name continued to be used on records until the end of the 1920s. Edgar Benson himself lost effective control of the Chicago dance band business in the mid- and late 1920s to rival booking agent Jules Stein.
