= The Kid from Spain =

1932 film

The Kid From Spain
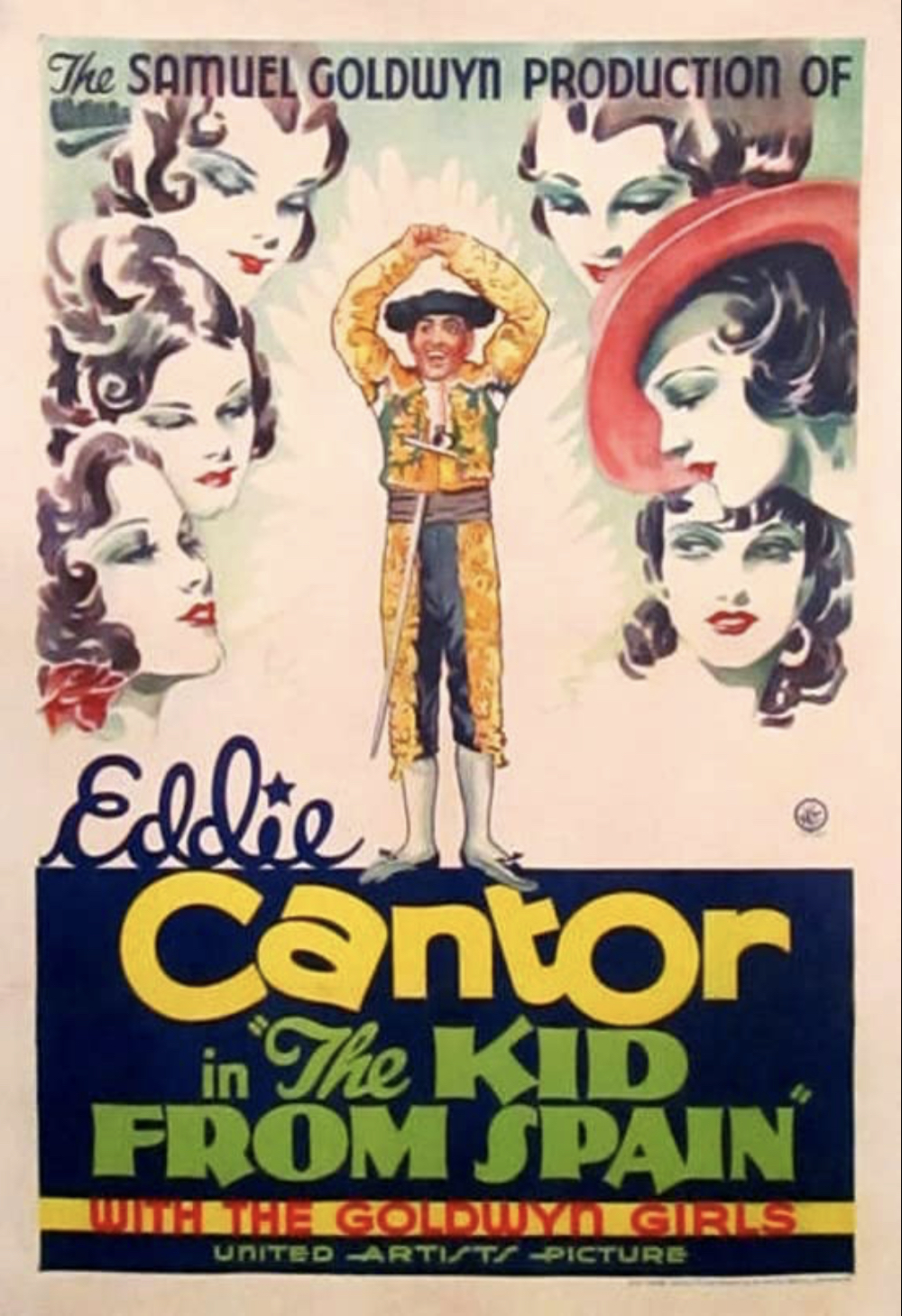
- Theatrical release poster
- Directed by: Leo McCarey
- Written by: William Anthony McGuire; Bert Kalmar; Harry Ruby
- Produced by: Samuel Goldwyn
- Starring: Eddie Cantor
- Cinematography: Gregg Toland
- Edited by: Stuart Heisler
- Music by: Harry Ruby with lyrics by Bert Kalmar
- Production company: Samuel Goldwyn Productions
- Distributed by: United Artists
- Release date: November 17, 1932 (New York City)
- Running time: 96 minutes
- Country: United States
- Language: English
- Budget: $0.9 million-$1 million
- Box office: $2,621,000

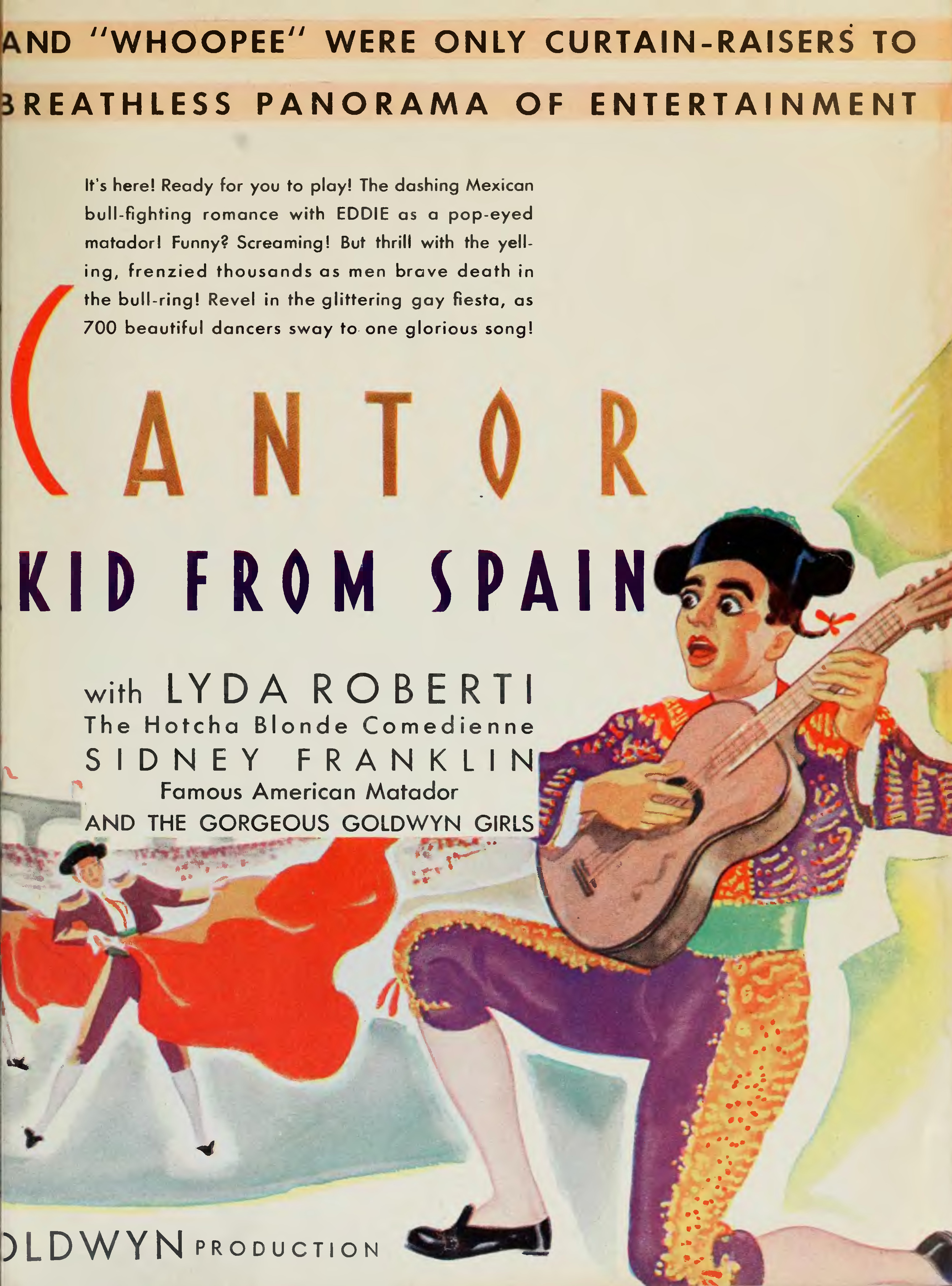
1932 advert from The Film Daily

The Kid from Spain is a 1932 American pre-Code black-and-white musical comedy film directed by Leo McCarey. Harry Ruby and Bert Kalmar composed the songs, and Busby Berkeley is credited with creating and directing the film's musical scenes. It was Jane Wyman's film debut. As a published work from 1932, the film will enter the American public domain on January 1, 2028.

== Plot ==
Eddie, recently expelled from college, is mistaken for the gangster getaway driver in a heist. He flees to Mexico, pursued relentlessly by a detective. There he masquerades as a matador and performs in bullfights.

== Cast ==
- Eddie Cantor as Eddie Williams
- Lyda Roberti as Rosalie
- Robert Young as Ricardo
- Ruth Hall as Anita Gomez
- John Miljan as Pancho
- Noah Beery, Sr. as Alonzo Gomez
- J. Carrol Naish as Pedro
- Robert Emmett O'Connor as Detective Crawford
- Stanley Fields as Jose
- Paul Porcasi as Gonzales
- Sidney Franklin as himself – American Matador

Also appearing in uncredited roles are Harry C. Bradley, Edgar Connor,Teresa Maxwell-Conover, Eduardo de Castro, Harry Gribbon, Paul Panzer, Julian Rivero, Walter Walker, Leo Willis, Tammany Young, and the stock company of the Goldwyn Girls, consisting at that time of Betty Grable, Beatrice Hagen, Paulette Goddard, Toby Wing, Jane Wyman, Althea Henley, Dorothy Coonan Wellman, Shirley Chambers, and Lynn Browning.

== Production ==
A high-production feature, The Kid From Spain was provided a million-dollar budget by producer Samuel Goldwyn and engaged some of the finest artistic and technical talent available in Hollywood during the early 1930s. Eddie Cantor was ranked among the top box office stars in the US in 1933: in overseas popularity he out-performed Greta Garbo and Marlene Dietrich. Choreography was provided by Busby Berkeley, and cameraman Gregg Toland, who would film Citizen Kane (1941) was cinematographer.

Goldwyn, a notoriously "autocratic" producer, attempted to suppress any revisions to the story or script, treating director McCarey "brusquely" during filming. Cantor, in his 1957 autobiography Take My Life, recalled how he and McCarey circumvented Goldwyn: "One afternoon we got to a scene that didn't play funny." Feigning illness, Cantor left the studio and absconded for the weekend to McCarey's beach house in Santa Barbara. There he and the director overhauled the scene. Cantor continues: "Monday we shot one of the best scenes of the picture. Goldwyn, seeing the rushes, was amused and baffled. He couldn't figure out where the scene had come from."

The cost of the film was reported by Variety at $900,000 however, their review noted that it was said that the production budget had reached $1 million.

Cantor was due to share in the gross of the film if the gross rental exceeded $600,000, despite the film's cost being higher.

== Promotion ==
The publicity for The Kid from Spain was provided in part by Eddie Cantor, who plugged the upcoming film on The Fleischmann's Yeast Hour, as well as on his vaudeville tour in late 1932 that complimented the release of the film in November.

The film also enjoyed the serendipitous release of author Ernest Hemingway's best seller Death in the Afternoon (1932), a tribute to bullfighting traditions in Spain. The famous Brooklyn-born matador Sidney Franklin is highlighted in Hemingway's book, and makes his appearance in The Kid from Spain, in which he demonstrates his talents as a bullfighter. These scenes were filmed at a ring specially built at United Artists studios and attended by screen stars Charlie Chaplin, Douglas Fairbanks Sr. and Mary Pickford.

== Release ==
The film opened at the Palace Theatre in New York City on November 17, 1932 in a roadshow theatrical release with a $2.20 ticket price. At the Palace, and for other roadshow releases, it was distributed by Goldwyn but regular release distribution was through United Artists. It opened at Warner Brothers' Western theatre in Hollywood on November 22, 1932 with a top price of $5, reducing to $1.60 from the second night. It left the Palace on January 3, 1933 and moved into the Rivoli. The first out-of-town dates under regular release were on December 31, 1932 in Montreal; Erie; Charleston, West Virginia and Steubenville, Ohio.

== Reception ==
The Kid from Spain enjoyed widespread approval among critics, as well as box office success. Critic Thorton Delehanty in The New York Post wrote "Eddie Cantor contributes some excruciatingly funny moments" and The Hollywood Reporter declared that "Leo McCarey's directions should land this fellow right on his feet in front of the ranks of the present-day hit directors."

Abel Green of Variety called it "a swell flicker" and "one of the year's stronger pix" but, referring to the roadshow ticket prices at the Palace, felt it wasn't "a $2 picture". Their review claimed that Cantor knew this and included the following comment from Cantor to Al Lichtman of United Artists on the night of the opening: "But speaking of tickets, Al, I'd be happier if this were in the Rivoli at 75c. Believe me! A guy making a small salary must give up 10% of his [weekly] income to see me in a picture. That's too tough nowadays, Al."

The film grossed $2,160 in its opening day at the Palace and over $13,000 for the weekend and $23,000 for the week.

The Kid From Spain was profitable in general release even as the US was descending into the Great Depression. With the high roadshow release prices at a time when the average admission price to a movie theater was less than 25 cents, film historian Wes D. Gehring notes that "neither McCarey nor Cantor was pleased with this less than egalitarian pricing."

== Retrospective appraisal ==
Film critic Wes D. Gehring, describing The Kid From Spain as "a challenging and crazy comedy" for director Leo McCarey, comments on vaudevillian Eddie Cantor's burlesque-influenced contribution to the film:

Even today, with those expressive rolling eyes or his signature comic song shtick of skipping gait and clapping hands, the Cantor energy level still makes Spain a very entertaining picture.

Gehring adds that The Kid From Spain is "overdue for rediscovery".

== Sources ==
- Gehring, Wes D. 2005. Leo McCarey: From Marx to McCarthy. The Scarecrow Press. Lantham, Maryland, Toronto, Oxford. ISBN 0-8108-5263-2
- Hooper, Gary and Poague, Leland. 1980. Leo McCarey Filmography in The Hollywood Professionals: Wilder and McCarey, Volume 7. The Tanvity Press, A. S. Barnes and Company, Inc., San Diego, California. pp. 295–314 ISBN 0498-02181-5
- Thomson, David. 2003. The New Biographical Dictionary of Film. Alfred A. Knopf, New York. ISBN 978-0307271747
