= Nestle Chocolateers =

1930s old-time radio musical program

Nestle Chocolateers is an old-time radio musical program in the United States. It was broadcast on NBC-Blue in the early 1930s. The name is often found in publications as Nestle's Chocolateers. The 30-minute program's title came from its sponsorship by the Nestle Chocolate Company. It debuted September 5, 1930.

Helen Morgan was featured on the program's initial broadcast. She was the first of 26 performers from Broadway to appear on the show. Nat Brusiloff's orchestra provided instrumental music in the program's early years, followed by Don Bestor's orchestra. Singers Chick Farmer, Ethel Merman, Mary Spencer and Ethel Shutta were featured at various times. Walter O'Keefe was "announcer, host and performer." In 1933, Phil Spitalny directed the orchestra for the program and for personal appearances.

A review in the October 1933 issue of Radio Fan-Fare magazine described O'Keefe as "thoroughly at ease in the capacity of announcer, performer, and master of ceremonies .. with a swell sense of humor ...." The same review described Shutta as "a foolproof radio attraction. She knows how to sing songs, and she knows how to sell 'em."
