= George Olsen =

American drummer (1893–1971)

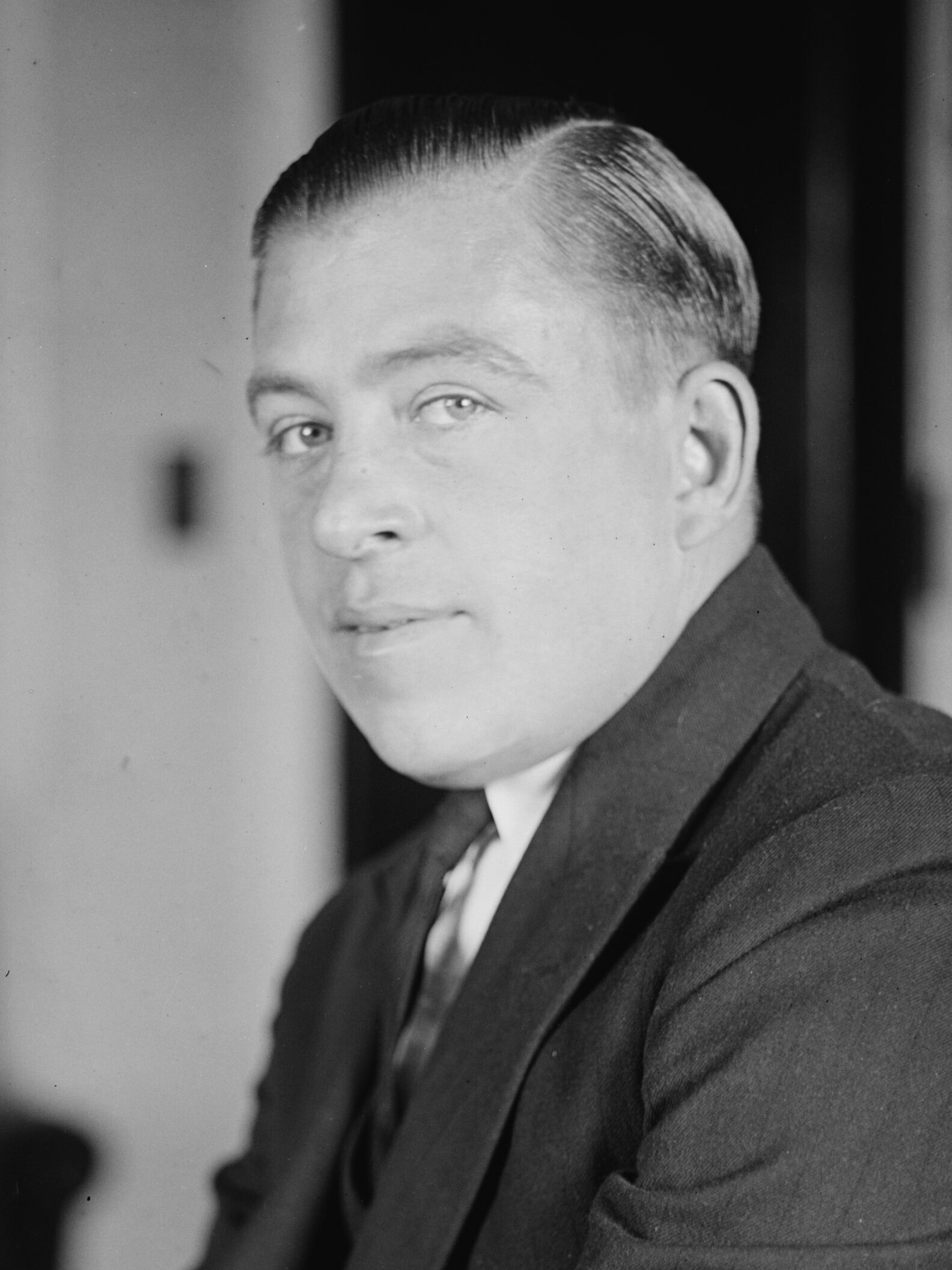

Background information
- Born: George Edward Olsen Sr. March 18, 1893; Portland, Oregon, U.S.
- Died: March 18, 1971 (aged 78) Paramus, New Jersey, U.S.
- Genres: Swing music, big band
- Occupations: Bandleader, Musician
- Instrument: Drums
- Label: Victor

George Edward Olsen Sr. (March 18, 1893 – March 18, 1971) was an American musician and bandleader.

Born in Portland, Oregon, Olsen's orchestra's debut hotel engagement came at the Multnomah Hotel in Portland. He then made the cross-country transition to Broadway, appearing in Kid Boots (1923), the Ziegfeld Follies of 1924, Ziegfeld Follies of 1925, and Good News (1927).

George Olsen and his orchestra were in Eddie Cantor's 1928 Broadway hit Whoopee!, and in the 1930 movie version. In the Follies George met a singer, Ethel Shutta, who sings and dances memorably in Whoopee!, and they married, appearing together in nightclubs and on radio. They had two children, George Jr. and Charles; following a divorce, Olsen opened a restaurant in Paramus, New Jersey. Olsen and Shutta were heard on the Oldsmobile Program on CBS radio in 1933. He also was an orchestra leader for The Jack Benny Program on radio.

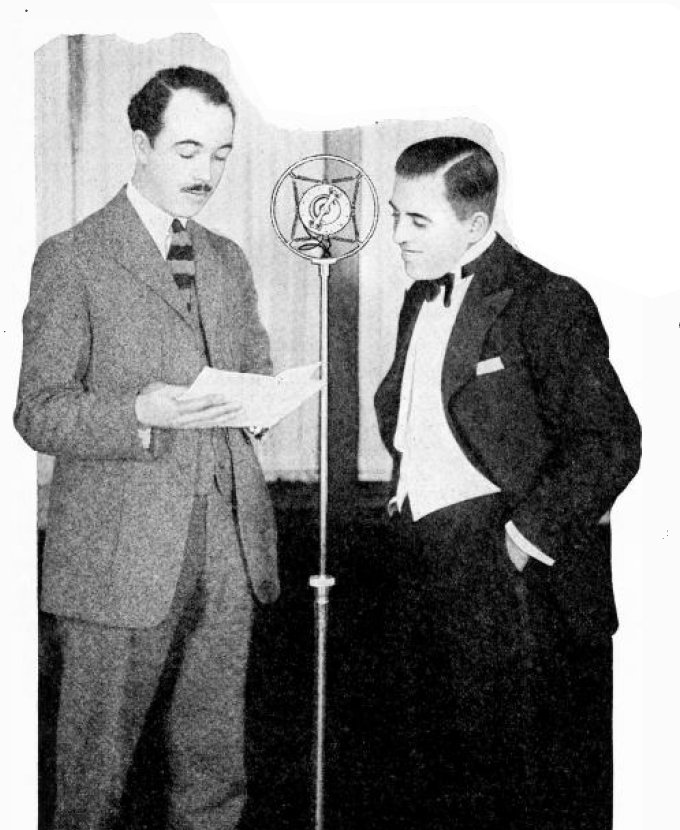
George Olsen (right) interviewed at RCA's radio station WJZ in New York City in 1926

In 1924, Olsen signed with the Victor Talking Machine Company and remained one of Victor's most popular bands until 1933 when he joined Columbia Records. He stayed with Columbia through January, 1934. He recorded a single session in 1938 for Decca, and one final date for the rare Varsity label in 1940.

Olsen's bands produced few stars. Singer-saxophonist Fred MacMurray passed through in 1930 on his way to eventual movie stardom, recording a vocal on I'm in the Market for You. Olsen's long-time alto saxist and singer, Fran Frey, with his distinctive, reedy bass-baritone, was perhaps the best known Olsenite until he left in 1933 for a career as a music director in radio.

In 1936, Olsen became leader of Orville Knapp's band after Knapp died in a plane crash. Olsen was chosen to lead the band by Knapp's widow. Morale problems plagued the group, and in 1938, after many musicians had already left, the group disbanded.

A resident of Paramus, New Jersey, Olsen ran a popular local restaurant there on Paramus Road for many years before he died there on March 18, 1971. According to John S. Wilson in The New York Times, reviewing a retrospective of Olsen's recording "George Olsen and His Music" on RCA Victor, in 1968, Olsen had a restaurant in Paramus, New Jersey, called "George Olsen's". Wilson noted that "Olsen is there every day greeting guests at lunch and dinner... In the background, the original George Olsen records of the Twenties play softly.

After his divorce from Shutta, Olsen married Claralee Pilcer.

== Discography (partial) ==
- "Beale Street Blues" (1924)
- "Biminy" (1924)
- "Everybody Loves My Baby" (1925)
- "He's The Hottest Man in Town" (1924)
- "My Best Girl" (1924)
- "My Papa Doesn't Two-Time No Time" (1924)
- "Nancy" (1924)
- "Put Away A Little Ray Of Golden Sunshine For A Rainy Day" (1924)
- "Sax-o-phun" (1924)
- "The Slave of Love" (1924)
- "You'll Never Get To Heaven With Those Eyes" (1924)
- "Save Your Sorrow (For Tomorrow)" (1925)
- "Horses" (1926)
- "Lullaby of the Leaves" (1932)
