= Don Bestor =

American bandleader (1889–1970)

- Don Bestor
- Born: September 23, 1889; Longford, South Dakota, U.S.
- Died: January 13, 1970 (aged 80); Metamora, Illinois, U.S.
- Occupation: Bandleader
- Known for: Leading orchestra on The Jack Benny Program in the old-time radio era
- Spouses: Frankie Classen (or Klassen or Klossam) Beulah; Hattie
- Children: 4

Don Bestor (September 23, 1889 - January 13, 1970) was an American bandleader, probably best known for directing the orchestra in the early years of The Jack Benny Program on old-time radio.

== Early years ==
Bestor was born September 13, 1889, in Longford, South Dakota (although his birthplace also has been cited as Madison, Wisconsin). His mother was Mrs. Carrie Bestor. His brother, A.L. Bestor, was also a musician, directing the orchestra of the Orpheum Theater in Madison.

== Critical evaluations ==
Jazz writer George T. Simon wrote that Bestor "led one of the best bands of the twenties, the Benson Orchestra of Chicago. Its music was rhythmic, crisp and clean." In September 1925, the trade publication Variety reported that the Don Bestor name appeared "by itself on the Victor label, [an arrangement which] gives Bestor solo billing, and deservedly so."

In 1926 Bestor recorded 'I've Got The Girl' with a refrain by a group of male vocalists. One member of that vocal group, in his very first recording, was Bing Crosby. (It was over a year before Crosby recorded his first solo with Paul Whiteman).

A 1942 review on the trade publication Billboard said about Bestor's band at that time, "There's nothing fancy or flashy about this combination; it's just a sound, well-balanced band that offers a good brand of music and looks wholesome and pleasing on the stand."

By 1949, a list of bands in Billboard designated Bestor's group as "inactive."

== Radio ==
=== 1920s ===
Bestor's radio debut occurred in 1922 on KDKA in Pittsburgh, Pennsylvania. His orchestra, which was playing at the William Penn Hotel, was broadcast over the station in what was described in his obituary as "the world's first remote control orchestra pickup." He also led orchestras at WLW in Cincinnati, Ohio, in 1925 and at WGN in Chicago, Illinois, in 1925-26. By 1928, he and his orchestra were back on KDKA.

=== 1930s ===
Bestor's tenure at KDKA ended in 1931. A June 13 newspaper listing had the headline "Don Bestor to Say Farewell: Final Concert to Be Played Over KDKA Sunday at 7:15 P.M."

In 1932, Bestor and his orchestra were in New York City and "on the air over an NBC-WEAF hook-up four nights a week." In the summer of 1933, the group was broadcast "from the 'Show Boat' on Lake George via remote control" over WGY in Schenectady, New York. Bestor's orchestra also provided the music for the Nestle Chocolateers program in 1933.

On April 6, 1934, Bestor became the bandleader for Jack Benny's radio program, The General Tire Show. A statement from the sponsor said, in part, "Good music is an important part of a program such as Jack Benny presents, and critics who have commented on the excellence of the Benny broadcasts give no small part of the credit for their results to the tenor voice of Frank Parker and the intriguing melodies of Don Bestor and his musicians."

When Johnny Green replaced Bestor on the Benny program, a newspaper article noted: "Benny turned Bestor overnight from just another orchestra leader to the one man in America everyone knew wore spats... Bestor just finished a tour of the country on which he billed himself as the band that played with radio's king pin [sic] of humor."

Also in 1935, Bestor ran afoul of the musicians' union "because of paying his men under the scale while on the Jack Benny program," but he was reinstated in December.

Bestor had programs on CBS in 1936, on WLW in 1937, and on the Mutual Broadcasting System in 1939.

=== 1940s ===
On December 14, 1942, Bestor became the leader of the studio orchestra at WHN in New York City. His programs at that station included Gloom Dodgers.

=== 1950s ===
In 1954-55, Bestor and his wife had a disk jockey show on WICC (AM) in Bridgeport, Connecticut.

== Compositions ==
Bestor's musical compositions, described as "catchy but fleetingly popular," included Doodle-De-Doo, Just Baby and Me, Contented, Teach Me to Smile, and Down by the Vinegar Works. Probably the best known of his compositions was the J-E-L-L-O jingle for the Jell-O brand of gelatin dessert. In 1942, Bestor sued Benny, General Foods, NBC, and the Young & Rubicam advertising agency alleging that they "converted [his jingle] to their own use without his consent." Bestor also wrote the song that was the theme of the Carnation Milk program.

== Personal life ==
Bestor married Frankie Classen (or Klassen or Klossam), a dancer who was a "favorite of Chicago night club audiences." They had a daughter, Mary Ann. Bestor later married "a jet-set covergirl model," and they had a son, Don Bestor Jr., and a daughter, Robyn. He was also married to Hattie C. Bestor Catton. In 1937, a judge in Illinois ordered Bestor to surrender "insurance policies with a cash value of $3,000" to her "for back support of their 16 year old son, Bartley Bestor."

Mary Ann became an actress and at age 16 "signed for [the] No. 2 company of 'Eve of St. Mark'" in Pittsburgh, Pennsylvania, in 1942.

== Death ==
Bestor died of a cerebral hemorrhage January 13, 1970, in Metamora, Illinois. He was 80.

== Partial discography ==
- Animal Crackers in My Soup (Brunswick 7495)
- Are you Sorry? 1925 (Victor 19744)
