= Whoopee! =

1928 musical comedy

- Poster for the 1979 Broadway revival.; Illustration by Hilary Knight
- Music: Walter Donaldson
- Lyrics: Gus Kahn
- Book: William Anthony McGuire
- Basis: Owen Davis's play The Nervous Wreck
- Productions: 1928 Broadway; 1979 Broadway revival

Whoopee! is a 1928 musical comedy play with a book based on Owen Davis's play, The Nervous Wreck. The musical libretto was written by William Anthony McGuire, with music by Walter Donaldson and lyrics by Gus Kahn. The musical premiered on Broadway in 1928, starring Eddie Cantor, and introduced the hit song "Love Me or Leave Me", sung by Ruth Etting. A film version opened in 1930.

== Synopsis ==
Setting: Mission Rest, Arizona; Black Top Canyon; The Bar "M" Ranch; the Wilderness; the Desert.

Sheriff Bob Wells and the daughter of a rancher Sally Morgan are getting married. She is in love with Wanenis, whose part-Indian heritage presents social difficulties for their romance. Sally abandons Sheriff Bob and their wedding, catching a ride with Henry Williams. As a hypochondriac, Henry has problems of his own, but Sally adds to his problems when she leaves a note saying they have eloped. A chase ensues, with the jilted Bob; Mary, Henry's nurse who is in love with him; and a cast of others. Along the way they arrive at the Indian Reservation where Wanenis lives. The movie star Leslie Daw enters the proceedings and sings the torchy, sentimental "Love Me, or Leave Me".

== Songs ==
Act I

- "It's a Beautiful Day Today"
- "Here's to the Girl of My Heart"
- "Red, Red Rose"
- "Gypsy Joe"
- "Makin' Whoopee"
- "Until You Get Somebody Else"
- "Taps"
- "Come West, Little Girl, Come West"
- "The Movietone of the Gypsy Song"
- "Stetson"

Act II

- "The Song of the Setting Sun"
- "Love Is the Mountain"
- "Red Mamma"
- "Love Me or Leave Me"
- "Hallowe'en Whoopee Ball"

== Productions ==
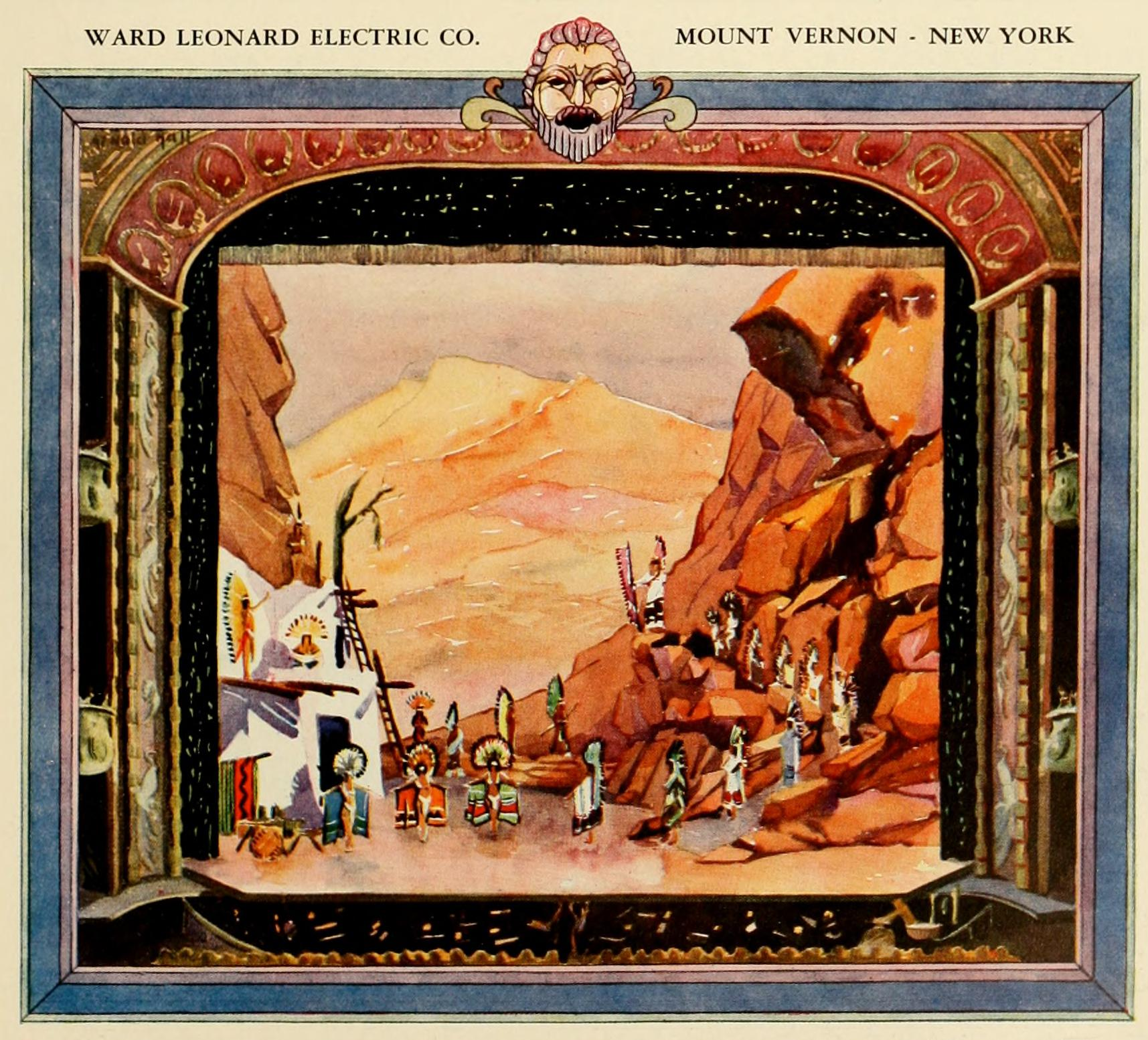
A scene as depicted in Motion Picture News

Whoopee! opened on Broadway at the New Amsterdam Theatre on December 4, 1928, and closed on November 23, 1929, after 407 performances. It was produced by Florenz Ziegfeld, directed by Seymour Felix, dialogue staged by William Anthony McGuire, and dances and ensembles staged by Seymour Felix. The musical starred Eddie Cantor as Henry Williams, Ruth Etting as Leslie Daw, Frances Upton as Sally Morgan, Jack Rutherford as Bob Wells, Paul Gregory as Wanenis and Ethel Shutta as Mary (replacing Ruby Keeler), and featured Buddy Ebsen and Paulette Goddard in the chorus. George Olsen (Ethel Shutta's husband) and His Orchestra provided the music for both the stage production and the movie.

Donald J. Stubblebine reports, "It was still going strong after six months but Sam Goldwyn, who bought the rights, closed it down to make the movie with Cantor." Whoopee! was filmed in 1930 as a musical comedy film. Although the plot followed the stage version closely, much of the music was changed.

=== 1979 Revival ===
A revival, based on a Goodspeed Opera House production, was presented at the ANTA Playhouse from February 14, 1979, to August 12, 1979, for 204 performances and 8 previews. Directed by Frank Corsaro with choreography by Dan Siretta, the cast featured Charles Repole (Henry Williams) Beth Austin (Sally Morgan), Carol Swarbrick (Mary) and Susan Stroman (Leslie Daw). This revival added Kahn/Donaldson songs not in the original 1928 show: "My Baby Just Cares For Me" (from the 1930 film version), "Yes, Sir, That's My Baby", and "You" (lyrics by Harold Adamson). Also, "Love Me or Leave Me" is sung by Mary and Henry rather than the essentially unrelated Leslie.

== Response ==
Brooks Atkinson, the theatre critic for The New York Times, reviewed the 1928 Broadway production and called it "a gorgeous spectacle" with "long stretches of excellent comedy". He especially praised the comedic abilities of Eddie Cantor, "a comedian of deftness and appealing humor. He is sad; he is preoccupied; he is apprehensive or insinuating with those floating eyes...In the past he has been funny, clever and ludicrious. But he has never been so enjoyable." As to the music, "Walter Donaldson has composed an appropriate score worthy of better singing than it falls heir to."

The New York Times critic Richard Eder called the 1979 Broadway revival a "frequent delight though not an unmitigated one...Most strikingly, it is a superabundance of songs. There is not a poor song in it, and its best ones — the lovely and musically witty "Makin' Whoopee", the jiggly "My Baby Just Cares for Me", and of course the irresistible "Yes Sir, That's My Baby" — are magnificent." Walter Kerr, then the Times' Sunday critic, also reacted favorably to the show while calling attention to its nonsensical frivolity: he deemed it "light as a breeze, and just plain out of its head." Brendan Gill of The New Yorker, however, panned the show.

Repole received a nomination for Drama Desk Award, Outstanding Actor in a Musical, and Dan Siretta was nominated for the Tony Award for Best Choreography.
