= William Anthony McGuire =

American dramatist

- Born: July 9, 1881; Chicago, Illinois, United States
- Died: September 16, 1940 (aged 59); Beverly Hills, California, United States
- Occupations: Playwright, theatre director, screenwriter

William Anthony McGuire (July 9, 1881 – September 16, 1940) was an American playwright, theatre director, and producer and screenwriter, including The Kid From Spain (1932) starring Eddie Cantor. McGuire earned an Oscar nomination for the 1936 film The Great Ziegfeld, the Best Picture Oscar winner of 1936.

Born in Chicago, Illinois, McGuire made his Broadway debut in 1910 as author of the play The Heights. He went on to write, direct, and produce Twelve Miles Out (1925) and If I Was Rich (1926) and write and direct Rosalie (1928), Whoopee! (1928), The Three Musketeers (1928), and Show Girl (1929).

McGuire is quoted by the gossip columnist Sidney Skolsky as saying of his profession and milieu, "Broadway's a great street when you're going up. When you're going down -- take Sixth Avenue."

McGuire died of uremia in Beverly Hills, California.
