= Eddie Cantor =

American comedian and actor (1892–1964)

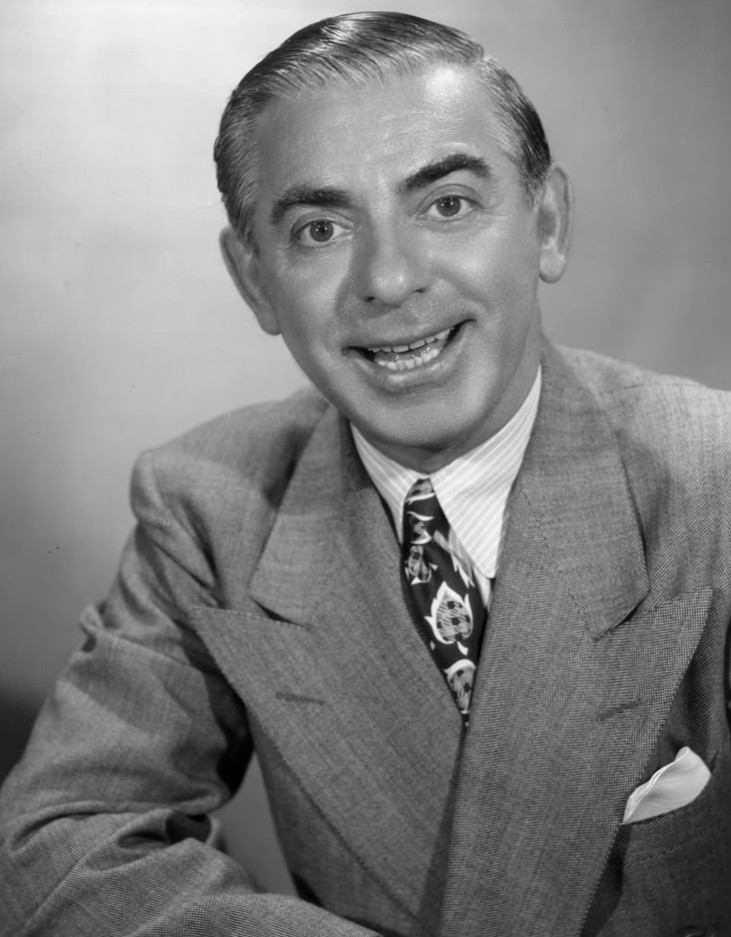
- Cantor in 1945
- Born: Isidore Itzkowitz; January 31, 1892; New York City, U.S.
- Died: October 10, 1964 (aged 72); Beverly Hills, California, U.S.
- Resting place: Hillside Memorial Park Cemetery in Culver City, California
- Occupations: Actor; comedian; dancer; singer; songwriter; film producer; screenwriter; author
- Years active: 1907–1962
- Spouse: Ida Tobias (m. 1914; died 1962)
- Children: 5

President of the Screen Actors Guild
- In office 1933–1935
- Preceded by: Ralph Morgan
- Succeeded by: Robert Montgomery

Eddie Cantor (born Isidore Itzkowitz; January 31, 1892 – October 10, 1964) was an American comedian, actor, dancer, singer, songwriter, film producer, screenwriter and author. Cantor was one of the prominent entertainers of his era.

Some of his hits include "Makin' Whoopee", "Ida (Sweet as Apple Cider)", "If You Knew Susie", "Ma! He's Making Eyes at Me", "Mandy", "My Baby Just Cares for Me", "Margie", and "How Ya Gonna Keep 'em Down on the Farm (After They've Seen Paree)?" He also wrote a few songs, including "Merrily We Roll Along", the Merrie Melodies Warner Bros. cartoon theme.

His eye-rolling song-and-dance routines eventually led to his nickname "Banjo Eyes". In 1933, artist Frederick J. Garner caricatured Cantor with large round eyes resembling the drum-like pot of a banjo. Cantor's eyes became his trademark, often exaggerated in illustrations, and leading to his appearance on Broadway in the musical Banjo Eyes (1941).

He helped to develop the March of Dimes and is credited with coining its name. Cantor was awarded an honorary Oscar in 1956 for distinguished service to the film industry.

== Early life ==
Reports and accounts of Cantor's early life often conflict with one another. He was born in New York City, the son of Mechel (a.k.a. Michael) Iskowitz, an amateur violinist; and his wife (a.k.a. Maite) Meta Kantrowitz Iskowitz, a young Jewish couple from Russia. It is generally accepted that he was born in 1892, though the day is subject to debate, with either January 31 or Rosh Hashanah, which was on September 10 or September 11, being reported. Although it was reported Cantor was an orphan, his mother dying in childbirth and his father of pneumonia, official records say otherwise; Meta died from complications of tuberculosis in July 1894, and the fate of Mechel is unclear, as no death certificate exists for him. There is also discrepancy as to his name; both his 1957 autobiography and The New York Times obituary for Cantor report his birth name as Isidore Iskowitch, although some articles published after the 20th century give his birth name as Edward (a nickname given him by his future wife, Ida, in 1913) or Israel Itzkowitz. His grandmother, Esther Kantrowitz (died January 29, 1917), took custody of him, and referred to him as Izzy and Itchik (both diminutives for Isidor), and his last name, due to a clerical error, was thought to be Kantrowitz and shortened to Kanter. No birth certificate existed for him, though this is not unusual for someone born in New York in the 19th century.

== Stage ==
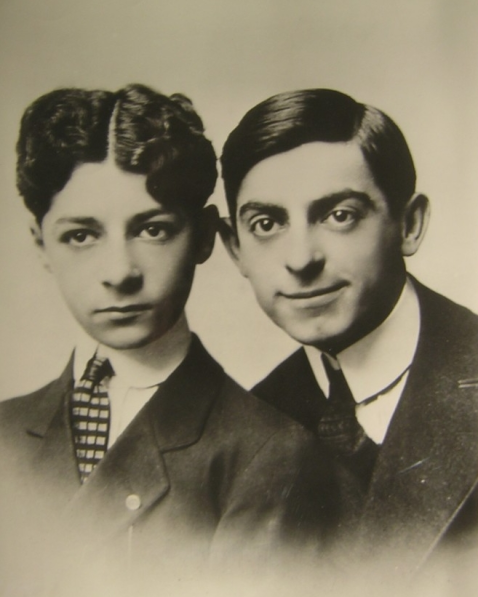
George Jessel and Eddie Cantor, while in Kid Kabaret, c. 1913

=== Songs to vaudeville ===
By his early teens, Cantor began winning talent contests at local theaters and started appearing on stage. One of his earliest paying jobs was doubling as a waiter and performer, singing for tips at Carey Walsh's Coney Island saloon, where a young Jimmy Durante accompanied him on piano. He made his first public appearance in Vaudeville in 1907 at New York's Clinton Music Hall. In 1912, he was the only performer over the age of 20 to appear in Gus Edwards's Kid Kabaret, where he created his first blackface character "Jefferson". He later toured with Al Lee as the team Cantor and Lee. Critical praise from that show got the attention of Broadway's top producer Florenz Ziegfeld, who gave Cantor a spot in the Ziegfeld rooftop post-show, Midnight Frolic (1917).

=== Broadway ===
A year later, Cantor made his Broadway debut in the Ziegfeld Follies of 1917. He continued in the Follies until 1927, a period considered the best years of the long-running revue. For several years, Cantor co-starred in an act with pioneer comedian Bert Williams, both appearing in blackface; Cantor played Williams's fresh-talking son. Other co-stars with Cantor during his time in the Follies included Will Rogers, Marilyn Miller, Fanny Brice, and W.C. Fields. He moved on to stardom in book musicals, starting with Kid Boots (1923) and Whoopee! (1928). The successful Broadway run of Banjo Eyes was cut short when Cantor suffered a major heart attack, the first of several that would plague his later years.

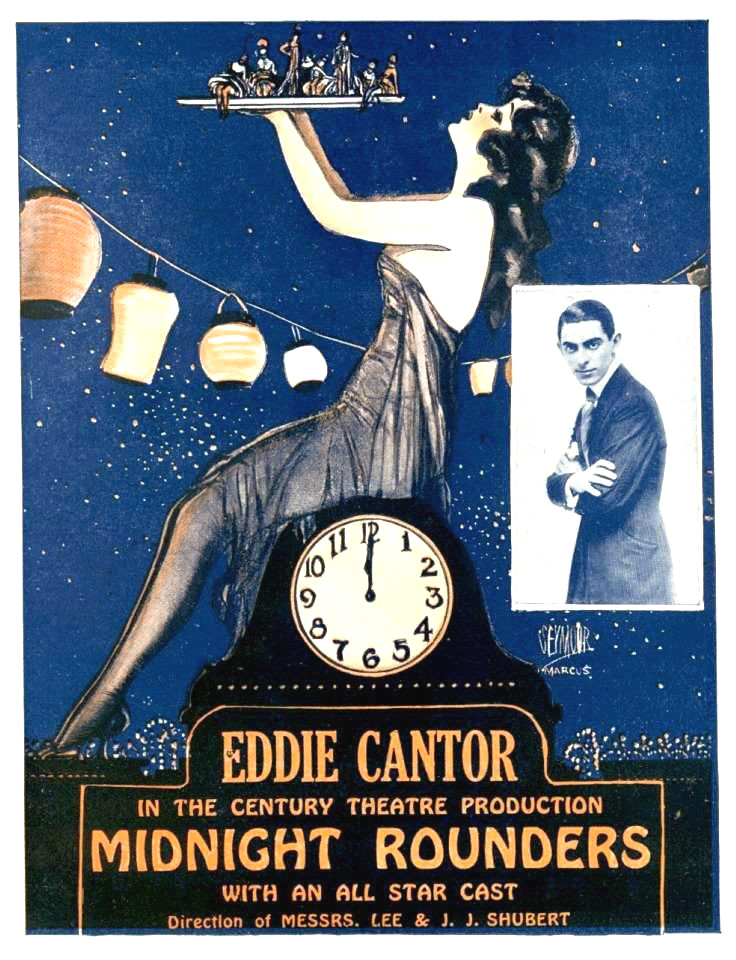
Flyer for Midnight Rounders

- Ziegfeld Follies of 1917 – revue – performer
- Ziegfeld Follies of 1918 – revue – performer, co-composer and co-lyricist for "Broadway's Not a Bad Place After All" with Harry Ruby
- Ziegfeld Follies of 1919 – revue – performer, lyricist for "(Oh! She's the) Last Rose of Summer"
- Ziegfeld Follies of 1920 – revue – composer for "Green River", composer and lyricist for "Every Blossom I See Reminds Me of You" and "I Found a Baby on My Door Step"
- The Midnight Rounders of 1920 – revue – performer
- Broadway Brevities of 1920 – revue – performer
- Make It Snappy (1922) – revue – performer, co-bookwriter
- Ziegfeld Follies of 1923 – revue – sketch writer
- Kid Boots (1923) – musical comedy – actor in the role of "Kid Boots" (the Caddie Master)
- Ziegfeld Follies of 1927 – revue – performer, co-bookwriter
- Whoopee! (1928) – musical comedy – actor in the role of "Henry Williams"
- Eddie Cantor at the Palace (1931) – solo performance
- Banjo Eyes (1941) – musical comedy – actor in the role of "Erwin Trowbridge"
- Nellie Bly (1946) – musical comedy – co-producer

== Radio and recordings ==
=== Radio ===
Cantor appeared on radio as early as February 3, 1922, as indicated by this news item from Connecticut's Bridgeport Telegram:

Local radio operators listened to one of the finest programs yet produced over the radiophone last night. The program of entertainment which included some of the stars of Broadway musical comedy and vaudeville was broadcast from the Newark, New Jersey station WDY and the Pittsburgh, Pennsylvania station KDKA, both of the Westinghouse Electric and Manufacturing Company. The Newark entertainment started at 7 o'clock: a children's half-hour of music and fairy stories; 7:[35?], Hawaiian airs and violin solo; 8:00, news of the day; and at 8:20, a radio party with nationally known comedians participating; 9:55, Arlington time signals and 10:01, a government weather report. G.E. Nothnagle, who conducts a radiophone station at his home 176 Waldemere Avenue said last night that he was delighted with the program, especially with the numbers sung by Eddie Cantor. The weather conditions are excellent for receiving, he continued, the tone and the quality of the messages was fine.

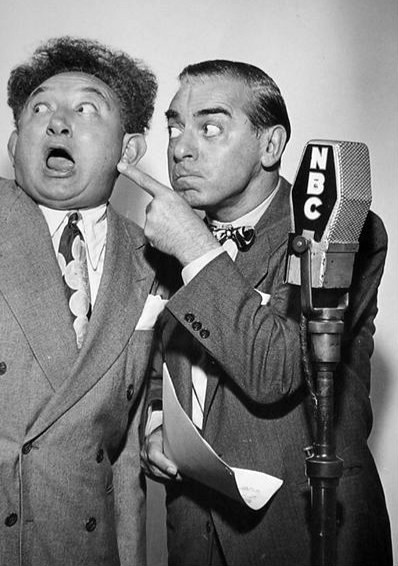
Cantor (right) with Bert Gordon, AKA "the Mad Russian"

Cantor's appearance with Rudy Vallee on Vallee's The Fleischmann's Yeast Hour on February 5, 1931, led to a four-week tryout with The Chase and Sanborn Hour. Replacing Maurice Chevalier, who was returning to Paris, Cantor joined Chase and Sanborn on September 13, 1931. This hour-long Sunday evening variety series teamed Cantor with announcer Jimmy Wallington and violinist Dave Rubinoff. The show established Cantor as a leading comedian, and his scriptwriter, David Freedman, as "the Captain of Comedy". Freedman's team included, among others, Samuel "Doc" Kurtzman, who also wrote for song-and-dance man, Al Jolson, and the comedian Jack Benny. Cantor soon became the world's highest-paid radio star. His shows began with a crowd chanting "We want Can-tor! We want Can-tor!", a phrase said to have originated in vaudeville, when the audience chanted to chase off an act on the bill before Cantor. Cantor's theme song was his own lyric to the Leo Robin/Richard Whiting song, "One Hour with You". His radio sidekicks included Bert Gordon, (comic Barney Gorodetsky, AKA The Mad Russian) and Harry Parke (better known as Parkyakarkus). Cantor also discovered and helped guide the career of singer Dinah Shore, first featuring her on his radio show in 1940, as well as other performers, including Deanna Durbin, Bobby Breen in 1936, and Eddie Fisher in 1949.

Indicative of his effect on the mass audience, he agreed in November 1934 to introduce a new song by the songwriters J. Fred Coots and Haven Gillespie that other well-known artists had rejected as being "silly" and "childish". The song, "Santa Claus Is Comin' to Town", immediately had orders for 100,000 copies of sheet music the next day. It sold 400,000 copies by Christmas of that year.

His NBC radio show Time to Smile was broadcast from 1940 to 1946, followed by his Pabst Blue Ribbon Show from 1946 through 1949. The Pabst program ended when the sponsor wanted Cantor to add a weekly television program. Cantor refused to take on the additional broadcast. The trade publication Billboard reported that Cantor and Pabst "parted friends" after "several months of negotiation." He also served as emcee of Take It or Leave It during 1949–1950, and hosted a weekly disc jockey program for Philip Morris during the 1952–1953 season. In addition to film and radio, Cantor recorded for Hit of the Week Records, then again for Columbia, for Banner and Decca and various small labels.

In the early 1960s, he syndicated the short radio segment "Ask Eddie Cantor".

His heavy political involvement began early in his career, including his participation in the strike to form Actors Equity in 1919, provoking the anger of father figure and producer, Florenz Ziegfeld. At the 1939 New York World's Fair, Cantor publicly denounced antisemitic radio personality Father Charles Coughlin and then was dropped by his radio sponsor Camel cigarettes. A year and a half later, Cantor was able to return to the air because of help from his friend Jack Benny.

=== Recordings ===
Cantor began making phonograph records in 1917, recording both comedy songs and routines and popular songs of the day, first for Victor, then for Aeoleon-Vocalion, Pathé, and Emerson. From 1921 through 1925, he had an exclusive contract with Columbia Records, returning to Victor for the remainder of the decade.

A 1922 recording by Cantor

Sophie, from Make It Snappy, recorded in 1922
- file
- help

Cantor was one of the era's most successful entertainers, but the 1929 stock market crash took away his multimillionaire status and left him deeply in debt. However, Cantor's relentless attention to his own earnings to avoid the poverty he knew growing up caused him to use his writing talent, quickly building a new bank account with his highly popular, bestselling books of humor and cartoons about his experience, Caught Short! A Saga of Wailing Wall Street in 1929 "A.C." (After Crash), and Yoo-Hoo, Prosperity!

Cantor was also a composer, with his most famous song seldom attributed to him. In 1935, along with Charles Tobias (Ida's brother) and Murray Mencher, Cantor wrote "Merrily We Roll Along". It was adapted as the theme song for the Merrie Melodies series of animated cartoons, distributed by Warner Brothers Pictures between 1936 and 1964. Cantor himself was frequently caricatured in Warner cartoons of the period, (see Film and television: Animation).

He would have big success with his album The Eddie Cantor Story, which would reach No. 7 in the US.

== Motion pictures ==
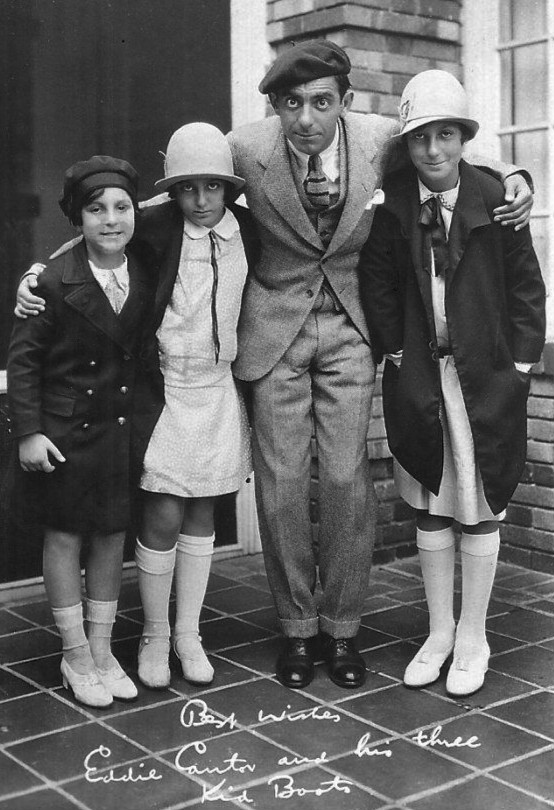
Cantor and three of his daughters strike a pose in 1926 to promote his first film, Kid Boots, and children's shoes.

Cantor also made numerous film appearances. In 1923 he performed songs and jokes in a then-experimental talking picture, A Few Moments with Eddie Cantor, produced by inventor Lee de Forest. Paramount Pictures starred him in two silent features, Kid Boots (1926) and Special Delivery (1927).

Warner Bros. was preparing The Jazz Singer, the first feature-length film with talking scenes. The studio offered the leading role to George Jessel and then to Eddie Cantor, both of whom declined.

Beginning in 1929 Paramount's New York studio enlisted radio and stage stars (Cantor, Burns and Allen, Jack Benny, Rudy Vallee, Fred Allen, and Ethel Merman, among others) to star in short-subject comedies and musicals. Cantor made three for Paramount: A Ziegfeld Midnight Frolic (1929), a re-creation of Cantor's nightclub act, with the comedian delivering a monologue to a live audience; Getting a Ticket (1929), a comedy sketch with Eddie running afoul of a traffic cop; and Insurance (1930), with Eddie visiting a doctor for an insurance examination. Cantor also made a guest appearance in the New York-filmed Paramount feature Glorifying the American Girl (1929).

Cantor in a 1929 musical-comedy short, Getting a Ticket

Eddie Cantor became a leading Hollywood star in 1930 with the film version of Whoopee!, produced in two-color Technicolor by Samuel Goldwyn. Cantor played his stage role of a nervous hypochondriac visiting a dude ranch. Cantor remained with Goldwyn, starring in one major motion picture annually through 1935: Palmy Days (1931), with hapless Eddie foiling a spiritualism racket; The Kid from Spain (1932), with Eddie having to substitute for a matador; Roman Scandals (1933), with Eddie in period costume battling politicos in ancient Rome; Kid Millions (1934), with swindlers trying to relieve Eddie of his inheritance; and Strike Me Pink (1935), with Eddie's amusement park being targeted by gangsters. Every film had comic songs by Cantor and elaborate musical numbers, often with The Goldwyn Girls.

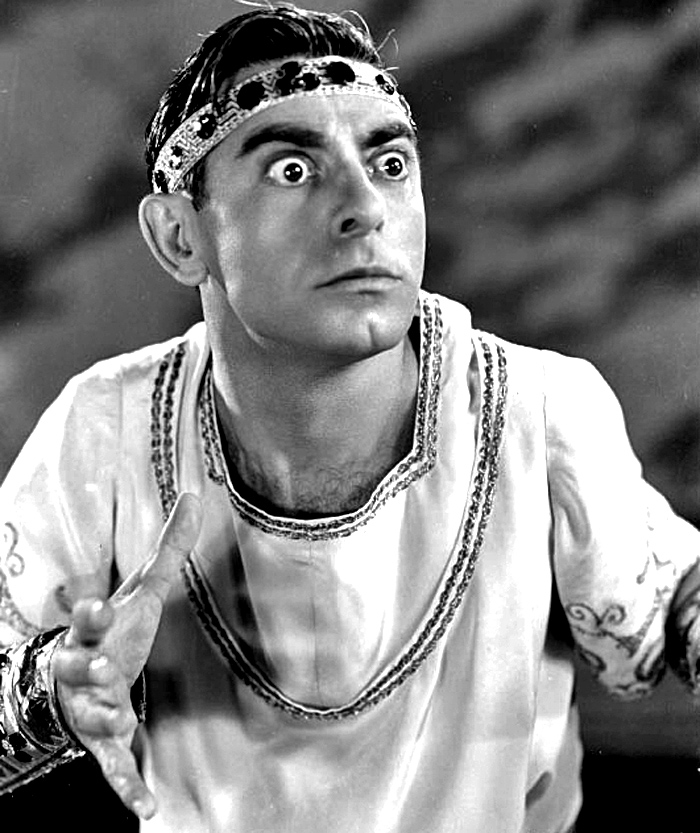
in Roman Scandals (1933)

After the Goldwyn contract ran out, Cantor made movies only occasionally. He was off the screen in 1936, but returned the next year for 20th Century-Fox in Ali Baba Goes to Town (1937; vagabond Eddie blunders into a movie company making an Arabian Nights story). Cantor also busied himself with behind-the-scenes work for the studio but didn't make another film for Fox. He explained in a letter to Variety: "Darryl Zanuck and I disagreed over my next story... I want to sing and I want to play something else besides an insipid character which the audience does not believe."

Cantor got his wish in 1940, in a drastic change from his past pictures. He and Ida saw a French picture about a downtrodden school teacher and prevailed upon Metro-Goldwyn-Mayer to buy the American rights. The Cantor version, Forty Little Mothers, was a sentimental story about a down-on-his-luck professor and an abandoned baby left in his care. In an effective change of pace, Cantor had several dramatic scenes and sang only one song. Exhibitor response was mixed; one raved, "This was an entirely different Cantor picture. That fellow really has the job in hand." but one was more pointed: "Fairly good picture but Eddie Cantor does not mean a thing anymore." Cantor himself came to regard the film as a flop.

Warner Bros. hired him for two all-star productions, Thank Your Lucky Stars (1943) and Hollywood Canteen (1944).

Eddie Cantor became his own producer for RKO Radio Pictures and filmed his own salute to vaudeville, Show Business, co-starring Cantor with physical comedian Joan Davis and his song-and-dance colleague from Kid Millions, George Murphy. During this period Joan Davis was regularly featured on Cantor's Time to Smile radio program. Davis had an affair with Cantor over the course of four years. Writer Budd Schulberg commented, "Everybody knew about the affair with Joan Davis -- everybody in the business." The relationship culminated in her divorce from Si Wills in December 1947, while the Cantor-Davis film If You Knew Susie was in production. After the divorce was finalized and the picture was completed, Davis and Cantor went their separate ways, and Cantor never starred in another motion picture.

== Television ==
On May 25, 1944, pioneer television station WPTZ (now KYW-TV) in Philadelphia presented a special, all-star telecast which was also seen in New York over WNBT (now WNBC) and featured cut-ins from their Rockefeller Center studios. Cantor, one of the first major stars to agree to appear on television, was to sing "We're Havin' a Baby, My Baby and Me". Arriving shortly before airtime at the New York studios, Cantor was reportedly told to cut the song because the NBC New York censors considered some of the lyrics too risqué. Cantor refused, claiming no time to prepare an alternative number. NBC relented, but the sound was cut and the picture blurred on certain lines in the song. This is considered the first instance of television censorship.

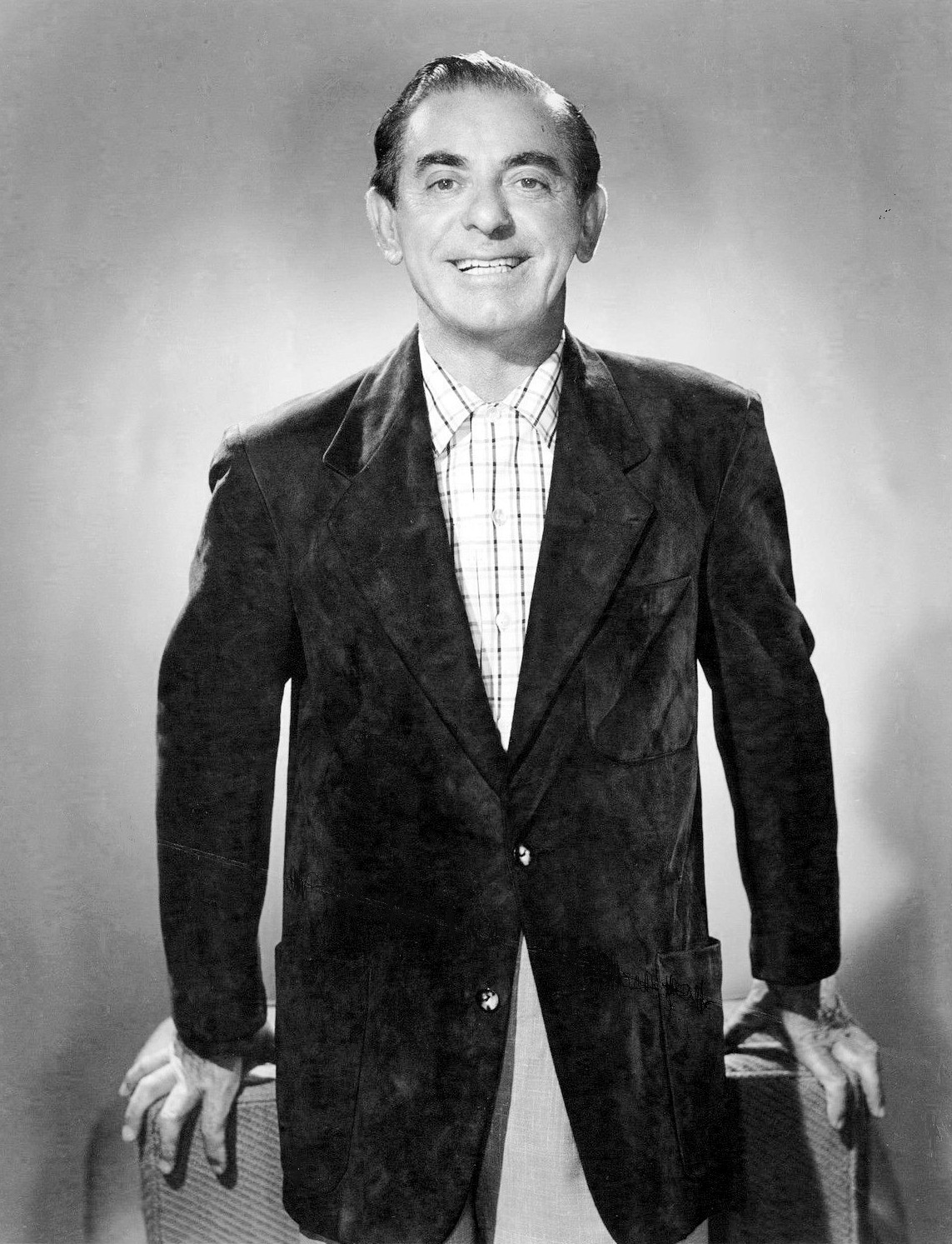
Cantor as host of The Colgate Comedy Hour, 1952

From 1950 to 1954, Cantor was a regular guest host on the television variety series The Colgate Comedy Hour. In 1950, he became the first of several hosts alternating on the NBC television variety show The Colgate Comedy Hour, in which he would introduce musical acts, stage and film stars and play comic characters such as "Maxie the Taxi". In the spring of 1952, Cantor landed in an unlikely controversy when a young Sammy Davis Jr., appeared as a guest performer. Cantor embraced Davis and mopped Davis's brow with his handkerchief after his performance. When worried sponsors led NBC to threaten cancellation of the show, Cantor's response was to book Davis for two more weeks. Cantor suffered a heart attack following a September 1952 Colgate broadcast, and thereafter, curtailed his appearances until his final program in 1954. In 1955, he appeared in a filmed series for syndication and a year later, appeared in two dramatic roles ("George Has A Birthday", on NBC's Matinee Theatre broadcast in color, and "Size.man and Son" on CBS's Playhouse 90). He continued to appear as a guest on several shows, and was last seen on the NBC color broadcast of The Future Lies Ahead on January 22, 1960, which also featured Mort Sahl.

=== Animation ===
Cantor appears in caricature form in numerous Looney Tunes cartoons produced for Warner Bros., although he was often voiced by an imitator. Beginning with I Like Mountain Music (1933), other animated Cantor cameos include Shuffle Off to Buffalo (1933) and Billboard Frolics (1935). Eddie Cantor is one of the four "down on their luck" stars (along with Bing Crosby, Al Jolson, and Jack Benny) snubbed by Elmer Fudd in What's Up, Doc? (1950). In Farm Frolics (1941), a horse, asked by the narrator to "do a canter", promptly launches into a singing, dancing, eye-rolling impression. The Cantor gag that got the most mileage, however, was his oft-repeated wish for a son after five famous daughters. Slap Happy Pappy (1940) features an "Eddie Cackler" rooster that wants a boy, to little avail. Other references can be found in Baby Bottleneck (1946) and Circus Today (1940). In Merrie Melodies, The Coo-Coo Nut Grove, Cantor's many daughters are referenced by a group of singing quintuplet girls. In Porky's Naughty Nephew (Clampett, 1938) a swimming Cantor gleefully adopts a "buoy". An animated Cantor also appears prominently in Walt Disney's "Mother Goose Goes Hollywood" (1938) as Little Jack Horner, who sings "Sing a Song of Sixpence".

== Books and merchandising ==
Cantor's popularity led to merchandising of such products as Eddie Cantor's Tell It to the Judge game from Parker Brothers. In 1933, Brown and Bigelow published a set of 12 Eddie Cantor caricatures by Frederick J. Garner. The advertising cards were purchased in bulk as a direct-mail item by such businesses as auto body shops, funeral directors, dental laboratories, and vegetable wholesale dealers. With the full set, companies could mail a single Cantor card each month for a year to their selected special customers as an ongoing promotion. Cantor was often caricatured on the covers of sheet music and in magazines and newspapers. Cantor was depicted as a balloon in the Macy's Thanksgiving Day Parade, one of the very few balloons based on a real person.

In addition to Caught Short!, Cantor wrote or co-wrote at least seven other books, including booklets released by the then-fledgling firm of Simon & Schuster, with Cantor's name on the cover. (Some were "as told to" or written with David Freedman.) Customers paid a dollar and received the booklet with a penny embedded in the hardcover. They sold well, and H.L. Mencken asserted that the books did more to pull America out of the Great Depression than all government measures combined.

== Activism, politics and philanthropy ==
Cantor was a lifelong Democrat and friend of U.S. President Franklin Roosevelt.

Cantor was the second president of the Screen Actors Guild, serving from 1933 to 1935.

He invented the title "The March of Dimes" for the donation campaigns of the National Foundation for Infantile Paralysis, which was organized to combat polio. It was a play on The March of Time newsreels popular at the time. He began the first campaign on his radio show in January 1938, asking listeners to mail a dime to President Franklin D. Roosevelt. At that time, Roosevelt was the most notable American victim of polio. Other entertainers joined in the appeal via their own shows, and the White House mail room was deluged with 2,680,000 dimes—a large sum at the time.

Cantor also recorded a spoken introduction on a 1938 Decca recording of "Alexander's Ragtime Band" by Bing Crosby and Connee Boswell in which he thanks the listener for buying the record, which supported the National Foundation for Infantile Paralysis. The record was a success, though Cantor did not sing on it.

== Tributes ==
Cantor was profiled on This Is Your Life, a program in which an unsuspecting person (usually a celebrity) would be surprised on live television by host Ralph Edwards, with a half-hour tribute. Cantor was the only subject who was told of the "surprise" in advance; he was recovering from a heart attack, and it was felt that the shock might harm him.

In 1951 he received an honorary doctorate from Temple University.

There was an Eddie Cantor caricature featured in Comedy Store, and flashing lights on it marked the end of auditions for comedians.

Warner Bros., in an attempt to duplicate the box-office success of The Jolson Story, filmed a big-budget Technicolor feature film The Eddie Cantor Story (1953). The film found an audience but might have done better with someone else in the leading role. Actor Keefe Brasselle was considerably taller than Cantor and played him as a caricature with bulging eyes and busy hands, which was fine for the song numbers but awkward in the dramatic scenes. Eddie and Ida Cantor were seen in a brief prologue and epilogue set in a projection room, where they are watching Brasselle in action; at the end of the film, Eddie tells Ida "I never looked better in my life" and gives the audience a knowing, incredulous look. George Burns, in his memoir All My Best Friends, claimed that Warner Bros. created a miracle producing the movie in that "it made Eddie Cantor's life boring".

Probably the best summary of Cantor's career is on one of the Colgate Comedy Hour shows. Re-issued on DVD as Eddie Cantor in Person, the hour-long episode is a virtual video autobiography, with Eddie recounting his career, singing his greatest hits, and recreating his singing-waiter days with another vaudeville legend, his old pal Jimmy Durante.

Cantor appears as a recurring character, played by Stephen DeRosa, on the series Boardwalk Empire.

== Personal life and family ==
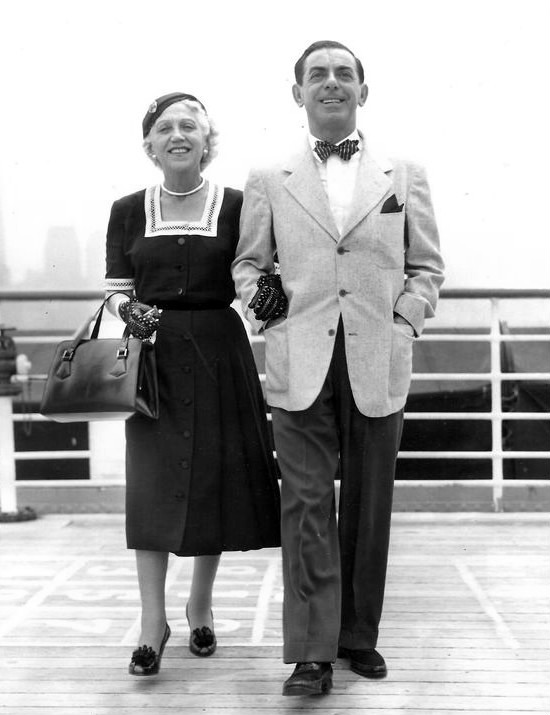
The Cantors in 1952

Cantor adopted the first name "Eddie" when he met his future wife Ida Tobias in 1913, because she felt that "Izzy" was not the right name for an actor. Cantor and Ida (1892–1962) were married on June 6, 1914. They had five daughters – Marjorie (1915–1959), Natalie (1916–1997), Edna June (1919–2003), Marilyn (1921–2010), and Janet (1927–2018). The girls provided comic fodder for Cantor's longtime running gag, especially on radio, about his five unmarriageable daughters. Several radio historians, including Gerald Nachman (in his book Raised on Radio), have said that this gag did not always sit well with the girls.

Natalie's first husband was Joseph Louis Metzger, a businessman from Boston; they married in 1937. Her second husband was the French-born American actor Robert Clary, who was best known for his role as Corporal Louis LeBeau on Hogan's Heroes. Edna married James Francis McHugh Jr., in 1938. McHugh Sr. was a songwriter who was close friends with Eddie Cantor. Janet married the actor Roberto Gari. Marilyn married a Canadian, Michael Baker, in 1960. She was the only child in the family to follow her father into show business.

Following the death of their daughter Marjorie at the age of 44, Eddie's and Ida's health declined rapidly. She had been her father's secretary and a magazine writer. Ida died on August 9, 1962, at age 70 of "cardiac insufficiency", and Eddie died on October 10, 1964, in Beverly Hills, California, after suffering his second heart attack at age 72. He is interred in Hillside Memorial Park Cemetery, a Jewish cemetery in Culver City, California.

Cantor was a Freemason via Munn Lodge No. 190 in New York City.

== Filmography ==
- A Few Moments With Eddie Cantor, Star of "Kid Boots" (1923, DeForest Phonofilm sound-on-film short film) as Himself
- Kid Boots (1926) as Samuel (Kid) Boots
- Special Delivery (1927) as Eddie Beagle – the Mail Carrier
- That Party in Person (1929, short) as Eddie Cantor
- A Ziegfeld Midnight Frolic (1929, short) as Himself
- Glorifying the American Girl (1929) as Eddie Cantor – Appearance in Revue Scenes
- Getting a Ticket (1929, short) as Himself
- Insurance (1930, short) as Sidney B. Zwieback
- Whoopee! (1930) as Henry Williams
- Palmy Days (1931) as Eddie Simpson
- Talking Screen Snapshots (1932, documentary short) as Himself
- The Kid from Spain (1932) as Eddie Williams
- Roman Scandals (1933) as Eddie / Oedipus
- The Hollywood Gad-About (1934, documentary short) as Himself (uncredited)
- Kid Millions (1934) as Eddie Wilson Jr.
- Strike Me Pink (1936) as Eddie Pink
- Ali Baba Goes to Town (1937) as Ali Baba
- The March of Time Volume IV, Issue 5 (1937, documentary short) as Himself
- Forty Little Mothers (1940) as Gilbert Jordan Thompson
- Thank Your Lucky Stars (1943) as Eddie Cantor / Joe Simpson
- Show Business (1944, also producer) as Eddie Martin
- Hollywood Canteen (1944) as Himself
- Screen Snapshots: Radio Shows (1945, short) as Eddie – The Eddie Cantor Program
- American Creed (1946, short) as Self
- Meet Mr. Mischief (1947, short, appears on poster) as Face on Station Program Poster (uncredited)
- If You Knew Susie (1948) as Sam Parker
- Screen Snapshots: Hollywood's Happy Homes (1949, documentary short) as Himself
- The Story of Will Rogers (1952) as Himself
- Screen Snapshots: Memorial to Al Jolson (1952, documentary short) as Himself
- The Eddie Cantor Story (1953) cameo appearance and singing voice dubbing for Keefe Brasselle

== Bibliography ==
- My Life Is in Your Hands by Eddie Cantor (1928) with David Freedman; Harper & Bros.
- Caught Short!: A Saga of Wailing Wall Street by Eddie Cantor (1929) Simon & Schuster
- Between the Acts by Eddie Cantor (1930) Simon & Schuster
- Yoo-Hoo, Prosperity!: The Eddie Cantor Five-Year Plan by Eddie Cantor (1931) with David Freedman; Simon & Schuster
- The Rise of the Goldbergs by Gertrude Berg (1931) Foreword by Eddie Cantor; Barse & Co.
- Your Next President! by Eddie Cantor (1932) with David Freedman, Illus. by S.L. Hydeman; Ray Long & Richard R. Smith, Inc.
- Eddie Cantor in An Hour with You: A Big Little Book (1934) Whitman
- Eddie Cantor Song and Joke Book (1934) Illus. by Ben Harris; M. Witmark & Sons
- Ziegfeld: The Great Glorifier by Eddie Cantor (1934) with David Freedman; Alfred H. King
- World's Book of Best Jokes by Eddie Cantor (1943) World Publishing Co.
- Hello, Momma by George Jessel (1946) Foreword by Eddie Cantor, Illus. by Carl Rose; World Publishing Co.
- Take My Life by Eddie Cantor (1957) with Jane Kesner Ardmore; Doubleday
- No Man Stands Alone by Barney Ross (1957) Foreword by Eddie Cantor; B. Lippincott Co.
- The Way I See It by Eddie Cantor (1959) with Phyllis Rosenteur, ed.; Prentice-Hall
- As I Remember Them by Eddie Cantor (1963) Duell, Sloan & Pearce
- Yoo-Hoo, Prosperity! and Caught Short! by Eddie Cantor (1969) Greenwood Press
- "The Eddie Cantor Story: A Jewish Life in Performance and Politics" by David Weinstein (2017) UPNE/Brandeis University Press
- The Golden Age of Sound Comedy: Comic Films and Comedians of the Thirties by Donald W. McCaffrey (1973) A.S. Barnes
- Radio Comedy by Arthur Frank Wertheim (1979) Oxford University Press
- The Vaudevillians: A Dictionary of Vaudeville Performers by Anthony Slide (1981) Arlington House
- American Vaudeville as Seen by Its Contemporaries by Charles W. Stein, ed. (1984) Alfred A. Knopf
- Eddie Cantor: A Life in Show Business by Gregory Koseluk (1995) McFarland
- Eddie Cantor: A Bio-Bibliography by James Fisher (1997) Greenwood Press
- Banjo Eyes: Eddie Cantor and the Birth of Modern Stardom by Herbert G. Goldman (1997) Oxford University Press
- The Great American Broadcast: A Celebration of Radio's Golden Age by Leonard Maltin (1997) Dutton
- My Life Is in Your Hands and Take My Life by Eddie Cantor (2000) Cooper Square Press
- Film Clowns of the Depression: Twelve Defining Comic Performances by Wes D. Gehring (2007) McFarland
- Eddie Cantor in Laugh Land by Harold Sherman (2008) Kessinger Publishing
- Angels We Have Heard: The Christmas Song Stories by James Adam Richliano (2002) Star Of Bethlehem Books (Includes a chapter on Cantor's involvement in the history of "Santa Claus Is Comin' To Town").
- The Eddie Cantor Story: A Jewish Life in Performance and Politics by David Weinstein (2018) UPNE/Brandeis University Press
