= I'll Be Home for Christmas =

1943 song first sung by Bing Crosby

- The original 1943 release by Bing Crosby with John Scott Trotter and His Orchestra on Decca, 18570A

Single by Bing Crosby
- B-side: Danny Boy
- Published: September 27, 1943 by Charles Warren, Hollywood
- Released: October 26, 1943
- Recorded: October 1, 1943
- Studio: Decca Recording Studio, Los Angeles, California
- Length: 2:58
- Label: Decca 18570
- Composer: Walter Kent
- Lyricists: Kim Gannon, Buck Ram

Bing Crosby singles chronology
"Pistol Packin' Mama" (1943)	"I'll Be Home for Christmas" (1943)	"I Love You / I'll Be Seeing You" (1944)

"I'll Be Home for Christmas" is a Christmas song written by the lyricist Kim Gannon and composer Walter Kent and recorded in 1943 by Bing Crosby, who scored a top ten hit with the song. Originally written to honor soldiers serving overseas in World War II who longed to be home at Christmas time, "I'll Be Home for Christmas" has since gone on to become a Christmas standard.

== Theme ==
The song is sung from the point of view of a soldier stationed overseas during World War II, writing a letter to his family. In the message, he tells his family he will be coming home and to prepare the holiday for him, and requests snow, mistletoe, and presents "on" the tree. The song ends on a melancholy note, with the soldier saying, "I'll be home for Christmas, if only in my dreams". The flip side of the original recording (Decca 18570B) was "Danny Boy".

== Writing and copyright ==
The song was written by the lyricist Kim Gannon and composer Walter Kent. Songwriter Buck Ram, known for his hits including "Only You", "The Great Pretender", "Twilight Time", and "The Magic Touch", wrote the original lyrics in 1922, while a student at the University of Illinois, as a poem for his mother. Kent and Gannon were acquaintances, and the three discussed the song during a chance meeting in a bar in 1941. A songwriter, producer and manager for groups that included the Platters, the Penguins, and the Flares, Ram was credited as a co-writer as a result of a lawsuit brought by his publisher, Mills Music. Bing Crosby's original 1943 release of the song on Decca Records listed only Walter Kent and Kim Gannon as the songwriters on the record label. Later pressings added the name of Buck Ram to the songwriting credit.

== Bing Crosby recording ==
On October 1, 1943, Crosby recorded the song under the title "I'll Be Home for Christmas (If Only in My Dreams)", with the John Scott Trotter Orchestra for Decca Records; it was released as a 78 rpm single, Decca 18570A, Matrix #L3203, and reissued in 1946 as Decca 23779. Within a month of release, the song charted for 11 weeks, with a peak at number three. The next year, the song reached number 16 on the charts.

The U.S. War Department also released Bing Crosby's performance of "I'll Be Home for Christmas" from the December 7, 1944, Kraft Music Hall broadcast with the Henderson Choir, J.S.T., on V-Disc, as U.S. Army V-Disc No. 441-B and U.S. Navy V-Disc No. 221B, Matrix #VP1253-D5TC206. The song from the broadcast has appeared in many Bing Crosby compilations.

In the midst of World War II, the song touched the hearts of Americans, both soldiers and civilians, and it earned Crosby his fifth gold record. "I'll Be Home for Christmas" became the most requested song at Christmas U.S.O. shows. The GI magazine Yank said Crosby "accomplished more for military morale than anyone else of that era".

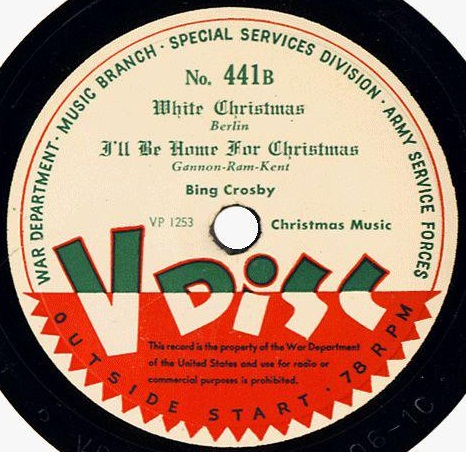
1945 V-Disc release by the U.S. Army of "White Christmas" and "I'll Be Home for Christmas" by Bing Crosby as No. 441B

Despite the song's popularity with Americans at the front and at home, in the UK, the BBC banned the song from broadcast, as the Corporation's management felt the lyrics might lower morale among British troops.

Seventy-seven years after its original release, Bing Crosby's "I'll Be Home for Christmas" debuted on the Billboard Hot 100 chart (at number 50 on the chart dated January 2, 2021).

=== Charts ===
Chart (1943–2026)	Peak position
Global 200 (Billboard)	95
US Billboard Hot 100	50
US Best Sellers in Stores (Billboard)	3
US Hot 100 Recurrents (Billboard)	13
US Streaming Songs (Billboard)	30
US Holiday 100 (Billboard)	28
US Rolling Stone Top 100	23

== Notable history and cover versions ==
Elvis Presley recorded the song in September 1957, and was featured on the LP Elvis' Christmas Album.

Singer Johnny Mathis also covered the song on his Merry Christmas album in 1958, which was the No. 2 Christmas album of 1963 and 1964 as there were no Christmas album rankings prior to 1963. In December 1965, astronauts Frank Borman and Jim Lovell, while on Gemini 7, requested "I'll Be Home for Christmas" be played for them by the NASA ground crew. Since the incarnation of the Billboard Hot 100 chart in 1958, cover versions by Cuban-American singer Camila Cabello and American singers Kelly Clarkson and Josh Groban are the only versions of the song to enter the chart.

American rock band the Killers recorded a cover of the song in 2016 for their Christmas compilation album Don't Waste Your Wishes, which featured "I'll Be Home for Christmas" as well as 10 other Christmas songs recorded by the Killers from 2006 to 2015.

Kelly Clarkson version

Chart (2011–2019)	Peak position
Finland Airplay (Radiosoittolista)	85
US Billboard Hot 100	93
US Adult Contemporary (Billboard)	7
US Holiday 100 (Billboard)	16

Michael Bublé version

Chart (2010–2022)	Peak position
Australia (ARIA)	70
Hungary (Stream Top 40)	40
Netherlands (Single Top 100)	71
Portugal (AFP)	145
Switzerland (Schweizer Hitparade)	82
US Holiday 100 (Billboard)	44
US Jazz Digital Songs (Billboard)	9

Brian McKnight version

Chart (2008–2009)	Peak position
US Adult Contemporary (Billboard)	14

Pentatonix version

Chart (2016)	Peak position
US Holiday Digital Songs (Billboard)	8

Seth MacFarlane version

Chart (2014–2015)	Peak position
US Adult Contemporary (Billboard)	28

Josh Groban version

Chart (2007–2008)	Peak position
Canada AC (Billboard)	45
US Billboard Hot 100	95
US Adult Contemporary (Billboard)	1
US Christian AC (Billboard)	44

Reba McEntire version

Chart (1998–1999)	Peak position
US Hot Country Songs (Billboard)	68

Rascal Flatts version

Chart (2008)	Peak position
US Hot Country Songs (Billboard)	34

Sara Evans version

Chart (2006–2007)	Peak position
US Hot Country Songs (Billboard)	46

Elvis Presley and Carrie Underwood version

Chart (2008–2009)	Peak position
US Hot Country Songs (Billboard)	54

Camila Cabello version

Chart (2021)	Peak position
Global 200 (Billboard)	108
Italy (FIMI)	92
UK Singles (OCC)	24
US Billboard Hot 100	71
US Holiday 100 (Billboard)	58

== Certifications and sales ==
=== Michael Bublé ===
Region	Certification	Certified units/sales
New Zealand (RMNZ)	Gold	15,000^{‡}
United Kingdom (BPI)	Silver	200,000^{‡}
^{‡} Sales+streaming figures based on certification alone.

== Sources ==
- Ewen, David, ed. (1966). American popular songs from the Revolutionary War to the present. New York: Random House. Call number: ML128 .N3 E9.
- Whitburn, Joel (1994). Joel Whitburn's pop hits, 1940–1954: compiled from Billboard's pop singles charts 1940–1954. Menomonee Falls, Wisconsin: Record Research. Call number: ML156.4 .P6 W495 1994.
