= Deaths in October 1978 =

The following is a list of notable deaths in October 1978. Entries for each day are listed alphabetically by surname. A typical entry lists information in the following sequence:

- Name, age, country of citizenship at birth, subsequent country of citizenship (if applicable), reason for notability, cause of death (if known), and reference.

== October 1978 ==
=== 1 ===
- Alfredo Obviar, 89, Filipino prelate of the Catholic Church,after living for more than 18 years as an administrator, Obviar was declared the first diocesan bishop of the Diocese of Lucena on July 15, 1969, he served as Bishop of Lucena until his retirement in 1976.

=== 4 ===
- Roy L. Dennis, 16, American teenager who suffered from craniodiaphyseal dysplasia, an extremely rare sclerotic bone disorder, he died alone in his own bedroom, having not interacted with anyone in his family since he complained about his headache on the previous evening.Peter Bogdanovich directed the drama film Mask (1985), from Anna Hamilton Phelan's screenplay, loosely based on Dennis's life. Most of the scenes and dialogue were altered for dramatic purposes.

=== 6 ===
- Johnny O'Keefe, 43, Australian rock and roll singer and television presenter, although he had helped the careers of many of his rock and roll contemporaries, O'Keefe was resistant to the changes in pop music and made himself unpopular amongst the newer music groups by banning "long-haired" acts, such as The Missing Links, from appearing on his show Sing Sing Sing, in early 1974, he scored his last big hit with a version of the old Inez and Charlie Foxx hit "Mockingbird", recorded as a duet with the vocalist Margaret McLaren,; it became his 29th Australian hit, reaching No. 8 nationally in April 1974, death caused by cardiovascular collapse, which was in turn caused by an overdose of prescription barbiturates and Methaqualone.

=== 8 ===
- Jim Gilliam, 49, American baseball player and coach, he was second baseman and third baseman in the Negro league and in Major League Baseball (MLB), he served as a player-coach in 1965-1966, and became a full-time first-base coach in 1967. he continued as a coach with the Los Angeles Dodgers until his death in 1978, including three more Dodger pennant teams in 1974, 1977, and 1978; they lost the World Series in each year.having suffered a massive brain hemorrhage in mid-September 1978 and having lapsed into a coma following a surgery, he died while still comatose.
- Karl Swenson, 70, American actor, he portrayed the title character of Father Brown in the 1945 radio program The Adventures of Father Brown, as well as the lead character in Mr. Chameleon, he voiced the character of Merlin in Walt Disney's 1963 animated classic, The Sword in the Stone,death due to a heart attack at Charlotte Hungerford Hospital in Torrington, Connecticut

=== 10 ===
- John Randolph Bray, 99, American animator, cartoonist, and film producer,eponymous founder of the studio Bray Productions,; unlike newspaper cartoonist Winsor McCay, who had been making short animated films for several years, Bray organized his studio according to the principles of industrial production, an approach that Raoul Barré, another animator, also adopted at around the same time,as the 1910s progressed, Bray's studio became a powerhouse in the early animation industry, the studio assembled a staff that included many accomplished animators, and it produced a steady and widely distributed stream of animated shorts, Bray himself contributed a series featuring his character Colonel Heeza Liar, which was among the most popular series of animated shorts in that era, Bray produced the first animated film in color, The Debut of Thomas Cat (1920), in Brewster Color.
- Ralph Metcalfe, 68, American politician and track and field sprinter, he served as the representative of Illinois's 1st congressional district from 1971 until his death in office in 1978,as a sprinter, Metcalfe had broken or equaled world record times at 16 different occasions; however, only 5 of these were ever officially ratified by the athletics governing body, the IAAF, death caused by his second-known heart attack.

=== 12 ===
- Nancy Spungen, 20, American stripper, groupie, and figure of the 1970s punk rock scene, death caused by a knife wound to her abdomen. Her dead body was found under the wash basin in the bathroom of her room at the Hotel Chelsea. Spungen's boyfriend Sid Vicious was immediately arrested and charged with second-degree murder, but he died of a heroin overdose prior to his trial taking place.There are various conflicting theories about the cause of Spungen's death. One theory attributed her death to the perpetrators of a robbery in her hotel room, as certain items, including a substantial amount of money, were claimed to be missing from the room. In his book Pretty Vacant: A History of Punk, Phil Strongman accused the actor and stand-up comic Rockets Redglare of killing Spungen; as Redglare delivered drugs to the couple's room on the night of Spungen's death.

=== 13 ===
- Roger Clark, 70, American actor,; in 1936, he was one of many young performers being signed to long-term contracts by the film studio Universal Pictures, between 1944 and 1952, Clark produced, directed and/or performed in six Broadway shows, death due to unspecified "long illness".

=== 15 ===
- W. Eugene Smith, 59, American photojournalist, his major photo-essays include World War II photographs, the visual stories of an American country doctor and a nurse midwife, the clinic of Albert Schweitzer in French Equatorial Africa, the city of Pittsburgh, and the pollution which damaged the health of the residents of Minamata in Japan, death caused by his second stroke, which took place about 10 months following his first one.

=== 16 ===
- Dan Dailey, 62, American actor and dancer, he was nominated for the Academy Award for Best Actor for his role as "Skid" Johnson in the musical film When My Baby Smiles at Me,death caused by complications following a hip-replacement surgery.

=== 17 ===
- Giovanni Gronchi, 91, Italian politician,he served as the president of Italy from 1955 until 1962,he was the first Catholic politician to become the head of state of Italy, he was elected with wide support in the Italian Parliament, through an unusual coalition of the right-wing faction of Christian Democracy, the trade-unionist left, and a number of communist, socialist, monarchist, and neo-fascist political factions.

=== 19 ===
- Gig Young, 64, American actor, he won the Academy Award for Best Supporting Actor for his role as Rocky Graver in the psychological drama film They Shoot Horses, Don't They? (1969), he was previously nominated twice for the same award, for his roles in Come Fill the Cup (1951) and Teacher's Pet (1958),he committed murder-suicide. Young shot his wife, the German magazine editor Kim Schmidt, in the back of the head with a .38 caliber Smith & Wesson pistol, and then shot himself in the mouth. The lethal bullet exited from the back of Young's head.

=== 20 ===
- Gunnar Nilsson, 29, Swedish racing driver, he competed in Formula One from 1976 to 1977, his debut season saw a podium finish at only his third Grand Prix, the 1976 Spanish Grand Prix,; he also scored another impressive third place in the 1976 Austrian Grand Prix, fifth in Germany and sixth in Japan, but the rest of the season was marred by accidents – in Belgium, Sweden, and Holland – and by car failures – in Monaco, France, England, and at Watkins Glen, death caused by testicular cancer.
- Renzo Ricci, 79, Italian actor and theatre director,he portrayed Italy's national hero Giuseppe Garibaldi in the film film Garibaldi (1961).
- Salka Viertel, 89, Austrian actress and screenwriter, she was a mentor and confidante to the Swedish actress Greta Garbo, and it was Garbo who encouraged Viertel to write screenplays as an alternative to film acting, the Viertel home became the site of salons and meetings of the émigré community of European intellectuals, along with Hollywood luminaries, particularly at Sunday night tea parties that Salka hosted, besides acting as a diplomat within the ethnically and politically diverse expatriate colony, Viertel also played a practical role as a go-between who could accelerate projects and careers,death caused by cancer.

=== 21 ===
- Anastas Mikoyan, 82, Soviet politician and diplomat, and previously a Bolshevik revolutionary, he served as the First Deputy Premier of the Soviet Union from 1955 until 1964,and as the head of state of the Soviet Union from 1964 until 1965,in 1956, Mikoyan helped Nikita Khrushchev organize his "Secret Speech", delivered before the 20th Party Congress, in which Khrushchev denounced Joseph Stalin's cult of personality,; it was Mikoyan, and not Khrushchev, who made the first anti-Stalinist speech at the 20th Congress, as Khrushchev's "point man on nationality matters", Mikoyan helped roll back some of the stifling restrictions on national cultures which had been imposed during Stalin's era, behind the scenes, Mikoyan assisted Armenian leaders in the rehabilitation of former "enemies" in the republic, and worked with Lev Shaumyan (son of Stepan), as well as the Gulag returnees Alexei Snegov and Olga Shatunovskaya on the process of de-Stalinization, death caused by unspecified "natural causes".

=== 22 ===
- Dorothy Shay, 57, American comedic recording artist and character actress, she signed with Columbia Records and recorded a series of hit records, her biggest hit was "Feudin' and Fightin'" in 1947, the year in which she joined Spike Jones's CBS radio show as the female vocalist,; that same year, her album, Dorothy Shay (the Park Avenue Hillbillie) Sings, was rated #1 in Billboard magazine's Best-Selling Popular Albums, Shay was the first female artist to have a #1 album on the Billboard chart, death due to a heart attack.

=== 23 ===
- Maybelle Carter, 69, American country musician and member of the music group Carter Family, she was reportedly among the first musicians who used the Carter Family picking, with which she helped popularize the guitar as a lead instrument."death due to a respiratory disease.

=== 24 ===
- Gloria Castillo, 45, American actress and businesswoman, she co-founded the women's clothing company Chessa Davis, skirts designed by Castillo were featured in fashion magazines and sold in department stores.

=== 28 ===
- Geoffrey Unsworth, 64, British cinematographer,after working on some of the Gainsborough melodramas, he worked at the Rank Organisation throughout the 1950s, notably on films such as A Town Like Alice (1956) and A Night to Remember (1958).

=== 30 ===
- Brian Hayles, 47, English screenwriter,he wrote six stories for Doctor Who and is best known for his creation of the character Celestial Toymaker in the 1966 story of the same name, the Ice Warriors, introduced in the 1967 story of the same name, and the feudal planet Peladon, the setting for The Curse of Peladon and its sequel The Monster of Peladon. His other stories were The Smugglers and The Seeds of Death.
- Wallace MacDonald, 87, Canadian silent film actor and film producer,late in World War I, he returned briefly to his native Nova Scotia to enlist in the 10th Canadian Siege Battery. where he assisted in recruiting for the Canadian Army.

== Sources ==
- Cohen, Stephen F. (2011). The Victims Return: Survivors of the Gulag After Stalin. London: I.B. Tauris. ISBN 9781848858480.
- Hambardzumyan, Viktor, ed. (1981). "Միկոյան, Անաստաս Հովհաննեսի". Soviet Armenian Encyclopedia (in Armenian). Vol. 7. Yerevan: Armenian Academy of Sciences.
- McFarlane, Ian (1999). Encyclopedia of Australian Rock and Pop. Allen & Unwin, St Leonards, NSW. ISBN 1-86508-072-1.
- Shakarian, Pietro A. (2025). Anastas Mikoyan: An Armenian Reformer in Khrushchev's Kremlin. Bloomington: Indiana University Press. ISBN 978-0253073556.
- Smith, Kathleen E. (2017). Moscow 1956: The Silenced Spring. Cambridge, MA: Harvard University Press. ISBN 9780674972001.
