= List of Billboard Best-Selling Popular Record Albums number ones of 1948 =

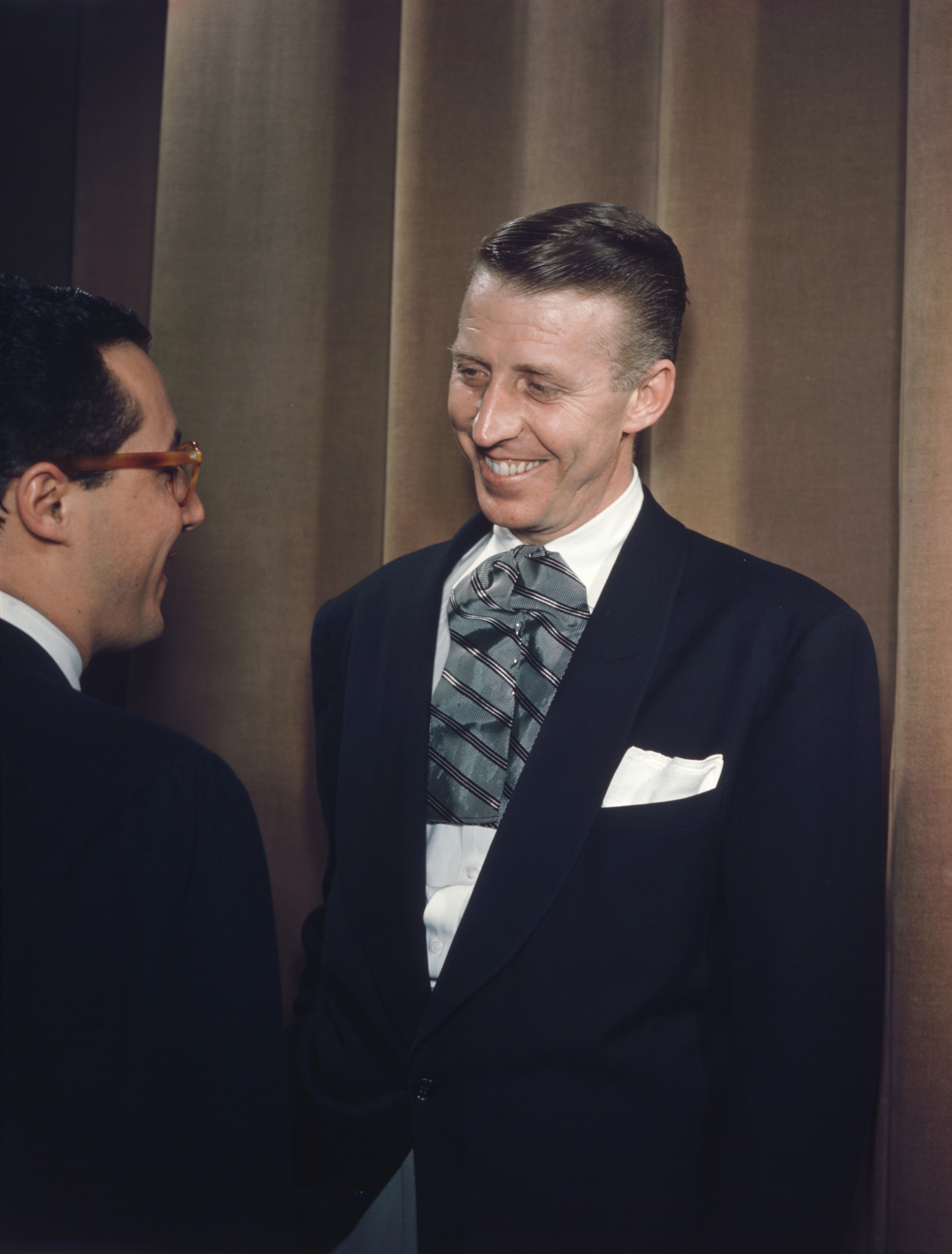
Stan Kenton's (pictured in 1948; right) A Presentation of Progressive Jazz was the best-selling album of the year and topped the chart for eight consecutive weeks.

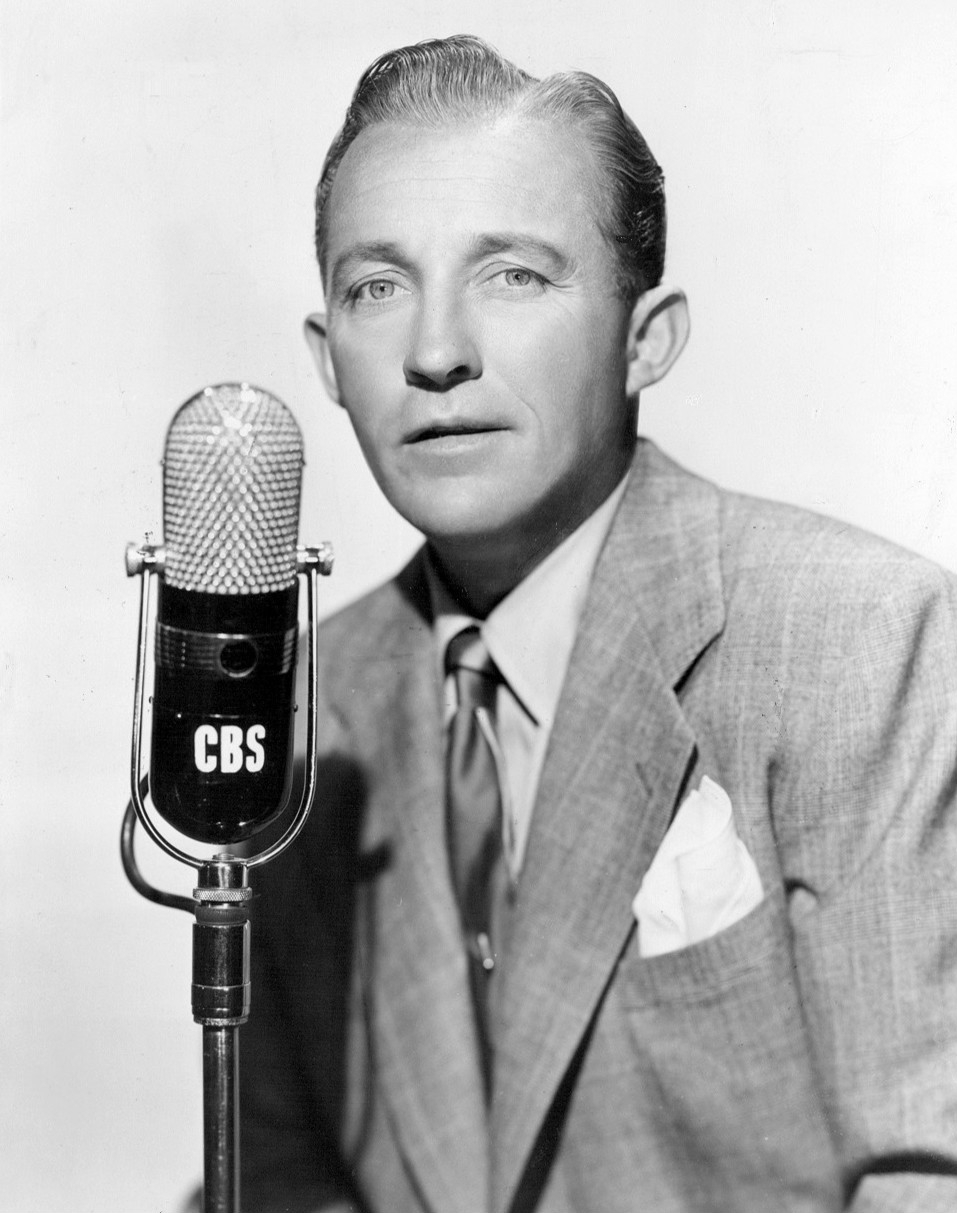
Bing Crosby's (pictured in 1951) Merry Christmas was atop the chart in January, November and December for seven weeks.

The Billboard magazine publishes a weekly chart that ranks the best-selling albums in the United States. The chart nowadays known as the Billboard 200 was titled Best-Selling Popular Record Albums in 1948 and was based on a "weekly survey among 4,970 dealers In all sections of the country. During the year, eleven albums by fifteen artists topped the chart.

Like in the previous years, Merry Christmas by Bing Crosby was the first album to top the chart in the year. It started its run in the issue dated November 15, 1947 and stayed atop for the first week in January. In the issue dated November 15, 1948, the album again ascended to number one for an additional six weeks, for a total of seven weeks at number one in 1948 and a total of 27 weeks since December 1945. (Note: 4 weeks in 1945; 8 weeks in 1946; 8 weeks in 1947; 6 weeks in 1948)

== Chart history ==
Key
†	Indicates best selling album of 1948

Issue date	Album	Artist(s)	Ref.
January 3	Merry Christmas	Bing Crosby	
January 10	Al Jolson Album (Decca 575) (Note: Other names used for Al Jolson Album (Decca 575) include "Al Jolson Souvenir Album" and "Al Jolson – Volume 2".)	Al Jolson	
January 17	Glenn Miller Masterpieces, Volume II	Glenn Miller & His Orchestra	
January 24	Dorothy Shay (the Park Avenue Hillbillie) Goes to Town	Dorothy Shay	
January 31	Glenn Miller Masterpieces, Volume II	Glenn Miller & His Orchestra	
February 7	Glenn Miller Masterpieces, Volume II	Glenn Miller & His Orchestra	
February 14	Glenn Miller Masterpieces, Volume II	Glenn Miller & His Orchestra	
February 21	Glenn Miller Masterpieces, Volume II	Glenn Miller & His Orchestra	
February 28	A Sentimental Date with Perry	Perry Como	
March 6	A Sentimental Date with Perry	Perry Como	
March 13	A Sentimental Date with Perry	Perry Como	
March 20	St. Patrick's Day	Bing Crosby	
March 27	St. Patrick's Day	Bing Crosby	
April 3	Down Memory Lane	Vaughn Monroe	
April 10	Down Memory Lane	Vaughn Monroe	
April 17	Down Memory Lane	Vaughn Monroe	
April 24	Down Memory Lane	Vaughn Monroe	
May 1	Down Memory Lane	Vaughn Monroe	
May 8	Down Memory Lane	Vaughn Monroe	
May 15	Busy Fingers	The Three Suns	
May 22	Songs of Our Times (1932)	Carmen Cavallaro	
May 29	A Presentation of Progressive Jazz †	Stan Kenton	
June 5	A Presentation of Progressive Jazz †	Stan Kenton	
June 12	A Presentation of Progressive Jazz †	Stan Kenton	
June 19	A Presentation of Progressive Jazz †	Stan Kenton	
June 26	A Presentation of Progressive Jazz †	Stan Kenton	
July 3	A Presentation of Progressive Jazz †	Stan Kenton	
July 10	A Presentation of Progressive Jazz †	Stan Kenton	
July 17	A Presentation of Progressive Jazz †	Stan Kenton	
July 24	Al Jolson Volume III Album (Note: Other names used for Al Jolson Volume III Album (Decca 649) include "Al Jolson – Volume Three" and "Al Jolson – Volume 3".)	Al Jolson	
July 31	Al Jolson Volume III Album	Al Jolson	
August 7	Al Jolson Volume III Album	Al Jolson	
August 14	Al Jolson Volume III Album	Al Jolson	
August 21	Al Jolson Volume III Album	Al Jolson	
August 28	Al Jolson Volume III Album	Al Jolson	
September 4	Al Jolson Volume III Album	Al Jolson	
September 11	Al Jolson Volume III Album	Al Jolson	
September 18	Al Jolson Volume III Album	Al Jolson	
September 25	Al Jolson Volume III Album	Al Jolson	
October 2	Al Jolson Volume III Album	Al Jolson	
October 9	Al Jolson Volume III Album	Al Jolson	
October 16	Theme Songs	Tommy Dorsey, Sammy Kaye, Larry Green, Vaughn Monroe, Freddy Martin, Wayne King & The Three Suns	
October 23	Al Jolson Volume III Album	Al Jolson	
October 30	Al Jolson Volume III Album	Al Jolson	
November 6	Theme Songs	Tommy Dorsey, Sammy Kaye, Larry Green, Vaughn Monroe, Freddy Martin, Wayne King & The Three Suns	
November 13	Theme Songs	Tommy Dorsey, Sammy Kaye, Larry Green, Vaughn Monroe, Freddy Martin, Wayne King & The Three Suns	
November 20	Merry Christmas	Bing Crosby	
November 27	Merry Christmas	Bing Crosby	
December 4	Merry Christmas	Bing Crosby	
December 11	Merry Christmas	Bing Crosby	
December 18	Merry Christmas	Bing Crosby	
December 25	Merry Christmas	Bing Crosby	

== See also ==
- 1948 in music
- List of number-one albums (United States)
