= Theme Songs =

Compilation album by various artists
- Released: 1948
- Label: RCA Victor

Theme Songs Played by the Bands Who Made Them Famous (or simply Theme Songs) is a various artists album of phonograph records released in 1948 by RCA Victor.

The back cover reads: "RCA Victor presents the signature songs of eight great popular bands."

== Release ==
The album was originally issued by RCA Victor as a set of four 78-rpm phonograph records (cat. no. P-217).

Later, the album was made available on 45 rpm (cat. no. WP-217) and 33⅓ rpm (cat. no. EPB 3007).

== Critical reception ==
Professional ratings
Review scores
Source	Rating
American Record Guide	(favorable)
Steinway Review of Permanent Music	(favorable)

Steinway Review of Permanent Music gave a favorable review, writing: "Having a party and want big-name bands to entertain your guests? Then be sure to hear the signature tunes of Tommy Dorsey, Tex Beneke, Vaughn Monroe, Freddy Martin, Sammy Kaye, and others in RCA Victor P-217, Theme Songs."

American Record Guide assessed the album as a "sure-fire hit" and continued: "These are pi[e]ces by which the orchestras introduce themselves on the air. They became signature tunes because they were a notch or two higher than their usual fare and more than a shade better as arrangements. Unreservedly recommended."

== Chart performance ==
The album reached No. 1 on Billboard's Best-Selling Popular Record Albums chart.

== Track listing ==
Set of four records (RCA Victor P-217) – listed on Billboard's charts as PT-17

20-2932-A
No.	Title	Writer(s)	Note(s)	Length
1.	"I'm Getting Sentimental over You" (from the Samuel Goldwyn film A Song Is Born)	Ned Washington—George Bassman	(Tommy Dorsey's theme song); Tommy Dorsey and his orchestra

20-2932-B
No.	Title	Writer(s)	Note(s)	Length
1.	"Moonlight Serenade"	Glenn Miller	(Tex Beneke's theme song); Tex Beneke and his orchestra

20-2933-A
No.	Title	Writer(s)	Note(s)	Length
1.	"Tchaikovsky Piano Concerto No. 1"	Arranged by Jack Fina	(Freddy Martin's theme song); Freddy Martin and his orchestra Jack Fina, pianiet

20-2933-B
No.	Title	Writer(s)	Note(s)	Length
1.	"Racing with the Moon"	Watson–Moore–Pope	(Vaughn Monroe's theme song); Vaughn Monroe and his orchestra Vocal refrain by Vaughn Monroe

20-2934-A
No.	Title	Writer(s)	Note(s)	Length
1.	"The Waltz You Saved for Me"	Kahn–King–Flindt	(Wayne King's theme song); Wayne King and his orchestra

20-2934-B
No.	Title	Writer(s)	Note(s)	Length
1.	"Twilight Time"	Ram—M. & A. Nevins—Dunn	(The Three Suns theme song); The Three Suns

20-2935-A
No.	Title	Writer(s)	Note(s)	Length
1.	"Kaye's Melody"	Sammy Kaye	(Sammy Kaye's theme song); Swing and Sway With Sammy Kaye

20-2935-B
No.	Title	Writer(s)	Note(s)	Length
1.	"My Promise to You" (Adapted from Chopin's Nocturne in D)	Ervin Drake—Jimmy Shirl	(Larry Green's theme song); Larry Green and his orchestra

== Charts ==
Chart (1948)	Peak position
US Billboard Best-Selling Popular Record Albums	1

== See also ==
- List of Billboard Best-Selling Popular Record Albums number ones of 1948
