= Linda Hayes =

Linda Hayes may refer to:

- Linda Hayes (singer) (1923–1998), American rhythm and blues singer
- Linda Hayes (actress) (1918–1995), American actress
- Linda Hayes (born 1963), perpetrator of the Cheshire home invasion murders
