= You'll Never Never Know =

Single by the Platters
- B-side: "It Isn't Right"
- Released: 1956
- Recorded: 1956
- Genre: R&B
- Length: 2:32
- Label: Mercury
- Songwriter(s): Jeanette Miles, Paul Robi, Tony Williams

The Platters singles chronology
| "Heaven on Earth" (1956) | "You'll Never Never Know" (1956) | "It Isn't Right" (1956) |

"You'll Never Never Know" is a single by the Platters released in 1956. The song reached number 11 on the Billboard Pop Singles chart. On the Most Played R&B in Jukeboxes chart, the song peaked at number 9. Outside the US, "You'll Never Never Know" went to number 23 on the UK Singles Chart.
