= List of Billboard Best-Selling Popular Record Albums number ones of 1947 =

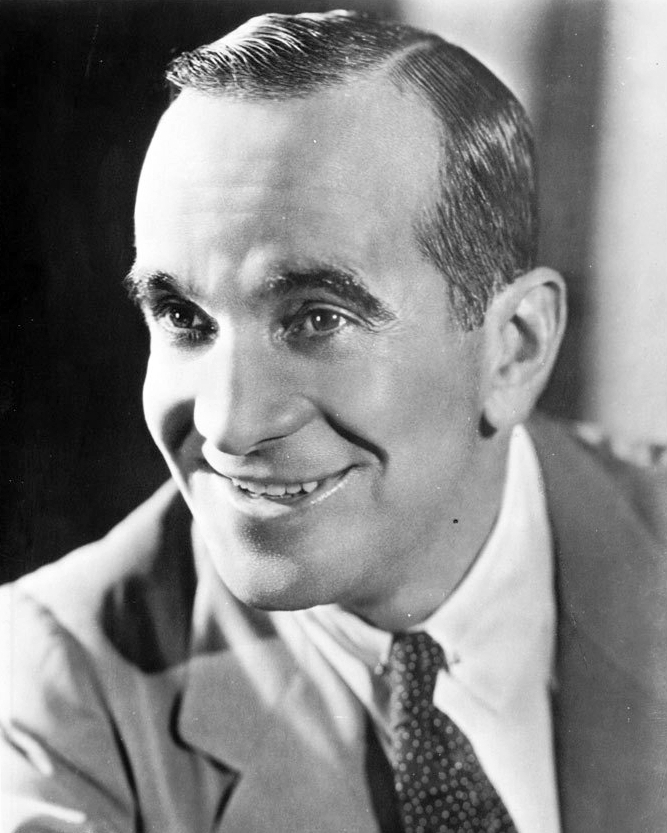
Two albums recorded by Al Jolson (pictured in 1929) topped the chart for a total of 34 weeks. Al Jolson, Vol. 1 spent 25 weeks and Al Jolson Souvenir Album spent nine weeks at number one.

The Billboard magazine publishes a weekly chart that ranks the best-selling albums in the United States. The chart nowadays known as the Billboard 200 was titled Best-Selling Popular Record Albums in 1947 and was based on a "weekly survey among 4,970 dealers In all sections of the country." (Note: The chart was based on a survey among 4,020 dealers until the issue dated February 22, 1947. The following issue (March 1) it was increased to 4,970 dealers.) During the year, seven albums by five artists topped the chart.

Bing Crosby's Merry Christmas was the first album to top the chart in the year. It started its run in November of the previous year and continued to top the chart for the first week in 1947. Like in the previous year, the album returned to number one in November for seven more weeks. The album spent 20 weeks atop the chart between December 1945 and December 1947. It was certified gold 25 years after its release by the Recording Industry Association of America (RIAA) for shipments of 500,000 or more units. The best-selling album of the previous year, Glenn Miller, topped the chart for three more weeks in early 1947, meaning the album topped the charts for 14 weeks over three years. The album finished as the third best-selling of the year and was certified gold by the RIAA in 1968. The follow-up, Glenn Miller Masterpieces, Volume II later topped the chart for one week.

Al Jolson was the only artist to place two albums atop the chart: Al Jolson Album a.k.a. Al Jolson in Songs He Made Famous (Decca 469) (Note: Other names used for Al Jolson Album (Decca 469) include "Al Jolson in Songs He Made Famous", "Al Jolson, Vol. 1", "Al Jolson – Volume 1", and just "Al Jolson".) and Al Jolson Album a.k.a. Al Jolson Souvenir Album (Decca 575). (Note: Other names used for Al Jolson Album (Decca 575) include "Al Jolson Souvenir Album" and "Al Jolson – Volume 2".) The first of them ascended to number one for a single week in the issue dated February 1 and reached the top again on February 15. It was the number-one album in the US for 25 weeks until August 2, making it the longest-charting album on the chart at the time. Furthermore, it was the best-selling album of the year and is estimated to have sold more than one million copies in the US. Jolson's second album debuted atop the chart in mid-August and spent nine weeks at number one, bringing his total weeks spent at number one to 34. In between Jolson's spells at number one Dorothy Shay spent five weeks in the top spot with her debut album Dorothy Shay (the Park Avenue Hillbillie) Sings. Her album finished as the second best-selling of 1947.

== Chart history ==
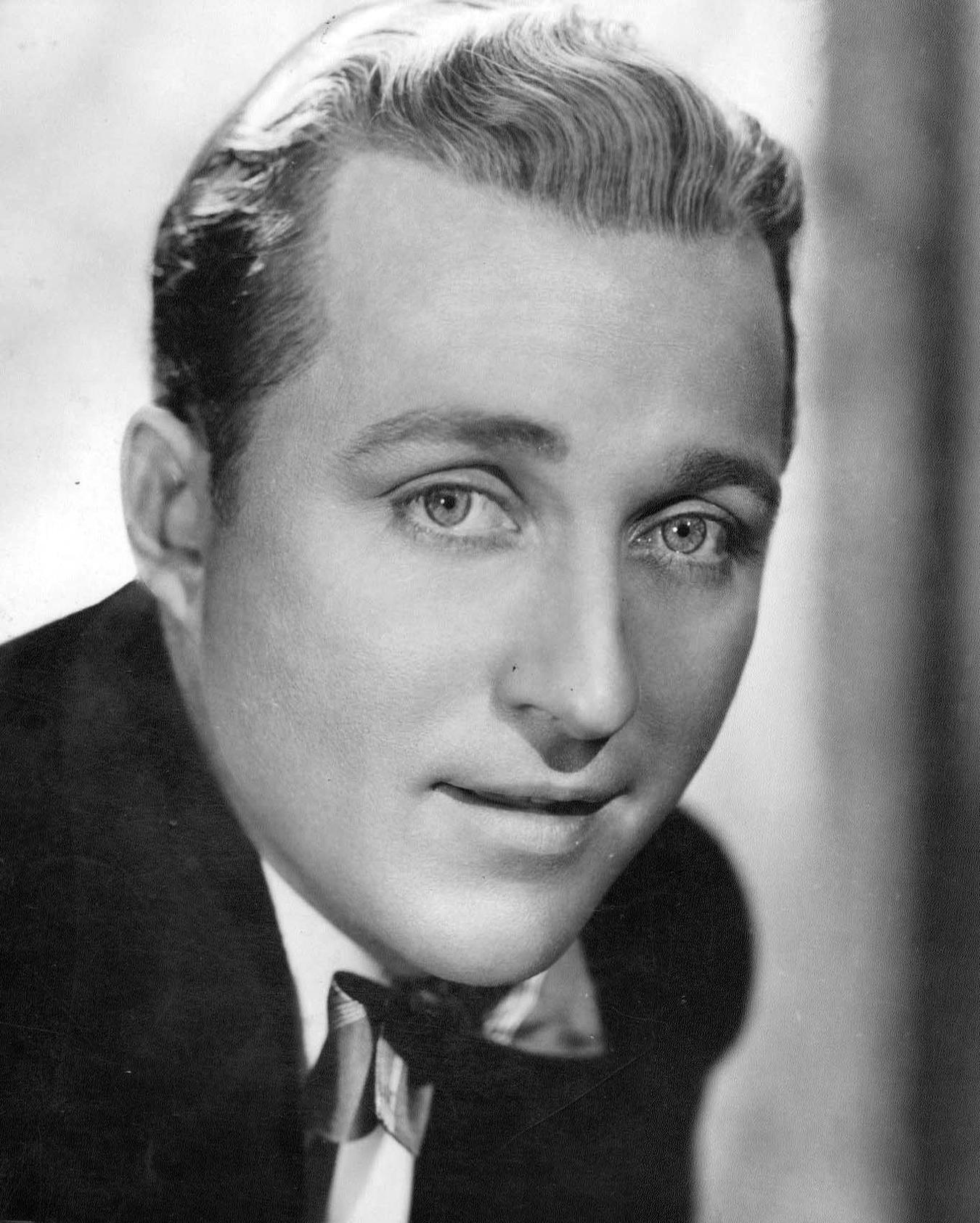
Bing Crosby's (pictured in 1930) Merry Christmas was able to top the chart in December for a third year in a row.

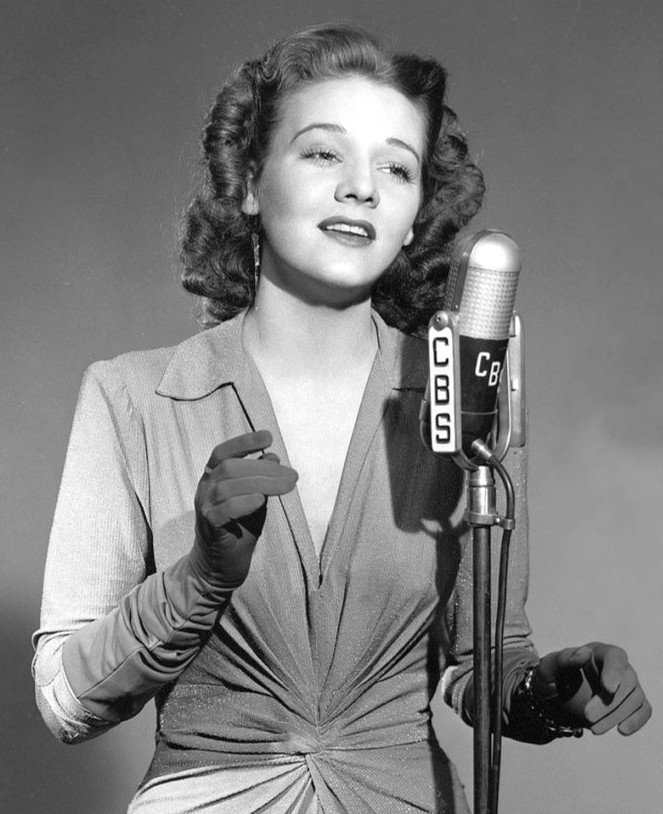
Dorothy Shay (pictured in the 1940s) was the first female singer to top the chart with Dorothy Shay (the Park Avenue Hillbillie) Sings. The album spent five weeks at number one.

Key
†	Indicates best selling album of 1947

Issue date	Album	Artist(s)	Ref.
January 4	Merry Christmas	Bing Crosby	
January 11	All-Time Favorites	Harry James	
January 18	Glenn Miller	Glenn Miller & His Orchestra	
January 25	Glenn Miller	Glenn Miller & His Orchestra	
February 1	Al Jolson Album (Decca 469)†	Al Jolson	
February 8	Glenn Miller	Glenn Miller & His Orchestra	
February 15	Al Jolson Album (Decca 469)†	Al Jolson	
February 22	Al Jolson Album (Decca 469)†	Al Jolson	
March 1	Al Jolson Album (Decca 469)†	Al Jolson	
March 8	Al Jolson Album (Decca 469)†	Al Jolson	
March 15	Al Jolson Album (Decca 469)†	Al Jolson	
March 22	Al Jolson Album (Decca 469)†	Al Jolson	
March 29	Al Jolson Album (Decca 469)†	Al Jolson	
April 5	Al Jolson Album (Decca 469)†	Al Jolson	
April 12	Al Jolson Album (Decca 469)†	Al Jolson	
April 19	Al Jolson Album (Decca 469)†	Al Jolson	
April 26	Al Jolson Album (Decca 469)†	Al Jolson	
May 3	Al Jolson Album (Decca 469)†	Al Jolson	
May 10	Al Jolson Album (Decca 469)†	Al Jolson	
May 17	Al Jolson Album (Decca 469)†	Al Jolson	
May 24	Al Jolson Album (Decca 469)†	Al Jolson	
May 31	Al Jolson Album (Decca 469)†	Al Jolson	
June 7	Al Jolson Album (Decca 469)†	Al Jolson	
June 14	Al Jolson Album (Decca 469)†	Al Jolson	
June 21	Al Jolson Album (Decca 469)†	Al Jolson	
June 28	Al Jolson Album (Decca 469)†	Al Jolson	
July 5	Al Jolson Album (Decca 469)†	Al Jolson	
July 12	Al Jolson Album (Decca 469)†	Al Jolson	
July 19	Al Jolson Album (Decca 469)†	Al Jolson	
July 26	Al Jolson Album (Decca 469)†	Al Jolson	
August 2	Dorothy Shay (the Park Avenue Hillbillie) Sings	Dorothy Shay	
August 9	Dorothy Shay (the Park Avenue Hillbillie) Sings	Dorothy Shay	
August 16	Al Johnson Album (Decca 575)	Al Jolson	
August 23	Al Johnson Album (Decca 575)	Al Jolson	
August 30	Al Johnson Album (Decca 575)	Al Jolson	
September 6	Al Johnson Album (Decca 575)	Al Jolson	
September 13	Al Johnson Album (Decca 575)	Al Jolson	
September 20	Al Johnson Album (Decca 575)	Al Jolson	
September 27	Dorothy Shay (the Park Avenue Hillbillie) Sings	Dorothy Shay	
October 4	Al Jolson Album (Decca 575)	Al Jolson	
October 11	Dorothy Shay (the Park Avenue Hillbillie) Sings	Dorothy Shay	
October 18	Al Jolson Album (Decca 575)	Al Jolson	
October 25	Dorothy Shay (the Park Avenue Hillbillie) Sings	Dorothy Shay	
November 1	Al Jolson Album (Decca 575)	Al Jolson	
November 8	Glenn Miller Masterpieces Vol. II	Glenn Miller & His Orchestra	
November 15	Merry Christmas	Bing Crosby	
November 22	Merry Christmas	Bing Crosby	
November 29	Merry Christmas	Bing Crosby	
December 6	Merry Christmas	Bing Crosby	
December 13	Merry Christmas	Bing Crosby	
December 20	Merry Christmas	Bing Crosby	
December 27	Merry Christmas	Bing Crosby	

== See also ==
- 1947 in music
- List of Billboard 200 number-one albums
