= Sonny Turner =

American singer (1939–2022)

- Born: September 24, 1939
- Origin: Fairmont, West Virginia, U.S.
- Died: January 13, 2022 (aged 82) Los Angeles, California, U.S.
- Instrument: Vocals

Sonny Turner (September 24, 1939 – January 13, 2022) was an American singer. He was best known for replacing Tony Williams as the lead singer of rhythm and blues vocal group The Platters.

== Life and career ==
Prior to his work with The Platters, Turner was the lead singer of a local vocal group called The Metrotones. While performing in a local club in Cleveland as the opening act for Redd Foxx, Turner was approached by local DJ Bill Crane and asked if he would be interested in auditioning for The Platters, as their lead singer Tony Williams was soon to be leaving the group. Turner was chosen out of 100 hopeful auditioners to replace Williams in late 1959. Turner, whose friend and mentor was Jackie Wilson, breathed new life into The Platters with three hit singles: "I Love You 1000 Times" (1966), "With This Ring" (1967), and "Washed Ashore" (1968). He also re-recorded many of The Platters hits of the 1950s, and it is Turner's vocals that are heard on the soundtracks for films such as The Nutty Professor 2 and Hearts in Atlantis.

Turner died from throat cancer in Los Angeles on January 13, 2022, at the age of 82.

== Discography ==
Albums

- Standing Ovation (1974)
- Celebrate The New Year At Harvey's Lake Tahoe (1983)
- Sings At Lake Tahoe (1983)
- Celebrate The New Year '88 At Harvey's, Lake Tahoe (1988)

Singles and EPs

- "Atlanta" / "Interstate 65" (1969)
- "Chicago Woman" / "Now That You're Gone" (1972)
- "I Want A Guarantee" / "Now That You're Gone" (2016), with Maxine Brown
- "That's Why (I Love You So)"
- "The Touch"
- "Special Little Woman"
- "I'll Be Around" (2020)
