= I'm Sorry (The Platters song) =

1957 song by The Platters

"I'm Sorry" is a popular song written by Buck Ram, Peter Tinturin and William W. "Billy" White. In 1957 it was a Top 20 hit for the Platters, peaking at number 19 on the Billboard charts and number 32 on the Canadian CHUM Chart.
