= Tony Williams (singer) =

American singer (1928–1992)

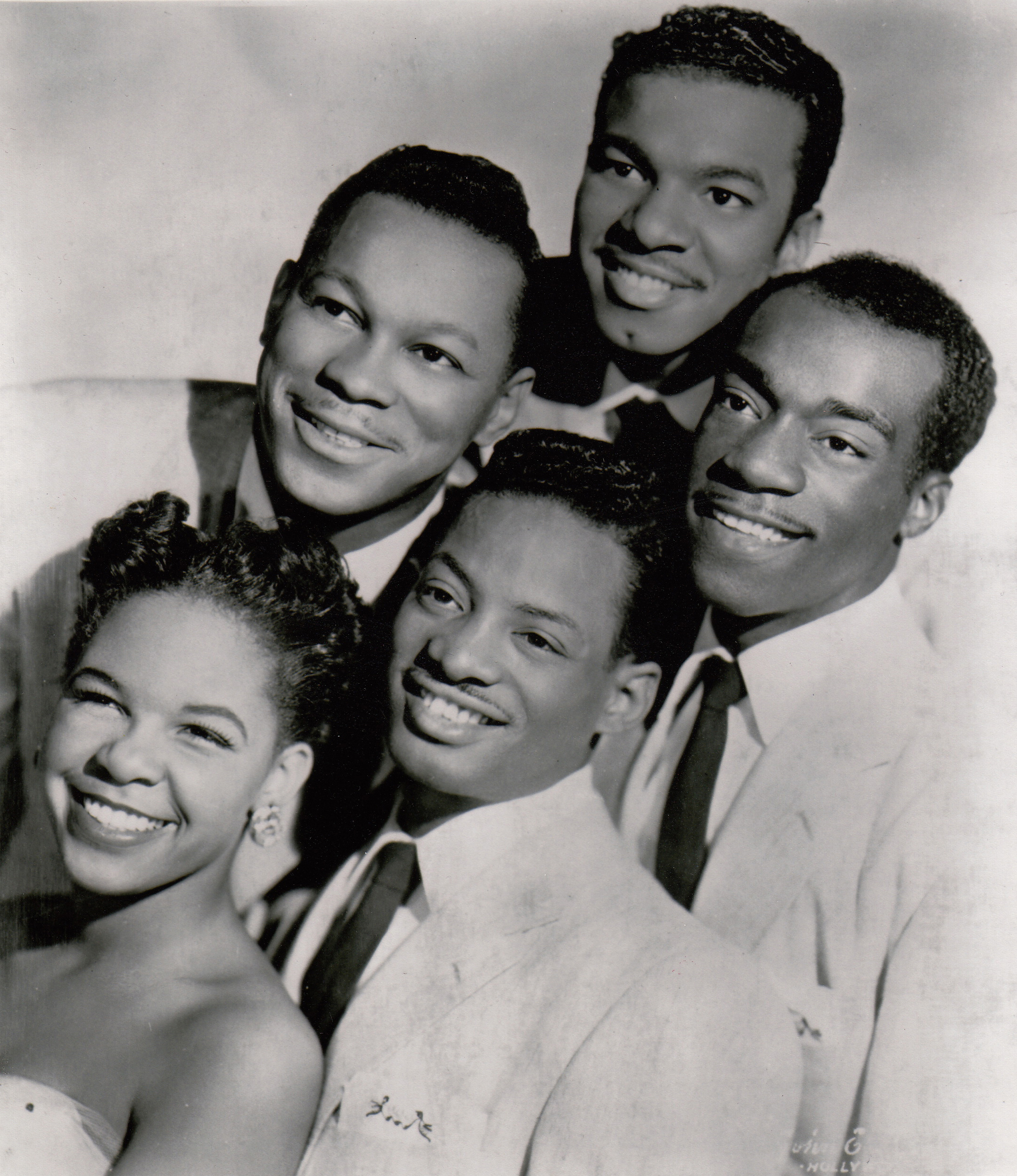
- Williams (second from left) as part of The Platters in 1955

Background information
- Born: Samuel Edward Williams; April 5, 1928; Elizabeth, New Jersey, U.S.
- Died: August 14, 1992 (aged 64) New York City, New York, U.S.
- Genres: R&B; doo-wop
- Occupation: Singer
- Years active: 1953–1992
- Labels: Mercury, Reprise, Philips

Samuel Edward "Tony" Williams (April 5, 1928 – August 14, 1992) was an American R&B singer. From 1953 to 1960, he was the lead vocalist of the Platters.

== Life and career ==
Williams was born in Elizabeth, New Jersey, the son of Bertha and Edward Williams. He served in the United States Army Air Forces around the end of World War II, rising to the rank of sergeant, and after leaving military service moved to Los Angeles, where he joined his older sister Bertha, who was developing a successful singing career under the name Linda Hayes. He worked in menial jobs such as parking lot attendant while competing in evening talent shows.

Williams came to the attention of Ralph Bass of Federal Records, who linked him with an existing vocal group, the Flamingos, comprising Gaynel Hodge, David Lynch, Alex Hodge, and Herb Reed. When they became aware of another group of the same name, they renamed themselves the Platters and made their first recordings in September 1953, with Williams on lead vocal. Their initial recordings were unsuccessful, but Linda Hayes then introduced Williams to songwriter-talent manager Buck Ram, who had written "Twilight Time", "I'll Be Home for Christmas", and "At Your Beck and Call", among other hits. He was impressed by Williams' high tenor singing voice and agreed to manage the group promising to promote Williams as a solo performer when the trends in music changed.

The group continued to record and perform locally, occasionally supporting Linda Hayes, until late 1955 when they were signed by Mercury Records. Their first recording on the label, Buck Ram's song "Only You (And You Alone)", with Williams on lead vocal, became a national hit, and was followed in early 1956 by "The Great Pretender", another Ram song with Williams as lead singer, which became successful on both the R&B and pop charts as well as internationally. Over the next three years, the group had a succession of hits, including "My Prayer", "Twilight Time", and "Smoke Gets in Your Eyes", all featuring Williams. The songs made the Platters one of the most successful doo-wop groups of the 1950s, and a British reviewer described Williams' voice as "unearthly".

In a dispute over money, Williams left the Platters in 1959 to pursue a solo career, and continued to work with Ram as his manager. He recorded an LP, A Girl Is A Girl Is A Girl, but his career faltered after he was arrested with the other men in the group on a morals charge, of which they were later cleared. He continued to perform with the Platters intermittently until 1960 but then won a legal action against Ram which allowed him to formally leave the group. Ram signed him as a solo singer for Reprise Records in 1961, recording Tony Williams Sings His Greatest Hits, including re-recordings of some of the Platters' songs, but returned to Philips Records the following year. He released the album The Magic Touch Of Tony in 1962, and the same year overdubbed vocals for a Platters record, Encore Of Broadway Golden Hits. However, by this time music buyers' tastes had changed, and Williams' voice had lost some of its appeal.

He married Helen Williams in 1963. He later performed with his own, unauthorized version of the Platters, known as the International Platters, which also featured his wife. Musical Director William Gulino worked with Tony Williams and the Platters from 1978 to 1992.

Williams was elected to the Rock and Roll Hall of Fame as a member of the Platters in 1990. He developed diabetes and died in Manhattan of emphysema on August 14, 1992.

== Singles ==
- When You Return (Mercury, 1957)
- Sleepless Nights (Reprise, 1961)
- It's So Easy To Surrender (Reprise, 1961)
- That's More Like It (Reprise, 1962)
- Chloe (Philips, 1962)
- Twenty-Four Lonely Hours (Philips, 1963))
- How Come (Philips, 1963)

== Albums ==
- Magic Touch of Tony (1962), Philips PHM-200-051 (mono) / Philips PHS-600-051 (stereo)
- A Girl Is a Girl Is a Girl (1961 / 1969), Mercury MG 20454 / Mercury SR-60138
- Tony Williams Sings His Greatest Hits (1994), Gold Dust Records Dust 934 (Italy)
- The Voice of the Platters (2014), Vintage Music
