= He's Mine (The Platters song) =

1957 song by the Platters

"He's Mine" is a popular song written by Zola Taylor, Paul Robi and Buck Ram (using the pseudonym Jean Miles). In 1957, it was a top 30 hit for the Platters, peaking at number 23 on the Billboard charts.
