= Herb Reed =

American R&B singer (1928–2012)

Herbert Reed
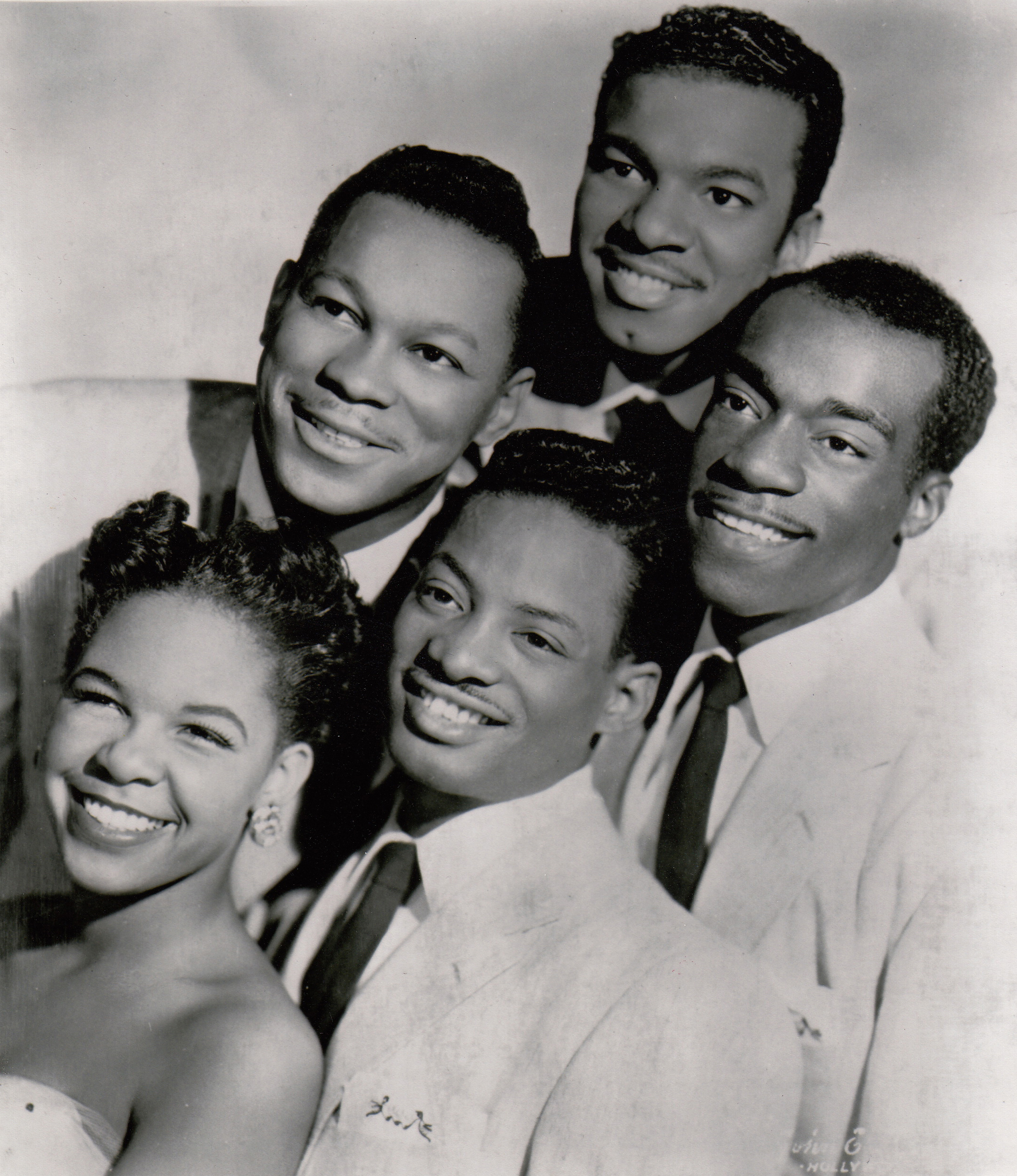
- Herbert Reed (first from right) as part of The Platters in 1955
- Born: August 7, 1928; Kansas City, Missouri, U.S.
- Died: July 4, 2012 (aged 83); Boston, MA, U.S.
- Resting place: Peabody, MA, U.S.
- Occupation: bass singer

Herbert Reed (August 7, 1928 – June 4, 2012) was an American musician, vocalist, and founding/naming member of The Platters, known for songs such as "Only You (and You Alone)" and "The Great Pretender". Reed was the last surviving original member of the group, which he co-founded with Joe Jefferson, Alex Hodge, and Cornell Gunter (who later founded The Coasters). Reed is credited with creating The Platters' name. Reed thought of the group's name after noticing that DJs in the 1950s called their records "platters". Reed was inducted into the Rock and Roll Hall of Fame in 1990 as a member of the Platters.

Reed was raised in poverty in Kansas City, Missouri and moved to Los Angeles when he was fifteen years old. He moved to the Boston area during the 1970s after the success of The Platters. He was the only member of The Platters who sang on all of the approximately 400 songs recorded by the group. His background bass vocals can be heard on The Platters' biggest hits, including "Smoke Gets in Your Eyes", "The Great Pretender", "Twilight Time", and "My Prayer". He is the lead vocalist on "Sixteen Tons", "Singin' in the Rain", "In a Little Spanish Town", "Sleepy Time Gal", "Darktown Strutters' Ball", "Blues in the Night", and "On the Top of My Mind".

Over the years, numerous groups sprang up using the Platters name. In 2016, Reed won a court case granting him exclusive rights to the Platters name. In 2012, Reed said in an interview, "It's not right to have someone steal your name. It's just not right. We were cheated back then, but that's how things were done...It's theft, and I have to fight it so that no other artist faces this."

Reed toured throughout his career. He performed as many as 200 concerts per year until 2012, when he stopped due to declining health. He died from complications from several ailments, including heart disease and chronic obstructive pulmonary disease, at a hospice in Boston on June 4, 2012, aged 83. He had most recently resided in Arlington, Massachusetts.
