= He's Mine =

He's Mine may refer to:

- "He's Mine" (MoKenStef song), 1995
- "He's Mine" (Billy Ray Cyrus song), 2011 also recorded by Rodney Atkins
- "He's Mine" (The Platters song), 1957
