= Enchanted (The Platters song) =

Single by The Platters
- B-side: "The Sound and the Fury"
- Released: March 1959
- Genre: R&B
- Length: 2:50
- Label: Mercury
- Songwriter: Buck Ram
- Producer: Jerry Wald Productions

The Platters singles chronology
"Smoke Gets in Your Eyes" (1958)	"Enchanted" (1959)	"Remember When" (1959)

"Enchanted" is a song written by Buck Ram and performed by The Platters. It reached No. 9 on the U.S. R&B chart and No. 12 on the U.S. pop chart in 1959. In Canada it reached No. 10.

The song was produced by Jerry Wald Productions.

The song ranked No. 64 on Billboard magazine's Top 100 singles of 1959.

== In other media ==
"Enchanted" has been well known for appearing in the Breaking Bad franchise where it first played when Jesse Pinkman shoots heroin with Jane Margolis for the first time in "Mandala". A cover version performed by American sister duo Chloe x Halle was featured in the recap montage of Jesse's arc leading up to El Camino: A Breaking Bad Movie.
