= Al Jolson in Songs He Made Famous =

Studio album by Al Jolson
- Released: 1946
- Label: Decca

Al Jolson chronology
Al Jolson in Songs He Made Famous (1946)	Al Jolson Souvenir Album (1947)

Al Jolson in Songs He Made Famous (also known as simply Al Jolson Album and later as Al Jolson, Vol. 1) is a studio album recorded by Al Jolson for Decca. It was released in 1946 as a set of four 78-rpm phonograph records (catalog no. 469).

Seven of the eight included songs were featured in the biographical musical film The Jolson Story released in the same year.

== Release ==
The album was originally released as a set of four 10-inch 78-rpm phonograph records (cat. no. A-469).

== Content and reception ==
On this album, Jolson sings eight of his best-known songs. On the first two sides, that were recorded earlier, he is accompanied by an orchestra directed by Carmen Dragon and on all the other sides by an orchestra directed by Morris Stoloff.

Seven of the eight songs (all except "Sonny Boy") were featured in the film The Jolson Story released on screen in the same year 1946.

Professional ratings
Review scores
Source	Rating
Billboard	positive

Billboard reviewed the album in its issue from December 21, 1946, writing: "It's a Jolsoniana nicety, rich in nostalgic needling appeal from start to finish, and proves Jolson is a song seller without peer of his school. [...] [N]ow with the movie coming up, it's a set of spinnings rich in merchandising appeal."

The album reached number one on Billboard's Best-Selling Popular Record Albums chart.

== 33-rpm and 45-rpm re-releases ==
Later, the album was made available on 33 rpm (one 10-inch LP, cat. no. DL 5026) and 45 rpm (a set of four 7-inch records, cat. no. 9-9).

== Track listing ==
Set of four 10-inch 78-rpm records (Decca A-469)

Side 1
No.	Title	Writer(s)	Note(s)	Length
1.	"April Showers"	Louis Silvers—B. G. DeSylva	featured in Columbia Picture The Jolson Story

Side 2
No.	Title	Writer(s)	Note(s)	Length
1.	"Swanee"	George Gershwin—Irving Caesar	featured in Columbia Picture The Jolson Story

Side 3
No.	Title	Writer(s)	Note(s)	Length
1.	"California, Here I Come"	Joseph Meyer—Al Jolson—B. G. DeSylva	featured in Columbia Picture The Jolson Story

Side 4
No.	Title	Writer(s)	Note(s)	Length
1.	"Rock-a-Bye Your Baby with a Dixie Melody"	Jean Schwartz—Sam Lewis—Joe Young	featured in Columbia Picture The Jolson Story

Side 5
No.	Title	Writer(s)	Note(s)	Length
1.	"You Made Me Love You (I Didn't Want to Do It)"	James V. Monaco—Joe McCarthy	featured in Columbia Picture The Jolson Story

Side 6
No.	Title	Writer(s)	Note(s)	Length
1.	"Ma Blushin' Rosie (Ma Posie Sweet)"	John Stromberg—Edgar Smith	featured in Columbia Picture The Jolson Story

Side 7
No.	Title	Writer(s)	Length
1.	"Sonny Boy"	Al Jolson—B. G. DeSylva—Lew Brown—Ray Henderson

Side 8
No.	Title	Writer(s)	Note(s)	Length
1.	"My Mammy"	Walter Donaldson—Sam Lewis—Joe Young	featured in Columbia Picture The Jolson Story

10-inch LP (Decca DL 5026)

Side 1
No.	Title	Length
1.	"April Showers"
2.	"Swanee"
3.	"California, Here I Come"
4.	"Rock-a-Bye Your Baby with a Dixie Melody"

Side 2
No.	Title	Length
1.	"You Made Me Love You (I Didn't Want to Do It)"
2.	"Ma Blushin' Rosie (Ma Posie Sweet)"
3.	"Sonny Boy"
4.	"My Mammy"

== Charts ==
Chart (1947)	Peak position
US Billboard Best-Selling Popular Record Albums	1

== See also ==
- List of Billboard Best-Selling Popular Record Albums number ones of 1947
