= All-Time Favorites =

Compilation album by Harry James and his orchestra
- Released: 1946
- Label: Columbia

All-Time Favorites by Harry James, or simply All-Time Favorites, is a compilation by American trumpeter and bandleader Harry James released as an album of phonograph records in 1946 by Columbia.

== Release ==
The album was originally released as a set of four 10-inch 78-rpm phonograph records (cat. no. C-117).

== Content and reception ==
Professional ratings
Review scores
Source	Rating
Billboard	(positive)

Professional ratings
1955 LP version
Review scores
Source	Rating
AllMusic	2/5 stars

All the tracks except "Ciribiribin" (marked as James' "theme song") were instrumentals.

Billboard reviewed the album in the December 21, 1946, issue, writing: "Eight of the major Harry James hits on wax are brought back for this package. [...] In each instance, they show off the James trumpet, both hot and sweet, to excellent advantage. [...] Holiday season should make this a popular gift piece. Moreover, most of the sides should be good for another flow of nickels in the coin boxes."

The album spent one week at number one on Billboard's Best-Selling Popular Record Albums chart in January 1947.

== Track listing ==
Set of four 10-inch 78-rpm records (Columbia Set C-117)

All the tracks are marked as "fox trot".

C117-1
No.	Title	Writer(s)	Note(s)	Length
1.	"Ciribiribin (They're So in Love)"	Lawrence; James	Theme song Based on an original melody by A. Pestalozza; Vocal chorus by Frank Sinatra; Harry James and his orchestra

C117-2
No.	Title	Writer(s)	Note(s)	Length
1.	"Sleepy Lagoon"	Lawrence; Coates	Harry James and his orchestra

C117-3
No.	Title	Writer(s)	Note(s)	Length
1.	"One O'Clock Jump"	Basie	Harry James and his orchestra

C117-4
No.	Title	Writer(s)	Note(s)	Length
1.	"Two O'Clock Jump"	James; Basie; Goodman	Harry James and his orchestra

C117-5
No.	Title	Writer(s)	Note(s)	Length
1.	"You Made Me Love You (I Didn't Want to Do It)"	J. McCarthy; Monaco	Harry James and his orchestra

C117-6
No.	Title	Writer(s)	Note(s)	Length
1.	"Music Makers"	James	Harry James and his orchestra

C117-7
No.	Title	Writer(s)	Note(s)	Length
1.	"The Flight of the Bumble Bee"	Rimsky-Korsakov; arr. James	Instrumental; Harry James and his orchestra

C117-8
No.	Title	Writer(s)	Note(s)	Length
1.	"Concerto for Trumpet"	James	Harry James and his orchestra

== Charts ==
Chart (1947)	Peak position
US Billboard Best-Selling Popular Record Albums	1

Year-end charts

Chart (1947)	Peak position
US Billboard – The Year's Top Selling Popular Albums over Retail Counters	14

== See also ==
- List of Billboard Best-Selling Popular Record Albums number ones of 1947
