= Dorothy Shay (the Park Avenue Hillbillie) Goes to Town =

Studio album by Dorothy Shay
- Released: 1947
- Label: Columbia

Dorothy Shay chronology
Dorothy Shay (the Park Avenue Hillbillie) Sings (1946)	Dorothy Shay (the Park Avenue Hillbillie) Goes to Town (1947)

Dorothy Shay (the Park Avenue Hillbillie) Goes to Town is the second studio album by Dorothy Shay (a.k.a. the Park Avenue Hillbillie). It was released by Columbia Records in 1947.

== Background ==
The album was originally released as a set of four 10-inch 78-rpm phonograph records (cat. no. C-155).

== Reception ==
Professional ratings
Review scores
Source	Rating
American Record Guide	positive
Billboard	positive
Consumers' Research Bulletin	positive
The Hollywood Reporter	positive

The magazine American Record Guide praised the set, writing: "For her second album, Dorothy Shay brings her hillbilly subjects to town. Her sly, double-entente songs are delightful. Grand fun!

Silver Screen noted: "Less on the hillbilly side [than the first one], this album gives out with more of the sophisticated persuasion in which Dorothy is so adept."

On the other hand, Consumers' Research Bulletin said that the second album was "less intriguing" than the first, Dorothy Shay (the Park Avenue Hillbillie) Sings.

The Hollywood Reporter's review read: "The new Dorothy Shay Goes to Town album may not reach the peak her first one did, but it's still great entertainment. Her sophisticated interpretation of special hillbilly material is a new twist and very refreshing."

The album spent one week at number one on Billboard's Best-Selling Popular Record Albums chart.

== Track listing ==
Set of four 10-inch 78-rpm records (Columbia set C-155)

Side 1
No.	Title	Writer(s)	Length
1.	"Just a Friendly Feeling"	Farrar; Gannaway

Side 2
No.	Title	Writer(s)	Length
1.	"Mountain Lullaby"	McCreery

Side 3
No.	Title	Writer(s)	Length
1.	"He's the One"	Shay; H. Smith

Side 4
No.	Title	Writer(s)	Length
1.	"The Style to Which I'm Accustomed"	McCreery

Side 5
No.	Title	Writer(s)	Length
1.	"With a Little Indiscretion on the Side"	Farrar; Gannaway

Side 6
No.	Title	Writer(s)	Length
1.	"It's the Little Things that Count"	Merrill; Shay

Side 7
No.	Title	Writer(s)	Length
1.	"Agnes Clung"	Shay; H. Smith

Side 8
No.	Title	Writer(s)	Length
1.	"The Drainpipe Song" (Your Baby Has Gone Down the Drainpipe)	Amsterdam; Patrick

== Personnel ==
- Dorothy Shay, vocals
- Orchestra under the direction of Mischa Russell

== Charts ==
Chart (1948)	Peak position
US Billboard Best-Selling Popular Record Albums	1

Year-end charts

Chart (1947)	Peak position
US Billboard – The Year's Top Selling Popular Albums over Retail Counters	12

== See also ==
- List of Billboard Best-Selling Popular Record Albums number ones of 1948
