= Busy Fingers =

Studio album by the Three Suns
- Released: 1948
- Label: RCA Victor

Busy Fingers is an album of phonograph records by the Three Suns released in 1948 by RCA Victor.

== Release ==
The album was originally issued by RCA Victor as a set of four 78-rpm phonograph records (cat. no. P-206).

In 1952, the album was re-issued on 33 rpm (a 10-inch LP record, cat. co. LPM 3040) and 45 rpm (two 7-inch records, cat. no. EPB 3040).

== Content ==
RCA Victor Record Review wrote of the album: "Organ, guitar and accordion, manipulated by The Three Suns in anything ranging from haunting ballad interpretations to bouncy novelties, concentrate on the latter for this new album. A gay and appealing potpourri includes such perky hits as 'Dancing Tambourine', 'Nola', 'The Doll Dance' and many a favorite."

== Reception ==
Professional ratings
Review scores
| Source | Rating |
|---|---|
| Saturday Review of Literature | (no rating) |

The album reached No. 1 on Billboard's Best-Selling Popular Record Albums chart.

== Track listing ==
Set of four records (RCA Victor P-206)

20-2815-A
| No. | Title | Writer(s) | Length |
|---|---|---|---|
| 1. | "Dancing Tambourine" | Phil Ponce—W. C. Polla |

20-2815-B
| No. | Title | Writer(s) | Length |
|---|---|---|---|
| 1. | "Stumbling" | Zez Confrey |

20-2816-A
| No. | Title | Writer(s) | Length |
|---|---|---|---|
| 1. | "Dizzy Fingers" | Zez Confrey |

20-2816-B
| No. | Title | Writer(s) | Length |
|---|---|---|---|
| 1. | "Eccentric" | J. Russel Robinson |

20-2817-A
| No. | Title | Writer(s) | Length |
|---|---|---|---|
| 1. | "The Doll Dance" (from Hollywood Music Box Review) | Nacio Herb Brown |

20-2817-B
| No. | Title | Writer(s) | Length |
|---|---|---|---|
| 1. | "Nola" | Felix Arndt |

20-2818-A
| No. | Title | Writer(s) | Length |
|---|---|---|---|
| 1. | "Canadian Capers" | Burtnett–Chandler–White–Cohen |

20-2818-B
| No. | Title | Writer(s) | Length |
|---|---|---|---|
| 1. | "The Wedding of the Painted Doll" | Nacio Herb Brown—Arthur Freed |

== Charts ==
| Chart (1948) | Peak position |
|---|---|
| US Billboard Best-Selling Popular Record Albums | 1 |

== See also ==
- List of Billboard Best-Selling Popular Record Albums number ones of 1948
