= My Prayer =

Single by the Platters

from the album The Platters (Mercury Records)
- B-side: "Heaven on Earth"
- Released: July 1956
- Genre: Traditional Pop, Doo-Wop
- Length: 2:48
- Label: Mercury
- Songwriters: Georges Boulanger; Carlos Gomez Barrera; Jimmy Kennedy
- Producer: Buck Ram

The Platters singles chronology
"(You've Got) The Magic Touch" (1956)	"My Prayer" (1956)	"Heaven on Earth" (1956)

"My Prayer" is a 1939 popular song with music by salon violinist Georges Boulanger and lyrics by Carlos Gomez Barrera and Jimmy Kennedy. It was originally written by Boulanger with the title Avant de mourir (Before dying) in 1926. Kennedy added the lyrics for this version in 1939.

Glenn Miller recorded the song that year for a number two hit and the Ink Spots' version featuring Bill Kenny reached number three, as well, that year. It has been recorded many times since, but the biggest hit version was a doo-wop rendition in 1956 by the Platters, whose single release reached number one on the Billboard Top 100 in the summer, and ranked four for the year. This version also went to #1 on both the R&B Airplay and R&B Juke Box chart.

The Platters recording features in the 2008 film The Curious Case of Benjamin Button, in the 1985 film Mischief, in the 1999 film October Sky, and in two episodes of the 2017 series of Twin Peaks. The Ink Spots' version of the song was featured in the 1992 movie Malcolm X. Vera Lynn sang the song in the British film One Exciting Night in 1944.

The song also became a tango in the Italian version by Norma Bruni and Cinico Angelini's orchestra (1940), "Sì, voglio vivere ancor!".

First italian version of "My prayer", titled "Sì, voglio vivere ancor!" by Norma Bruni.

== Recordings ==
- Ambrose (1939)
- Denny Dennis recorded June 17, 1939
- Glenn Miller and His Orchestra (1939)
- The Orioles (1951)
- Rosita Serrano, German lyrics by Curth Flatow entitled "Eine Saite zersprang". Rosita Serrano with Kurt Wege's orchestra Violin solo: Barnabas Bakos recorded it in Berlin on November 22, 1951. The song was released by Electrola as catalog number EG 7702. Serrano also performed it in the West German film Dark Eyes (Schwarze Augen)
- Patti Page (1955) included in the compilation album Golden Memories (1982)
- Jimmie Rodgers for his album The Number One Ballads (1959)
- Digger Revell (1965) reached No. 25 on the Australian singles chart.

== See also ==
- "Our Prayer", a song by the Beach Boys
