= The Platters =

American music group

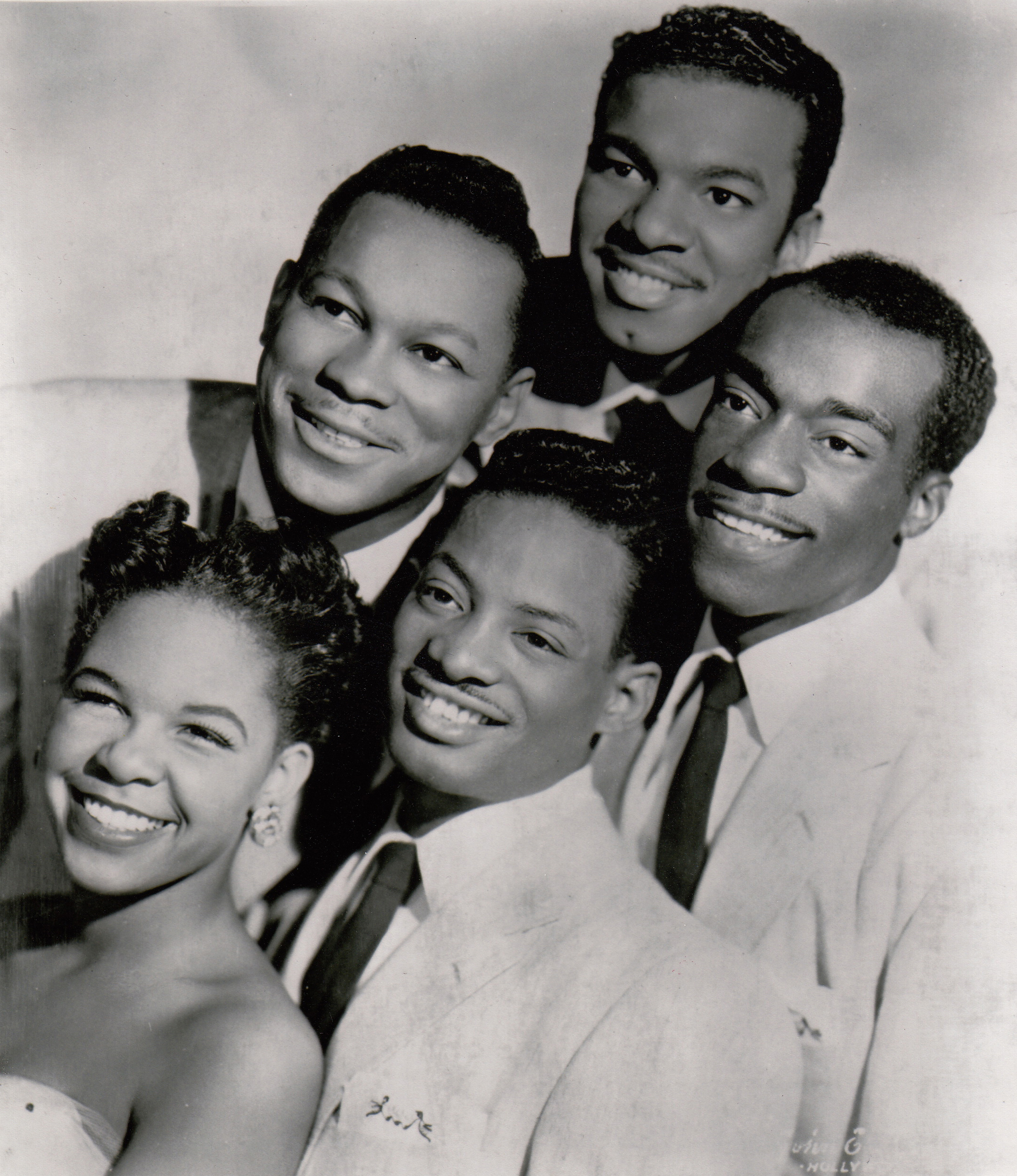
- The Platters in 1955; from left to right: Taylor, Williams, Lynch, Robi, Reed

Background information
- Origin: Los Angeles, California, U.S.
- Genres: Rhythm and blues; doo-wop; traditional pop; rock and roll
- Years active: 1952–present
- Labels: Federal Records; Mercury Records; Musicor Records
- Members: Lance Bernard Bryant; Omar Ross; Jovian K. Ford; Brittany Michelle Wallace
- Past members: Tony Williams; David Lynch; Paul Robi; Herb Reed; Zola Taylor; Barbara Randolph; Sandra Dawn; Candace Culcleasure; Alex Hodge; Cornell Gunter; Joe Jefferson; Sonny Turner
- Website: theplatters.com

The Platters are an American rhythm and blues vocal group formed in 1952. They are one of the most successful vocal bands of the early rock and roll era. Their distinctive sound bridges the pre-rock Tin Pan Alley tradition and the new burgeoning genre. The act has gone through multiple line-ups over the years, earning it the branding tag "Many Voices One Name", with the most successful incarnation comprising lead tenor Tony Williams, David Lynch, Paul Robi, naming member Herb Reed, and Zola Taylor. The Platters had 40 charting singles on the Billboard Hot 100 between 1955 and 1967, including four number-one hits. In 1990, the band was inducted into the Rock and Roll Hall of Fame. The group continues to perform around the world with "Herb Reed Enterprises" (an LLC set up by Reed in response to numerous fake Platters groups) owning the rights and trademark to the name.

== Band formation and early years ==
The Platters formed in Los Angeles in 1952 and were initially managed by Federal Records A&R man Ralph Bass. The original group consisted of teenagers Alex Hodge, his brother Gaynel, Curtis Williams, Joe Jefferson, and Cornell Gunter. Ralph Bass replaced Gunter with Tony Williams, and Herb Reed joined the group in 1953 after his discharge from the U.S. Army in December 1952, as a replacement for Jefferson. Reed named the group while sitting around the kitchen table at the Hodges' home with the others in the group. He was inspired by Mrs. Hodge placing a plate of cookies on the kitchen table where the group was sitting trying to find a new name. Several 78 rpm records were lying on the table, and as she pushed them aside she said, "They look just like platters." Reed said, "That's it. We'll call ourselves The Platters."

In June 1953, Gunter left to join The Flairs and was replaced by lead vocalist Tony Williams. Next, the band then released two singles with Federal Records, under the management of Bass, but found little success. Bass then asked his friend, music entrepreneur, and songwriter Buck Ram, to coach the group in the hope of getting a hit record. Ram made some changes to the lineup, most notably the addition of female vocalist Zola Taylor and in autumn 1954, the replacement of Alex Hodge by Paul Robi.

Under Ram's guidance, The Platters recorded eight R&B/gospel songs for Federal in R&B/gospel style, scoring a few minor regional hits on the West Coast, and backed Williams' sister, Linda Hayes. One song recorded during their tenure at Federal, "Only You (And You Alone)", originally written by Ram for the Ink Spots, was deemed unreleasable by the label, though copies of the early version do exist.

Despite their lack of chart success, The Platters were a profitable touring group, successful enough that the Penguins, right after their No. 8 single "Earth Angel", asked Ram to manage them as well. With the Penguins in hand, Ram was able to parlay Mercury Records' interest into a 2-for-1 deal. To sign the Penguins, Ram insisted, Mercury also had to take The Platters. The Penguins would never have a hit for the label.

== Charting hits ==
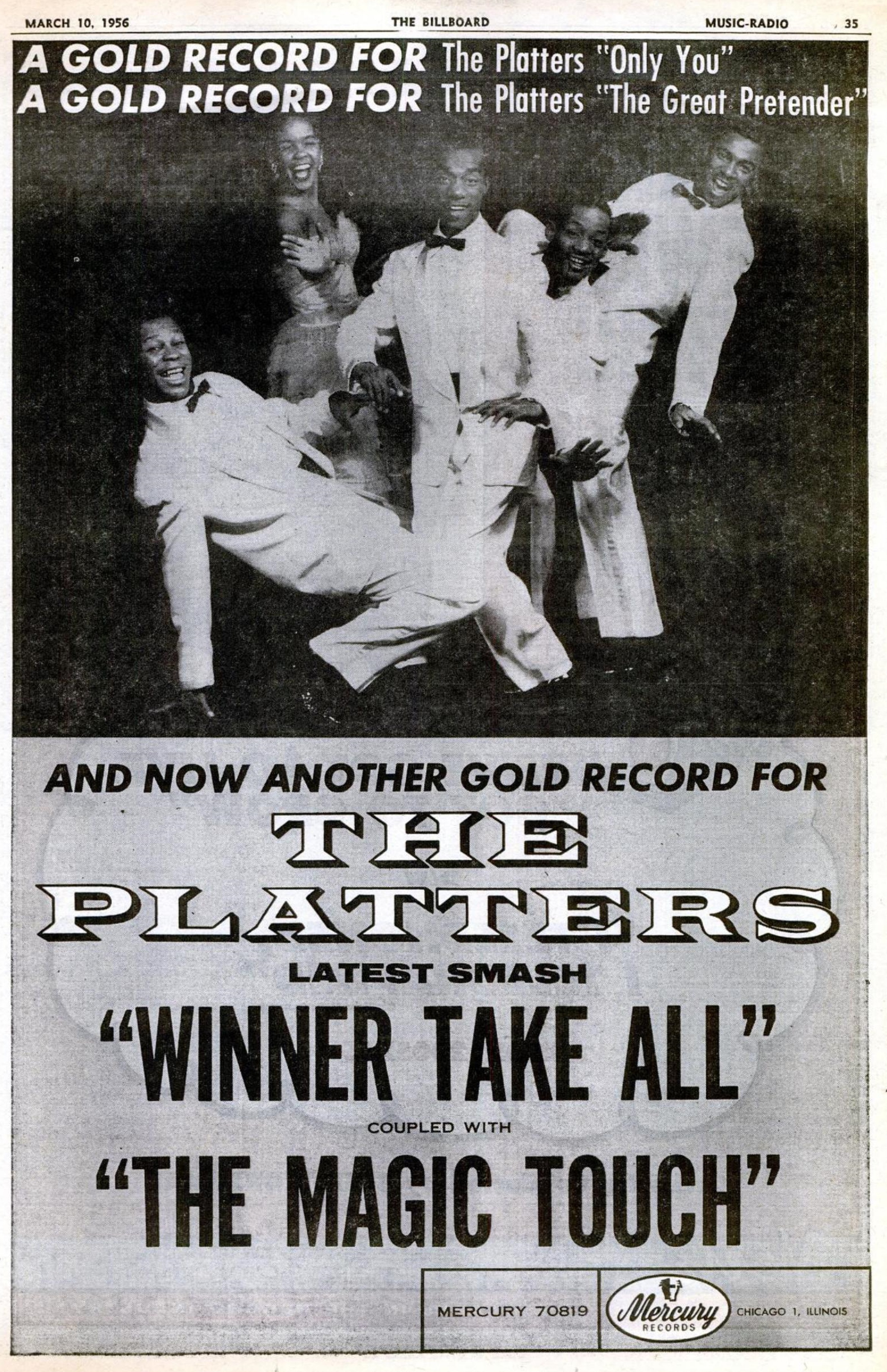
Advertisement featured in Billboard, March 10, 1956

Convinced by Jean Bennett and Tony Williams that "Only You" had potential, Ram had The Platters re-record the song during their first session for Mercury. Released in the summer of 1955, it became the group's first Top Ten hit on the pop charts and topped the R&B charts for seven weeks. The follow-up, "The Great Pretender", with lyrics written in the washroom of the Flamingo Hotel in Las Vegas by Buck Ram, exceeded the success of their debut and became The Platters' first national No. 1 hit. "The Great Pretender" was also the act's biggest R&B hit, with an 11-week run atop that chart. In 1956, The Platters appeared in the first major motion picture based around rock and roll, Rock Around the Clock, and performed both "Only You" and "The Great Pretender".

The Platters' unique vocal style had touched a chord in the music-buying public. A string of hit singles followed, including three more national No. 1 hits and more modest chart successes such as "I'm Sorry" (No. 11) and "He's Mine" (No. 23) in 1957, "Enchanted" (No. 12) in 1959, and "(You've Got) The Magic Touch" (No. 4) in 1956. The Platters soon hit upon the successful formula of updating older standards, such as "My Prayer", "Twilight Time", "Harbor Lights", "To Each His Own", "If I Didn't Care", and Jerome Kern's "Smoke Gets in Your Eyes". This latter release caused a small controversy after Kern's widow expressed concern that her late husband's composition would be turned into a "rock and roll" record. It topped both the American and British charts in the Platters-style arrangement.

The Platters differed from most other groups of the era because Ram had the group incorporated in 1956 as Five Platters, Inc (FPI). Each member of the group received a 20% share in the stock, full royalties, and their Social Security was paid. As group members left one by one, Ram and his business partner, Jean Bennett, bought their stock, which they claimed gave them ownership of the "Platters" name. A court later ruled, however, that "FPI was a sham used by Mr. Ram to obtain ownership in the name the 'Platters', and FPI's issuance of stock to the group members was "illegal and void because it violated California corporate securities law."

The group was inducted into the Rock and Roll Hall of Fame in 1990 and into the Vocal Group Hall of Fame in its inaugural year of 1998. The Platters were the first rock and roll era group to have a Top Ten album in the United States. They were also the only act to have three songs included on the American Graffiti soundtrack that fueled an oldies revival already underway in the early to mid-1970s: "Smoke Gets in Your Eyes", "The Great Pretender", and "Only You (and You Alone)". The group had four top 100 compilation albums in the Australian top 100 between 1975 and 1986.

== Changing line-up ==
The line-up in 1952 included lead vocalist Cornell Gunter, Herb Reed, Alex Hodge, Joe Jefferson, and David Lynch. Soon, Gunter was replaced by tenor Tony Williams. The band's second manager Ram decided to build the group around Williams's distinctive and versatile voice and his ability to bring life to Ram's songs. Within a year, Alex Hodge and Jefferson were also out and replaced by Paul Robi, and a woman, Zola Taylor. The details of baritone Hodge's departure are muddy; author Peter A. Grendysa says Ram fired Alex Hodge in October 1954 after having been accused of possession of marijuana. Bookers and the record company were told that Hodge was let go for bouncing a 15-dollar check. The resulting line-up, the one remembered for some of the group's timeless hits, lasted until 1960.

As a group, The Platters began to have difficulties with the public after 1959, when the four male members were arrested in Cincinnati on drug and prostitution charges. Although no one was convicted, their professional reputation was seriously damaged and US radio stations started removing their records from playlists, forcing the group to rely more heavily on European bookings.

In 1960, lead vocalist Williams left to pursue a solo career and was replaced by tenor Sonny Turner. Mercury refused to issue further Platters releases without Williams on lead vocals, provoking a lawsuit between the label and manager Ram. As a result, the label spent two years releasing old Williams-era material until the group's contract lapsed. The group's line-up further splintered: in 1964 Taylor left and was consecutively replaced by Beverly Hansen Harris, Barbara Randolph and, in 1965, by Sandra Dawn. 1965 also saw the departure of Robi, who was replaced by Nate Nelson, former lead voice of the Flamingos. From 1967 to 1971, baritone Bob White toured with the group.

This splintering of the group's line-up led to wrangling over The Platters' name, with injunctions, non-compete clauses, and multiple versions of the act touring at the same time. Williams, Robi, and Taylor led their own Platters' groups and for a short while, Taylor, Robi, and Lynch joined forces as "The Original Platters" with Williams-clone Johnny Barnes as their lead singer. Distinguishing his group from the offshoots started by former members, Ram added his name to that of the group. The "Buck Ram Platters", built to showcase his songs, were signed to Musicor Records and enjoyed a short chart renaissance in 1966–67, with the comeback singles "I Love You 1000 Times", "With This Ring", and the Motown-influenced "Washed Ashore". Sonny Turner sang the lead on these three records, with Reed, Lynch, Nelson, and Dawn completing the group. Nelson left the group in 1967. Dawn, who left in 1969, was replaced by Regina Koco, who stayed with the group until 1983.

Also, in 1969, Reed, the final member of the original Platters, resigned from the group to start his own group, Herb Reed and Sweet River. After his group's demise, Reed performed under the name Herb Reed and The Platters. Nelson also worked with this group until suffering a fatal heart attack in 1984.

After Reed's departure, Ram illegally continued to promote his own Platters group. Turner left in 1970 and was replaced by Monroe Powell, who remained a constant member from 1970 to 1995, amid many other line-up changes. Tony Williams formed his version of The Platters in 1971 and announced a worldwide tour. In 1995, a dispute between Powell and manager Jean Bennett (who had purchased Personality Productions, the booking/management arm of the Platters' business, from Ram in 1966) led to the two parting ways. At the time, the group's line-up was in limbo, leaving one person, Kenn Johnson, as the only other group member. Powell and Johnson continued touring as "The Platters", with Bennett hiring five new singers to be the "Buck Ram Platters".

Despite Ram and Bennett's assertions, it was later determined that Five Platters Inc., and Jean Bennett never had legitimate rights to The Platters name.

== Legal battles ==
A profusion of legal challenges ensued among the many groups of Platters. Those looking to hear the classic lineup of songs had their pick of approved, disputed, and substituted Platters, including Sonny Turner's, Zola Taylor's, Ritchie Jones' (member 1984–85), Milton Bullock's (member 1967–70), Paul Robi's (managed by his widow), Jean Bennett's "Buck Ram Platters", Monroe Powell's, Herb Reed's, and several other groups with no current ties to the original group. Many had once contained former members who were now retired or deceased.

Powell, who had been touring under the Platters' name, was sued by Bennett for breach of employment contract. Bennett and Powell later reached an agreement that Powell would be able to tour, but only as "The Platters featuring Monroe Powell". In 1994, Jean Bennett fraudulently used the name for a show at the Sahara Casino in Las Vegas; that show ran for 15 years.

Shortly before Robi succumbed to pancreatic cancer on February 1, 1989, he won a long court battle against Ram and was awarded compensation and the right to use the Platters' name. Those rights were stripped from Robi's widow in 1997, and required her to destroy all Platters promotional material, and the exclusive right to tour as "The Platters" was awarded to Reed. A series of rulings in 1999, 2002, and 2004 gave Bennett and The Five Platters, Inc,, the only entity who had used the name consistently since 1954, the common law right to the name. The 2002 case legally rescinded Reed's exclusive trademark rights, and the trademark was returned to the Five Platters, Inc. and Bennett.

In January 2006, Las Vegas based G.E.M. Group, Inc. presented Bennett with a contract to buy the assets of "the singing group The Platters." G.E.M. then took Personality Productions, Inc. (Bennett's separate management company) corporate records and files and attempted to take the company's phone numbers. There was an immediate disagreement between Bennett and G.E.M., which filed a lawsuit to attain certain corporate assets, Bennett's personal property and the assets of the 1950s"singing group The Platters." The case was dismissed for lack of action on G.E.M.s part. In June 2006, G.E.M. entered into an agreement with Sonny Turner, who had been the lead singer of the Platters from 1960 to 1970. Turner had not been able to bill himself as "The Platters" since 1972 due to a legal injunction. However, Turner later sued G.E.M.

In 2007, Reed discussed the abundance of touring Platters groups: "I have to laugh because when you ask me how I feel about it, I'm irate, I'm infuriated... I've lost 25 weeks of work a year." Herb Reed died in June 2012 at 83. Reed was the only group member to appear on every original Platters recording through 1969. Sonny Turner, who replaced Tony Williams in late 1959, performed as Sonny Turner, former lead singer of The Platters. Sonny brought The Platters back to the charts in 1966 with the hits, "I Love You 1000 Times", "With This Ring", and "Washed Ashore". He died on January 13, 2022.

In 2011, Herb Reed and his companies obtained judgments declaring that his rights to the name were superior to all others, including Five Platters Inc. and Jean Bennett. In March 2014, although Reed had died in 2012, Herb Reed's companies were granted a judgment finding they had superior rights to the name "The Platters" over Larry Marshak and his companies, who claimed to have received rights through FPI and/or Tony Williams In April 2014, Reed's company obtained a judgment against the World Famous Platters requiring them to identify themselves as a "Tribute to the Platters" or a "Salute to the Platters".

In June 2014, Herb Reed's companies obtained a judgment against former singer Monroe Powell for trademark infringement. The Nevada district court granted Reed summary judgment, awarding him over $59,000 in damages (from US and international tour performances) and permanent injunctive relief, preventing Powell from using the "Platters" name without using the words "tribute" or "salute".

In 2016, Herb Reed Enterprises LLC was awarded a trademark from the United States Patent and Trademark Office for the exclusive use of the Platters name. Reed's legacy is maintained by Frederick J. Balboni Jr., Reed's manager, veteran broadcast journalist, music promoter, and the owner of Massachusetts-based Balboni Communications Group LLC and Herb Reed Enterprises LLC.

== Personnel ==
=== Original lineup (1952–1953) ===
- Cornell Gunter
- Alex Hodge
- Gaynel Hodge
- Curtis Williams
- Joe Jefferson

=== Federal lineup (1953–1954) ===
- Tony Williams, lead singer
- Alex Hodge
- Gaynel Hodge
- David Lynch
- Herb Reed

=== Mercury Classic lineup (1955–1959) ===
- Tony Williams, lead singer
- Herb Reed
- David Lynch
- Paul Robi
- Zola Taylor

=== Mercury lineup (1959–1965) ===
- Sonny Turner, lead singer
- Herb Reed
- Paul Robi
- Zola Taylor
- David Lynch
- Barbara Randolph

=== Musicor lineup (1966–1970) ===
- Sonny Turner, lead singer
- Herb Reed
- Paul Robi
- David Lynch
- Nate Nelson
- Sandra Dawn
- Bob White

=== Official lineup ===
As of 2024:

- Lance Bernard Bryant
- Omar Ross
- Jovian Ford
- Brittany Michelle Wallace

== Singles discography ==
List of singles, with year of release, selected chart positions and album name shown
Title	Year	Peak chart positions					Album
Title	Year	US	BEL (Fl)	BEL (Wa)	NL	UK	Album
"Hey Now" b/w "Give Thanks"	January 1953	—	—	—	—	—	The Platters (Federal LP)
"Voo-Vee-Ah-Bee" b/w "Shake It Up Mambo"	November 1954	—	—	—	—	—	The Platters (Federal LP)
"Maggie Doesn't Work Here Anymore" b/w "Take Me Back, Take Me Back"	January 1955	—	—	—	—	—	The Platters (Federal LP)
"Only You (And You Alone)" b/w "Bark, Battle and Ball" (non-album track)	July 1955	5	4	5	—	5	Encore of Golden Hits
"The Great Pretender" b/w "I'm Just a Dancing Partner" (non-album track)	November 1955	1	5	3	1	5	Encore of Golden Hits
"I Need You All the Time" b/w "Tell the World"	December 1955	—	—	—	—	—	The Platters (Federal LP)
"(You've Got) The Magic Touch" b/w "Winner Take All" (non-album track)	February 1956	4	—	—	—	—	Encore of Golden Hits
"My Prayer"	June 1956	1	10	18	—	4	The Platters (Mercury LP)
"Heaven on Earth"	June 1956	39	—	—	—	—	The Platters (Mercury LP)
"You'll Never Never Know"	August 1956	11	—	—	—	23	Non-album singles
"It Isn't Right"	August 1956	13	—	—	—	23	Non-album singles
"On My Word of Honor"	November 1956	27	—	—	—	—	The Platters (Mercury LP)
"One in a Million"	November 1956	31	—	—	—	—	Encore of Golden Hits
"I'm Sorry"	February 1957	11	3	7	—	18	The Platters (Mercury LP)
"He's Mine"	February 1957	23	—	—	—	—	Non-album single
"My Dream" b/w "I Wanna" (from The Platters (Mercury LP))	February 1957	24	—	—	—	—	Encore of Golden Hits
"Only Because" b/w "The Mystery of You" (non-album track)	August 1957	65	12	24	—	—	The Flying Platters
"Helpless" b/w "Indiff'rent"	December 1957	56	—	—	—	—	Non-album single
"Twilight Time" b/w "Out of My Mind" (non-album track)	April 1958	1	20	—	—	3	The Flying Platters Around the World
"You're Making a Mistake" b/w "My Old Flame" (from The Flying Platters Around the World)	June 1958	51	—	—	—	—	Non-album single
"I Wish"	September 1958	42	—	—	—	—	More Encore of Golden Hits
"It's Raining Outside"	September 1958	93	—	—	—	—	The Flying Platters Around the World
"Smoke Gets in Your Eyes" b/w "No Matter What You Are" (non-album track)	October 1958	1	5	8	4	1	Remember When?
"Enchanted" b/w "The Sound and the Fury" (from More Encore of Golden Hits)	February 1959	12	—	—	—	—	Encore of Golden Hits
"Remember When" b/w "Love of a Lifetime" (non-album track)	May 1959	41	10	23	—	25	Remember When?
"Where"	September 1959	44	—	—	—	—	More Encore of Golden Hits
"Wish It Were Me"	September 1959	61	—	—	—	—	More Encore of Golden Hits
"Harbor Lights"	January 1960	8	—	—	—	11	Reflections
"Sleepy Lagoon"	January 1960	65	18	45	—	—	Reflections
"Ebb Tide"	May 1960	56	—	—	—	—	Reflections
"(I'll Be with You) In Apple Blossom Time"	May 1960	102	—	—	—	—	Life Is Just a Bowl Of Cherries
"Red Sails in the Sunset" b/w "Sad River"	August 1960	36	—	—	—	—	Reflections
"To Each His Own" b/w "Down the River of Golden Dreams" (from Reflections)	October 1960	21	—	—	—	—	More Encore of Golden Hits
"If I Didn't Care" b/w "True Lover" (from Song for the Lonely)	January 1961	30	—	—	—	—	Remember When?
"Trees" b/w "Immortal Love" (from Song for the Lonely)	1961	62	—	—	—	—	Life Is Just a Bowl of Cherries
"I'll Never Smile Again" b/w "You Don't Say" (non-album track)	July 1961	25	—	—	—	—	Remember When?
"You'll Never Know"	December 1961	109	—	—	—	—	Song for the Lonely
"Song for the Lonely"	November 1961	115	—	—	—	—	Song for the Lonely
"It's Magic" b/w "Reaching for a Star"	January 1962	91	—	—	—	—	Song for the Lonely
"More Than You Know" "b/w"Every Little Movement (Has Meaning All Its Own)"	May 1962	—	—	—	—	—	Encore of Golden Broadway Hits
"Heartbreak" b/w "Memories" (from The Platters Sing of Your Moonlight Memories)	November 1962	—	—	—	—	—	Non-album single
"Once In A While" "b/w"I'll See You in My Dreams"	March 1963	—	—	—	—	—	The Platters Sing of Your Moonlight Memories
"Here Comes Heaven Again" b/w "Strangers"	June 1963	—	—	—	—	—	Non-album single
"P.S. I Love You" "b/w"Sincerely"	June 1964	—	—	—	—	—	Encore of Golden Hits of the Groups
"I Love You 1,000 Times" b/w "Hear No Evil, Speak No Evil, See No Evil" (from Double Gold: The Best of The Platters)	April 1966	31	—	—	—	—	I Love You 1,000 Times
"Devri" b/w "Alone in the Night (Without You)"	September 1966	111	—	—	—	—	The Platters Have The Magic Touch
"I'll Be Home" b/w "(You've Got) The Magic Touch" (from The Platters Have the Magic Touch)	November 1966	97	—	—	—	—	I Love You 1,000 Times
"With This Ring" b/w "If I Had a Love" (from I Love You 1,000 Times)	February 1967	14	—	—	—	—	Going Back to Detroit
"Washed Ashore" b/w "What Name Shall I Give You My Love" (early copies) "One in a Million" (later copies) (Both B-sides from The Platters Have the Magic Touch)	June 1967	56	—	—	—	—	New Golden Hits
"Sweet, Sweet Lovin'" b/w "Sonata"	October 1967	70	—	—	—	—	Sweet, Sweet Lovin'
"Love Must Go On" b/w "How Beautiful Our Love Is" (from Sweet, Sweet Lovin')	December 1967	—	—	—	—	—	Going Back to Detroit
"Think Before You Walk Away" b/w "So Many Tears"	February 1968	—	—	—	—	—	I Get the Sweetest Feeling
"Hard to Get a Thing Called Love" b/w "Why"	August 1968	125	—	—	—	—	I Get the Sweetest Feeling
"Fear of Losing You" b/w "Sonata"	December 1968	—	—	—	—	—	I Get the Sweetest Feeling
