= Feudin' and Fightin' =

Single by Dorothy Shay

from the album Dorothy Shay (the Park Avenue Hillbillie) Sings
- Released: 1947
- Genre: Country
- Length: 3:13
- Label: Columbia
- Songwriters: Al Dubin, Burton Lane

"Feudin' and Fightin'" is a song written by Al Dubin and Burton Lane, sung by Dorothy Shay (billed as "The Park Avenue Hillbilly"), and released in 1947 on the Columbia label (catalog no. 37189). In August 1947, it reached No. 4 on the Billboard Best Selling Retail Folk chart, as well as #4 on the pop chart.

It was also ranked as the No. 12 record on the Billboard 1947 year-end folk juke box chart.

== Other recordings ==
- Jo Stafford had a top-10 hit with the song in October 1947.
