= Al Jolson Souvenir Album =

Studio album by Al Jolson
- Released: 1947
- Label: Decca

Al Jolson chronology
Al Jolson in Songs He Made Famous (1946)	Al Jolson Souvenir Album (1947)	Al Jolson, Volume 3 (1948)

Professional ratings
Review scores
Source	Rating
Billboard	positive

Al Jolson Souvenir Album (also known as simply Al Jolson Album and later as Al Jolson – Volume 2) is a studio album recorded by Al Jolson for Decca. It was released in 1947 as a set of four 78-rpm phonograph records (catalog no. 575).

== Release ==
The album was originally released as a set of four 10-inch 78-rpm phonograph records (cat. no. A-575).

== Content and reception ==
On this album, Jolson is accompanied by an orchestra directed by Morris Stoloff.

Billboard positively reviewed the album in its issue from September 13, 1947.

The album reached number one on Billboard's Best-Selling Popular Record Albums chart.

== 33-rpm and 45-rpm re-releases ==
Later, the album was made available on 33 rpm (one 10-inch LP, cat. no. DL 5029) and 45 rpm (a set of four 7-inch records, cat. no. 9-8).

== Track listing ==
Set of four 10-inch 78-rpm records (Decca A-575)

Side 1
No.	Title	Writer(s)	Note(s)	Length
1.	"Waiting for the Robert E. Lee"	L. Wolfe Gilbert—Lewis F. Muir	Vocal with orchestra directed by Morris Stoloff

Side 2
No.	Title	Writer(s)	Note(s)	Length
1.	"When You Were Sweet Sixteen"	James Thornton	Vocal with quartet and orchestra directed by Morris Stoloff

Side 3
No.	Title	Writer(s)	Note(s)	Length
1.	"Golden Gate"	Al Jolson—Joseph Meyer—Billy Rose—Dave Dreyer	Vocal with orchestra directed by Morris Stoloff

Side 4
No.	Title	Writer(s)	Note(s)	Length
1.	"I'm Sitting on Top of the World (Just Rolling Along – Just Rolling Along)"	Ray Henderson—, Sam Lewis—Joe Young	Vocal with orchestra directed by Morris Stoloff

Side 5
No.	Title	Writer(s)	Note(s)	Length
1.	"Toot Toot Tootsie! (Goo' Bye)"	Gus Kahn—Ernie Erdman—Dan Russo	Vocal with orchestra directed by Morris Stoloff

Side 6
No.	Title	Lyrics	Note(s)	Length
1.	"Back in Your Own Back Yard"	Al Jolson—Billy Rose—Dave Dreyer	Vocal with orchestra directed by Morris Stoloff

Side 7
No.	Title	Writer(s)	Note(s)	Length
1.	"Carolina in the Morning"	Walter Donaldson—Gus Kahn	Vocal with orchestra directed by Morris Stoloff

Side 8
No.	Title	Writer(s)	Note(s)	Length
1.	"Liza (All the Clouds'll Roll Away)"	George Gershwin—Ira Gershwin—Gus Kahn	Vocal with orchestra directed by Morris Stoloff

10-inch LP (Decca DL 5029)

Side 1
No.	Title	Length
1.	"Waiting for the Robert E. Lee"
2.	"When You Were Sweet Sixteen"
3.	"Golden Gate"
4.	"I'm Sitting on Top of the World"

Side 2
No.	Title	Length
1.	"Toot-Toot, Tootsie! (Goo'Bye)"
2.	"Back in Your Own Back Yard"
3.	"Carolina in the Morning"
4.	"Liza (All the Clouds'll Roll Away)"

== Charts ==
Chart (1947)	Peak position
US Billboard Best-Selling Popular Record Albums	1

Year-end charts

Chart (1947)	Peak position
US Billboard – The Year's Top Selling Popular Albums over Retail Counters	4

== See also ==
- List of Billboard Best-Selling Popular Record Albums number ones of 1947
