= Dorothy Shay (the Park Avenue Hillbillie) Sings =

Studio album by Dorothy Shay
- Released: 1946
- Genre: Jazz, traditional pop, novelty song
- Label: Columbia

Dorothy Shay chronology
Dorothy Shay (the Park Avenue Hillbillie) Sings (1946)	Dorothy Shay (the Park Avenue Hillbillie) Goes to Town (1947)

Dorothy Shay (the Park Avenue Hillbillie) Sings is the debut studio album by Dorothy Shay (a.k.a. the Park Avenue Hillbillie), released by Columbia Records in 1946.

== Background ==
The album was originally released as a set of four 10-inch 78-rpm phonograph records (cat. no. C-119). Some years later, it was re-issued on a 10-inch LP record (cat. no. CL 6003).

== Reception ==
Professional ratings
Review scores
Source	Rating
Steinway Review of Permanent Music	no rating

Professional ratings
The Park Avenue Hillbillie Sings Feudin' & Fightin' (2001 CD)
Review scores
Source	Rating
AllMusic	3/5 stars

The Steinway Review of Permanent Music magazine described the album as containing "eight ditties which sophisticated Hollywood and New York audiences, and GIs on USO routes, most applauded when [Dorothy Shay, the Park Avenue Hillbillie,] sang them in person."

The album spent several weeks at number one on Billboard's Best-Selling Popular Retail Records chart. It became the second best-selling album of the year according to the magazine.

== Track listing ==
Set of four 10-inch 78-rpm records (Columbia set C-119)

Side 1
No.	Title	Writer(s)	Length
1.	"Feudin' and Fightin'"	Dubin; Lane

Side 2
No.	Title	Writer(s)	Length
1.	"Say That We're Sweethearts Again"	Brent

Side 3
No.	Title	Writer(s)	Length
1.	"Mountain Gal"	Marks; Koppell

Side 4
No.	Title	Writer(s)	Length
1.	"Efficiency"	H. Smith; Shay

Side 5
No.	Title	Writer(s)	Length
1.	"Flat River, Missouri"	Shannon

Side 6
No.	Title	Writer(s)	Length
1.	"I've Been to Hollywood"	Merrill

Side 7
No.	Title	Writer(s)	Length
1.	"Uncle Fud"	A. Jones; Shay

Side 8
No.	Title	Writer(s)	Length
1.	"I'm in Love with a Married Man"	Graham

== Personnel ==
- Dorothy Shay, vocals
- Orchestra under the direction of Mischa Russell

== Charts ==
Chart (1947)	Peak position
US Billboard Best-Selling Popular Retail Records	1

Year-end charts

Chart (1947)	Peak position
US Billboard – The Year's Top Selling Popular Albums over Retail Counters	2

== See also ==
- List of Billboard Best-Selling Popular Record Albums number ones of 1947
