= Only You (And You Alone) =

Pop song composed by Buck Ram

"Only You (And You Alone)" (often shortened to "Only You") is a doo-wop song recorded by American band the Platters and released in June 1955. It was written and composed by Buck Ram, the group's producer and manager who was earlier a successful songwriter; lead vocals are by Tony Williams. The song charted in the US, the UK and Belgium.

Other well-known versions have been recorded by Louis Armstrong, the Hilltoppers, Franck Pourcel and Ringo Starr. American country music versions were released by Travis Tritt, Reba McEntire, Bobby Hatfield and the Statler Brothers. In the UK, the most widely heard versions are those by the Platters, Ringo Starr, the band Child and the actor John Alford. In Norway, a version by Stein Ingebrigtsen charted in the Norwegian language. American singer Brenda Lee scored a hit in Belgium with her version.

== The Platters' original versions ==
"Only You (And You Alone)"
- Mercury hit version

Single by the Platters

from the album The Platters
- B-side: "Bark, Battle and Ball"
- Released: July 2, 1955
- Recorded: April 26, 1955
- Genre: Doo-wop
- Length: 2:36
- Label: Mercury
- Songwriter: Buck Ram

The Platters singles chronology
"Maggie Doesn't Work Here Anymore" (1954)	"Only You (And You Alone)" (1955)	"The Great Pretender" (1955)

The Platters first recorded the song for Federal Records on May 20, 1954, but the recording was left on the shelf. After moving to Mercury Records in 1955, the band re-recorded the song on April 26, and the disc appeared at radio and retail in early July. By the fall "Only You" was a major hit in pop and r&b markets. Come November, Federal Records tried to capitalize on the success by issuing the original recording as a single (with "You Made Me Cry" on the B-side), but it sold poorly.

Platters bass singer Herb Reed recalled how the group hit upon its successful version: "We tried it so many times, and it was terrible. One time we were rehearsing in the car ... and the car jerked. Tony went 'O-oHHHH-nly you'. We laughed at first, but when he sang that song, that was the sign we had hit on something". According to Buck Ram, Tony Williams' voice "broke" in rehearsal, but they decided to keep this effect in the recording. This was the only Platters recording on which songwriter and manager Ram played the piano.

The song held strong in the number-one position on the U.S. R&B charts for seven weeks, and hit number five on the Billboard Best Sellers in Stores chart. It remained on the charts for 30 weeks, beating out a rival cover version by the Hilltoppers. When the Platters track, "The Great Pretender" (which eventually surpassed the success of "Only You"), was released in the UK as Europe's first introduction to the group, "Only You" was included on the B-side. In the 1956 film Rock Around the Clock, the Platters participated with both songs.

The Platters re-recorded a slightly longer version of the song for Musicor Records in 1966, which features on the album I Love You 1,000 Times (MM 2091).

In 1999, the 1955 recording on Mercury Records was inducted into the Grammy Hall of Fame.

The Platters' version was featured in the films American Graffiti (1973), Superman (1978), The War of the Roses (1989), The Man in the Moon (1991), October Sky (1999), Senior Year (2022), and Deadpool & Wolverine (2024), as well as the television series Fallout (2024) and the video game Far Cry 5 (2018).

=== Charts ===
Chart (1955–1957)	Peak position
Belgium (Ultratop 50 Flanders)	4
Belgium (Ultratop 50 Wallonia)	5
US R&B Records Most Played by Jockeys (Billboard)	1
US Best Sellers in Stores (Billboard)	5

== The Hilltoppers version ==
The Hilltoppers released their version of the song as a Dot Records single in 1955. It reached number 8 on the Billboard Hot 100 and number 3 in the UK.

== Franck Pourcel version ==
An instrumental version by Franck Pourcel was a hit single in 1959, and sold more than 5 million copies. Pourcel's version spent 16 weeks on the Billboard Hot 100, reaching number 9, while reaching number 3 on Canada's CHUM Hit Parade, and number 18 on Billboard's Hot R&B Sides.

== Ringo Starr version ==
"Only You"
- Standard picture sleeve

Single by Ringo Starr

from the album Goodnight Vienna
- B-side: "Call Me"
- Released: 11 November 1974 (US); 15 November 1974 (UK)
- Length: 3:16
- Label: Apple
- Songwriter: Buck Ram
- Producer: Richard Perry

Ringo Starr singles chronology
"Oh My My" (1974)	"Only You" (1974)	"No No Song" (1974)

In 1974, Ringo Starr covered this song for his album Goodnight Vienna at the suggestion of John Lennon. This version was released as a single (b/w "Call Me") on 11 November in the US, and it became a number six hit on the US Billboard best seller chart and reached number one on the Easy Listening chart in early 1975. In Canada, the song also reached number one on the RPM middle-of-the-road chart and number 17 on the top singles chart within the same period. It was released in the UK on 15 November. Lennon plays acoustic guitar on the track, and recorded a guide vocal which was kept by producer Richard Perry. Harry Nilsson sings harmony vocals and appears with Starr in the music video filmed on top of the Capitol Records Building in Los Angeles. Lennon's vocal version appears on his Anthology box set, in 1998.

=== Charts ===
Chart (1974–1975)	Peak position
Canada Top Singles (RPM)	17
Canada Pop Music Playlist (RPM)	1
US Hot 100 (Billboard)	6
US Adult Contemporary (Billboard)	1

== Other cover versions ==
- Travis Tritt released his version of the song as a single in January 1996, where it peaked at number 52 on the Hot Country Songs Chart and number 28 on the Canadian RPM Country Tracks Chart. It was Tritt's first single to miss the Top 40 on the Hot Country Songs Chart.
- Brenda Lee covered the song on her 1962 album Sincerely, Brenda Lee. When released as a single in Belgium, Lee's version reached number 3 in Flanders and number 44 in Wallonia.
- In 1963, Mr. Acker Bilk recorded the song as an instrumental number, which reached number 77 (U.S.).
- Bobby Hatfield of the Righteous Brothers released a version in 1969, which reached number 95 on the Billboard Hot 100.
- Edita Piekha covered the song as "Только Ты" in 1963; it was popular in the USSR.
- English singer Jeff Collins from Enfield recorded the song in 1972. It was popular in Europe, and rose to number 40 in the UK charts, charting for eight weeks.
- In 1973, the singer Stein Ingebrigtsen had a number one hit on Norway's VG-lista with a Norwegian version of the song, entitled "Bare du". The lyrics were written by the record producer Arve Sigvaldsen. A Swedish version of the song, "Bara du", also recorded by Ingebrigtsen, became popular in that country. Ingebrigtsen also recorded a German version entitled "So wie du" with lyrics written by Ralph-Maria Siegel.
- The pop band Child released the song as a single in 1979, reaching number 33 in the UK Charts.
- Reba McEntire had a number 13 hit on the U.S. Country music charts with her cover on her 1981 album Heart to Heart.
- The Statler Brothers covered the song on their 1986 album Four for the Show. Their version was released as a single and peaked at number 36 on the Billboard Hot Country Singles chart. A music video was made for the song and was shot at Opryland USA.
- John Alford recorded the song as a double-A side with "Blue Moon" in 1996, which reached number 9 in the UK charts.

== See also ==
- List of number-one rhythm and blues hits (United States)
- List of number-one adult contemporary singles of 1975 (U.S.)
