= (You've Got) The Magic Touch =

1956 song by Buck Ram

Single by The Platters
- B-side: "Winner Take All"
- Released: February 20, 1956
- Recorded: February 14, 1956
- Studio: Mercury Sound Studio, New York City
- Genre: R&B
- Length: 2:22
- Label: Mercury
- Songwriter(s): Buck Ram

The Platters singles chronology
| "I Need You All the Time" (1955) | "(You've Got) The Magic Touch" (1956) | "My Prayer" (1956) |

"(You've Got) The Magic Touch" is a song written by Buck Ram, and performed by The Platters. It reached #4 on both the U.S. pop chart and the U.S. R&B chart in 1956.

The song was ranked #36 on Billboard magazine's Top 50 singles of 1956.

== Other versions ==
- The song was sampled in the 1956 novelty song "The Flying Saucer" by Bill Buchanan and Dickie Goodman.
- Buck Ram and His Orchestra released a version on their 1959 EP The Magic Touch.
- Billy Walker released a version as a single in 1977, but it did not chart.
