= Country Doctor =

A country doctor is (or was) a physician who works with a rural health focus, out in the country. In many regions the town-and-country distinction no longer corresponds to large differences in practice patterns.

Country Doctor as the title of a work may refer to:

== Arts and Entertainment ==
=== Literature ===
- A Country Doctor (novel), an 1884 novel by Sarah Orne Jewett
- "A Country Doctor" (short story), a 1919 short story by Franz Kafka
- "A Country Doctor" (short story collection), a 1919 collection of short stories by Franz Kafka
- Le Médecin de campagne (English: The Country Doctor), an 1833 novel by Honoré de Balzac

=== Film ===
- The Country Doctor (1909 film), a film directed by D.W. Griffith
- The Country Doctor (1927 film), directed by Rupert Julian
- The Country Doctor (1936 film), directed by Henry King
- A Country Doctor (film), a 2007 animated film directed by Koji Yamamura, based on the Kafka story
- Médecin de campagne, a 2016 French film, released under two English titles, The Country Doctor and Irreplaceable

=== Music ===
- "Country Doctor", a song on the album Hot House (Bruce Hornsby album)
- "Country Doctor", a song on the album Crippled Lucifer by US- Sludge Metal Band Burning Witch

== Other ==
- Landarzt, Country Doctor in German
