= The Three Suns =

American pop group (1939–1966)

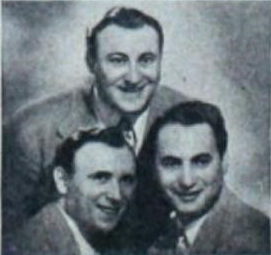
- 1945 advertisement

Background information
- Origin: United States
- Genre: Pop
- Years active: 1939–1966
- Past members: Al Nevins; Morty Nevins; Artie Dunn; George Barnes; Johnny Buck (Bucky Pizzarelli); Joe Negri; Joe Vento; Frank Fiore; Johnny Romano; Tony Lovello; Del Casher; Vincent Bell; Fred Mendelsohn; Eddie Layton

The Three Suns were an American pop group, most popular during the 1940s and 1950s.

== Career history ==
The group was formed in 1939 by brothers Al Nevins (guitar) and Morty Nevins (accordion) and their cousin, radio and vaudeville veteran Artie Dunn (vocals, electronic organ). A popular nightclub attraction around New York, in 1944, they were signed to perform in nine short musical films for the Soundies movie jukeboxes.

A review in Billboard in 1942 addressed the group's potential. Referring to a December 13, 1941, remote broadcast from New York's Hotel Piccadilly on NBC Red, Dick Carter wrote: "Here was something out of the ordinary, and very welcome, too. The Three Suns are an electric organ, an accordion and guitar, and they produce some sensational musical effects."

In 1944, the Three Suns scored their first hit record, "Twilight Time"; their version was strictly instrumental and did not feature the lyrics written later by Buck Ram. "Twilight Time" sold over four million copies and was awarded a gold record.

In November 1946, an instrumental version of "Rumors Are Flying" was #1 in America.

This was followed by "Peg o' My Heart", which was one of the biggest hits of 1947 in the United States. The group was featured in the Alfred Hitchcock film Rope (1948) performing an off-screen "radio sequence", and in Two Gals and a Guy (1951). The band is also notable in that they were reputed to have been the favorite musical group of former First Lady Mamie Eisenhower.

During the 1950s, the group continued to make live appearances with the same personnel, but their RCA Victor recording sessions would often have studio musicians substituting for one or another, because keyboardist Artie Dunn did not read music and guitarist Al Nevins became much more interested in the production end of the record business. The group's popularity began to wane as rock and roll became popular in the mid 1950s, but the group reinvented itself by using its RCA Victor recording sessions as an audio laboratory, employing additional instruments and novel stereophonic effects. These new arrangements became popular among fans of lounge music and exotica. Al Nevins remained with RCA Victor as a producer and arranger until his death in 1965; Morty Nevins then hired studio musicians Fred Mendelssohn and Vinnie Bell and recorded a new stereo album for Musicor in 1966, using the Three Suns name.

Founding member Al Nevins was also co-founder of Aldon Music, a Brill Building songwriting company.

== Members ==
Founding members

- Artie Dunn – vocals, organ (died January 15, 1996, age 73)
- Al Nevins – guitar (died January 25, 1965, age 49)
- Morty Nevins – accordion (died July 23, 1990, age 73)

Later members

- George Barnes – guitar
- Johnny Buck (Bucky Pizzarelli) – guitar
- Joe Negri – guitar
- Joe Vento – accordion, piano
- Johnny Romano – guitar
- Tony Lovello – accordion
- Del Casher (Del Kacher) – guitar
- Vincent Bell – guitar
- Fred Mendelsohn – organ
- Eddie Layton – organ

== Discography ==
The first records released by the Three Suns, during the 1940s and 1950s, were 78 rpm discs. Between 1950 and 1954, RCA Victor issued several 10-inch long play albums. In 1955, the Three Suns released their first 12-inch LP, Soft & Sweet and in 1958, their first stereo LP.

The Three Suns recorded a number of sides for V-Disc in the 1940s, which were only issued by the US Government to the USO units overseas. These sides were reissued on a two-CD set in 1997 by IMC Licensing. Most of the titles were not sequenced on the CD as they appeared on the original 78s.

Albums

- Twilight Time (Majestic, M2, 1944) (10 inch)
- Beyond the Blue Horizon (Fox Trot Vocal Chorus by Artie Dunn) / Crazy Rhythm (Instrumental Fox Trot) - (Decca, 69638 & 69636, 1947) (10 inch)
- Twilight Time (Varsity, 6001, 1950) (10 inch)
- Midnight Time (Varsity, 6048, 1950) (10 inch)
- You and the Night and the Music (RCA Victor, 47-4202A, 1951) (7 INCH 45 RPM)
- Yours is My Heart Alone (RCA Victor, 47-4202B, 1951) (7 INCH 45 RPM)
- Twilight Time (Royale, 1, 1951) (10 inch)
- Midnight Time (Royale, 29, 1951) (10 inch)
- Three Quarter Time (RCA Victor, LPM-3, 1951) (10 inch)
- Hands Across the Table (RCA Victor, LPM-28, 1951)(10 inch)
- Twilight Moods (RCA Victor, LPM-3012, 1952) (10 inch)
- The Three Suns Present (RCA Victor, LPM-3034, 1952) (10 inch)
- Busy Fingers (RCA Victor, LPM-3040, 1952)
- Christmas Party (RCA Victor, LPM-3056, 1952) (10 inch)
- Soft and Sweet (RCA Victor, LPM-1041, 1955) U.S. #13
- Sounds of Christmas (RCA Victor, LPM-1132, 1955)
- Twilight Time (RCA Victor, LPM-1171, 1956)
- My Reverie (RCA Victor, LPM-1173, 1956)
- Slumber Time (RCA Victor, LPM-1219, 1956)
- High Fi and Wide (RCA Victor, LPM-1249, 1956) U.S. #19
- Easy Listening (RCA Victor LPM-1316, 1956)
- Midnight for Two (RCA Victor, LPM-1333, 1957) U.S. #16
- Malaguena (RCA Victor LPM-1220, 1956)
- Things I Love in Hi-Fi (RCA Victor, LPM/LSP-1543, 1958)
- Let's Dance with the Three Suns (RCA Victor, LPM/LSP-1578, 1958)
- Happy Go Lucky Sound (RCA Camden, CAL-454, 1958)
- My Reverie (RCA Victor, LSP-1173, 1958)
- Love in the Afternoon (RCA Victor, LSP-1669, 1959)
- Having a Ball with the Three Suns (RCA Victor, LSP-1734, 1958)
- Swingin' on a Star (RCA Victor, LPM/LSP-1964, 1959)
- A Ding Dong Dandy Christmas! (RCA Victor, LPM/LSP-2054, 1959)
- At the Candlelight Cafe (RCA Camden, CAL-513, 1959)
- Twilight Memories (RCA Victor, LPM/LSP-2120, 1960)
- On a Magic Carpet (RCA Victor, LPM/LSP-2235, 1960)
- Twilight Time (RCA Victor, LPC-110, 1961) (COMPACT 33 DOUBLE)
- Dancing on a Cloud (RCA Victor, LPM/LSP-2307, 1961)
- Fever & Smoke (RCA Victor LPM/LSP-2310, 1961)
- Fun in the Sun (RCA Victor LPM/LSP-2437, 1961)
- In Orbit (Tops, 9756, 1962)
- Movin' 'N' Groovin' (RCA Victor LPM/LSP-2532, 1962)
- Warm and Tender (RCA Victor LPM/LSP-2617, 1962)
- Everything Under the Sun (RCA Victor, LPM/LSP-2715, 1963)
- One Enchanted Evening (RCA Victor LPM/LSP-2904, 1964)
- A Swingin' Thing (RCA Victor LPM/LSP-2963, 1964)
- Country Music Shindig (RCA Victor LPM/LSP-3354, 1965)
- Continental Affair (RCA Camden CAL 573)
- The Best of the Three Suns (RCA Victor LPM/LSP-3447(e), 1966)
- 16 Greatest Hits (Musicor, MM2090/MS3090, 1966)
- This Is the Three Suns (RCA Victor VPS-6075, 1971)
- Mean To Me (RCA Camden ACL1-0085, 1973)
- Pure Gold (RCA ANL1-1779(e), 1976)

== Filmography ==
- Nine Soundies musicals (1944)
- Rope (1948) directed by Alfred Hitchcock; offscreen performers in radio sequence
- Two Gals and a Guy (1951)

== In popular culture ==
- Cavalcade of Stars (1950) episode 1.65
- The Ed Sullivan Show (1950) episodes 3.38 and 3.39
- The Kate Smith Hour (1953) December 29, 1953 episode, which mentions them as having appeared on previous episodes
- Captain Chesapeake (1971 to 1990) The theme song was the Bob Crosby tune "Stumbling" by the Three Suns. This theme was played from a 33 rpm at 45 rpm speed.
- "Worry Worry Worry" released by the Three Suns in 1948 was featured in the role-playing videogame Fallout 4 by Bethesda Game Studios in-game radio.
