= Zola Taylor =

American musician (1938–2007)

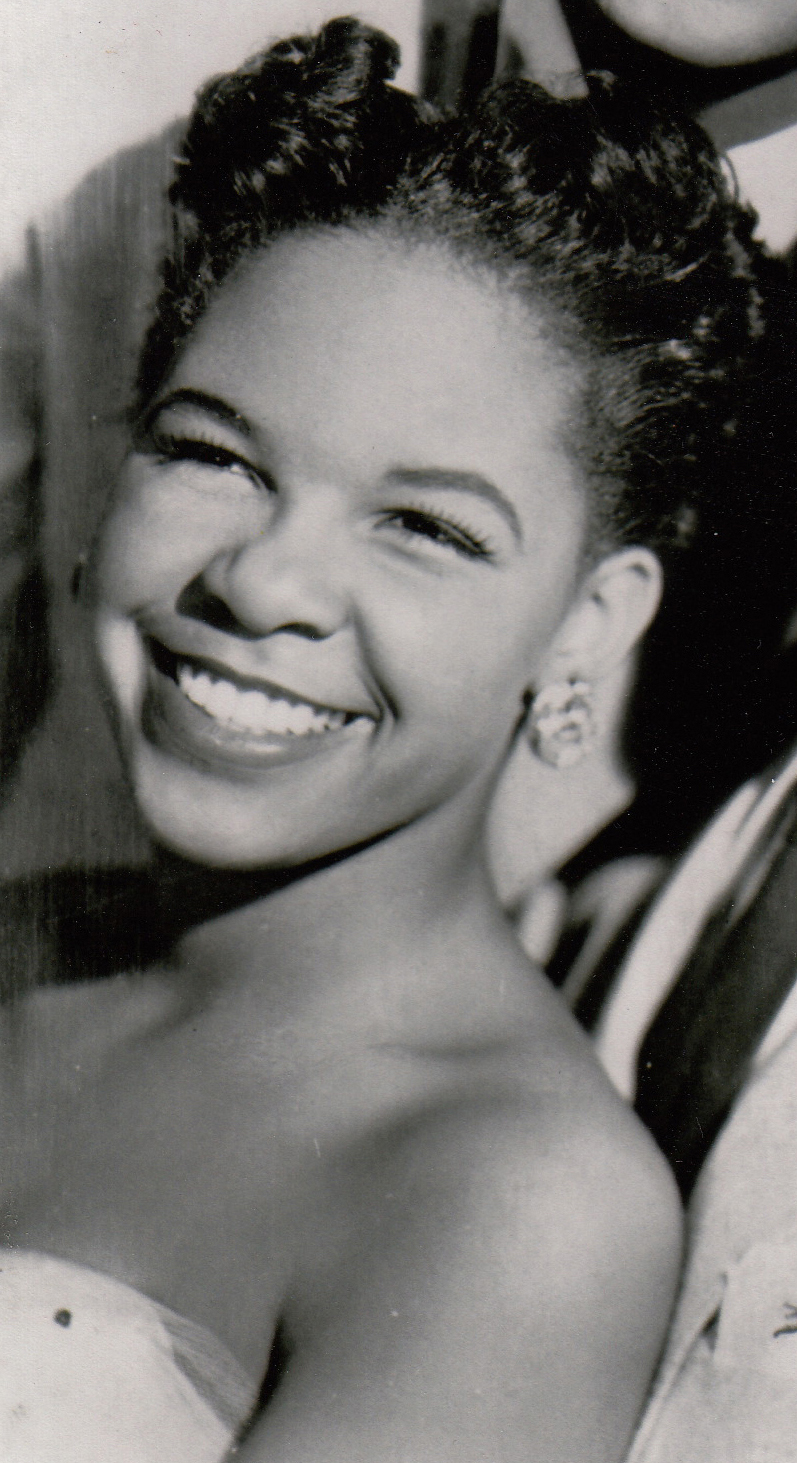
- Taylor in 1955

Background information
- Born: Zoletta Lynn Taylor; March 17, 1938; Los Angeles, California, U.S.
- Died: April 30, 2007 (aged 69) Riverside, California, U.S.
- Genres: Rock and Roll; Blues; R&B
- Occupations: Singer; musician
- Instrument: Vocals
- Years active: 1950–1967

Zoletta Lynn "Zola" Taylor (March 17, 1938 – April 30, 2007) was an American singer and musician. Beginning her career in the early 1950s, Taylor was the original female member of the American vocal group The Platters from 1954 until 1962, when the group produced most of their popular singles.

== Litigation ==
Zola Taylor was a member of The Platters until 1962, when she was replaced by singer Barbara Randolph. Taylor was the second of Frankie Lymon's three wives. In 1984, on behalf of Emira Lymon, a lawyer and artists' agent sued to wrest the copyright of Frankie's hit song "Why Do Fools Fall in Love" away from the current owner. The case became confused when it looked like Lymon had a second and possibly a third widow. Elizabeth Waters claimed to have married Lymon in 1964 in Virginia. However, it turned out she had been married to someone else at the time. As Waters' claim went to court, Taylor claimed that she had been sexually active with Lymon as early as the "Biggest Rock 'n' Roll Show of 1956" tour. She claimed to have married Lymon in Mexicali, Mexico, around 1965, but could not produce a marriage license. The first hearing, held in Philadelphia, was decided in favor of Waters being Lymon's first wife. Emira Eagle, his third wife, appealed and won a reversal based on her claim that she was Lymon's first wife.

== Accomplishments, death and legacy ==
Taylor appeared with The Platters in the first rock'n'roll film, Rock Around the Clock. In 1990, Taylor was elected to the Rock and Roll Hall of Fame as a member of The Platters. On April 30, 2007, Zola Taylor died in Riverside, California, at the age of 69, from pneumonia, following a series of strokes. Taylor is portrayed by Halle Berry in the 1998 film Why Do Fools Fall in Love.
