= Linda Hayes (singer) =

American singer (1923–1998)

Linda Hayes (born Bertha Lulu Williams, December 10, 1923 – May 26, 1998) was an American rhythm and blues singer.

== Biography ==
She was born in Linden, New Jersey and was the sister of The Platters' lead singer, Tony Williams. The family moved to Hollywood, California. In the early 1950s she recorded two singles backed by the Red Callender Sextet, with Callender on (bass), Maxwell Davis (tenor sax), Floyd Turnham (baritone sax), Chico Hamilton (drums) and Monroe Tucker (piano). The first, "Yes! I Know" – an answer record to Willie Mabon's "I Don't Know" – entered the Billboard R&B chart on February 7, 1953 and reached No. 2 while the second single, "What's It to You, Jack"/"Atomic Baby" was recorded in spring 1953. She had a second hit when "Take Me Back" reached No. 10 on the R&B chart in 1954.

In late 1954 and early 1955 she recorded a series of singles for King Records with The Platters accompanying her. She was also backed by Big Jim Wynn's Band. In the mid-1950s she headed the billing of the Hollywood Records Revue, which included Roy Brown, Johnny "Guitar" Watson, and the Tommy Jones Orchestra. She recorded in 1956 with the Earle Warren Orchestra and in 1959 with the Ray Scott Band.

She died in 1998 in Atlanta, Georgia, at the age of 74.
