= Dorothy Shay =

Musical artist (1921–1978)

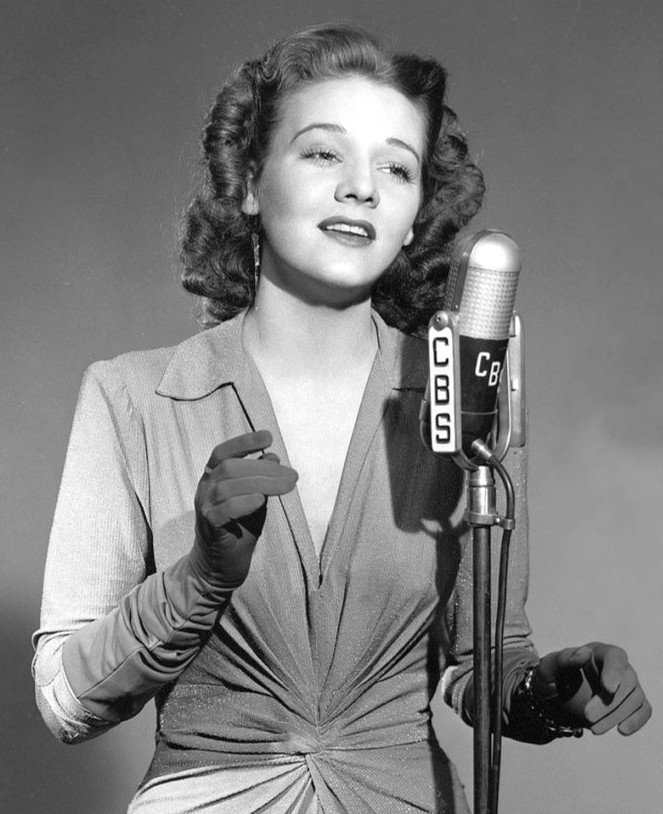
- Dorothy Shay on Cresta Blanca Carnival circa 1940s

Background information
- Born: Dorothy Sims; April 21, 1921; Jacksonville, Florida, U.S.
- Died: October 22, 1978 (aged 57) Santa Monica, California, U.S.
- Genres: Pop, novelty
- Occupations: Singer; Actress
- Instrument: Vocals
- Years active: 1945–1978
- Labels: Columbia, Capitol, Imperial

Dorothy Shay (April 11, 1921 – October 22, 1978) was an American popular comedic recording artist in the late 1940s and early 1950s, who later became a character actress. She was known as the "Park Avenue Hillbillie".

== Early life ==
Shay was born Dorothy Sims in Jacksonville, Florida. She began singing at the county jail around age 4. She attended Lee High School. Her father, Claud Sims, operated a chain of service stations. After his death, financial difficulties led to the family's selling their house and her mother's opening a tea room.

== Career ==
Shay sang on a 15-minute radio program on WJHP in Jacksonville. After that she obtained a job in the floor show at the Roosevelt Hotel. An audition with Music Corporation of America in Pittsburgh resulted in her singing with Paul Pendarvis and his orchestra.

When she began her career as a "straight" singer, she took vocal lessons to lose her Southern accent. She sang for the USO during World War II. She changed her name to "Shay" so she wouldn't be confused with Ginny Simms, another vocalist of the day, choosing "Shay" to honor her mentor Betty Shay (later Betty Corday).

Through an audition she was selected out of 200 applicants to sing with Morton Gould and his orchestra on the Cresta Blanca radio program. While performing with Gould and his orchestra, she performed an encore, "Uncle Fud", a hayseed novelty number that became popular and launched her solo singing career.

== "The Park Avenue Hillbillie" ==
A press agent applied "The Park Avenue Hillbillie" description to Shay in 1945. She signed with Columbia Records and recorded a series of hit records. Her biggest hit was "Feudin' and Fightin'" in 1947, the year she joined Spike Jones's CBS radio show as the female vocalist. That same year, her album, Dorothy Shay (the Park Avenue Hillbillie) Sings, was rated #1 in Billboard magazine's Best-Selling Popular Albums. This album was part of Columbia's initial catalogue of 101 LP records, which were the first LPs ever released. Shay was the first female artist to have a #1 album on the Billboard chart.

In her singing engagements, she performed dressed as a sophisticated urbanite while talking like a rural Southerner. She was popular in nightclubs, radio, and television. The 1951 Abbott and Costello movie Comin' Round The Mountain featured special introductory billing as Dorothy Shay's first motion picture; she played a nightclub singer involved in a hillbilly feud. The film was an excellent showcase for her musical and comic talents; all five musical numbers were performed by Shay.

Shay was the musical guest on the second (television) season premiere of The Jack Benny Program in November 1951. She performed at President Eisenhower's Inaugural Ball in 1953. She recorded for Capitol Records and Imperial Records where she recorded a rockabilly song titled "Hunky Dory". In 1970 she appeared as Widow Krebs in the TV Western The Virginian episode titled "You Can Lead a Horse to Water."

== Personal life ==
She was married briefly to Dick Looman from 1958 to 1959. After a period of inactivity in the 1960s, she returned to show business as a character actress in the 1970s. She had a recurring role as Thelma, first owner of the Dew Drop Inn, in the TV series The Waltons.

== Death ==
Shay was 57 when she died of a heart attack on October 22, 1978, in Santa Monica, California. Upon her death, the writers of The Waltons wrote her character off, with the mention that she sold the Dew Drop Inn and moved to California.

== Discography ==
Title	Details	Peak
Title	Details	US
Dorothy Shay (the Park Avenue Hillbillie) Sings	Released: 1946; Label: Columbia	1
Dorothy Shay (the Park Avenue Hillbillie) Goes to Town	Released: 1947; Label: Columbia	1
