= Twilight Time (1944 song) =

- Japanese release picture sleeve

Single by the Platters
- B-side: "Out of My Mind"
- Released: April 1958
- Genre: R&B; traditional pop
- Length: 2:47
- Label: Mercury 71289
- Songwriters: Buck Ram; Morty Nevins; Al Nevins; Artie Dunn

The Platters singles chronology
"Helpless" (1958)	"Twilight Time" (1958)	"You're Making a Mistake" (1958)

"Twilight Time" is a popular song with lyrics by Buck Ram and music by the Three Suns (Morty Nevins, Al Nevins, and Artie Dunn). Ram said that he originally wrote it as a poem, without music, while in college.

Original instrumental recordings of "Twilight Time" included those made respectively by the Three Suns (1944) and Les Brown & His Band of Renown (1945).

Les Brown's version of "Twilight Time" was recorded in November 1944 and released in early 1945 as the B-side of "Sentimental Journey," the first recording of that song. While the A-side featured Doris Day's vocals, "Twilight Time" was an instrumental.

== The Platters recording ==
It has been recorded by numerous groups over the years. However, the best-known version of the song was recorded by the Platters and became a No.1 hit on both the pop singles and R&B best sellers charts in 1958 in the United States. The song also reached No.3 in the United Kingdom and Canada. In 1963, the Platters recorded a Spanish version of the song entitled "La Hora del Crepúsculo", sung in a rhumba-style tempo.

The Platters version of the song was featured in the official trailer for the Disney+ show WandaVision; it also serves as a plot point in The X-Files episode "Kill Switch".

== Other notable versions ==
- Yvette Giraud, (1958), French version, as Les Amoureux.
- Andy Williams reached No.86 on the Billboard Hot 100 in 1962
- Willie Nelson, on his album What a Wonderful World (1988). Nelson's version peaked at No.41 on the Billboard Hot Country Singles chart in 1989.
