= Buck Ram =

American musician (1907–1991)

- Born: Samuel Ram; November 21, 1907; Chicago, Illinois, U.S.
- Died: January 1, 1991 (aged 83) Las Vegas, Nevada, U.S.
- Occupations: Songwriter; producer

Samuel "Buck" Ram (November 21, 1907 – January 1, 1991) was an American songwriter, and popular music producer and arranger. He was one of BMI's top five songwriters/air play in its first 50 years, alongside Paul Simon, Kris Kristofferson, Jimmy Webb, and Paul McCartney. He is best known for his long association with The Platters and also wrote, produced and arranged for the Penguins, the Coasters, the Drifters, Ike and Tina Turner, Ike Cole, Duke Ellington, Glenn Miller, Ella Fitzgerald, and many others. He was also known as Ande Rand, Lynn Paul or Jean Miles.

== Biography ==
He was born Samuel Ram in Chicago, Illinois in 1907, to Jewish parents. Ram was a talent manager with his own firm, Personality Productions, and an A&R man when Tony Williams, the brother of singer Linda Hayes, auditioned for him. Ram was looking for a group to sing the songs he wrote and found the voice he was looking for in Williams. He transformed the Platters and changed their rhythm and blues style, building around Williams' voice to make them sound like the Mills Brothers and the Ink Spots. With talented orchestrators like Red Callender, Hal Mooney, Sammy Lowe and David Carroll, Ram produced all recordings by The Platters, from their signing with Mercury Records until his death, and wrote their biggest hits including "Only You (And You Alone)", "The Great Pretender". "(You've Got) The Magic Touch", "Twilight Time", and "Enchanted".

When Mercury announced that they would release "Only You" on their purple "race music" label, Ram insisted that the records be relabeled, stating that The Platters had worked too hard to have their (and his) market limited by a record label. Mercury agreed, and the records were re-labeled, thereby breaking down racial barriers and laying the groundwork for the black groups of the 1960s and beyond.

Ram wrote the lyrics to "The Great Pretender" in the washroom of the Flamingo Hotel in Las Vegas after being asked what The Platters follow-up to "Only You" would be. In 1987, when the song hit #4 in the UK for Freddie Mercury, Ram had no idea who Mercury was but was thrilled his song was on the charts again—32 years after its 1955 premiere by The Platters. Ram also wrote "(You've Got) The Magic Touch", the lyrics for "Come Prima (For the First Time)" "Twilight Time", "Chew Chew Chew Your Bubble Gum" (with Ella Fitzgerald), "Remember When", and "Ring Telephone Ring" among others.

Controversy has surrounded "I'll Be Home for Christmas", since it was first published. The label on Bing Crosby's recording of "I'll Be Home for Christmas" credits it to Kent, Gannon, and Ram. Later recordings usually credit only Kent and Gannon. The discrepancy arose from the fact that on December 21, 1942, Buck Ram copyrighted a song titled "I'll Be Home for Christmas (Tho' Just in Memory)" although that version bore little or no resemblance, other than its title, to the Crosby recording. A song titled "I'll Be Home for Christmas" was also copyrighted on August 24, 1943, by Walter Kent (music) and James "Kim" Gannon (words). Kent and Gannon revised and re-copyrighted their song on September 27, 1943, and it was this version that Bing Crosby made famous.

Ram was a songwriter first and manager/producer second. The Platters and other groups he managed, like the Flares, were his vehicle to getting his songs recorded. In many cases he put singers' names on songs he had written. The only other controversy in Ram's long songwriting career was with "Twilight Time" which had been an instrumental recorded by the Three Suns. When Ram wrote the lyrics to the song and made it a hit, the Three Suns sued. As in the Christmas standard, the court ruled that the names of Artie Dunn and the Nevin brothers, writers of the instrumental, be included. It did not find against Ram. However, as a manager, he was involved in later litigation over former Platters performers when they sought to use the name when performing.

Ram and his wife, Lucille, had two children. He died at Valley Hospital Medical Center in Las Vegas on January 1, 1991, at the age of 83.
