= Al Jolson =

Lithuanian-American entertainer (1886–1950)

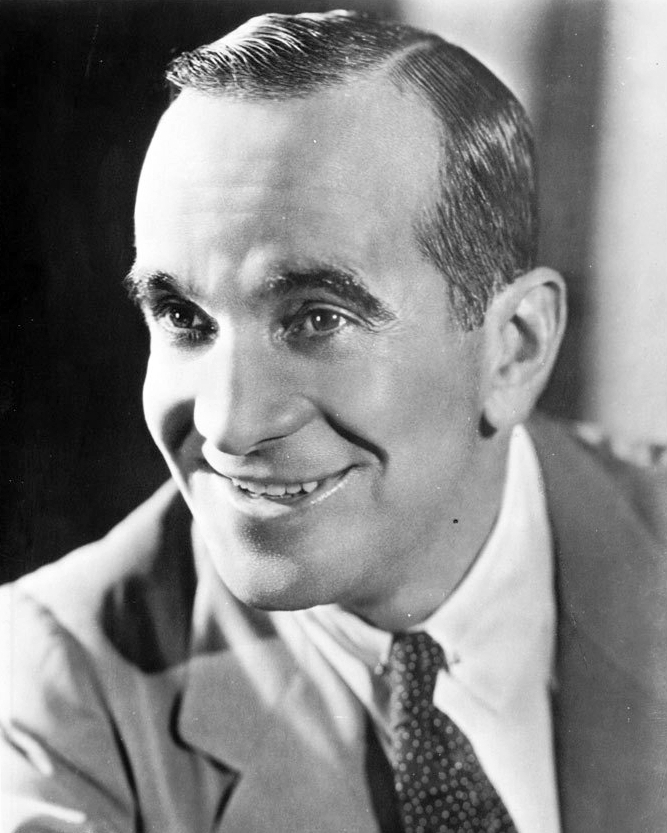
- Jolson in 1925
- Born: Asa Yoelson; May 26, 1886; Sredniki, Russian Empire
- Died: October 23, 1950 (aged 64); San Francisco, California, U.S.
- Resting place: Hillside Memorial Park Cemetery
- Occupations: Singer; comedian; actor; vaudevillian
- Years active: 1897–1950
- Spouses: Henrietta Keller (m. 1907; div. 1919) Alma Osbourne (m. 1922; div. 1928) Ruby Keeler (m. 1928; div. 1940) Erle Galbraith (m. 1945)
- Children: 3 (all adopted)
- Musical career
- Genres: Jazz; blues; ragtime; pop
- Labels: Victor; Columbia; Little Wonder; Brunswick; Decca
- Website: jolson.org

Al Jolson (born Asa Yoelson; c. 26 May [N.S. 7 June] 1886 – October 23, 1950) was a Lithuanian-American singer, comedian, actor and vaudevillian.

Self-billed as "The World's Greatest Entertainer", Jolson was one of the United States' most famous and highest-paid stars of the 1910s and 1920s. He was known for his "shamelessly sentimental, melodramatic approach" towards performing, along with popularizing many of the songs he sang. According to music historian Larry Stempel, "No one had heard anything quite like it before on Broadway." Stephen Banfield wrote that Jolson's style was "arguably the single most important factor in defining the modern musical." Jolson has been referred to by modern critics as "the king of blackface performers".

Although best remembered today as the star of the first major talking picture, The Jazz Singer (1927), he starred in a series of successful musical films during the 1930s. After the attack on Pearl Harbor in December 1941, he was the first star to entertain troops overseas during World War II. After a period of inactivity, his stardom returned with The Jolson Story (1946), in which Larry Parks played the younger Jolson, but with sung vocals dubbed by Jolson himself. The formula was repeated in a sequel, Jolson Sings Again (1949). In 1950, he again became the first star to entertain GIs on active service in the Korean War, performing 42 shows in 16 days. He died weeks after returning to the U.S., partly owing to the physical exhaustion from the performance schedule. Defense Secretary George Marshall posthumously awarded him the Medal for Merit.

With his dynamic style of singing, he became widely successful by extracting traditionally black music and popularizing it for White American audiences. Despite his promotion and perpetuation of Black stereotypes of the time, his work was often well regarded by Black publications, and he has been credited for fighting against Black discrimination on Broadway as early as 1911. In an essay written in 2000, music critic Ted Gioia remarked, "If blackface has its shameful poster boy, it is Al Jolson", showcasing Jolson's complex legacy in American society.

== Early life ==
Asa Yoelson was born in the village of Srednike (Yiddish: סרעדניק), now known as Seredžius, near Kaunas in Lithuania, then part of the Russian Empire. He was the fifth and youngest child of Nechama "Naomi" (née Cantor, c. 1858–1895) and Moses Rubin Yoelson (c. 1858–1945); his four siblings were Rose (c. 1879–1939), Etta (c. 1880–1948), another sister who died in infancy, and Hirsch (Harry) (c. 1882–1953). Jolson did not know his date of birth, as birth records were not kept at that time in that region, and he gave his birth year as 1885.

In 1891, his father, who was qualified as a rabbi and cantor, moved to New York City to secure a better future for his family. By 1894, Moses Yoelson could afford to pay the fare to bring Nechama and their four children to the U.S. By the time they arrived—as steerage passengers on the RMS Umbria arriving at the Port of New York on April 9, 1894—he had found work as a cantor at Talmud Torah Congregation in the Southwest Waterfront neighborhood of Washington, D.C., where the family was reunited.

Jolson's mother, Naomi, died at 37 in early 1895, and he was in a state of withdrawal for seven months. He spent time at the St. Mary's Industrial School for Boys, a progressive reformatory/home for orphans run by the Xaverian Brothers in Baltimore. After being introduced to show business in 1895 by Al Reeves, Asa and Hirsch became fascinated by it, and by 1897 the brothers were singing for coins on local street corners, using the names "Al" and "Harry". They often used the money to buy tickets to the National Theatre. They spent most of their days working different jobs as a team.

== Stage performer ==
In the spring of 1902, Jolson accepted a job with Walter L. Main's circus. Although Main had hired him as an usher, Main was impressed by Jolson's singing voice and gave him a position as a singer during the circus's Indian Medicine Side Show segment. By the end of the year, the circus had folded and Jolson was again out of work. In May 1903, the head producer of the burlesque show Dainty Duchess Burlesquers agreed to give Jolson a part in one show. He performed "Be My Baby Bumble Bee", and the producer agreed to keep him, but the show closed by the end of the year. He avoided financial troubles by forming a vaudeville partnership with his brother Hirsch, a vaudeville performer known as Harry Yoelson. The brothers worked for the William Morris Agency. Jolson and Harry formed a team with Joe Palmer. During their time with Palmer, they were able to gain bookings in a nationwide tour. However, live performances were falling in popularity as nickelodeons attracted audiences; by 1908, nickelodeon theaters were dominant throughout New York City. While performing in a Brooklyn theater in 1904, Jolson began performing in blackface, which boosted his career. He began wearing blackface in all of his shows.

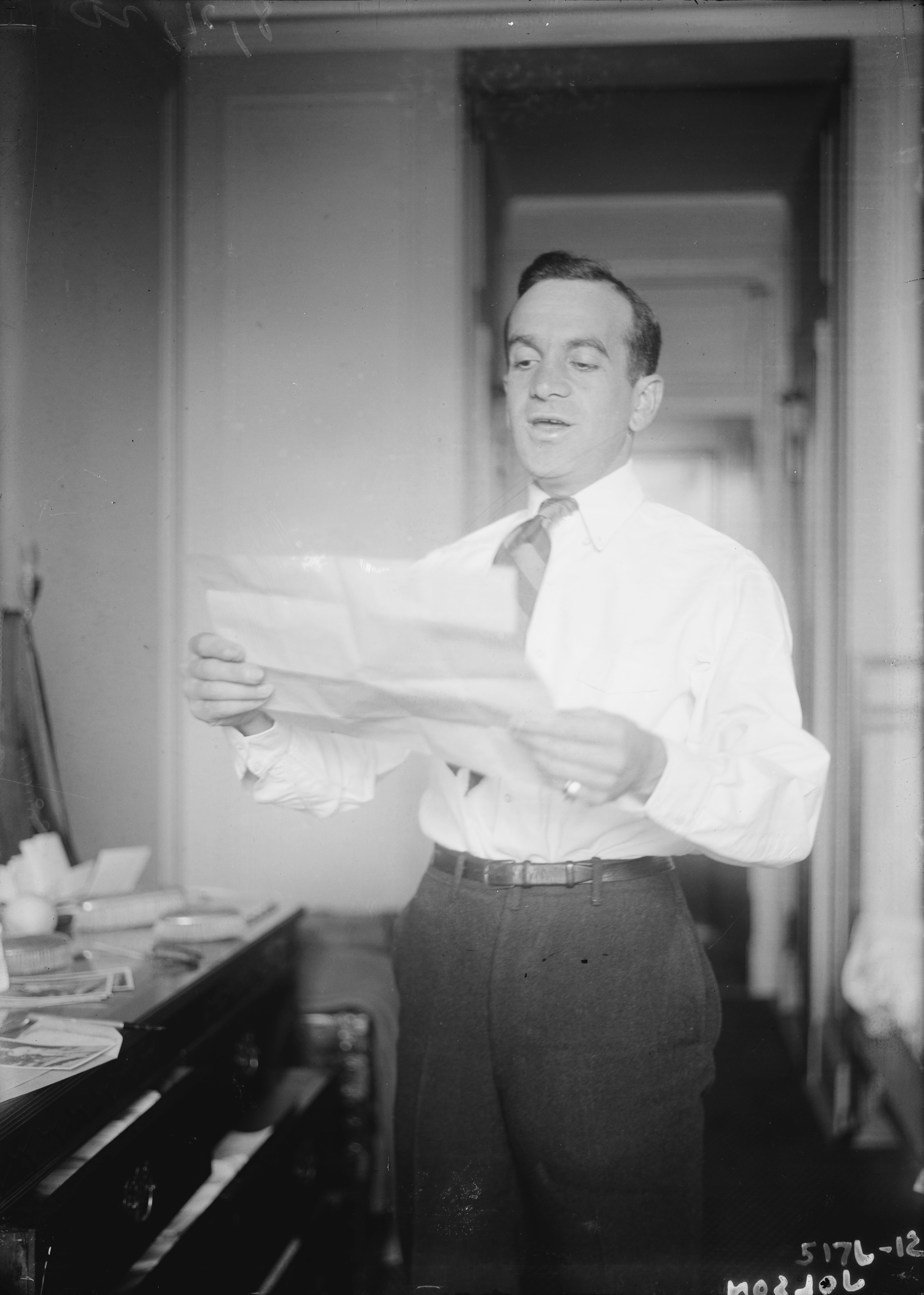
Al Jolson (1920s)

In late 1905, Harry left the trio after an argument with Jolson. Harry had refused his request to take care of Joe Palmer, who was in a wheelchair. After Harry's departure, Jolson and Palmer worked as a duo but were not particularly successful. By 1906 they agreed to separate, and Jolson was on his own. He became a regular at the Globe and Wigwam Theater in San Francisco and was successful nationwide as a vaudeville singer. He took up residence in San Francisco, saying the earthquake-devastated people needed someone to cheer them up. In 1908, Jolson, needing money for himself and his new wife, Henrietta, returned to New York. In 1909, his singing caught the attention of Lew Dockstader, the producer and star of Dockstader's Minstrels. Jolson accepted Dockstader's offer and became a blackface performer.

According to Esquire magazine, "J.J. Shubert, impressed by Jolson's overpowering display of energy, booked him for La Belle Paree, a musical comedy that opened at the Winter Garden in 1911. Within a month Jolson was a star. From then until 1926, when he retired from the stage, he could boast an unbroken series of smash hits."

On March 20, 1911, Jolson starred in his first musical revue at the Winter Garden Theater in New York City. La Belle Paree helped start his career as a singer. Opening night drew a large crowd, and he became popular with the audience by performing Stephen Foster songs in blackface. The show closed after 104 performances. After La Belle Paree, he accepted an offer to perform in the musical Vera Violetta which opened on November 20, 1911, and like La Belle Paree it was a success. In the show, he again sang in blackface and became so popular that his weekly salary of $500 (based on his success in La Belle Paree) was increased to $750.

Swanee
Al Jolson's hit 1920 recording of George Gershwin and Irving Caesar's 1919 "Swanee"

After Vera Violetta closed, Jolson starred in another musical, The Whirl of Society, propelling his career on Broadway to new heights. During his time at the Winter Garden, Jolson told the audience, "You ain't heard nothing yet" before performing additional songs. In the play, he debuted his signature blackface character "Gus". Winter Garden owner Lee Shubert signed Jolson to a seven-year contract with a salary of $1,000 a week. Jolson reprised his role as "Gus" in future plays and by 1914 achieved so much popularity with theater audiences that his $1,000-a-week salary was doubled. In 1916, Robinson Crusoe Jr. was the first musical in which he was the star. In 1918, his acting career was pushed further after he starred in the hit musical Sinbad. It became the most successful Broadway musical of 1918 and 1919. "Swanee" was added to the show and became composer George Gershwin's first hit recording. Jolson added "My Mammy". By 1920, he had become the biggest star on Broadway.

His next play, Bombo, became so successful that it went beyond Broadway to performances nationwide. It led Lee Shubert to rename his theater Jolson's 59th Street Theatre. At the age of 35, Jolson was the youngest man in American history to have a theatre named after him. But on the opening night of Bombo, the first performance at the new theatre, he suffered from stage fright, walking up and down the streets for hours before showtime. Out of fear, he lost his voice backstage and begged the stagehands not to raise the curtains. But when the curtains went up, he "was [still] standing in the wings trembling and sweating". After being shoved onto the stage by his brother Harry, he performed, then received a significant ovation: "For several minutes, the applause continued while Al stood and bowed after the first act." He refused to go back on stage for the second act, but the audience "stamped its feet and chanted 'Jolson, Jolson', until he came back out". He took 37 curtain calls that night and told the audience, "I'm a happy man tonight." Bombo introduced "California Here I Come", which became one of Jolson's signature songs and for which he received a co-writer's credit.

In March 1922, he moved the production to the larger Century Theater for a benefit performance to aid injured Jewish veterans of World War I. After taking the show on the road for a season, he returned in May 1923, to perform Bombo at the Winter Garden. The reviewer for The New York Times wrote, "He returned like the circus, bigger and brighter and newer than ever.... Last night's audience was flatteringly unwilling to go home, and when the show proper was over, Jolson reappeared before the curtain and sang more songs, old and new."

"I don't mind going on record as saying that he is one of the few instinctively funny men on our stage", wrote reviewer Charles Darnton in the New York Evening World. "Everything he touches turns to fun. To watch him is to marvel at his humorous vitality. He is the old-time minstrel man turned to modern account. With a song, a word, or even a suggestion he calls forth spontaneous laughter. And here you have the definition of a born comedian."

== Films ==
=== The Jazz Singer ===
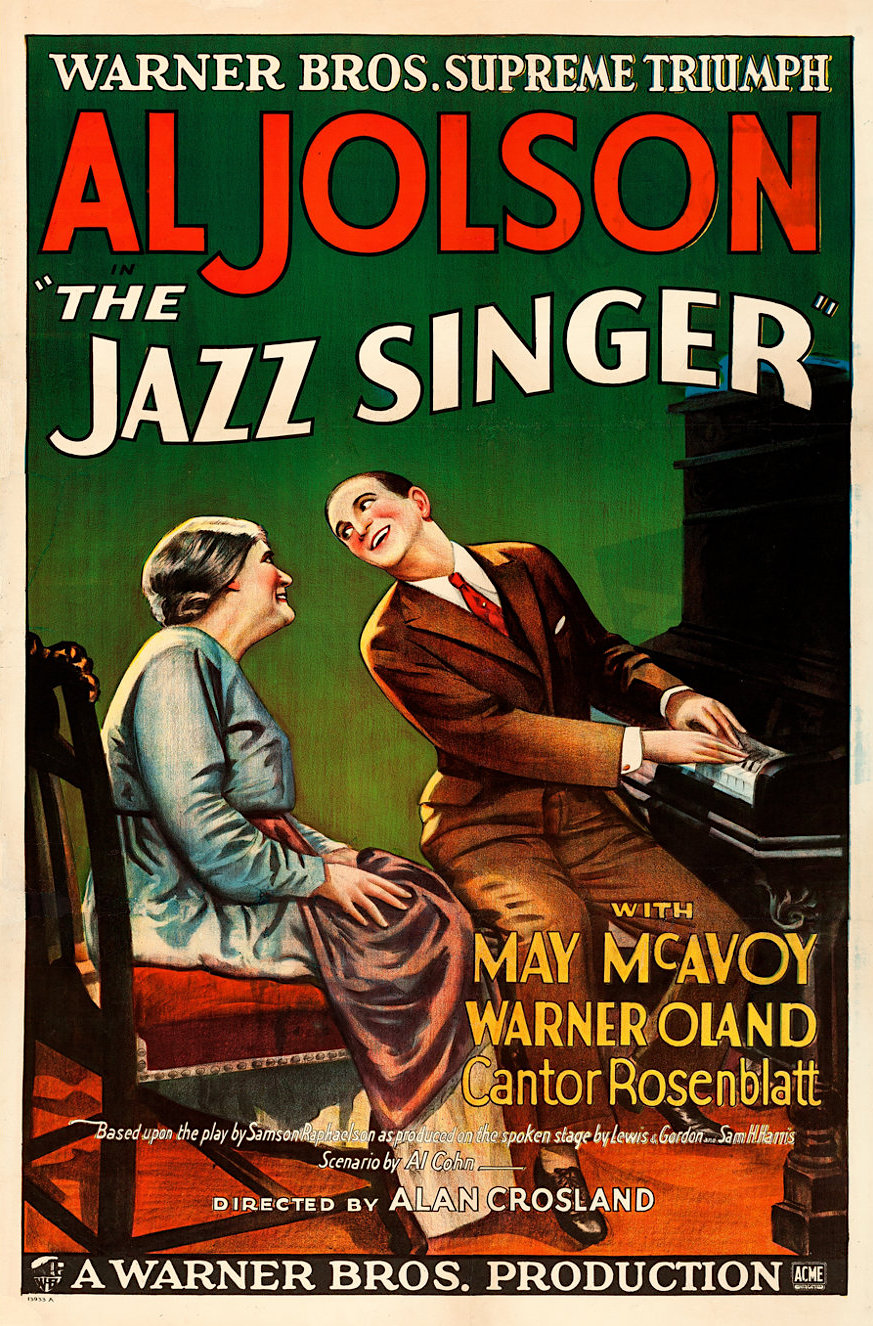
Poster for The Jazz Singer, 1927

The Jazz Singer (1927)

Before The Jazz Singer, Jolson starred in the talking live-action short A Plantation Act. This simulation of a stage performance by Jolson was presented in a program of musical shorts, demonstrating the Vitaphone sound-film process. The soundtrack for A Plantation Act was considered lost in 1933, but was found in 1995 and restored by The Vitaphone Project.

Warner Bros. picked George Jessel for the role, as he had starred in the Broadway play. When Sam Warner decided to make The Jazz Singer a musical with the Vitaphone, he knew that Jolson was the star he needed. He told Jessel that he would have to sing in the movie, and Jessel balked, allowing Warner to replace him with Jolson. Jessel never got over it, and often said that Warner gave the role to Jolson because he agreed to help finance the film.

Harry Warner's daughter, Doris, remembered the opening night, and said that when the picture started she was still crying over the loss of her beloved uncle Sam. He had been planning to be at the performance but died suddenly, at the age of 40, on the previous day. However, halfway through the 89-minute film, she began to be overtaken by a sense that something remarkable was happening. Jolson's "Wait a minute" line provoked shouts of pleasure and applause from the audience, who were dumbfounded by seeing and hearing someone speak on a film for the first time, so much so that the double-entendre was missed at first. After each Jolson song, the audience applauded. Excitement mounted as the film progressed, and when Jolson began his scene with Eugenie Besserer, "the audience became hysterical".

According to film historian Scott Eyman, "by the film's end, the Warner brothers had shown an audience something they had never known, moved them in a way they hadn't expected. The tumultuous ovation at curtain proved that Jolson was not merely the right man for the part of Jackie Rabinowitz, alias Jack Robin; he was the right man for the entire transition from silent fantasy to talking realism. The audience, transformed into what one critic called, 'a milling, battling mob' stood, stamped, and cheered 'Jolson, Jolson, Jolson!'"

Vitaphone was intended for musical renditions, and The Jazz Singer follows this principle, with only the musical sequences using live sound recording. The moviegoers were electrified when the silent actions were interrupted periodically for a song sequence with real singing and sound. Jolson's dynamic voice, physical mannerisms, and charisma held the audience spellbound. Costar May McAvoy, according to author A. Scott Berg, could not help sneaking into theaters day after day as the film was being run. "She pinned herself against a wall in the dark and watched the faces in the crowd. In that moment just before 'Toot, Toot, Tootsie,' she remembered, 'A miracle occurred. Moving pictures really came alive. To see the expressions on their faces, when Joley spoke to them ... you'd have thought they were listening to the voice of God.'" "Everybody was mad for the talkies", said movie star Gregory Peck in a Newsweek interview. "I remember The Jazz Singer, when Al Jolson just burst into song, and there was a little bit of dialogue. And when he came out with 'Mammy,' and went down on his knees to his Mammy, it was just dynamite."

This opinion is shared by Mast and Kawin:

this moment of informal patter at the piano is the most exciting and vital part of the entire movie ... when Jolson acquires a voice, the warmth, the excitement, the vibrations of it, the way its rambling spontaneity lays bare the imagination of the mind that is making up the sounds ... [and] the addition of a Vitaphone voice revealed the particular qualities of Al Jolson that made him a star. Not only the eyes are a window on the soul.

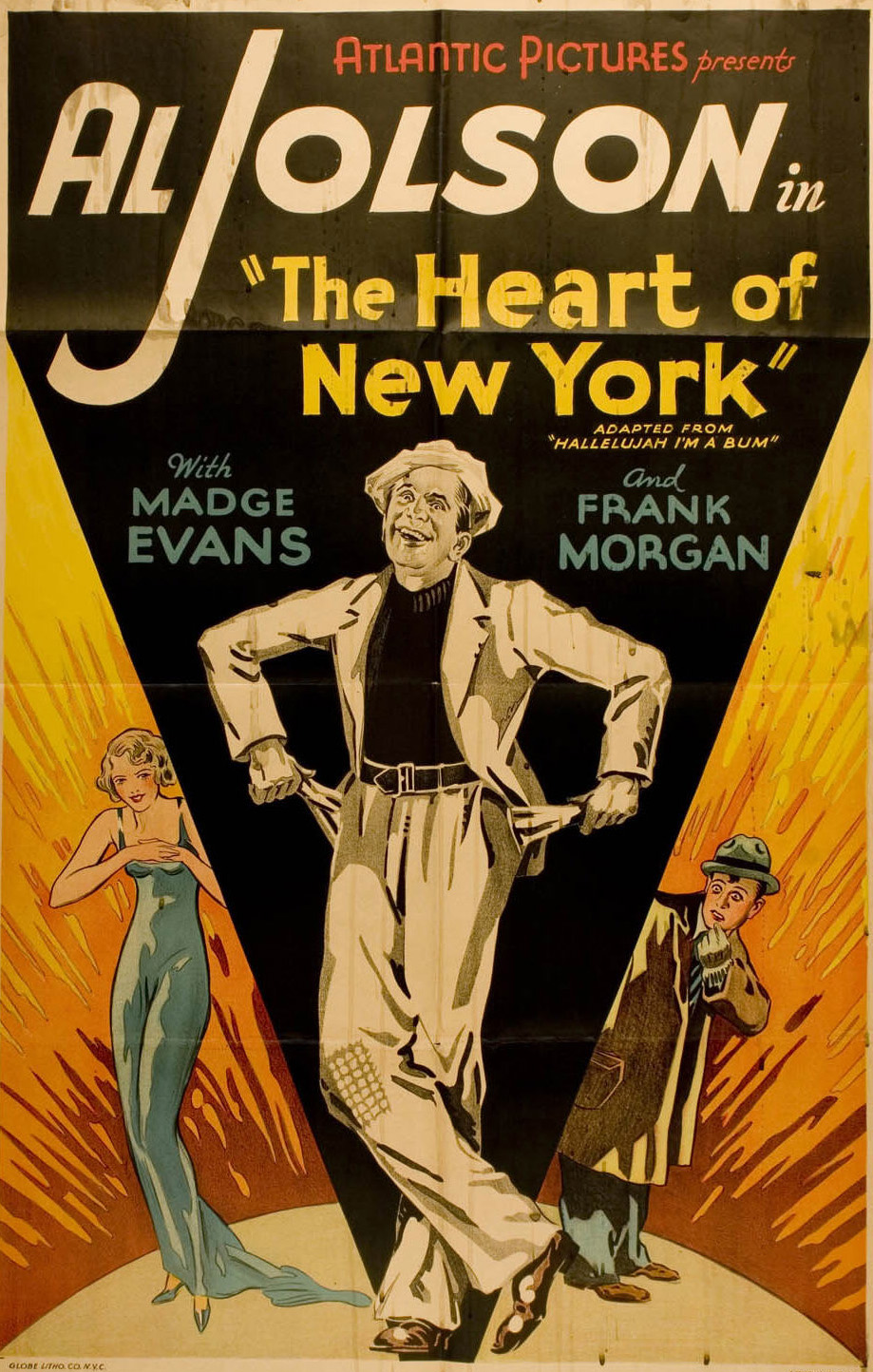
Poster for Hallelujah, I'm a Bum with reissue title

=== The Singing Fool ===
With Warner Bros. Al Jolson made his first "all-talking" picture, The Singing Fool (1928), the story of an ambitious entertainer who insisted on going on with the show even as his small son lay dying. The film was even more popular than The Jazz Singer. "Sonny Boy", from the film, was the first American record to sell one million copies.

Jolson continued to make features for Warner Bros. similar in style to The Singing Fool. These included Say It with Songs (1929), Mammy (1930), and Big Boy (1930). A restored version of Mammy, with Jolson in Technicolor sequences, was first screened in 2002. Jolson's first Technicolor appearance was a cameo in the musical Showgirl in Hollywood (1930) from First National Pictures, a Warner Bros. subsidiary. However, these films gradually proved a cycle of diminishing returns due to their comparative sameness, the regal salary that Jolson demanded, and a shift in public taste away from vaudeville musicals as the 1930s began. Jolson returned to Broadway and starred in the unsuccessful Wonder Bar.

=== Hallelujah, I'm a Bum/Hallelujah, I'm a Tramp ===
Warner Bros. allowed him to make Hallelujah, I'm a Bum with United Artists in 1933. It was directed by Lewis Milestone and written by Ben Hecht. Hecht was also active in the promotion of civil rights: "Hecht film stories featuring black characters included Hallelujah, I'm a Bum, co-starring Edgar Connor as Jolson's sidekick, in a politically savvy rhymed dialogue over Richard Rodgers music."

Mordaunt Hall of The New York Times wrote, "The picture, some persons may be glad to hear, has no Mammy song. It is Mr. Jolson's best film and well it might be, for that clever director, Lewis Milestone, guided its destiny ... a combination of fun, melody and romance, with a dash of satire...." The film resurfaced in 1973, as The New Yorker noted: "A film to welcome back, especially for what it tries to do for the progress of the American musical...."

=== Wonder Bar ===
In 1934, Jolson starred in Wonder Bar, co-starring Kay Francis, Dolores del Río, Ricardo Cortez, and Dick Powell. It's a movie version of his earlier stage play, a "musical Grand Hotel, set in the Parisian nightclub owned by Al Wonder (Jolson). Wonder entertains and banters with his international clientele." Reviews were generally positive: "Wonder Bar has got about everything. Romance, flash, dash, class, color, songs, star-studded talent and almost every known requisite to assure sturdy attention and attendance.... It's Jolson's comeback picture in every respect."; and, "Those who like Jolson should see Wonder Bar for it is mainly Jolson; singing the old reliables; cracking jokes which would have impressed Noah as depressingly ancient; and moving about with characteristic energy."

=== The Singing Kid ===
Jolson's last Warner vehicle was The Singing Kid (1936). The film parodies Jolson's stage persona (he plays a character named Al Jackson) in which he mocks his stage histrionics and taste for "mammy" songs — the latter via a number by E. Y. Harburg and Harold Arlen titled "I Love to Singa", and a comedy sequence with Jolson doggedly trying to sing "Mammy" while The Yacht Club Boys keep telling him such songs are outdated.

According to jazz historian Michael Alexander, Jolson had once griped that "People have been making fun of mammy songs, and I don't really think that it's right that they should, for after all, mammy songs are the fundamental songs of our country." (He said this, in character, in his 1926 short A Plantation Act.) In this film, he notes, "Jolson had the confidence to rhyme 'Mammy' with 'Uncle Sammy'", adding "Mammy songs, along with the vocation 'Mammy singer', were inventions of the Jewish Jazz Age."

The film also gave a boost to the career of Black singer and bandleader Cab Calloway, who performed a number of songs alongside Jolson. In his autobiography, Calloway writes about this episode:

I'd heard Al Jolson was doing a new film on the Coast, and since Duke Ellington and his band had done a film, wasn't it possible for me and the band to do this one with Jolson. Frenchy got on the phone to California, spoke to someone connected with the film and the next thing I knew the band and I were booked into Chicago on our way to California for the film, The Singing Kid. We had a hell of a time, although I had some pretty rough arguments with Harold Arlen, who had written the music. Arlen was the songwriter for many of the finest Cotton Club revues, but he had done some interpretations for The Singing Kid that I just couldn't go along with. He was trying to change my style and I was fighting it. Finally, Jolson stepped in and said to Arlen, 'Look, Cab knows what he wants to do; let him do it his way.' After that, Arlen left me alone. And talk about integration: Hell, when the band and I got out to Hollywood, we were treated like pure royalty. Here were Jolson and I living in adjacent penthouses in a very plush hotel. We were costars in the film so we received equal treatment, no question about it.

"I Love to Singa", sung by both Jolson and Calloway, later appeared in Tex Avery's cartoon of the same name.

While a pleasant film, The Singing Kid demonstrates how far Jolson's star had fallen by 1936. He no longer had star billing, the film was only a minor attraction released under Warners' second-echelon "First National" trademark, and the title was a mild, backhanded swipe at Jolson, because the singing kid is really child actress Sybil Jason, making her screen debut as Jolson's small companion. Jason remembers that Busby Berkeley worked on the film although he is not credited.

Jolson remained off the screen for the next three years.

=== Rose of Washington Square ===
His next movie—his first with Twentieth Century-Fox—was Rose of Washington Square (1939). It stars Alice Faye and Tyrone Power, with Jolson billed third, and included many of Jolson's best known songs, although several songs were cut to shorten the movie's length, including "April Showers" and "Avalon". Reviewers wrote, "Mr Jolson's singing of Mammy, California, Here I Come and others is something for the memory book" and "Of the three co-stars this is Jolson's picture ... because it's a pretty good catalog in anybody's hit parade." The movie was released on DVD in October 2008. 20th Century Fox hired him to recreate a scene from The Jazz Singer in the Alice Faye-Don Ameche film Hollywood Cavalcade. Guest appearances in two more Fox films followed that same year, but his starring career came to a halt.

=== World War II ===
Japanese bombs on Pearl Harbor shook Jolson out of continuing moods of lethargy due to years of little activity and "... he dedicated himself to a new mission in life.... Even before the U.S.O. began to set up a formal program overseas, Jolson was deluging War and Navy Department brass with phone calls and wires. He requested permission to go anywhere in the world where there was an American serviceman who wouldn't mind listening to 'Sonny Boy' or 'Mammy'.... [and] early in 1942, Jolson became the first star to perform at a GI base in World War II".

From a 1942 interview in The New York Times: "When the war started ... [I] felt that it was up to me to do something, and the only thing I know is show business. I went around during the last war and I saw that the boys needed something besides chow and drills. I knew the same was true today, so I told the people in Washington that I would go anywhere and do an act for the Army." Shortly after the war began, he wrote a letter to Steven Early, press secretary to President Franklin D. Roosevelt, volunteering "to head a committee for the entertainment of soldiers and said that he "would work without pay ... [and] would gladly assist in the organization to be set up for this purpose". A few weeks later, he received his first tour schedule from the newly formed United Services Organization (USO), "the group his letter to Early had helped create".

He did as many as four shows a day in the jungle outposts of Central America and covered the string of U.S. Naval bases. He paid for part of the transportation out of his own pocket. Upon doing his first, and unannounced, show in England in 1942, the reporter for the Hartford Courant wrote, "... it was a panic. And pandemonium ... when he was done the applause that shook that soldier-packed room was like bombs falling again in Shaftsbury Avenue."

From an article in The New York Times:

He [Jolson] has been to more Army camps and played to more soldiers than any other entertainer. He has crossed the Atlantic by plane to take song and cheer to the troops in Britain and Northern Ireland. He has flown to the cold wastes of Alaska and the steaming forests of Trinidad. He has called at Dutch‑like Curaçao. Nearly every camp in this country has heard him sing and tell funny stories.

Some of the unusual hardships of performing to active troops were described in an article he wrote for Variety, in 1942:

In order to entertain all the boys ... it became necessary for us to give shows in foxholes, gun emplacements, dugouts, to construction groups on military roads; in fact, any place where two or more soldiers were gathered together, it automatically became a Winter Garden for me and I would give a show.

After returning from a tour of overseas bases, the Regimental Hostess at one camp wrote to Jolson,

Allow me to say on behalf of all the soldiers of the 33rd Infantry that you coming here is quite the most wonderful thing that has ever happened to us, and we think you're tops, not only as a performer, but as a person. We unanimously elect you Public Morale Lifter No. 1 of the U.S Army.

Jolson was officially enlisted in the United Service Organizations (USO), the organization which provided entertainment for American troops who served in combat overseas. Because he was over the age of 45, he received a "Specialist" rating that permitted him to wear a uniform and be given the standing of an officer. While touring in the Pacific, Jolson contracted malaria and had to have his left lung surgically removed. In 1946, during a nationally broadcast testimonial dinner in New York City, given on his behalf, he received a special tribute from the American Veterans Committee in honor of his volunteer services during World War II.

=== The Jolson Story ===
Original movie poster, 1946

After the George M. Cohan film biography, Yankee Doodle Dandy (1942), Hollywood columnist Sidney Skolsky believed that a similar film could be made about Al Jolson. Skolsky pitched the idea of an Al Jolson biopic and Harry Cohn, the head of Columbia Pictures agreed. It was directed by Alfred E. Green, best remembered for the pre-Code Baby Face (1933). Cohn was impressed by director Joseph H. Lewis's handling of the PRC musical Minstrel Man, and hired Lewis to stage the musical numbers for the Jolson picture. With Jolson providing almost all the vocals, and Columbia contract player Larry Parks playing Jolson, The Jolson Story (1946) became one of the biggest box-office hits of the year. In a tribute to Jolson, Larry Parks wrote, "Stepping into his shoes was, for me, a matter of endless study, observation, energetic concentration to obtain, perfectly if possible, a simulation of the kind of man he was. It is not surprising, therefore, that while making The Jolson Story, I spent 107 days before the cameras and lost eighteen pounds in weight."

From a review in Variety:

But the real star of the production is that Jolson voice and that Jolson medley (curiously, even astoundingly uncredited) . It was good showmanship to cast this film with lesser people, particularly Larry Parks as the mammy kid.... As for Jolson's voice, it has never been better. Thus the magic of science has produced a composite whole to eclipse the original at his most youthful best.

Parks received an Oscar nomination for Best Actor. Although the 60-year-old Jolson was too old to play a younger version of himself in the movie, he persuaded the studio to let him appear in one musical sequence, "Swanee", shot entirely in long shot, with Jolson in blackface singing and dancing onto the runway leading into the middle of the theater. In the wake of the film's success and his World War II tours, Jolson became a top singer among the American public once more. Decca signed Jolson and he recorded for Decca from 1945 until his death, making his last commercial recordings for the company.

==== Critical observations ====
According to film historian Krin Gabbard, The Jolson Story goes further than any of the earlier films in exploring the significance of blackface and the relationships that Whites have developed with Blacks in the area of music. To him, the film seems to imply an inclination of White performers, like Jolson, who are possessed with "the joy of life and enough sensitivity to appreciate the musical accomplishments of blacks". To support his view he describes a significant part of the movie:

While wandering around New Orleans before a show with Dockstader's Minstrels, he enters a small club where a group of black jazz musicians are performing. Jolson has a revelation, that the staid repertoire of the minstrel troupe can be transformed by actually playing black music in blackface. He tells Dockstader that he wants to sing what he has just experienced: 'I heard some music tonight, something they call jazz. Some fellows just make it up as they go along. They pick it up out of the air.' After Dockstader refuses to accommodate Jolson's revolutionary concept, the narrative chronicles his climb to stardom as he allegedly injects jazz into his blackface performances.... Jolson's success is built on anticipating what Americans really want. Dockstader performs the inevitable function of the guardian of the status quo, whose hidebound commitment to what is about to become obsolete reinforces the audience's sympathy with the forward-looking hero.

This has been a theme which was traditionally "dear to the hearts of the men who made the movies". Film historian George Custen describes this "common scenario, in which the hero is vindicated for innovations that are initially greeted with resistance.... [T]he struggle of the heroic protagonist who anticipates changes in cultural attitudes is central to other White jazz biopics such as The Glenn Miller Story (1954) and The Benny Goodman Story (1955)". "Once we accept a semantic change from singing to playing the clarinet, The Benny Goodman Story becomes an almost transparent reworking of The Jazz Singer ... and The Jolson Story."

==== Jolson Sings Again (1949) ====
A sequel, Jolson Sings Again (1949), opened at Loew's State Theatre in New York and received positive reviews: "Mr. Jolson's name is up in lights again and Broadway is wreathed in smiles", wrote Thomas Pryor in The New York Times. "That's as it should be, for Jolson Sings Again is an occasion which warrants some lusty cheering." Jolson did a whirlwind tour of New York film theaters to promote the movie, traveling with a police convoy to make timetables for all showings, often ad libbing jokes and performing three songs for each audience. Extra police were on duty as crowds jammed the streets and sidewalks at each theater Jolson visited. In Chicago, a few weeks later, he sang to 100,000 people at Soldier Field, and later that night appeared at the Oriental Theatre with George Jessel where 10,000 people had to be turned away.

== Radio ==
Jolson had been a popular guest star on radio since its earliest days, including on NBC's The Dodge Victory Hour (January 1928), singing from a New Orleans hotel to an audience of 35 million via 47 radio stations. His own 1930s shows included Presenting Al Jolson (1932) and Shell Chateau (1935). In 1936 he starred opposite his wife Ruby Keeler in a radio play adaptation of George Manker Watters and Arthur Hopkins's hit play Burlesque on the Lux Radio Theatre.

Jolson was the co-host of the Kraft Music Hall from 1947 to 1949, with Oscar Levant as a sardonic, piano-playing sidekick. His 1940s career revival was nothing short of a success despite the competition of younger performers such as Bing Crosby and an even younger Frank Sinatra, and he was voted the "Most Popular Male Vocalist" in 1948 by a poll in Variety. The next year, Jolson was named "Personality of the Year" by the Variety Clubs of America. When Jolson appeared on Bing Crosby's radio show, he attributed his receiving the award to his being the only singer of any importance not to make a record of "Mule Train", which had been a widely covered hit of that year (four different versions, one of them by Crosby, had made the top ten on the charts). Jolson joked about how his voice had deepened with age, saying "I got the clippetys all right, but I can't clop like I used to."

In addition to his contribution to motion pictures as a performer, he is responsible for the discovery of two major stars of the golden age of Hollywood. He purchased the rights to a play he saw on Broadway and then sold the movie rights to Jack Warner (Warner Brothers which was the studio that had made The Jazz Singer) with the stipulation that two of the original cast members reprise their roles in the movie. The play became the movie Penny Arcade, and the actors were Joan Blondell and James Cagney, who both went on to become contract players for the studio. The two were major ingredients in gangster movies, which were lucrative for the studio.

=== Korean War ===
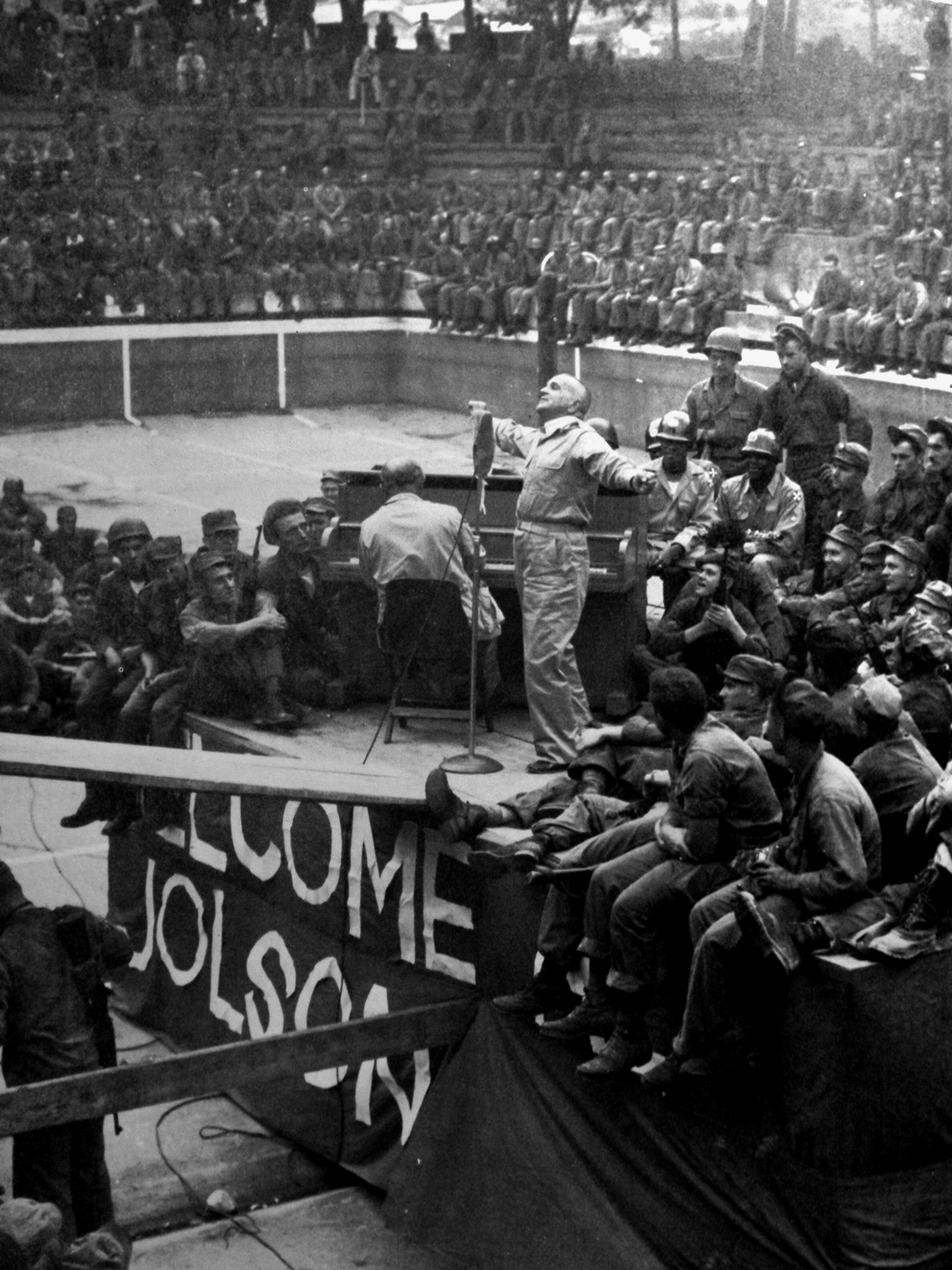
Jolson performing in Korea

In 1950, according to Jolson's biographer Michael Freedland, "the United States answered the call of the United Nations Security Council ... and had gone to fight the North Koreans.... [Jolson] rang the White House again. 'I'm gonna go to Korea,' he told a startled official on the phone. 'No one seems to know anything about the USO, and it's up to President Truman to get me there.' He was promised that President Truman and General MacArthur, who had taken command of the Korean front, would get to hear of his offer. But for four weeks there was nothing.... Finally, Louis A. Johnson, Secretary of Defense, sent Jolson a telegram. 'Sorry for delay but regret no funds for entertainment – STOP; USO disbanded – STOP.' The message was as much an assault on the Jolson sense of patriotism as the actual crossing of the 38th Parallel had been. 'What are they talkin' about', he thundered. 'Funds? Who needs funds? I got funds! I'll pay myself!'"

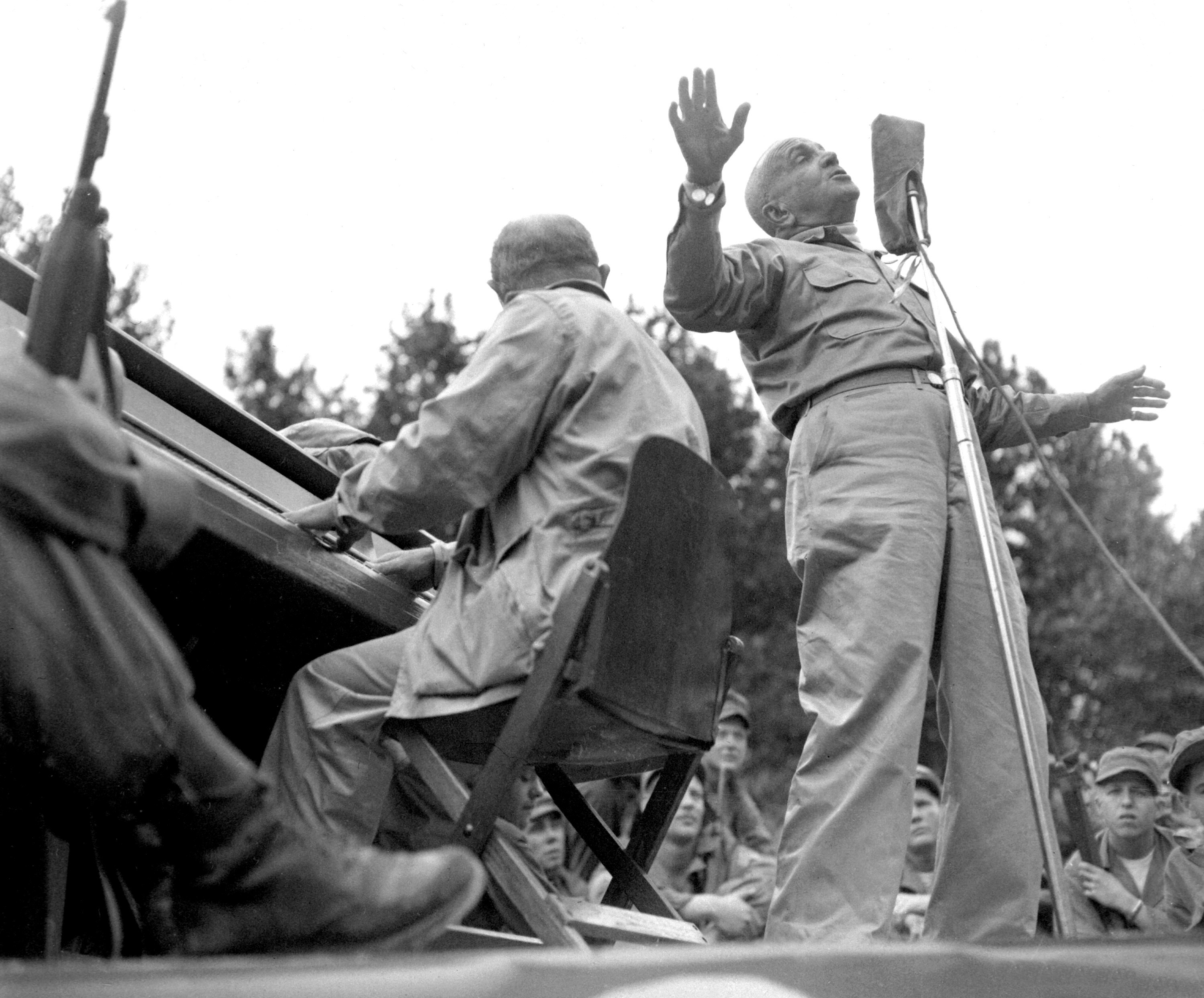
Al Jolson entertains US troops at Pusan Stadium

On September 17, 1950, a dispatch from 8th Army Headquarters, Korea, announced, "Al Jolson, the first top-flight entertainer to reach the war-front, landed here today by plane from Los Angeles...." Jolson traveled to Korea at his own expense. "[A]nd a lean, smiling Jolson drove himself without letup through 42 shows in 16 days." Alistair Cooke wrote, "The troops yelled for his appearance. He went down on his knee again and sang 'Mammy', and the troops wept and cheered. When he was asked what Korea was like he warmly answered, 'I am going to get back my income tax returns and see if I paid enough.'" Before returning to the U.S., General Douglas MacArthur, leader of UN forces, gave him a medallion inscribed "To Al Jolson from Special Services in appreciation of entertainment of armed forces personnel ‑ Far East Command", with his entire itinerary inscribed on the reverse side. A few months later, an important bridge, named the "Al Jolson Bridge", was used to withdraw the bulk of American troops from North Korea. The bridge was the last remaining of three bridges across the Han River and was used to evacuate UN forces. It was demolished by UN forces after the army made it safely across in order to prevent the Chinese from crossing. Jack Benny, who went to Korea the following year, noted that an amphitheater in Korea where troops were entertained, was named the "Al Jolson Bowl".

== Plans for movies and television ==
When Jolson appeared on Steve Allen's KNX Los Angeles radio show in 1949 to promote Jolson Sings Again, he offered his curt opinion of the burgeoning television industry: "I call it smell-evision. Some of it, anyway". Writer Hal Kanter recalled that Jolson's own idea of his television debut would be a corporate-sponsored, extra-length spectacular that would feature him as the only performer, and would be telecast without interruption. Even though he had several TV offers at the time, Jolson was apprehensive about how his larger-than-life performances would come across in a medium as intimate as television. He finally relented in 1950, when it was announced that Jolson had signed an agreement to appear on the CBS television network, presumably in a series of specials.

Ten days after returning from Korea, he signed with RKO Radio Pictures producers Jerry Wald and Norman Krasna to star in Stars and Stripes Forever, a movie about a USO troupe in the South Pacific during World War II. The screenplay was to be written by Herbert Baker and to co-star Dinah Shore.

== Death ==
Jolson's ambitious plans went unfulfilled. He had overexerted himself in Korea, especially for a man who was missing a lung. Two weeks after signing the movie contract, while playing cards in his suite at the St. Francis Hotel at 335 Powell Street in San Francisco, Jolson died of a massive heart attack on October 23, 1950. His last words were said to be "Oh ... oh, I'm going." He was 64.

After his wife received the news of his death by phone, she went into shock, and required family members to stay with her. At the funeral, police estimated that upwards of 20,000 people showed up, despite the threat of rain. It became one of the biggest funerals in show business history.

Defense Secretary George Marshall presenting the Medal for Merit to Jolson's family after his death

Celebrities paid tribute: Bob Hope, speaking from Korea via shortwave radio, said the world had lost "not only a great entertainer, but also a great citizen". Larry Parks said that the world had "lost not only its greatest entertainer, but a great American as well. He was a casualty of the [Korean] war." Scripps-Howard newspapers drew a pair of white gloves on a black background. The caption read, "The Song Is Ended."

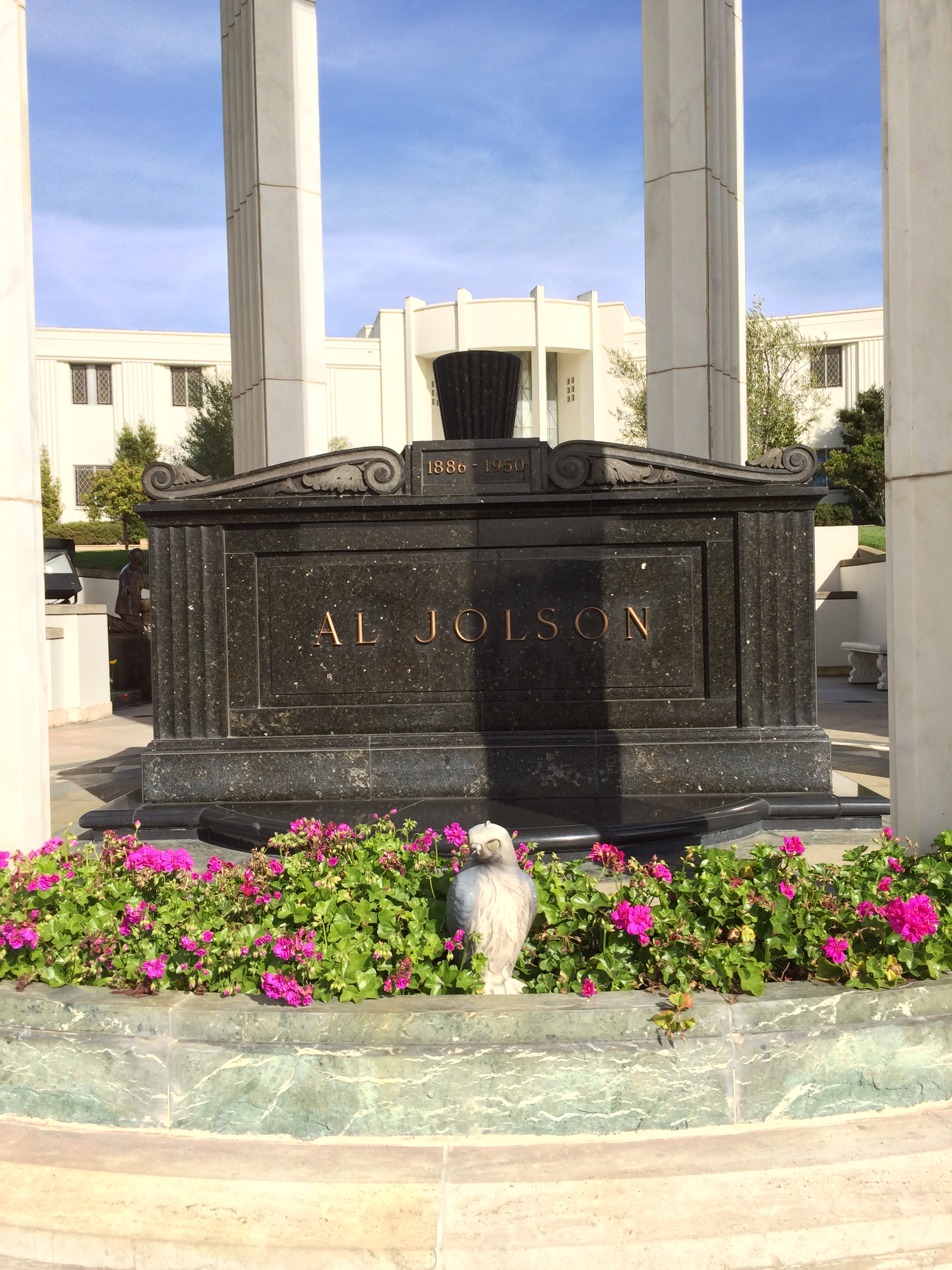
Tomb of Al Jolson at Hillside Memorial Park Cemetery

Newspaper columnist and radio reporter Walter Winchell said:

He was the first to entertain troops in World War II, contracted malaria and lost a lung. Then in his upper sixties he was again the first to offer his singing gifts for bringing solace to the wounded and weary in Korea. Today we know the exertion of his journey to Korea took a greater toll of his strength than perhaps even he realized. But he considered it his duty as an American to be there, and that was all that mattered to him. Jolson died in a San Francisco hotel. Yet he was as much a battle casualty as any American soldier who has fallen on the rocky slopes of Korea.... A star for more than 40 years, he earned his most glorious star rating at the end—a gold star.

Friend George Jessel said during part of his eulogy:

The history of the world does not say enough about how important the song and the singer have been. But history must record the name Jolson, who in the twilight of his life sang his heart out in a foreign land, to the wounded and to the valiant. I am proud to have basked in the sunlight of his greatness, to have been part of his time.

He was interred in the Hillside Memorial Park Cemetery in Culver City, California. Jolson's widow purchased a plot at Hillside and commissioned his mausoleum to be designed by well-known Black architect Paul Williams. The six-pillar marble structure is topped by a dome, next to a three-quarter-size bronze statue of Jolson, eternally resting on one knee, arms outstretched, apparently ready to break into another verse of "Mammy". The inside of the dome features a huge mosaic of Moses holding the tablets containing the Ten Commandments, and identifies Jolson as "The Sweet Singer of Israel" and "The Man Raised Up High".

On the day he died, Broadway dimmed its lights in Jolson's honor, and radio stations all over the world paid tributes. Soon after his death, the BBC presented a special program entitled Jolson Sings On. His death unleashed tributes from all over the world, including a number of eulogies from friends, including George Jessel, Walter Winchell, and Eddie Cantor. He contributed millions to Jewish and other charities in his will.

== Personal life ==
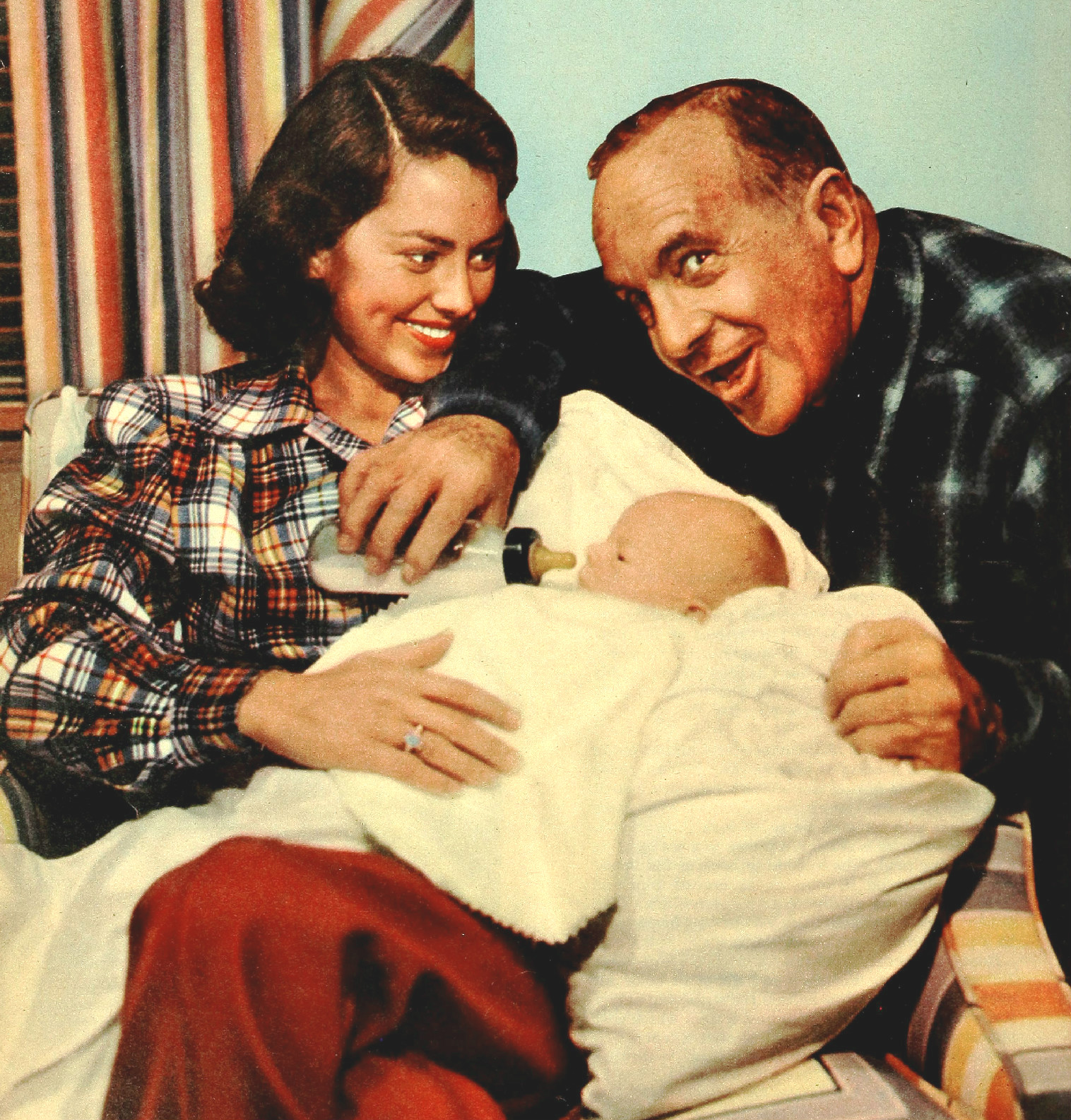
Al Jolson and family (1948)

Despite their close relationship while growing up, Harry Jolson (Al's older brother) did show some disdain for Jolson's success over the years. Even during their time with Jack Palmer, Jolson was rising in popularity while Harry was fading. After separating from "Al and Jack", Harry's career in show business sank. On one occasion Harry offered to be Jolson's agent, but Jolson rejected the offer, worried about the pressure he would face from his producers for hiring his brother. Shortly after Harry's wife Lillian died in 1948, the brothers became close once again.

Jolson's first marriage, to Henrietta Keller (1889–1967), took place in Alameda, California, on September 20, 1907. His name was given as Albert Jolson. The couple divorced in 1919. In 1920, he began a relationship with Broadway actress Alma Osbourne (known professionally as Ethel Delmar); the two were married in August 1922; she divorced Jolson in 1928.

In the summer of 1928, Jolson met young tap dancer, and later actress, Ruby Keeler in Los Angeles (Jolson would claim it was at Texas Guinan's night club) and was dazzled by her on sight. Three weeks later, Jolson saw a production of George M. Cohan's Rise of Rosie O'Reilly, and noticed she was in the show's cast. Now knowing she was going about her Broadway career, Jolson attended another one of her shows, Show Girl, and rose from the audience and engaged in her duet of "Liza". After this moment, the show's producer, Florenz Ziegfeld, asked Jolson to join the cast and continue to sing duets with Keeler. Jolson accepted Ziegfeld's offer and during their tour with Ziegfeld, the two started dating and were married on September 21, 1928. In 1935, Al and Ruby adopted a son, Jolson's first child, whom they named "Al Jolson Jr." In 1939, however—despite a marriage that was considered to be more successful than his previous ones—Keeler left Jolson. After their 1940 divorce, she remarried, to John Homer Lowe, with whom she would have four children and remain married until his death in 1969.

In 1944, while giving a show at a military hospital in Hot Springs, Arkansas, Jolson met a young X-ray technologist, Erle Galbraith. He became fascinated with her and more than a year later he was able to track her down and hired her as an actress while he served as a producer at Columbia Pictures. After Jolson, whose health was still scarred from his previous battle with malaria, was hospitalized in the winter of 1945, Erle visited him and the two quickly began a relationship. They were married on March 22, 1945. During their marriage, the Jolsons adopted two children, Asa Jr. (born 1948) and Alicia (born 1949), and remained married until his death in 1950.

After a year and a half of marriage, his new wife had never seen him perform in front of an audience, and the first occasion came unplanned. As told by actor-comedian Alan King, it happened during a dinner by the New York Friars' Club at the Waldorf Astoria in 1946 to honor the career of Sophie Tucker. Jolson and his wife were in the audience with a thousand others, and George Jessel was the emcee.

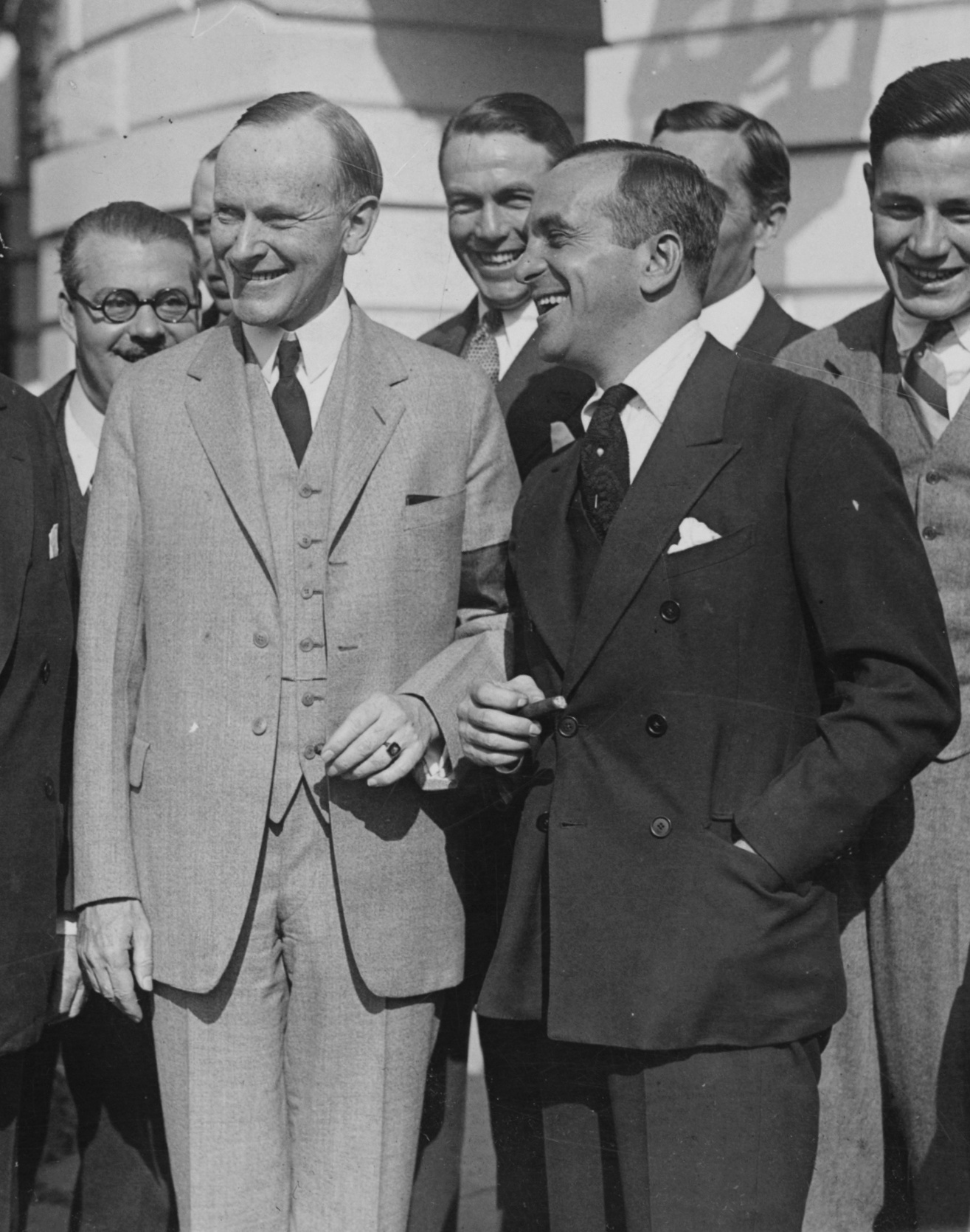
Jolson (right) in 1924 with President Calvin Coolidge, whom he supported

Without warning, during the middle of the show, Jessel said, "Ladies and gentlemen, this is the easiest introduction I ever had to make. The world's greatest entertainer, Al Jolson." King recalls what happened next:

The place is going wild. Jolson gets up, takes a bow, sits down ... people start banging with their feet, and he gets up, takes another bow, sits down again. It's chaos, and slowly, he seems to relent. He walks up onto the stage ... kids around with Sophie and gets a few laughs, but the people are yelling, 'Sing! Sing! Sing!'.... Then he says, 'I'd like to introduce you to my bride,' and this lovely young thing gets up and takes a bow. The audience doesn't care about the bride, they don't even care about Sophie Tucker. 'Sing! Sing! Sing!' they're screaming again.
'My wife has never seen me entertain', Jolson says, and looks over toward Lester Lanin, the orchestra leader: 'Maestro, is it true what they say about Dixie?'

Jolson was a Republican who supported Warren G. Harding in 1920 and Calvin Coolidge in 1924 for president. As "one of the biggest stars of his time, [he] worked his magic singing Harding, You're the Man for Us to enthralled audiences ... [and] was subsequently asked to perform Keep Cool with Coolidge four years later.... Jolson, like the men who ran the studios, was the rare showbiz Republican." Jolson publicly campaigned for Democrat Franklin Delano Roosevelt in 1932. By the next presidential election (1936), he was back to supporting Republican Alf Landon and would not support another Democrat for president during his life.

== Awards and honors ==
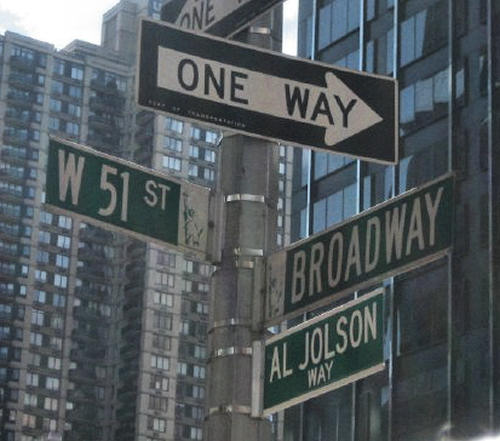
Al Jolson Way in New York City

A few months after his death, Defense Secretary George Marshall presented the Medal for Merit for Jolson, "to whom this country owes a debt which cannot be repaid". The medal, carrying a citation noting that Jolson's "contribution to the U.N. action in Korea was made at the expense of his life", was presented to Jolson's son as Jolson's widow looked on.

Jolson has three stars on the Hollywood Walk of Fame for his contributions to radio, motion pictures, and the recording industry.

In 2000, a Golden Palm Star on the Palm Springs, California, Walk of Stars was dedicated to him. Jolson is also a member of the American Theater Hall of Fame.

The U.S. Postal Service honored him by issuing a 29-cent stamp that was unveiled by Erle Jolson Krasna, Jolson's fourth wife, at a ceremony in Lincoln Center on September 1, 1994. This stamp was one of a series honoring popular American singers, which included Bing Crosby, Nat King Cole, Ethel Merman, and Ethel Waters. In 2006, Jolson had a street in New York named after him with the help of the Al Jolson Society.

In October 2008, the documentary Al Jolson and The Jazz Singer, directed by German filmmaker Andrea Oberheiden, premiered at the 50th Lübeck Nordic Film Days, Lübeck, Germany, and won 1st Prize at an annual film competition in Kiel a few weeks later. In November 2007, a documentary shot by the same director, A Look at Al Jolson, was winner at the same festival.

== Legacy and influence ==
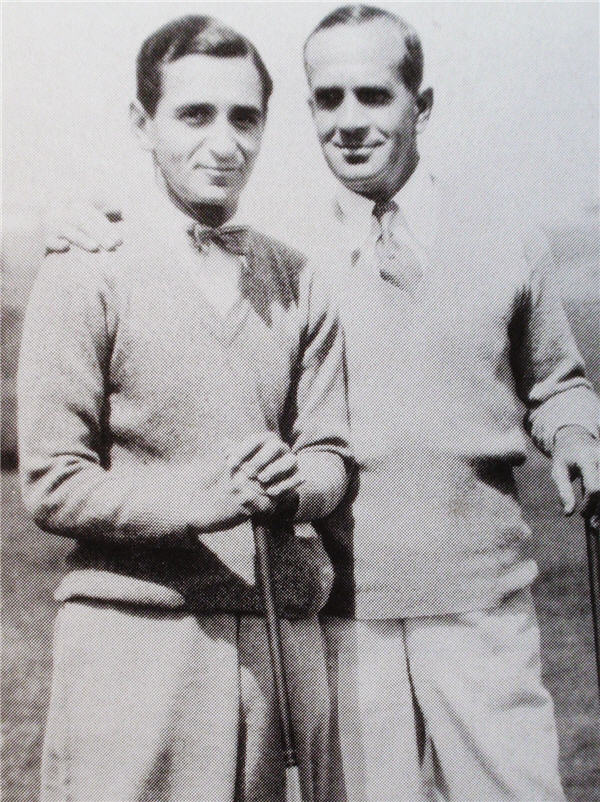
With Irving Berlin, c. 1927

According to music historians Bruce Crowther and Mike Pinfold: "During his time he was the best known and most popular all-around entertainer America (and probably the world) has ever known, captivating audiences in the theatre and becoming an attraction on records, radio, and in films. He opened the ears of White audiences to the existence of musical forms alien to their previous understanding and experience ... and helped prepare the way for others who would bring a more realistic and sympathetic touch to black musical traditions." Black songwriter Noble Sissle, in the 1930s, said "[h]e was always the champion of the Negro songwriter and performer, and was first to put Negroes in his shows". Of Jolson's "Mammy" songs, he adds, "with real tears streaming down his blackened face, he immortalized the Negro motherhood of America as no individual could." However, despite his history of being defensive of Jolson's attitude towards African Americans, Sissle would become more critical of Jolson's continued use of blackface and his mammy routine by 1938. The expansion of African American actors in American films in the 1930s, which would greatly overshadow the use of actors donning blackface, was also considered to be a dramatic turning point in the social acceptance of the controversial routine which previously gave Jolson huge stardom, with blackface being widely accepted more as a representation of racism and bigotry after 1930.

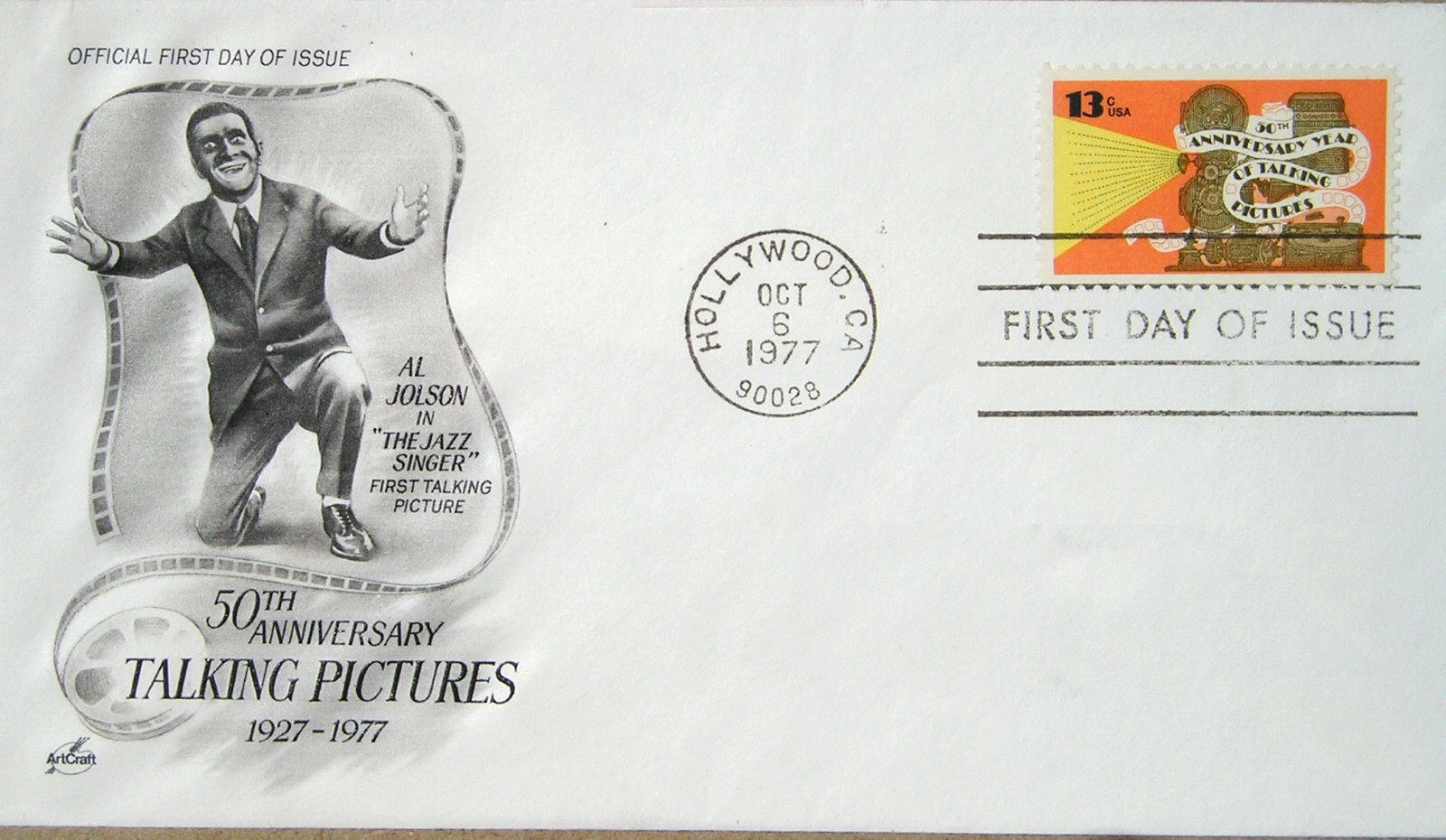
"50th Anniversary Year of Talking Pictures" stamp on first-day-of-issue cover featuring Jolson

Contrary to popular belief, Jolson's open Jewishness, including in The Jazz Singer, did not greatly weaken anti-semitism in the United States in the 1920s, with anti-semitism still remaining rampant in the country and Jolson and The Jazz Singer even being regarded as more an "exception" in a still largely anti-semitic environment rather than a sign that attitude towards Jews was greatly changing.

Jolson's signature style, loud and passionate, was soon eclipsed by the cooler and more intimate style of the crooners, singers such as Bing Crosby and Frank Sinatra, who dominated the pop charts in the 1930s, 1940s, and 1950s. While Jolson could and did croon, his basic style was formed in the era when a singer needed to project to the back of a theater with his own physical power; later singers who developed in the microphone era were freed from this constraint. However, his career would manage to be revitalized during his tours with the USO during World War II.

People and places that have been influenced by Jolson include:

Tony Bennett

My father ... took us to see one of the first talking pictures, The Singing Fool, in which Al Jolson sang "Sonny Boy". In a way, you could say that Jolson was my earliest influence as a singer. I was so excited by what I saw that I spent hours listening to Jolson and Eddie Cantor on the radio. In fact, I staged my first public performance shortly after seeing that movie ... to imitate Jolson.... I leaped into the living room and announced to the adults, who were staring at me in amazement, "Me Sonny Boy!" The whole family roared with laughter.

Irving Berlin

As the movies became a vital part of the entertainment industry, Berlin was forced to "reinvent himself as a songwriter". Biographer Laurence Bergreen wrote that while Berlin's music was "Too old-fashioned for progressive Broadway, his music was thoroughly up-to-date in conservative Hollywood." He had his earliest luck with the landmark sound film The Jazz Singer (1927), in which Jolson performed his song "Blue Skies". He wrote the music for Jolson's film Mammy (1930), which included hits such as "Let Me Sing and I'm Happy" and "Mammy".

Bing Crosby

Music historian Richard Grudens writes that Kathryn Crosby cheerfully reviewed the chapter about her beloved Bing and his inspiration, Al Jolson, where Bing had written, "His chief attribute was the sort of electricity he generated when he sang. Nobody in those days did that. When he came out and started to sing, he just elevated that audience immediately. Within the first eight bars he had them in the palm of his hand." In Crosby's Pop Chronicles interview, he fondly recalled seeing Jolson perform and praised his "electric delivery". Crosby's biographer Gary Giddins wrote of Crosby's admiration for Jolson's performance style: "Bing marveled at how he seemed to personally reach each member of the audience." Crosby once told a fan, "I'm not an electrifying performer at all. I just sing a few little songs. But this man could really galvanize an audience into a frenzy. He could really tear them apart."

Bobby Darin

Darin's biographer, David Evanier, writes that when Darin was a youngster, stuck at home because of rheumatic fever, "[h]e spent most of the time reading and coloring as well as listening to the big-band music and Jolson records.... He started to do Jolson imitations ... he was crazy about Jolson." Darin's manager, Steve Blauner, who also became a movie producer and vice president of Screen Gems, likewise began his career "as a little boy doing Al Jolson imitations after seeing The Jolson Story 13 times".

Neil Diamond

Journalist David Wild writes that the 1927 movie The Jazz Singer, would mirror Diamond's own life, "the story of a Jewish kid from New York who leaves everything behind to pursue his dream of making popular music in Los Angeles". Diamond says it was "the story of someone who wants to break away from the traditional family situation and find his own path. And in that sense, it 'is' my story." In 1972, Diamond gave the first solo concert performance on Broadway since Al Jolson, and starred in the 1980 remake of Jazz Singer, with Laurence Olivier and Lucie Arnaz.

Eddie Fisher

On a tour of the Soviet Union with his then wife, Elizabeth Taylor, Fisher wrote in his autobiography that "Khrushchev's mistress asked me to sing.... I was the first American to be invited to sing in the Kremlin since Paul Robeson. The next day the Herald-Tribune headlines [read] 'Eddie Fisher Rocks the Kremlin'. I gave them my best Jolson: "Swanee", "April Showers" and finally "Rock-A-Bye Your Baby with a Dixie Melody". I had the audience of Russian diplomats and dignitaries on their feet swaying with me." In 1951, Fisher dedicated his "smash hit" song, "Good-bye, G.I. Al", to Jolson, and presented a copy personally to Jolson's widow. With one of his later wives, Connie Stevens, he had a daughter, Joely Fisher, whose name honors Jolson. In 1968 he made a tribute album to Al Jolson called You Ain't Heard Nothin' Yet, the album included all the songs at the start of this paragraph. It was also his last album for RCA Victor.

Judy Garland

Garland performed a tribute to Jolson in her concerts of 1951 at the London Palladium and at the Palace Theatre in New York City. Both concerts were to become "central to this first of her many comebacks, and centered around her impersonation of Al Jolson ... performing 'Swanee' in her odd vocal drag of Jolson."

Ernest Hemingway

In A Moveable Feast, Ernest Hemingway wrote that "Zelda Fitzgerald ... leaned forward and said to me, telling me her great secret, 'Ernest, don't you think Al Jolson is greater than Jesus?'"

Jerry Lewis

Actor and comedian Jerry Lewis starred in a televised version (without blackface) of The Jazz Singer in 1959. Lewis's biographer, Murray Pomerance, writes, "Jerry surely had his father in mind when he remade the film", adding that Lewis himself "told an interviewer that his parents had been so poor that they could not afford to give him a bar mitzvah". In 1956, Lewis recorded "Rock-a-Bye Your Baby".

Jerry Lee Lewis

According to singer and songwriter Jerry Lee Lewis, "there were only four true American originals: Al Jolson, Jimmie Rodgers, Hank Williams, and Jerry Lee Lewis." "I loved Al Jolson", he said. "I still got all of his records. Even back when I was a kid I listened to him all the time."

Mario Lanza

Mario Lanza's biographer, Armando Cesari, writes that Lanza's "favorite singers included Al Jolson, Lena Horne, Tony Martin and Toni Arden".

David Lee Roth

Songwriter and lead singer of the rock group Van Halen, was asked during an interview in 1985, "When did you first decide that you wanted to go into show business?" He replied, "I was seven. I said I wanted to be Al Jolson. Those were the only records I had—a collection of the old breakable 78s. I learned every song and then the moves, which I saw in the movies."

Rod Stewart

British singer and songwriter Rod Stewart, during an interview in 2003, was asked, "What is your first musical memory?" Stewart replied: "Al Jolson, from when we used to have house parties around Christmas or birthdays. We had a small grand piano and I used to sneak downstairs.... I think it gave me a very, very early love of music."

Jackie Wilson

African-American singer Jackie Wilson recorded a tribute album to Jolson, You Ain't Heard Nothin' Yet, which included his personal liner note, "the greatest entertainer of this or any other era.... I guess I have just about every recording he's ever made, and I rarely missed listening to him on the radio.... During the three years I've been making records, I've had the ambition to do an album of songs, which, to me, represent the great Jolson heritage.. [T]his is simply my humble tribute to the one man I admire most in this business ... to keep the heritage of Jolson alive."

State of California

According to California historians Stephanie Barron and Sheri Bernstein, "few artists have done as much to publicize California as did Al Jolson" who performed and wrote the lyrics for "California, Here I Come". It is considered the unofficial song of California. Another example is the 1928 song "Golden Gate" (Dave Dreyer, Joseph Meyer, Billy Rose & Jolson).

Jolson's short 1926 film A Plantation Act, which was presumed to be a lost film by 1933, would eventually be rediscovered and restored by April 1995. Several rediscovered recordings of Jolson which are considered to be in public domain, such as the earliest recording of “Rock-a-bye Your Baby with a Dixie Melody,” a few obscurities, and a variety of radio appearances, would be re-released in April 2024 as part of the album Al Jolson: Rediscovered.

== Performing in blackface ==
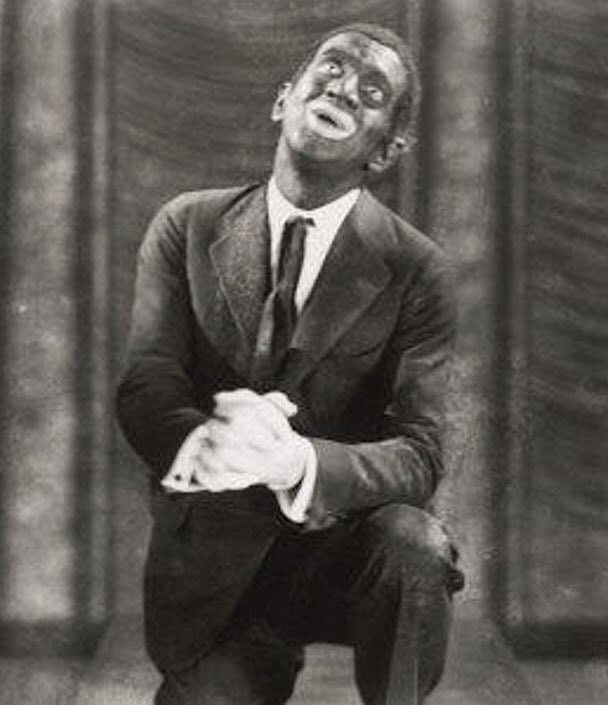
The Jazz Singer, 1927

Jolson often performed in blackface makeup. Performing in blackface makeup was a theatrical convention of many entertainers at the beginning of the 20th century, having its origin in the minstrel show, an American form of theater in which White actors wore blackface makeup for the purpose of portraying racial stereotypes of African Americans. According to film historian Eric Lott:

For the white minstrel man to put on the cultural forms of 'blackness' was to engage in a complex affair of manly mimicry.... To wear or even enjoy blackface was literally, for a time, to become black, to inherit the cool, virility, humility, abandon, or gaieté de coeur that were the prime components of white ideologies of black manhood.

In the retrospective view of a later era, however, the use of blackface is viewed by many as racist. Music critic Ted Gioia, commenting on Jolson's use of blackface, wrote:

Blackface evokes memories of the most unpleasant side of racial relations, and of an age in which white entertainers used the makeup to ridicule black Americans while brazenly borrowing from the rich black musical traditions that were rarely allowed direct expression in mainstream society. This is heavy baggage for Al Jolson.

=== As metaphor of mutual suffering ===
Jolson's blackface and singing style have been described as metaphors for Jewish and Black suffering throughout history. Jolson's first film, The Jazz Singer, for instance, is described by historian Michael Alexander as an expression of the liturgical music of Jews with the "imagined music of African Americans", noting that "prayer and jazz become metaphors for Jews and blacks." Playwright Samson Raphaelson, after seeing Jolson perform his stage show Robinson Crusoe, stated that "he had an epiphany: 'My God, this isn't a jazz singer', he said. 'This is a cantor!'" The image of the blackfaced cantor remained in Raphaelson's mind when he conceived of the story which led to The Jazz Singer.

Upon the film's release, the first full-length sound picture, film reviewers saw the symbolism and metaphors portrayed by Jolson in his role as the son of a cantor wanting to become a "jazz singer":

Is there any incongruity in this Jewish boy with his face painted like a Southern Negro singing in the Negro dialect? No, there is not. Indeed, I detected again and again the minor key of Jewish music, the wail of the Chazan, the cry of anguish of a people who had suffered. The son of a line of rabbis well knows how to sing the songs of the most cruelly wronged people in the world's history.

According to Alexander, Eastern European Jews were uniquely qualified to understand the music, noting how Jolson himself made the comparison of Jewish and African-American suffering in a new land in his film Big Boy: In a blackface portrayal of a former slave, he leads a group of recently freed slaves, played by Black actors, in verses of the classic slave spiritual "Go Down Moses". One reviewer of the film expressed how Jolson's blackface added significance to his role:

When one hears Jolson's jazz songs, one realizes that jazz is the new prayer of the American masses, and Al Jolson is their cantor. The Negro makeup in which he expresses his misery is the appropriate talis [prayer shawl] for such a communal leader.

Many in the Black community welcomed The Jazz Singer and hoped it would open film opportunities for Black performers. Audiences at Harlem's Lafayette Theater cried during the film, and Harlem's newspaper, Amsterdam News, called it "one of the greatest pictures ever produced." For Jolson, it wrote: "Every colored performer is proud of him."

=== Relations with African Americans ===
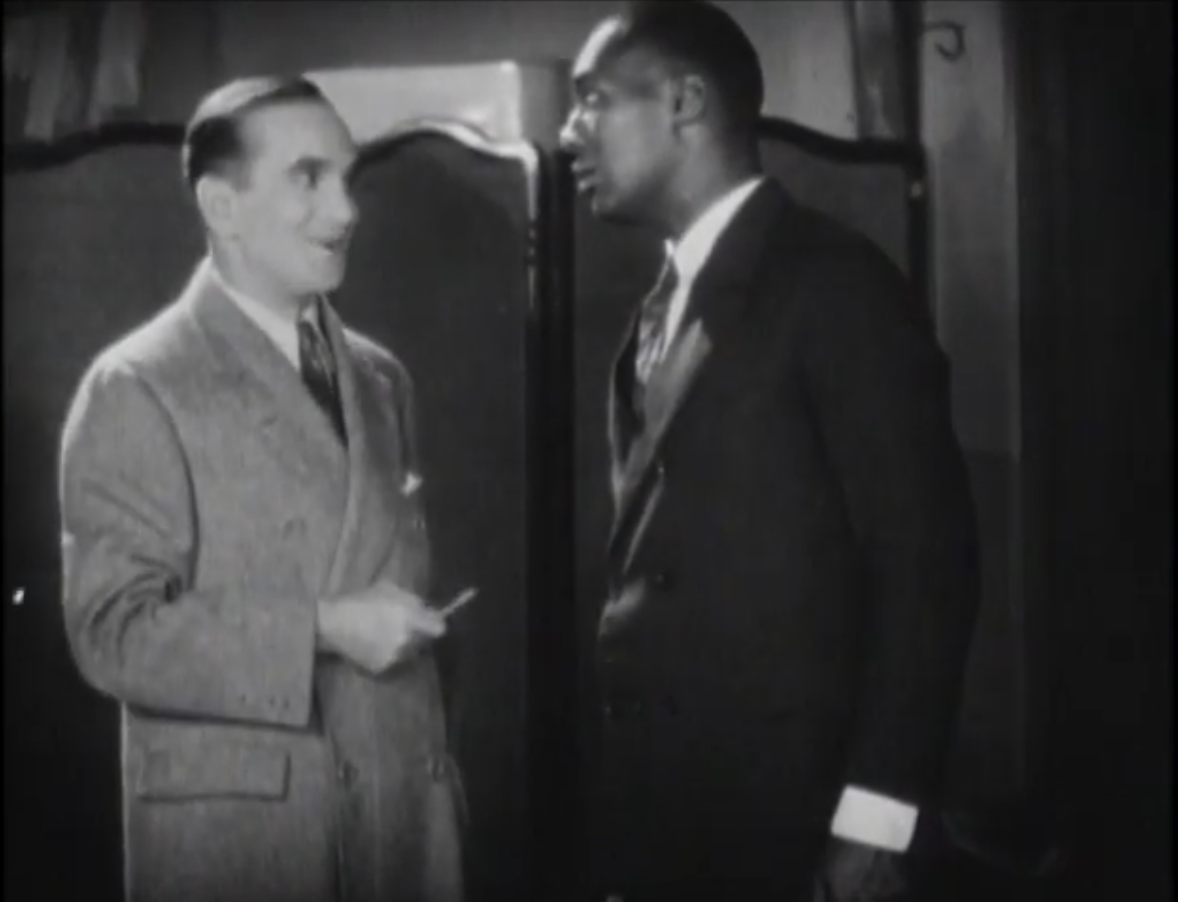
Al Jolson with an uncredited Black actor in The Singing Fool (1928). Jolson often advocated for the inclusion of Black actors in vaudeville and film.

Jolson's legacy as the most popular performer of blackface routines was complemented by his relationships with African-Americans and his appreciation and use of African-American cultural trends. Jolson first heard jazz, blues, and ragtime in the alleys of New Orleans. He enjoyed singing jazz, often performing in blackface, especially in the songs he made popular, such as "Swanee", "My Mammy", and "Rock-a-Bye Your Baby with a Dixie Melody".

While growing up, Jolson was friends with Bill "Bojangles" Robinson, who became a prominent tap dancer. In 1924, he promoted the play Appearances by Garland Anderson, which became the first production with an all-Black cast produced on Broadway. He also brought a Black dance team from San Francisco that he tried to put in a Broadway show, and demanded equal treatment for Cab Calloway, with whom he performed duets in the movie The Singing Kid.

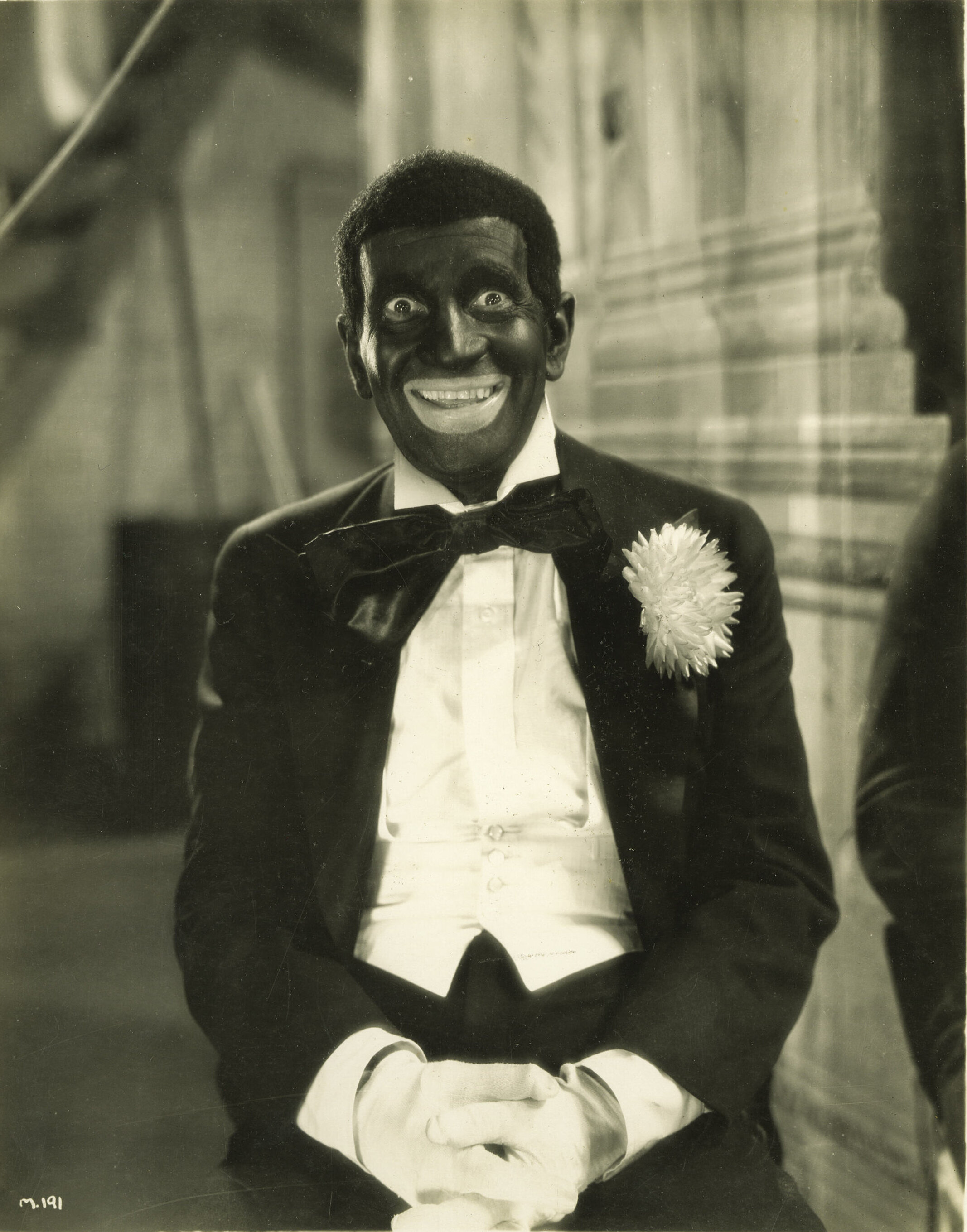
Jolson wearing blackface in the musical film Mammy (1930)

Jolson read in the newspaper that songwriters Eubie Blake and Noble Sissle, neither of whom he had ever heard of, were refused service at a Connecticut restaurant because of their race. He tracked them down and took them out to dinner, "insisting he'd punch anyone in the nose who tried to kick us out!" According to biographer Al Rose, Jolson and Blake became friends and went to boxing matches together.

Film historian Charles Musser notes, "African Americans' embrace of Jolson was not a spontaneous reaction to his appearance in talking pictures. In an era when African Americans did not have to go looking for enemies, Jolson was perceived a friend." In spite of this claim, Jewish Studies historian Michael Alexander acknowledged that no major African American newspaper had mentioned The Jazz Singer.

Jeni LeGon, a Black female tap dancer, recalls her life as a film dancer: "But of course, in those times it was a 'black-and-white world.' You didn't associate too much socially with any of the stars. You saw them at the studio, you know, nice—but they didn't invite. The only ones that ever invited us home for a visit was Al Jolson and Ruby Keeler."

British performer Brian Conley, former star of the 1995 British play Jolson, stated during an interview, "I found out Jolson was actually a hero to the black people of America. At his funeral, black actors lined the way, they really appreciated what he'd done for them."

Noble Sissle, who was by then president of the Negro Actors Guild, represented that organization at his funeral.

Jolson's physical expressiveness also affected the music styles of some Black performers. Music historian Bob Gulla writes that "the most critical influence in Jackie Wilson's young life was Al Jolson." He points out that Wilson's ideas of what a stage performer could do to keep their act an "exciting" and "thrilling performance" was shaped by Jolson's acts, "full of wild writhing and excessive theatrics". Wilson felt that Jolson "should be considered the stylistic [forefather] of rock and roll."

According to the St. James Encyclopedia of Popular Culture: "Almost single-handedly, Jolson helped to introduce African-American musical innovations like jazz, ragtime, and the blues to white audiences ... [and] paved the way for African-American performers like Louis Armstrong, Duke Ellington, Fats Waller, and Ethel Waters ... to bridge the cultural gap between black and white America."

Amiri Baraka wrote, "the entrance of the white man into jazz ... did at least bring him much closer to the Negro." He points out that "the acceptance of jazz by whites marks a crucial moment when an aspect of black culture had become an essential part of American culture."

However, highly influential African American newspaper The Pittsburgh Courier would become more critical of Jolson by 1938, with Noble Sissle also openly describing his "Mammy" routine and use of blackface as being humiliating towards African Americans.

== Filmography ==
Year	Title	Role	Notes
1926	A Plantation Act	Himself	Film debut
1927	The Jazz Singer	Jakie Rabinowitz	
1928	The Singing Fool	Al Stone	
1929	Sonny Boy	Himself	Cameo
1929	Say It with Songs	Joe Lane	
1929	New York Nights	Himself	Cameo
1930	Mammy	Al Fuller	
1930	Showgirl in Hollywood	Himself	Cameo
1930	Big Boy	Gus	
1933	Hallelujah, I'm a Bum	Bumper	
1934	Wonder Bar	Al Wonder	
1935	Go into Your Dance	Al Howard	
1936	The Singing Kid	Al Jackson	
1939	Rose of Washington Square	Ted Cotter	
1939	Hollywood Cavalcade	Himself	
1939	Swanee River	Edwin Pearce Christy	
1945	Rhapsody in Blue	Himself	
1946	The Jolson Story	Himself	Uncredited
1949	Jolson Sings Again	Himself	Uncredited
1949	Oh, You Beautiful Doll	Himself	Final film, Uncredited

== Theater ==
- La Belle Paree (1911)
- Vera Violetta (1911)
- The Whirl of Society (1912)
- The Honeymoon Express (1913)
- Children of the Ghetto (before 1915)
- Dancing Around (1914)
- Robinson Crusoe Jr. (1916)
- Sinbad (1918)
- Bombo (1921)
- Big Boy (1925)
- Artists and Models of 1925 (1925; added to cast in 1926)
- Big Boy (1926) (revival)
- The Wonder Bar (1931)
- Hold On to Your Hats (1940)

== Songs ==
- "That Haunting Melodie" (1911) – Jolson's first hit.
- "Ragging the Baby to Sleep" (1912) – sold over one million copies, and was awarded a gold disc in that year, only the fourth to be presented.
- "The Spaniard That Blighted My Life" (1912) – another million seller.
- "That Little German Band" (1913)
- "You Made Me Love You (I Didn't Want to Do It)" (1913)
- "Back to the Carolina You Love" (1914)
- "Sister Susie's Sewing Shirts for Soldiers" (1914)
- "Yaaka Hula Hickey Dula" (1916)
- "I Sent My Wife to the Thousand Isles" (1916)
- "I'm All Bound 'Round with the Mason Dixon Line" (1918)
- "My Mammy" (1918)
- "Rock-a-Bye Your Baby with a Dixie Melody" (1918)
- "Tell That to the Marines" (1919)
- "I'll Say She Does" (1919)
- "I've Got My Captain Working for Me Now" (1919)
- "Swanee" (1919)
- "Avalon" (1920)
- "O-H-I-O (O-My! O!)" (1921)
- "April Showers" (1921)
- "Angel Child" (1922)
- "That Wonderful Kid from Madrid" (1922)
- "Toot, Toot, Tootsie" (1922)
- "Juanita" (1923)
- "California, Here I Come" (1924)
- "I Wonder What's Become of Sally?" (1924)
- "I'm Sitting on Top of the World" (1926)
- "When the Red, Red Robin (Comes Bob, Bob, Bobbin' Along)" (1926)
- "Back in Your Own Backyard" (1928)
- "There's a Rainbow 'Round My Shoulder" (1928)
- "Sonny Boy" (1928)
- "Little Pal" (1929)
- "Liza (All the Clouds'll Roll Away)" (1929)
- "Let Me Sing and I'm Happy" (1930)
- "The Cantor (A Chazend'l Ofn Shabbos)" (1932)
- "You Are Too Beautiful" (1933)
- "Anniversary Song" (1946)
- "Alexander's Ragtime Band" (1947)
- "Carolina in the Morning" (1947)
- "About a Quarter to Nine" (1947)
- "Waiting for the Robert E. Lee" (1947)
- "Golden Gate" (1947)
- "When You Were Sweet Sixteen" (1947)
- "If I Only Had a Match" (1947)
- "When I Leave the World Behind" (1948)
- "After You've Gone" (1949)
- "Is It True What They Say About Dixie?" (1949)
- "Are You Lonesome Tonight?" (1950)
- "The Old Piano Roll Blues" (with the Andrews Sisters) (1950)

== Discography ==
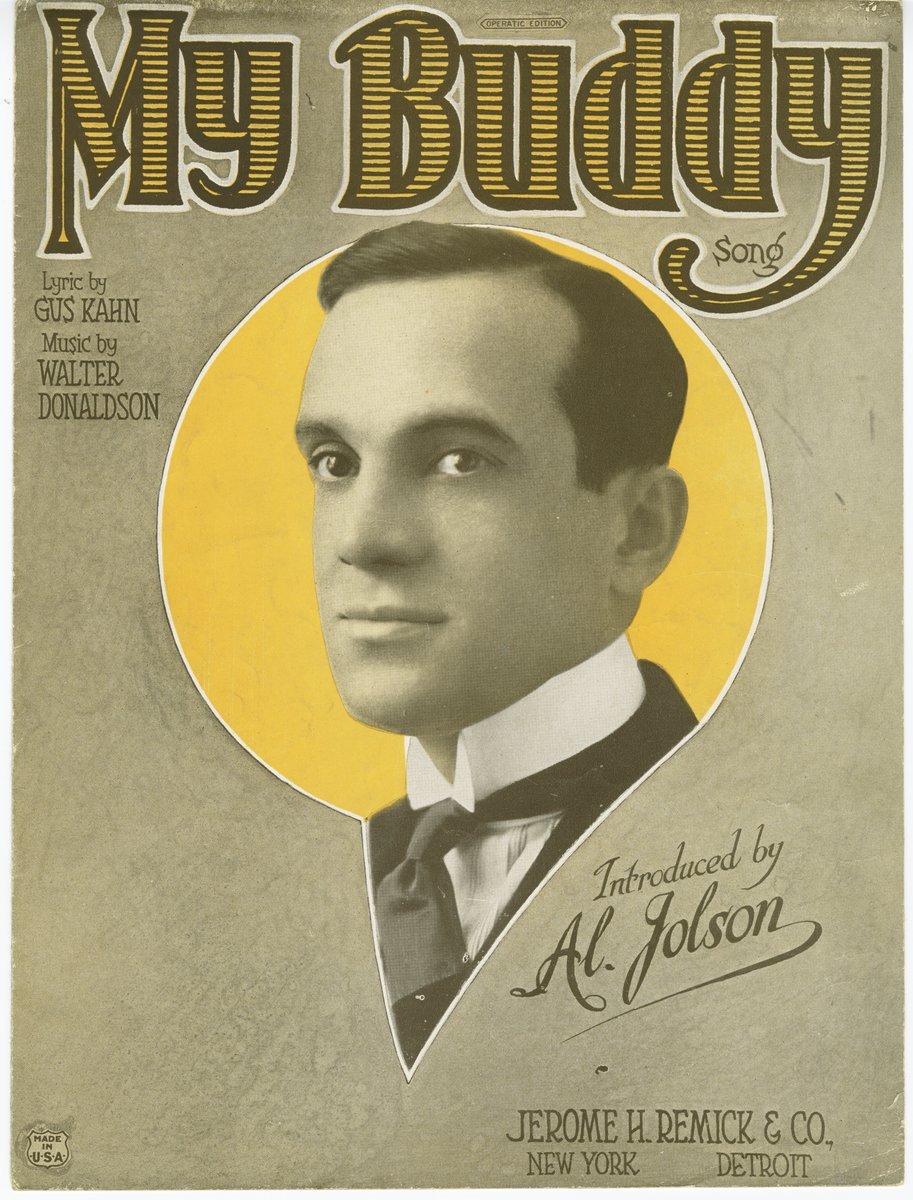
1922 sheet music

Albums

- 1946: Al Jolson in Songs He Made Famous (Decca 469)
  a.k.a. Al Jolson, Volume 1
- 1947: Al Jolson Souvenir Album (Decca 575)
  a.k.a. Al Jolson, Volume 2
- 1948: Al Jolson, Volume 3
- 1949: Jolson Sings Again
- 1949: Al Jolson Souvenir Album, Volume 4
- 1950: Stephen Foster Songs
- 1951: Al Jolson Souvenir Album, Volume 5
- 1951: Al Jolson Souvenir Album, Volume 6

== See also ==
- List of people from Harlem
