= Wonder Bar =

1934 film by Lloyd Bacon

- Film poster
- Directed by: Lloyd Bacon; Busby Berkeley
- Screenplay by: Earl Baldwin
- Produced by: Robert Lord; Hal Wallis
- Starring: Al Jolson; Kay Francis; Dolores del Río; Ricardo Cortez; Dick Powell; Guy Kibbee
- Cinematography: Sol Polito
- Edited by: George Amy
- Music by: Harry Warren; Al Dubin
- Production company: First National Pictures
- Distributed by: Warner Bros. Pictures
- Release date: February 28, 1934 (Strand Theatre)
- Running time: 84 minutes
- Country: United States
- Language: English
- Budget: $675,000
- Box office: $2,035,000

Wonder Bar is a 1934 American pre-Code musical drama film directed by Lloyd Bacon, with musical numbers choreographed and directed by Busby Berkeley. It is an adaptation of a Broadway musical of the same name that Al Jolson had starred in.

It stars Al Jolson, Kay Francis, Dolores del Río, Ricardo Cortez, Dick Powell, Guy Kibbee, Ruth Donnelly, Hugh Herbert, Louise Fazenda, Fifi D'Orsay, Merna Kennedy, Henry O'Neill, Robert Barrat, Henry Kolker, and Spencer Charters in the main roles.

For its time, Wonder Bar was considered risqué, barely passing the censors at the Hays Office. One musical number in particular, "Goin' to Heaven on a Mule", in which heaven was depicted with hundreds of Black People eating watermelon while they sang and danced, was considered in bad taste even in its day.

== Plot ==
The film is set in a Paris nightclub, with the stars playing the 'regulars' at the club. The movie revolves around two main story points, a romance and a more serious conflict with death, and several minor plots. All of the stories are enlivened from time to time by extravagant musical numbers.

The more serious story revolves around Captain Von Ferring (Robert Barrat), a German military officer. Ferring has gambled on the stock market and lost, now broke after dozens of failed investments, he is at the Wonder Bar to try and pull a one-night stand before killing himself the following day. Al Wonder (Al Jolson) knows about Ferring's plan.

Meanwhile, an elaborate romance is unfolding. The bar's central attraction is the Latin lounge dancing group led by Inez. Al Wonder has a secret attraction to Inez, who has a burning passion for Harry.

However, Harry is two-timing her with Liane (Kay Francis), who is married to the famous French banker Renaud (Henry Kolker). The story comes to a climax when Inez finds out that Harry and Liane plan to run away together and head to the United States. Inez, in a haze of jealousy, kills Harry during their dance number with a knife(after Harry uses a whip on her without pulling his punches). Al Wonder manages to conceal Harry's condition to protect Inez. He then places Harry's dead body in the back seat of Captain Von Ferring's auto,so that when Ferring commits suicide-by-automobile,Harry's death will be attributed to the auto crash/

Subplots are much lighter in nature. They involve several drunken routines by two businessmen and Al Wonder's various narrations as emcee of the floor show and manager of the club.

There are multiple songs and elaborate musical sequences performed by Al Wonder, Liane, Inez and Harry and Tommy, with the musical finale featuring a thirteen minute production with over 200 performers, and Al Jolson performing in blackface.

== Cast ==
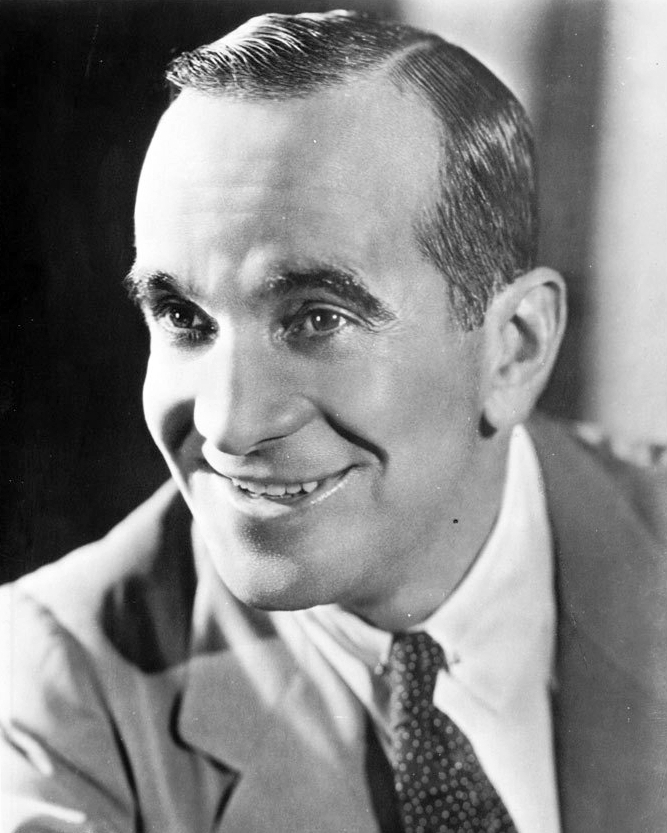
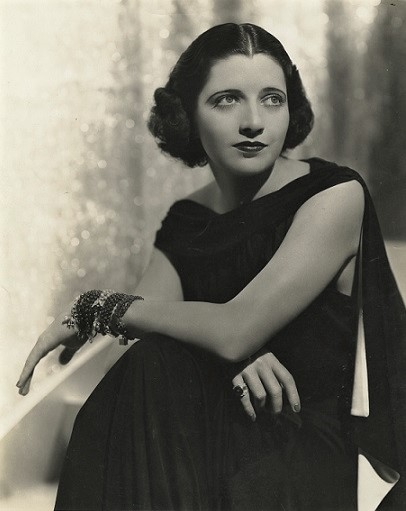
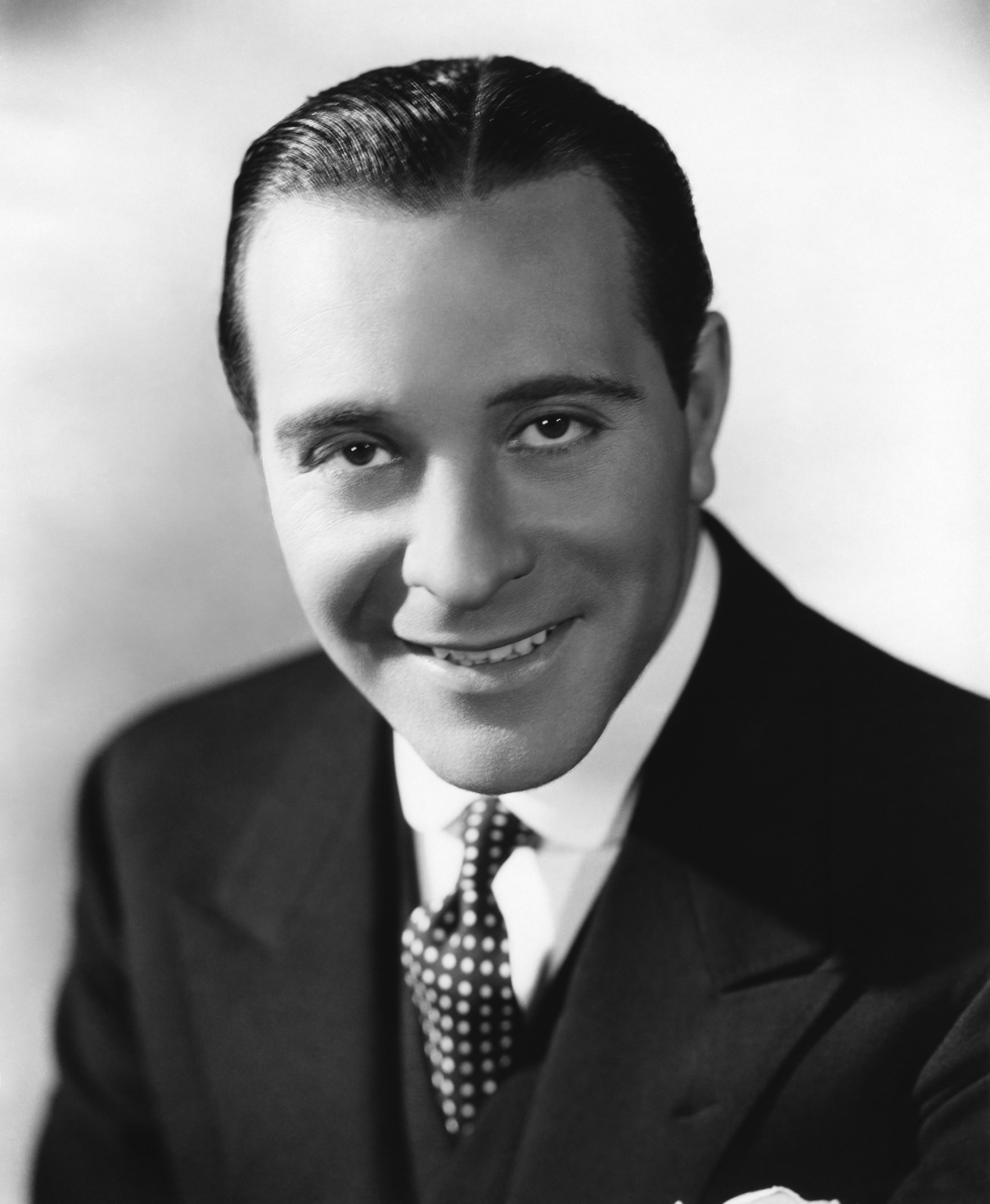
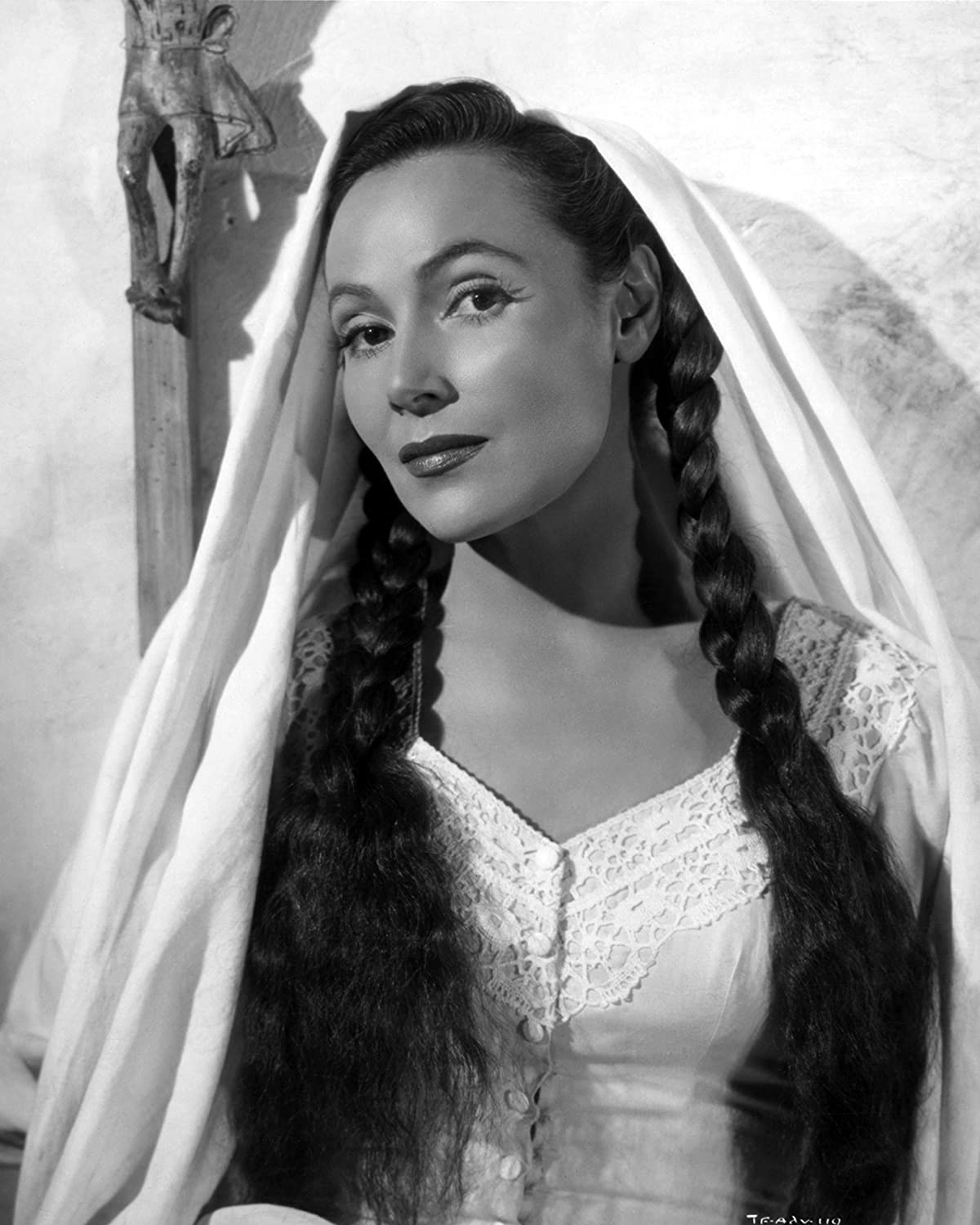
Top billed cast clockwise: Al Jolson, Kay Francis, Dolores del Río and Ricardo Cortez
- Al Jolson as Al Wonder
- Kay Francis as Liane
- Dolores del Río as Inez
- Ricardo Cortez as Harry
- Dick Powell as Tommy
- Guy Kibbee as Simpson
- Ruth Donnelly as Mrs. Simpson
- Hugh Herbert as Pratt
- Louise Fazenda as Mrs. Pratt
- Hal Le Roy as Hal
- Fifi D'Orsay as Mitzi
- Merna Kennedy as Claire
- Henry O'Neill as Richard - the Maitre'd
- Robert Barrat as Captain Hugo Von Ferring
- Henry Kolker as Mr. R.H. Renaud
- Spencer Charters as Pete

== Background and production ==
The film is based on a German play, Die Wunderbar, written by Géza Herczeg, Robert Katscher and Karl Farkas. The American broadway play, which Jolson starred in, was originally owned by Joseph M. Schenck, who sold it to Jack Warner for the film adaptation. Jolson said at the time that this movie would be his last, as he could make more money on the radio. He claimed that "playing in this picture" cost him a $100,000 radio contract.

When Warner Bros. announced the film, some of the potential stars listed to appear in the project included Joan Blondell, Adolphe Menjou, Aline MacMahon, Bette Davis, Glenda Farrell, Pat O'Brien, Lyle Talbot, Claire Dodd, Warren William and Allen Jenkins, alongside Jolson, Davis, Powell and Kibbee. Several of the cast members listed eventually "bowed out", because they felt like it was a "case of playing second fiddle to Al Jolson." American film director Frank Borzage was originally scheduled to direct the film. The movie was the feature film debut for seven-year-old Dick Jones, who had an uncredited role as "boy". (Note: When he was eleven years old, Jones was chosen by Walt Disney to be the voice of Pinocchio in the 1940 animated film classic.)

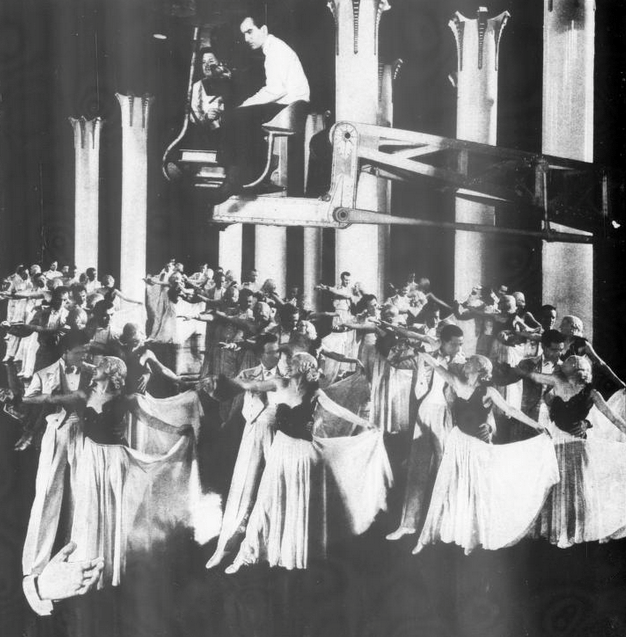
Busby Berkeley atop a camera crane filming a musical number for the movie

A huge indoor set, that covered an area equal to two city blocks, had to be constructed to house Busby Berkeley's elaborate chorus scenes. The construction crew included iron-workers, who built an iron track near the roof of the soundstage to carry the derricks, machinery, camera, and sound equipment, in order for Berkeley to make the "top shots." The set also required a massive amount of lighting that would have lit up a city of 20,000 people. The production required five weeks for shooting, and in addition, another five weeks were needed just for Berkeley's musical numbers.

Berkeley recalls that for the musical number "Don't Say Goodnight", the construction crew had to build sixty tall white movable columns, that moved against a black background; the columns were on separate tracks, independent of each other and all controlled electrically. That scene alone featured a hundred performers that danced with the columns, and then the columns would disappear, being replaced by a forest of silver trees with a white reindeer. In order to achieve this effect, he built an octagon of mirrors, each twenty-eight feet high and twelve feet wide, and inside this octagon was a revolving platform twenty-four feet in diameter.

Berkeley said there was skepticism from the studio, because they thought with all the mirrors, the camera would be seen. He says he figured out how not for the cameras to be seen by using eight little makeup compacts, and discovered there was a way of moving at the center of the mirrors without being reflected.

Berkeley experimented with a pencil that had a small strip of white tape on it. He moved the pencil around to the point where he could look at the tiny mirrors and not see the white tape. The camera would act like the white tape. Buzz had it placed on a piece of pipe, with the pipe acting as the pencil. Where the mirrors butted together stood a narrow white column. If the camera was placed in just the right position facing the column, its reflection wouldn’t be seen.

Berekely said in order for the camera operator to film the sequence, they dug a hole in the stage floor and "put the camera on the piece of pipe; the operator then laid flat on his stomach underneath the stage and crawled and moved around slowly with the turning of the camera."

In 1934, choreographer Larry Ceballos filed a $100,000 lawsuit against Warner Bros. and Berkeley with two claims. The second claim alleged that Berkeley "poached a dance idea" for the film Wonder Bar, which involved mirrors to create a mise-en-abyme effect. In response, the studio's contract lawyer said he was confident Ceballos's claim had "no basis." Ceballos eventually lost his lawsuit on both claims. (Note: The first claim was a dispute over Ceballos receiving no acknowledgment or credit from Warner Bros. for directing two dance numbers in the 1933 film Footlight Parade.)

=== Cast experiences ===
Photoplay reported that some members of the cast were not happy with their parts, and that no one on the lot wanted to play in the picture and practically everybody in the cast was dragged in. With the exception of Dolores Del Rio, whom Jolson personally picked for her part, "every player in the picture came to work in handcuffs, so to speak."

Kay Francis said she didn't like the part the first time it was suggested to her, and after she got the script, she liked it less, complaining it was essentially a bit part. She went on to say that it was a part any one of twenty girls on the set could play just as well as her. She told them she didn't want to do it, but the studio insisted, and Francis played the part without any rewrites.

Francis further stated that no actress likes to play an insignificant part—especially if it has no place in the script and could be cut out entirely without hurting the story—but it is not the mere playing of a small bit that I resent in this instance. If Wonder Bar were being made by an all-star cast from this studio, I wouldn't object to doing a minor part. Then I would feel that it was a matter of give and take between players on this lot. But this is different. Not only was I cast to a role in a picture I didn't want any part of but I was put in a picture in which the male lead is not recognized as a screen star and the girl with the only feminine part that can be called a part, is borrowed from another studio.

Almost unanimously, the players in the cast felt that Francis had ample grounds for her feeling. Author and film historian James Robert Parish says that one reason for her dissatisfaction is because Bacon had cut some of Francis's scenes to highlight more of Del Rio, and "the front office, annoyed by the demands and temperament of their top goddess, joyfully approved the changes."

Dick Powell said when they talked to him about the project, he told them he didn't want to do it, because he knew Jolson would never let another singer do anything in it, but he didn't know how much Jolson wouldn't until he took the good song that was assigned to him, and in exchange, gave him the eight bars Jolson didn't like. He stated that he went up to the office two or three times, in an attempt to be taken off the picture, but it didn't happen. He remarked: "I've got to go through with it and take the crumbs that fall my way."

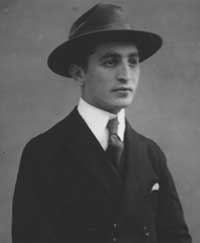
Music composer Harry Warren

Harry Warren, the music composer for the film, recalled that writing for Jolson really wasn't a problem, and he never criticized his and Al Dubin's work, but Jolson was "dying to get his name on the sheet music." Warren said that Jolson had asked the pair if he could just write a verse or two, which he had done with other songwriters, but the pair was adamant that his name wouldn't appear on their material. Warren went on to say that "it was great to have Jolson do your songs—he really knew how to put them over—but he liked people to think they were all his."

=== Censorship issues ===
Film historian Mark Vieira says the film faced censorship issues with the Studio Relations Committee (SRC) of the Motion Picture Producers and Distributors of America (MPPDA), who applied the Hays Code to film production. (Note: In 1930, the Hayes Office, which was established as a self-monitoring agency set up by the film industry, instituted a strict Production Code that censored a range of behaviors on screen. Made even more stringent in 1934, the Production Code censored any film that portrayed, among other things, cohabitation, seduction, violence, nudity, and, more specifically, any references to homosexuality.) In October 1933, producer and story editor Robert Lord presented Earl Baldwin's script to the SRC. James Wingate, who was partially responsible for enforcing the code, recommended thirteen changes to the script, including removal of the "irregular sex relationship" between Dolores Del Rio and her partner, Ricardo Cortez, who whips her. After receiving the recommendations, Lord told producer Hal Wallis: "The changes demanded by the Hays Office seem to me even more idiotic than usual. I would earnestly recommend that we go ahead and make the picture as is." Wallis went ahead and made a few of the recommended changes, submitted those back to Wingate, and then just ignored him.

In December 1933, the project was behind schedule and Lord was still busy working on two of the musical numbers, which included the finale, "Goin’ to Heaven on a Mule". Lord once again dropped a line to Wallis: "Granted, no intelligent person could object to it but the various boards of censorship throughout the country have never been distinguished for their intelligence." At this point, Lord had two options, he could discuss it with Jason Joy of the SRC, before moving forward with the number, or just go ahead and make it, and then show it to the SRC, hoping they would listen to their reasoning for including the number, if the SRC voiced any objections. Instead, Lord chose option three, which was to show the film to Joy and Geoffrey Shurlock, without including the two numbers, assuring them that "there was nothing to worry about in the two numbers."

If ever there was a film that thumbed its nose at the Studio Relations Committee, it was Wonder Bar.

After the film's release, Joseph Breen, was put in charge with enforcing the production code. When Hays Office counsel Vincent Hart viewed the film two months after it was already in theatres, he went to Breen and reported that there was "one item which the audience did not seem to relish." Hart told Breen that the scene in question was in the ballroom "where a man and a woman are shown dancing, and into the scene comes an effeminate-looking youth who taps the dancing man on the shoulder and asks 'May I cut in?' whereupon the man dancing with the girl smiles, leaves her, and the two men dance off together." Breen then proceeded to check the film's script they had on file, and he found it on page 25: "The man and the youth dance off together — the girl walks disgustedly off the floor."

Breen was unhappy the scene had been overlooked, or simply ignored, by the previous SRC, so he fired off a letter to Jack Warner requesting that he be allowed to see a screening of the entire film. After a week had gone by with no response from Warner, or anyone else at the studio, he told members of his office staff that: "it is quite evident that this gentleman is giving me the run-around; he evidently thinks that this is the smart thing to do." Nonetheless, even though Breen never received a response from Warner, he was pleased when the state censorship boards in Ohio and Pennsylvania cut the scene.

=== Musical numbers ===
Al Jolson on stage performing at the Wonder Bar

The music and lyrics for the production were written by Harry Warren and Al Dubin, while Leo F. Forbstein directed the Vitaphone Orchestra. At that time, the orchestra was still being recorded on the set with the singers. Berkeley created and directed the sequences for "Don't Say Goodnight" and "Goin' to Heaven on a Mule". American song lyricist Irving Kahal and composer Sammy Fain were initially set to write the music for the film.

Film historian Tony Thomas said musically, the film is "exceptionally well scored, and although none of the compositions were to become lasting favorites, their quality is high and they are well integrated with the rather complicated plot lines."

Songs and musical sequences

- "Vive La France"
- "Walse Amoreuse"
- "Tango del Rio"
- "Wonder Bar"
- "Don't Say Goodnight"
- "Fairer on the Riviera"
- "Why Do I Dream These Dreams?"
- "Goin' to Heaven on a Mule"

== Critical analysis and themes ==
=== Racial theme ===
Film historian Richard Barrios highlights the musical number, "Goin' to Heaven on a Mule", choreographed and directed by Berkeley, which was the film's finale, as an example of the racial stereotype of using blackface, calling it the "blackface number to end 'em all." The number was a minstrel show parody of the 1930 play, The Green Pastures, by Marc Connelly, and was the largest minstrel show ever produced with over 200 performers. Professor Arthur Knight notes that Warner Bros. made the number the centerpiece of their advertising campaign, proudly stating: "'Goin' to Heaven on a Mule' is a musical creation so starlingly different that to show you one single flash of its forty-two unforgettable scenes would be to rob you of the greatest thrill you've ever had in the theatre." According to academic Michael Alexander, Jolson was so impressed with the musical number, he considered it the "greatest film production to date."

Berkeley biographer Jeffrey Spivak, said "it would be disingenuous to laud the number for its directorial wizardry without noting the inflammatory nature of its racist imagery and derogatory lyrics." Spivak contends that the dreamlike set pieces, such as the tree of hanging pork chops and the life-size watermelons, were not created with malicious intent. Rather, Berkeley's enormous production budget "meant eschewed sensitivity to any one group; his true goal was to get the shot and make it pretty." According to Berkeley, the number was meant as a tribute to the Harlem Renaissance.

Author Willard Spiegelman argues the thirteen-minute sequence with Jolson in blackface has nothing to do with the plot of the film, and "contains virtually every black cliche and stereotype one can imagine." He points to the pork chops growing on the trees, Black women waving giant watermelon slices, Jolson eating fried chicken, and a framed picture of Abraham Lincoln smiling down on an all-blackface heaven, as evidence of "the most egregious" scene in the movie. Film scholar Robert Jackson agrees, stating that the musical number "constitutes a strong contender for the most racially offensive Hollywood musical of all time," citing the pork chops and watermelon slices, with Jolson in blackface, in a "surreal visit from the barnyard to heaven."

=== Gay theme ===
In the 1930s, for the people striving toward self-knowledge, Hollywood stars became important models in the foundation of gay identity.

— Andrea Weiss

Another scene in the movie commented on involves a handsome man, asking a dancing couple if he could cut in. The female partner, expecting his attention, agrees, only to see him dance with her male partner. Jolson then flaps his wrist and says, "Boys will be boys! Woo!" Barrios argues that "in the intimate annals of early gay film history this scene holds a special place; like a few other emblematic moments from little-known films, the male-male dance resonates in a way that no one at the time could have realized. It sums up 1930s Hollywood's easy comfort with homosexuality. It evokes the end of the pansy craze, when films were moving away from cartoons toward more naturalistic images of gay men and women: these two are, in essence, a serious romantic couple. In its brevity and in the fact that we know nothing of these men and their lives besides this one dance, it conveys the fleeting quality of so many gay images on film." Film historian David Lugowski stated that "however ridiculous the two men dancing arm in arm may have made closeted gay men in small towns feel, once Jolson made the requisite wisecrack, that scene suggested that such people did exist."

Barrios also points to a less conspicuous gay character that is shown in the musical sequence "Goin' to Heaven on a Mule". When Jolson first arrives in heaven in full blown blackface, he is greeted by a "big sissy angel" prancing around, who measures him for his angel wings. (Note: Musical comedian Eddie Foy Jr. portrayed the "sissy angel" in an uncredited role.)

=== Dance theme ===
Film scholar Knut Hickethier says the film is an important example of framing and ornamentation in dance films. Hickethier argues that the film elevates the simple act of a dance by using advanced cinematic techniques (camera work, montage, production design) to transform the physical setting into an altered, and structured space, all while maintaining the focus on the physical performance.

Hickethier cites the scene where Berkeley uses the octagon of mirrors for its camera work and evolving set design to transform a simple dance exhibition into a fantastic visual spectacle. It progresses from an intimate club setting where a couple is briefly joined by a chorus line to a grander stage. The camera movement shifts from tracking shots to an overhead perspective, capturing a multiplication of dancers, mirrors, and pillars. The sequence concludes with the physical space dissolving into an abstract, infinitely multiplied cinematic realm, acquiring a surreal and fantastic quality. He opines that the "focus here is not on the dancers, but on the spectators. It is they, who are supposed to be drawn into the movements to experience the whirlwind of emotions." In conclusion, he states that Berkeley sometimes "drove the producers mad with his choreographies and the staging of his dance pieces", but his films set a precedent worldwide and in the end inspired Siegfried Kracauer’s famous formula of the "ornament of the masses".

== Release ==
The film had its premiere on February 28, 1934 at the Strand Theatre in Times Square, New York City. The movie had its general release the following month. The film was one of Warner's biggest hits of the year. According to Warner Bros. records it earned $1,264,000 domestically and $771,000 internationally. Jolson's contract with Warner Bros. stipulated that he would receive 10% of the film's gross receipts.

=== Remake ===
In 1952, Warner Bros. announced they were going to remake the film with Danny Thomas taking over the role played by Jolson. It was supposed to be released the following year, and be "filmed in color". The studio was also supposed to add new musical numbers to the original score. Thomas appeared in the 1952 film The Jazz Singer, which was a remake of the 1927 "first talking picture", The Jazz Singer, which also starred Jolson.

=== Home media ===
In 1992, MGM/UA released a seven-disc boxed set on laser-disc titled "The Al Jolson Collection (1927-36)"; which included Wonder Bar. The same year, a two disc compilation of musical numbers put together by George Feltenstein at MGM/UA for "The Busby Berkeley Disc", was released on laser disc, which featured two musical numbers from the film: "Don't Say Goodnight" and "Goin' To Heaven On A Mule"

In March 2009, the film was released for online sale only by the Warner Archive as a DVD-R, which means that the disc was recorded on demand per orders received, commonly known as manufacturing on demand. It was a "bare-bones release", with no extra features.

== Reception ==
British film critic Leslie Halliwell gave it two of four stars, writing: "curious musical drama with an interesting cast and fairly stunning numbers." Leonard Maltin wrote it is "very strange, often tasteless musical drama with murder, romance, and Busby Berkley's incredible "Goin' to Heaven on a Mule" production number; full of outrageous racial stereotypes."

Variety Magazine wrote the film "has got about everything; romance, flash, dash, class, color, songs, star-studded talent and almost every known requisite to assure sturdy attention; as an essential technical requisite the Forbstein batoning is full of verve and color." Time Magazine noted that like other recent Warner Brothers productions. Wonder Bar contains more than its quota of obscenity. Film critic Kevin Thomas opined that "Busby Berkeley's mind-boggling 'Goin' to Heaven on a Mule', is one of the most tasteless examples of Hollywood stereotyping of blacks."

Edwin Schallert from the Los Angeles Times wrote it is "musically enticing, spectacular in its setting and dancing numbers, and with a plot that can be taken at one's leisure, and as it goes, the film assures a great sufficiency of entertainment; it is star-illumined as a picture can be." Mae Tinée of the Chicago Tribune wrote "the story holds your interest and Jolson gives all he has; the nicest song and dance number is 'Don't Say Goodnight', and the acting throughout is splendid."

Kate Cameron of the New York Daily News said "most of the comedy is furnished by Jolson and the fun and the wise cracks do not always come within the bounds of good taste, but for the most part the fooling is of a harmless variety that delights the audience. Dolores Del Rio and Ricardo Cortez dance beautifully together and their very good looks are the principal ornamental touches to the film."

== Accolades ==
In April 1934, the film was selected by Photoplay as one of the "Best Pictures of the Month", and Dolores Del Rio and Ricardo Cortez, were both selected as one of the "Best Performances of the Month", for their roles in the film.

== See also ==
- Films featuring blackface
- List of American films of 1934
- List of LGBTQ-related films of the 1930s
- List of entertainers who performed in blackface
