= Michael Alexander =

Michael Alexander or Mike Alexander may refer to:

- Michael Alexander (academic) (born 1970), American scholar of Jewish history
- Michael Alexander (bishop) (1799–1845), first Anglican bishop of the Diocese of Jerusalem
- Michael Alexander (British Army officer) (1920–2004), British Army officer and writer
- Michael Alexander (diplomat) (1936–2002), British diplomat
- Michael Alexander (Trinidadian boxer) (born 1993), Trinidadian boxer
- Michael J. Alexander (1941–2023), British professor of English literature
- Mike Alexander (gridiron football) (born 1965), National Football League wide receiver
- Mike Alexander (1977–2009), bassist for English thrash metal band Evile
- Mike Alexander (racing driver) (born 1957), NASCAR Winston Cup driver and 1982 NASCAR Weekly Series national champion
