= Let Me Sing and I'm Happy =

"Let Me Sing – and I'm Happy"

Single by Al Jolson
- Released: 1930
- Label: Brunswick 4721
- Songwriter: Irving Berlin

"Let Me Sing and I'm Happy"

Single by Al Jolson
- B-side: "If I Only Had a Match"
- Released: 1948
- Label: Decca 4721

"Let Me Sing and I'm Happy" is a song written by Irving Berlin and introduced by Al Jolson in the 1930 film Mammy.

== Reception ==
The Commonweal magazine opined upon the film's release: "[Mr. Jolson] can make such songs as "Let Me Sing and I'm Happy" [...] seem to have an importance quite beyong their mildly tuneful worth." The New Movie Magazine called the song "the best of [...] Mammy numbers".

The song became a hit and one of Jolson's signature tunes.

Steven Suskin called the song "warm" and "genuine" in his 1990 song catalogue.

In their book Irving Berlin: A Life in Song, Philip Furia and Graham Wood name "Let Me Sing and I'm Happy" as one of Berlin's most buoyant songs.
