= Mammy (1930 film) =

1930 film

- Directed by: Michael Curtiz
- Written by: Irving Berlin (play); James Gleason (play); Joseph Jackson; Gordon Rigby
- Produced by: Walter Morosco
- Starring: Al Jolson; Lois Moran; Lowell Sherman; Noah Beery
- Cinematography: Barney McGill
- Edited by: Owen Marks
- Music by: Louis Silvers
- Production company: Warner Bros. Pictures
- Distributed by: Warner Bros. Pictures
- Release date: March 26, 1930
- Running time: 95 minutes 84 minutes (existent)
- Country: United States
- Language: English
- Budget: $786,000
- Box office: $947,000

Mammy is a 1930 American pre-Code musical comedy-drama film with Technicolor sequences, released by Warner Bros. Pictures. The film starred Al Jolson and was a follow-up to his previous film, Say It with Songs (1929). Mammy became Al Jolson's fourth feature, following earlier screen efforts as The Jazz Singer (1927), The Singing Fool (1928) and Say It with Songs (1929). The film relives Jolson's early years as a minstrel man. The songs were written by Irving Berlin, who is also credited with the original story titled Mr. Bones.

== Plot ==
The film as it survives now.

The story deals with the joys and tribulations of a travelling minstrel troupe known as the Merry Meadow Minstrels. Al Jolson plays as a blackface endman while Lowell Sherman plays as the interlocutor. Hobart Bosworth plays as the owner of the show, while his daughter, played by Lois Moran, serves as Al Jolson's love interest in the picture. Sherman's character, however, is also in love with Moran's. The show is in a miserable state until Jolson entertains a sheriff and manages to convince him to invest in the show. The show becomes very successful thanks to this investment and Jolson is eventually able to visit his mother. Some time after he returns, he tells Moran that he loves her and this causes Sherman to become jealous. After a heated argument between Jolson and Sherman over Moran, a character played by Mitchell Lewis, who is upset because he was caught cheating at cards, puts real bullets in Jolson's stage gun. Since Jolson pretends to shoot Sherman in the minstrel show act, Lewis knows that this will result in Sherman's death and that Jolson will be blamed for the murder. After Sherman is shot, Jolson is arrested but manages to escape and take a freight train out of town. Eventually, Lewis confesses to the crime and Jolson is thereby proven to be innocent.

== Cast ==
- Al Jolson as Al Fuller
- Lois Moran as Nora Meadows
- Lowell Sherman as Billy West / Westy
- Louise Dresser as Mother Fuller
- Hobart Bosworth as Meadows
- Tully Marshall as Slats
- Mitchell Lewis as Hank Smith / Tambo
- Jack Curtis as Sheriff Tremble

== Songs ==
- "Let Me Sing and I'm Happy"
- "Here We Are"
- "Who Paid the Rent for Mrs. Rip Van Winkle?"
- "The Knights of the Road" (missing on surviving prints)
- "The Call of the South" (missing on surviving prints)
- "Yes, We Have No Bananas"
- "Miserere"
- "Across The Breakfast Table, Looking At You"
- "In the Morning"
- "Night Boat to Albany"
- "Pretty Baby"
- "When You and I Were Young, Maggie"
- "Mammy"
- "To My Mammy"

== Box office ==
According to Warner Bros records the film earned $789,000 domestically and $158,000 internationally.

== Preservation ==
The original Technicolor sequences were found in a Dutch print (a copy of the International Sound Version) which had Dutch titles inserted in several places. This print was restored by the UCLA Film & Television Archive, and released on DVD from the Warner Archive Collection, along with its Overture and Exit Music. Unfortunately, sections of those Technicolor sequences were lost when Dutch titles were inserted, and some of the cuts from color to sepia tinted black and white are not smooth. Additionally, two songs are missing from all existing prints that were in the original release: "The Call of the South" and "Knights of the Road". They were written by Irving Berlin and sung by Al Jolson.

== See also ==
- List of early color feature films
