= Robinson Crusoe Jr. =

1941 film by Norman McCabe

- Title card
- Directed by: Norman McCabe
- Story by: Melvin Millar
- Produced by: Leon Schlesinger
- Starring: Mel Blanc
- Music by: Carl W. Stalling
- Animation by: Vive Risto
- Color process: Black and white
- Production company: Leon Schlesinger Productions
- Distributed by: Warner Bros. Pictures
- Release date: October 25, 1941
- Running time: 7 min
- Country: United States
- Language: English

Robinson Crusoe Jr. is a 1941 American animated comedy short film directed by Norman McCabe. The short was released on September 20, 1941. It is part of the Looney Tunes series, the 93rd cartoon to feature Porky Pig and the first cartoon to be directed solely by McCabe, as he replaced Bob Clampett as director of his former unit after Clampett moved to Tex Avery's unit.

== Plot ==
Porky goes on a journey on his boat, though many mice leave it due to believing the ship to be prone to sinking. Porky believes the ship is guaranteed to be safe, but ends up having it destroyed in a hurricane. He wounds up on an island where Friday welcomes him, having apparently prepared for the story. Friday drinks coffee and sings.

On Monday, Porky finds a parrot who refuses to speak as he is waiting for the "64th dollar question". He then finds animals hogging a water dispenser, escaping upon noticing Porky except for a tiger cub who cleans up the mess. He finds monkeys playing cards on and under the table as well as a monkey failing to climb a "slippery elm". He finds a human footprint, which leads to cannibals who attack Porky and Friday. They leave on an improvised motorboat from a log and use an American flag to repel the spears thrown by the cannibals.

== Home media ==
This short is available on disc 5 of the Porky Pig 101 DVD set.

== See also ==
- Porky Pig filmography
- Looney Tunes and Merrie Melodies filmography (1940–1949)
- List of animated films in the public domain in the United States
