= Michael Alexander (academic) =

American academic (born 1970)

Michael Scott Alexander (born 1970) is a professor and Maimonides Endowed Professor in Jewish Studies in the religious studies department of the University of California, Riverside.

He attended the University of Pennsylvania as an undergraduate in oriental studies and received his PhD in religious studies in 1999 from Yale University.

== Published works ==
=== Books ===
- Jazz Age Jews. Princeton University Press. 2001. ISBN 978-0-691-11653-2.

=== Articles ===
- “Frankfurter Among the Anarchists: ‘The Case of Sacco and Vanzetti.’” Studies in Contemporary Jewry Vol. XVII. Edited by Eli Lederhendler. New York: Oxford University Press, 2001: 175-191.
- “Exile and Alienation in America.” American Jewish History 90(2) (June 2002): 165–171.
- “The Triumph of the Jewish Therapeutic.” Reviews in American History 33(2) (June 2005): 287–292.
- “The Meaning of American Jewish History.” Jewish Quarterly Review 96(3) (Summer 2006): 423–432.
- “The Jewish Bookmaker: Gambling, Legitimacy, and the American Political Economy.” Studies in Contemporary Jewry Vol. XXIII. Edited by Ezra Mendelsohn, 54–69. New York: Oxford University Press, 2008.
- “Golda and the Court Jew: Golda Meir, Henry Kissinger, and the Personas They Denied,” in Gender and Jewish History. Editors: Marion A. Kaplan, Deborah Dash Moore. Bloomington and Indianapolis: Indiana University Press, 2010: 320–335.

== Awards ==
- 2002: National Jewish Book Award in the Jewish-Christian Relations category for Jazz Age Jews
