= Al Jolson discography =

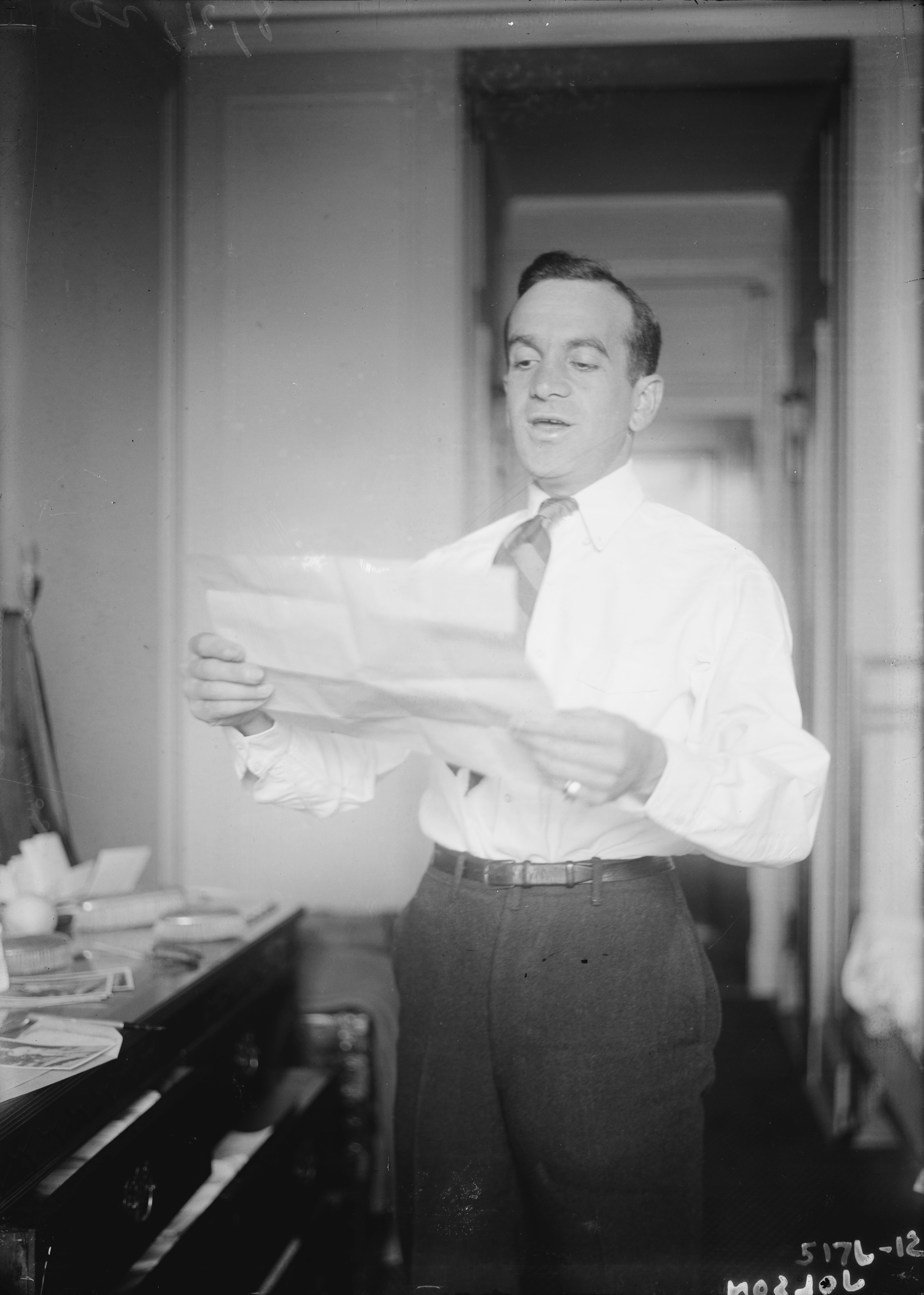
Jolson in the 1920's

The discography of American singer and actor Al Jolson comprises hundreds of singles and several studio albums.

== Albums ==
Title	Album details	Chart
Title	Album details	US
Al Jolson in Songs He Made Famous a.k.a. Al Jolson Album and Al Jolson, Volume 1	Released: 1946; Label: Decca; Formats: 4 phonograph records (A-469)	1
Al Jolson Souvenir Album a.k.a. Al Jolson Album and Al Jolson, Volume 2	Released: 1947; Label: Decca; Formats: 4 phonograph records (A-575)	1
Al Jolson, Volume 3 a.k.a. Al Jolson Volume III Album	Released: 1948; Label: Decca; Formats: 4 phonograph records (A-649)	1
Jolson Sings Again	Released: 1949; Label: Decca; Formats: 4 phonograph records (A-716), LP (DL 5006)	2
Al Jolson Souvenir Album, Volume 4	Released: 1949; Label: Decca; Formats: 4 phonograph records (A-712), LP (DL 5031)	—
Stephen Foster Songs	Released: 1950; Label: Decca; Formats: 4 phonograph records (A-822), LP (DL 5308)	—
Al Jolson Souvenir Album, Volume 5	Released: 1951; Label: Decca; Formats: 4 phonograph records (A-830), LP (DL 5314)	—
Al Jolson Souvenir Album, Volume 5	Released: 1951; Label: Decca; Formats: LP (DL 5315)	—
The Best of Al Jolson	Released: 1962; Label: Decca; Formats: 2 LPs (DXA 169)	40

== Singles ==
- "That Haunting Melody" / "Rum Tum Tiddle" (Victor, 1912)
- "Al Jolson / Walter J. Van Brunt – "Brass Band Ephraham Jones" / "That Society Bear" (Victor 17068, 1912)
- "Snap Your Fingers" / "I Want to Be in Dixie" (Victor 17075, 1912)
- "Movin' Man, Don't Take My Baby Grand!" / "Ragging the Baby to Sleep" (Victor, 1914)
- Billy Murray and Vaudeville Quartette / Al Jolson – "Lucia Sextette Burlesque" / "That Lovin' Traumerei" (Victor, 1912)
- "My Yellow Jacket Girl" / "The Spaniard That Blighted My Life" (Victor 17318, 1913)
- "Everybody Snap Your Fingers with Me" / "That Little German Band" (Columbia A1356, 1913)
- "You Made Me Love You" / "Pullman Porters' Parade" (Columbia, 1913)
- "Revival Day" / "Back to the Carolina You Love" (Columbia A1621, 1914)
- "Sister Susie Sewing Shirts for Soldiers" / "When the Grown Up Ladies Act like Babies" (Columbia, 1915)
- Al Jolson / Nat M. Wills – "Asleep In The Deep" / "A New Cure for Drinking" (Victor 17915, 1916)
- Al Jolson / Elmer Young – "Yaaka Hula Hickey Dula" / "The Road to Home, Sweet Home" (Columbia 2711, 1916)
- Al Jolson / Anna Chandler – "Yaska, Hoola, Hickey, Doola" / "You Can't Get Along with 'Em or Without 'Em" (Columbia, 1916)
- Al Jolson / James Harrison and James Reed – "Down Where the Swanee River Flows" / "They Made It Twice as Nice as Paradise and They Called It Dixieland" (Columbia, 1916)
- Al Jolson / M. J. O'Connell – "I Sent My Wife to the Thousand Isles" / "It's A Hundred to One You're in Love" (Columbia A2021, 1916)
- Al Jolson / Peerless Quartette – "You're a Dangerous Girl" / "On the Old Dominion Line" (Columbia, 1916)

...
