= Tamara Shayne =

Russian-born actress

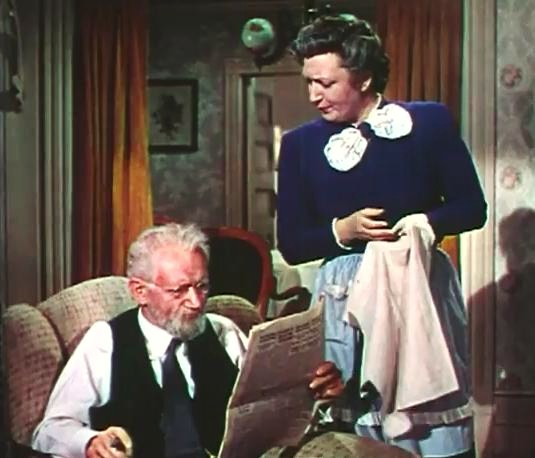
- Ludwig Donath and Tamara Shayne in Jolson Sings Again (1949)
- Born: Tamara Veniaminovna Olkenitskaya; 25 November 1902; Perm, Russian Empire
- Died: 23 October 1983 (aged 80); Los Angeles, California, U.S.
- Occupation: Actress
- Years active: 1932–1961
- Spouse: Akim Tamiroff (m. 1932; died 1972)

Tamara Shayne (born Tamara Veniaminovna Olkenitskaya; 25 November 1902 – 23 October 1983), also known as Tamara Nikoulina, was a Russian-born actress and long-time resident in the United States.

== Early life ==
Tamara Shayne was born on 25 November 1902 in Perm, Russia, to the family of a Jewish actor Veniamin Olkenitsky-Nikulin (aka Benjamin Nikulin). Her older brother Konstantin was also an actor.

== Career ==
Shayne appeared in European films before migrating to the United States in 1927 with her future husband, the actor Akim Tamiroff; the couple married in February 1933.

Her first role (uncredited) in an American film was in The Captain Hates the Sea (1934). She also appeared uncredited in Ninotchka (1939) as Anna, the cellist roommate of the titular character portrayed by Greta Garbo. Shayne appeared in nearly two dozen films from 1934-61, and is possibly best remembered as Moma Yoelson in The Jolson Story (1946) and Jolson Sings Again (1949).

== Personal life ==
Shayne remained married to Akim Tamiroff until his death in 1972, and she retired at that time. She died from complications following a heart attack on 23 October 1983.

== Filmography ==
Year	Title	Role	Notes
1934	The Captain Hates the Sea	General's Wife	Uncredited
1935	George White's 1935 Scandals	Russian Girl - Old Southern Custom	Uncredited
1939	Ninotchka	Anna - Moscow Roommate	Uncredited
1942	Somewhere I'll Find You	Mama Lugovska	Uncredited
1943	Mission to Moscow	Russian Nurse	Uncredited
1944	Song of Russia	Mme. Orlova	
1946	The Jolson Story	Mrs. Yoelson	
1947	It Happened in Brooklyn	Mrs. Kardos	
1947	Northwest Outpost	Olga Natalia's Maid	
1947	Pirates of Monterey	Filomena	
1948	Walk a Crooked Mile	Mrs. Ecko, Landlady	Uncredited
1948	The Snake Pit	Ward 33 Inmate	Uncredited
1949	Jolson Sings Again	Moma Yoelson	
1949	Black Magic	Maria Balsamo	
1949	Thieves' Highway	Parthena Garcos	
1949	The Red Danube	Helena Nagard	
1951	I Can Get It for You Wholesale	Mrs. Cooper	Uncredited
1953	Tonight We Sing	Customer	Uncredited
1955	Mr. Arkadin	Woman in Apartment	
1956	Anastasia	Zenia	Uncredited
1961	Romanoff and Juliet	Evdokia Romanoff	
