= Swanee (song) =

1919 song by George Gershwin and Irving Caesar

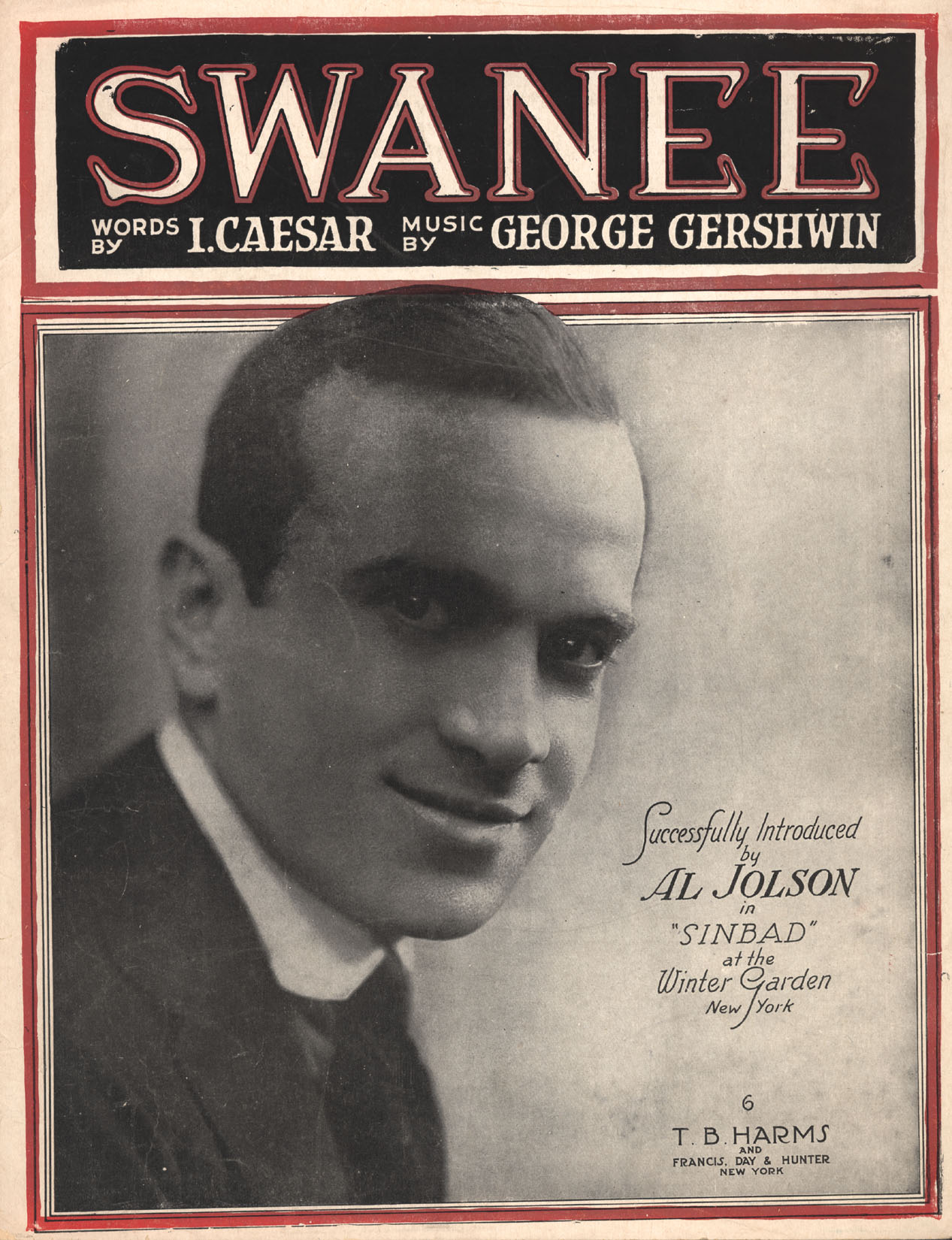
- 1919 "Swanee" sheet music with Jolson on the cover

Single by Al Jolson, "Incidental whistling by Mr. Jolson" (disc label)
- B-side: "My gal" by Frank Crumit
- Published: October 31, 1919 T. B. Harms & Francis, Day & Hunter, Inc., T.B. Harms, Inc., Warner Bros, Inc.
- Released: April 1920
- Recorded: January 9, 1920
- Studio: New York City
- Venue: Winter Garden Theatre
- Genre: Popular Music
- Length: 2.39
- Label: Columbia A-2884 Label Printing Code BW (February 1920)
- Composer: George Gershwin
- Lyricist: Irving Caesar

Swanee
Al Jolson's hit 1920 recording.

"Swanee" is an American popular song from 1919 composed by George Gershwin, with lyrics written by Irving Caesar. It is most often associated with singer Al Jolson.

The song was written for a New York City revue by Ned Wayburn called Demi Tasse, which opened on October 24, 1919 as part of the inaugural performance of the Capitol Theatre. Demi Tasse opened with "Swanee" and closed with another new song with George Gershwin's music, "Come to the Moon" (lyrics by Wayburn and Lou Paley).

Caesar, who was then aged 24, claimed to have written the song in about ten minutes riding on a bus in Manhattan, finishing it at Gershwin's apartment. It was partly inspired by Stephen Foster's "Old Folks at Home", including that phrase in its lyrics. It was originally used as a big production number, with 60 chorus girls dancing with electric lights in their slippers on an otherwise darkened stage.

== Jolson versions ==
The song had little impact in its first show, but not long afterwards Gershwin played it at a party where Al Jolson heard it. Jolson then put it into his show Sinbad, already a success at the Winter Garden Theatre, and recorded it for Columbia Records in January 1920. "After that", said Gershwin, "Swanee penetrated the four corners of the earth." The song was charted in 1920 for 18 weeks, holding the No. 1 position for nine. It sold a million sheet music copies and an estimated two million records. It became Gershwin's first hit and the biggest-selling song of his career; the money he earned from it allowed him to concentrate on theatre work and films rather than writing further single pop hits. Arthur Schwartz said: "It's ironic that he never again wrote a number equaling the sales of Swanee, which for all its infectiousness, doesn't match the individuality and subtlety of his later works."

Jolson recorded the song several times in his career and performed it in the movies Rhapsody in Blue (1945), The Jolson Story (1946), and Jolson Sings Again (1949). For the song's performance in The Jolson Story, Jolson, rather than actor Larry Parks, appeared as himself, filmed in long shot. Although usually associated with Jolson, "Swanee" has been recorded by many other singers, most notably Judy Garland in A Star Is Born.

== See also ==
- Suwannee River of southern Georgia and northern Florida.
