= Akim Tamiroff =

Armenian-American actor (1899–1972)

- Ակիմ Թամիրով
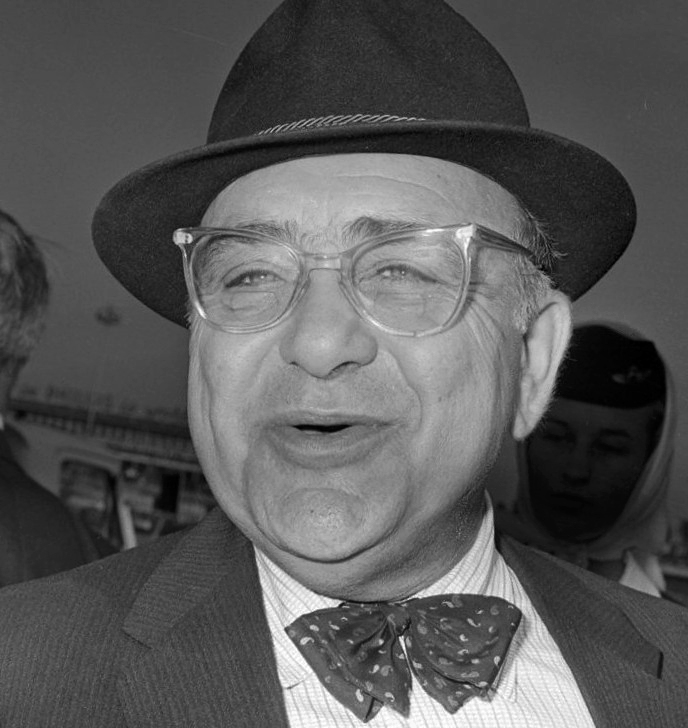
- Tamiroff in the Netherlands in 1964
- Born: Hovakim Tamiryants; October 29, 1899; Tiflis or Baku, Russian Empire
- Died: September 17, 1972 (aged 72); Palm Springs, California, U.S.
- Education: Moscow Art Theatre
- Occupation: Actor
- Years active: 1919–1972
- Spouse: Tamara Shayne (m. 1932)
- Relatives: Konstantin Shayne (brother-in-law); Benjamin Nikulin (father-in-law)

Akim Mikhailovich Tamiroff (Note: Armenian: Ակիմ Թամիրով, Russian: Аким Михайлович Тамиров) (born Hovakim Tamiryants; (Note: Armenian: Հովակիմ Թամիրյանց) October 29, 1899 – September 17, 1972) was an Armenian-American actor. One of the premier character actors of Hollywood's Golden Age, Tamiroff developed a prolific career despite his thick accent, appearing in at least 80 motion pictures over a span of 37 years.

He was nominated twice for the Academy Award for Best Supporting Actor for his performances in The General Died at Dawn (1936) and For Whom the Bell Tolls (1943), winning the first ever Golden Globe Award for Best Supporting Actor for the latter. Orson Welles, a friend and oft-collaborator, praised him as "the greatest of all screen actors."

== Early life and education ==
Tamiroff was born Hovakim Tamiryants (Armenian: Հովակիմ Թամիրյանց) to Armenian parents living in the Russian Empire. Different sources cite either Tiflis (in modern-day Georgia) or Baku (in modern-day Azerbaijan) as his places of birth. His father Mikayel Tamiryants (a.k.a. Mikhail Tamiroff) was an oil worker, and his mother Masha Amiryan was a seamstress.

He trained at the Moscow Art Theatre drama school for nine years from the age of 19, where he was a pupil of Konstantin Stanislavski. During that time, he changed his name to the russified moniker Akim Mikhailovich Tamiroff (Russian: Аким Михайлович Тамиров).

== Career ==
=== Early stage work ===
During his time at the Moscow Art Theatre, he became acquainted with fellow Armenian Nikita Balieff. Following the Russian Revolution, Tamiroff and several other émigrés joined Balieff in Paris to form the La Chauve-Souris touring revue.

He arrived in the U.S. for the first time in January 1923 on a three-month tour with the revue and starred in a repertory of Russian plays directed by Stanislavski. He returned in November and stayed until 1924. His final trip with them was in October 1927 when he decided to stay permanently. He joined the Theatre Guild in New York City, where he met his wife Tamara Shayne. Both were later naturalized as United States citizens.

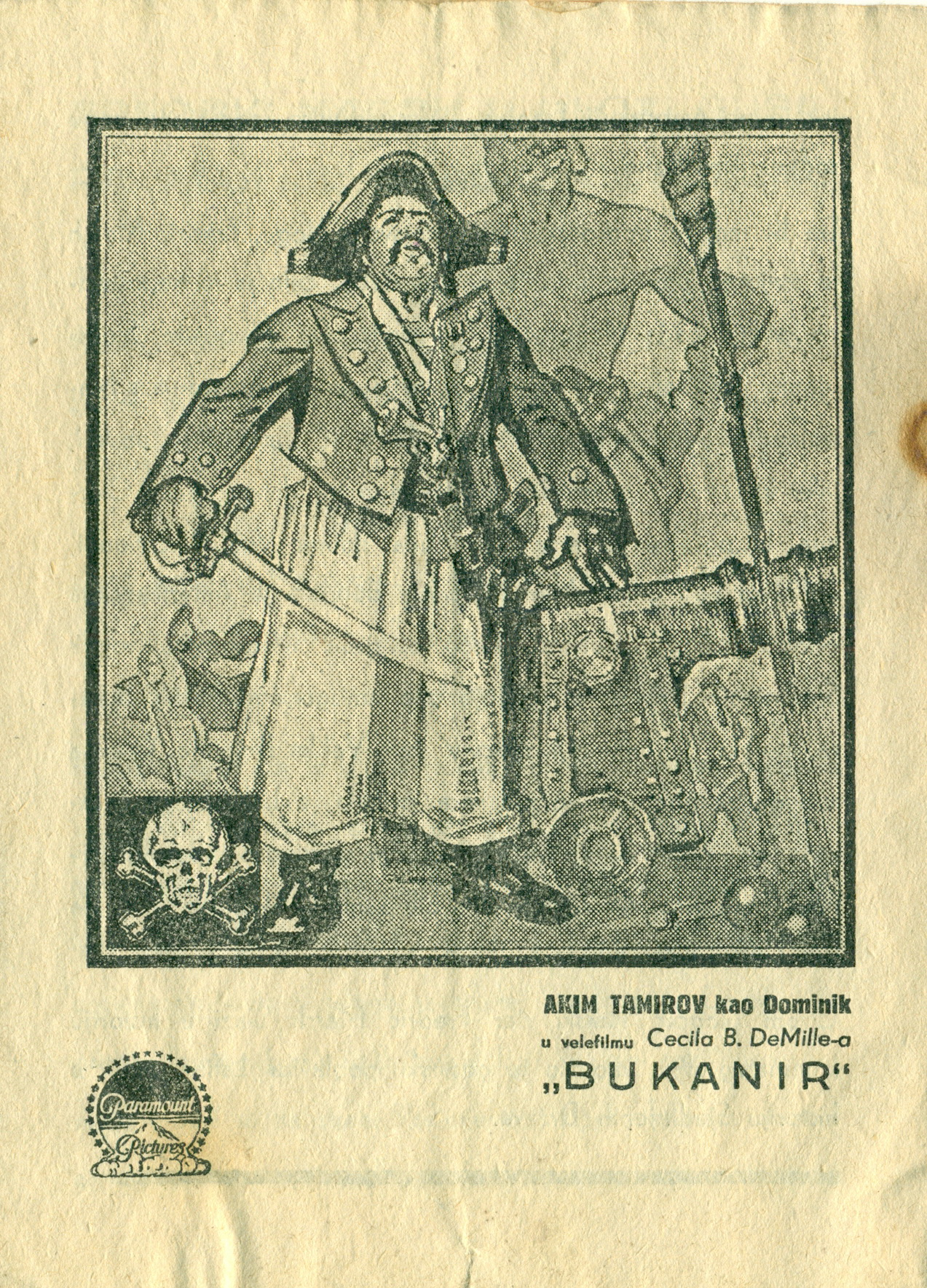
1940, Tamiroff as Dominique You on original program for movie The Buccaneer, playing in a local cinema in Prilep, Macedonia (Kingdom of Yugoslavia)

=== Hollywood career ===
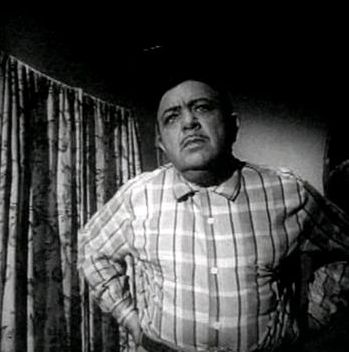
Tamiroff in Touch of Evil (1958)

Tamiroff's film debut came in 1932 in an uncredited role in Okay, America!. He performed in several more uncredited roles until 1935, when he appeared in The Lives of a Bengal Lancer. He also appeared in the lavish epic China Seas in 1935 with Clark Gable, Wallace Beery, Jean Harlow, Rosalind Russell and Robert Benchley. The following year, he was cast in the titular role in The General Died at Dawn. He appeared in the 1937 musical High, Wide, and Handsome with Irene Dunne and Randolph Scott, and the 1938 proto-noir Dangerous to Know opposite Anna May Wong, frequently singled out as his best role.

In the following decade, he appeared in such films as The Buccaneer (1938) with Fredric March, The Great McGinty (1940), The Corsican Brothers (1941), Tortilla Flat (1942) with Spencer Tracy, Hedy Lamarr and John Garfield, Five Graves to Cairo (1943) with Erich von Stroheim as Field Marshal Erwin Rommel, Frank Borzage's His Butler's Sister (1943), For Whom the Bell Tolls (1943) with Gary Cooper and Ingrid Bergman, for which he received another Oscar nomination, and Preston Sturges' The Miracle of Morgan's Creek (1944). Though ethnically Armenian, his many character roles included such ethnicities as Russian, Mexican, Chinese, Italian, French, German, Greek, Egyptian, Polish, Turkish, Malayan, Tartar, Romani, and Jewish.

His Broadway stage credits included The Life Line (1930-31), Miracle at Verdun (1931), and as the Woodcutter in Fay and Michael Kanin's adaptation of Rashomon (1950).

In 1944, Tamiroff was the first Golden Globe Award winner for Best Supporting Actor in a Motion Picture for his work in For Whom the Bell Tolls. He was twice nominated for Academy Awards, both times for Best Actor in a Supporting Role. The first was for his work in The General Died at Dawn, and the second was for his work in For Whom the Bell Tolls. Both these films starred Gary Cooper.

In later years, Tamiroff appeared in Ocean's 11 (1960) with Frank Sinatra and Dean Martin's Rat Pack, Topkapi (1964) with Peter Ustinov and Melina Mercouri, Lord Jim (1965) with Peter O’Toole and Alphaville (1965), Marquis de Sade: Justine (1969) by Jesús Franco. He also had a long collaboration with Orson Welles: including Mr Arkadin (1955), Touch of Evil (1958), The Trial (1962), and as Sancho Panza in Welles's unfinished version of Don Quixote.

== Personal life ==
Tamiroff's accepted birth year was 1899, although in at least two instances this appeared to be different. In his second trip to America in November 1923 his age is given as 27 and in the 1930 census as 32. He married fellow actress Tamara Shayne, with whom he performed nightclub acts, in February 1933 in Los Angeles. Yet, according to the above-mentioned 1930 census, the couple was living in Chicago, Illinois, as married under the (misspelled) name Tameriroff. It appears also that this was his second marriage.

Tamiroff was fluent in five languages – Armenian, Russian, English, French, and Italian.

=== Death ===
Tamiroff died in Palm Springs, California on September 17, 1972, from cancer.

== Legacy ==
For his contributions to the American film industry, Tamiroff received a star on the Hollywood Walk of Fame for motion pictures at 1634 Vine Street.

While Tamiroff may not be a household name now, his malapropistic performance as the boss in The Great McGinty is thought to have been the inspiration for the cartoon character Boris Badenov, the male half of the villainous husband-and-wife team Boris and Natasha on The Rocky and Bullwinkle Show. He was also spoofed in a 1969 episode of the TV show H.R. Pufnstuf entitled "The Stand-in" in which a frog named "Akim Toadanoff" directs a movie on Living Island. He is mentioned in J.D. Salinger's "Uncle Wiggily in Connecticut" (New Yorker, 1948), and Walker Percy's 1961 novel The Moviegoer.

== Filmography ==
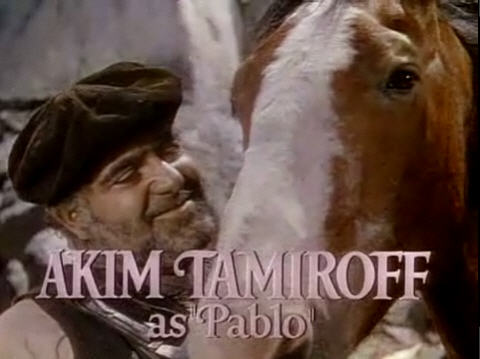
Tamiroff in the trailer for For Whom the Bell Tolls (1943)

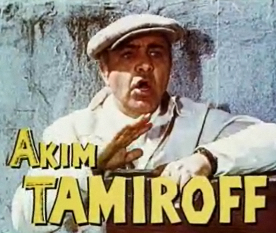
Tamiroff in the trailer for Fiesta (1947)

=== Film ===
Year	Title	Role	Notes
1932	Okay, America!	Bit Role	Uncredited
1933	Clear All Wires!	Moscow Hotel Clerk	Uncredited
1933	Gabriel Over the White House	Debt Conference Delegate	Uncredited
1933	The Barbarian	Colonel	Uncredited
1933	Professional Sweetheart	The Hotel Waiter	Uncredited
1933	Storm at Daybreak	Gypsy Fiddler	Uncredited
1933	The Devil's in Love	Adjutant	Uncredited
1933	Queen Christina	Pedro	Uncredited
1934	Fugitive Lovers	Deaf-Mute Bus Passenger	Uncredited
1934	Sadie McKee	Riccori	
1934	The Great Flirtation	Paul Wengler	
1934	Whom the Gods Destroy	Peter Korotoff	
1934	Straight Is the Way	Mr. Slavko	Uncredited
1934	Now and Forever	French Jeweller	Uncredited
1934	Chained	Pablo	
1934	The Scarlet Empress	Granin	Uncredited
1934	The Merry Widow	Maxim's Manager	Uncredited
1934	Lady by Choice	Poupolis	Uncredited
1934	The Captain Hates the Sea	Gen.Salazaro	
1934	Here is My Heart	Manager of Hotel	
1935	The Lives of a Bengal Lancer	Emir	
1935	La Veuve joyeuse	Le Turc	
1935	The Winning Ticket	Giuseppe	
1935	Rumba	Tony	Uncredited
1935	Naughty Marietta	Rudolpho	
1935	Black Fury	Sokolsky	
1935	Reckless	Chef At Wedding	Uncredited
1935	Go into Your Dance	Mexican In Cantina	
1935	Paris in Spring	Cafe Manager	
1935	China Seas	Paul Romanoff	
1935	The Gay Deception	Spellek	
1935	The Big Broadcast of 1936	Boris	
1935	Two-Fisted	Taxi Driver	
1935	The Last Outpost	Mirov	Uncredited
1936	The Story of Louis Pasteur	Dr. Zaranoff	
1936	Desire	Maj. Avilia	
1936	Woman Trap	Joe Ramirez De La Valle	
1936	Anthony Adverse	Carlo Cibo	
1936	The General Died at Dawn	General Yang	
1936	The Jungle Princess	Karen Neg	
1936	I Loved a Soldier	—N/a	Unfinished
1937	Her Husband Lies	Ed "Big Ed" Bullock	
1937	The Soldier and the Lady	Ogareff	
1937	King of Gamblers	Steve Kalkas	
1937	The Great Gambini	The Great Gambini	
1937	High, Wide, and Handsome	Joe Varese	
1937	This Way Please	Tartar Chieftain	Uncredited
1938	The Buccaneer	Dominique You	
1938	Dangerous to Know	Stephan Recka	
1938	Spawn of the North	"Red" Skain	
1938	Ride a Crooked Mile	Mike Balan	
1939	Paris Honeymoon	Mayor Peter Karloca	
1939	King of Chinatown	Frank Baturin	
1939	Union Pacific	Fiesta	
1939	The Magnificent Fraud	Jules LaCroix / President Alvarado	
1939	Honeymoon in Bali	Tony	
1939	Disputed Passage	Dr. "Tubby" Forster	
1940	The Way of All Flesh	Paul Kriza	
1940	Untamed	Joe Easter	
1940	The Great McGinty	The Boss	
1940	North West Mounted Police	Dan Duroc	
1940	Texas Rangers Ride Again	Mio Pio	
1941	New York Town	Stefan Janowski	
1941	The Corsican Brothers	Baron Colonna	
1942	Reap the Wild Wind	The Lamb (voice)	Uncredited
1942	Tortilla Flat	Pablo	
1943	Five Graves to Cairo	Farid	
1943	For Whom the Bell Tolls	Pablo	
1943	His Butler's Sister	Popoff	
1944	The Miracle of Morgan's Creek	The Boss	
1944	The Bridge of San Luis Rey	Uncle Pio	
1944	Dragon Seed	Wu Lien	
1944	Can't Help Singing	Prince Gregory Stroganovsky	
1945	Pardon My Past	Jim Arnold	
1946	A Scandal in Paris	Emile Vernet	
1947	Fiesta	Chato Vasquez	
1947	The Gangster	Nick Jammey	
1948	My Girl Tisa	Mr. Grumbach	
1948	Relentless	Joe Faringo	
1949	Outpost in Morocco	Lt. Glysko	
1949	Black Magic	Gitano	
1953	Desert Legion	Pvt. Plevko	
1954	They Who Dare	Cpt. George One	
1954	You Know What Sailors Are	The President of Agraria	
1955	Cartouche	Marchese Di Salpiere	
1955	The Widow	Carlo Serra	
1955	Mr. Arkadin	Jakob Zouk	
1956	The Black Sleep	Odo	
1956	Anastasia	Boris Andreevich Chernov	
1957	Yangtse Incident: The Story of H.M.S. Amethyst	Col. Peng	
1958	Touch of Evil	"Uncle" Joe Grandi	
1958	Me and the Colonel	Szabuniewicz	
1959	Desert Desperadoes	The Merchant	
1960	Ocean's 11	Spyros Acebos	
1961	La moglie di mio marito	Ad Agency President	
1961	The Bacchantes	Teiresias	
1961	Romanoff and Juliet	Vadim Romanoff	
1961	The Last Judgment	The Director	
1961	The Italian Brigands	'O Zingaro	
1961	Ursus and the Tartar Princess	Khan of the Tartars	
1962	Invasion 1700	Jan Onufry Zagłoba	
1962	The Reluctant Saint	Bishop Durso	
1962	The Trial	Bloch	
1962	A Queen for Caesar	Gnaeus Pompeius	
1964	The Black Tulip	Marquis de Vigogne	
1964	Panic Button	Pandowski	
1964	Topkapi	Gerven	
1964	Spuit Elf	Bakker / Brandmeester	
1965	Le bambole	Monsignor Arcudi	Segment: "Monsignor Cupido"
1965	Lord Jim	Schomberg	
1965	Crime on a Summer Morning	Frank Kramer	
1965	Alphaville	Henri Dickson	
1965	Marco the Magnificent	The Old Man of the Mountain	
1965	Marie-Chantal contre le docteur Kha	Prof. Lambaré / Dr. Kha	
1965	The Liquidator	Sheriek	
1966	Adultery Italian Style	Max Portesi	
1966	Lt. Robin Crusoe, U.S.N.	Tanamashu	
1966	Our Husbands	Cesare	Segment: "Il marito di Olga"
1966	After the Fox	Okra	
1966	Un gangster venuto da Brooklyn	Joe Montano	
1966	Hotel Paradiso	Anniello	
1967	The Vulture	Prof. Hans Koniglich	
1967	A Rose for Everyone	Basilio	
1967	Monsieur Lecoq	—N/a	Unfinished
1968	O tutto o niente	Pigsty / Dean Light	
1968	The Girl Who Couldn't Say No	Uncle Egidio	
1968	Great Catherine	Sergeant	
1969	100 Rifles	Gen. Romero	Scenes deleted
1969	Death of a Jew	Insp. Mehdaloun	
1969	Marquis de Sade: Justine	Du Harpin	
1969	The Great Bank Robbery	Papa	
1972	Don Quixote	Sancho Panza	Unfinished, filmed between 1955–69

=== Television ===
Year	Title	Role	Notes
1952	Schlitz Playhouse of Stars		Episode: "Trouble in Pier Twelve"
1955	The Best of Broadway	Nick Verdis	Episode: "Broadway"
1955	Climax!	Albert Ganz	Episode: "To Wake at Midnight"
1956	Four Star Playhouse	Mendoza	Episode: "One Forty Two"
1956	Ethel Barrymore Theatre	Pancho Villa	Episode: "This Is Villa"
1957	Playhouse 90	Mr. Anagnos	Episode: "The Miracle Worker"
1957	Producers' Showcase	General Otakar Zandek	Episode: "The Great Sebastians"
1958	DuPont Show of the Month	The Governor	Episode: "Cole Porter's 'Aladdin'"
1958	Matinee Theatre		Episode: "The Inspector General"
1958	The Rifleman	Cesar Tiffauges	Episode: "New Orleans Menace"
1959	The DuPont Show with June Allyson	Tony	Episode: "Love Is a Headache"
1960	Tales of the Vikings	Eyulf	2 episodes
1960	Johnny Ringo	Andy Baranov	Episode: "The Assassins"
1960	Westinghouse Desilu Playhouse	Captain Farago	Episode: "Thunder in the Night"
1961	Wagon Train	Joe Muharich	Episode: "The Joe Muharich Story"
1962	Route 66	Sam Benjamin	Episode: "Blues for the Left Foot"
1962	The Dick Powell Show	Inspector Boulanger	Episode: "View from the Eiffel Tower"
1962	Kraft Television Theatre	Captain Farago	Episode: "Thunder in the Night"
1962–63	Naked City	Emil Pappas / Demetru Lapesku	2 episodes
1963	The Defenders	John Solasky	Episode: "The Trial of Twenty-Two"
1963	Breaking Point	Goldstein	Episode: "A Pelican in the Wilderness"
1966	The Man from U.N.C.L.E.	Chairman Georgi Koz	Episode: "The Jingle Bells Affair"
1969	Then Came Bronson	"Papa Bear"	Episode: "Pilot"

==== TV films, miniseries, and specials ====
Year	Title	Role
1954	The Black Forest	Baron Von Moribund
1955	The Chocolate Soldier	Major Ludek

== Awards and nominations ==
Institution	Year	Category	Work	Result	Ref.
Academy Awards	1937	Best Supporting Actor	The General Died at Dawn	Nominated	
Academy Awards	1944	Best Supporting Actor	For Whom the Bell Tolls	Nominated	
Golden Globe Awards	1944	Best Supporting Actor – Motion Picture	For Whom the Bell Tolls	Won	
