= Haldane Douglas =

American art director

- Born: August 13, 1893; Pittsburgh, Pennsylvania
- Died: May 26, 1980 (aged 87); Orange County, California
- Occupation: Art director
- Years active: 1938-1947

Haldane Douglas (August 13, 1893 – May 26, 1980) was an American art director, painter, etcher, muralist and architect. He was nominated an Academy Award in the category Best Art Direction for the film For Whom the Bell Tolls. He was born in Pittsburgh, Pennsylvania and died in Orange County, California.

== Selected filmography ==
- For Whom the Bell Tolls (1943)
