= Konstantin Shayne =

Russian actor (1888–1974)

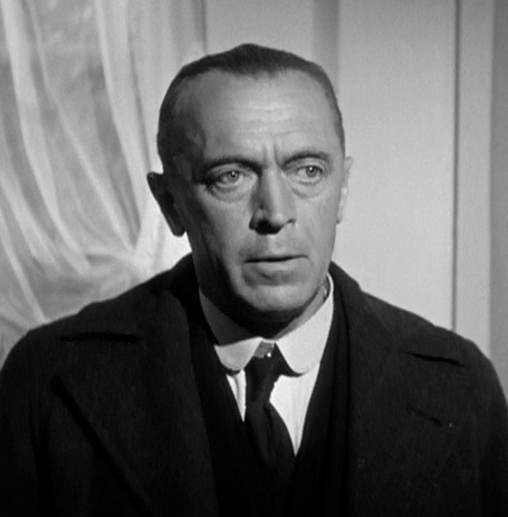
- Shayne in The Stranger (1946)
- Born: Konstantin Veniaminovich Olkenitski; November 29, 1888; Kharkov, Kharkov Governorate, Russian Empire (modern Kharkiv, Ukraine)
- Died: November 15, 1974 (aged 85); Los Angeles, California, U.S.
- Occupation: Actor
- Years active: 1938–65
- Spouses: Olga Valierievna Korbut Dashkevitch (m. 1934; died 1941) Marjorie Pearl Harris (m. 1944)
- Children: 4
- Family: Tamara Shayne (sister)

Konstantin Shayne (born Konstantin Veniaminovich Olkenitski; Russian: Константин Вениаминович Олькеницкий, November 29, 1888 – November 15, 1974) was a Russian-American actor.

== Biography ==
Shayne was born in Kharkov, Russian Empire (now Kharkiv, Ukraine) to the family of Veniamin Olkenitsky-Nikulin, a Jewish actor. His siblings were actress Tamara Shayne and writers Lev and Yuriy Nikulin.

World War I intervened before he could join the Moscow Arts Theatre, and during the conflict he fought with General Wrangel and the White Armies. Shayne was married two times and he also had children.

Shayne emigrated to the United States in 1928, travelling as a second-class passenger on board the S/S Berengaria, which arrived at the Port of New York on September 14, 1928. He was listed as Konstantin Schein, an artist residing in Berlin, Germany.

As an actor, Shayne performed in movies such as None but the Lonely Heart (1944) and The Stranger (1946), starring (and directed by) Orson Welles. He performed in The Secret Life of Walter Mitty (1947), which featured Danny Kaye in the lead role. His performance in For Whom the Bell Tolls (1943) was cut from the final release.

In his penultimate film appearance Shayne dominates two minutes of Alfred Hitchcock's Vertigo (1958), playing the old bookseller Pop Leibel.

== Filmography ==
=== Film ===
Year	Title	Role	Notes
1938	Bulldog Drummond in Africa	Plane Saboteur	Uncredited
1938	King of Alcatraz	Murok	
1939	Paris Honeymoon	Hotel Porter	Uncredited
1939	On Your Toes	First Assassin	Uncredited
1939	Charlie McCarthy, Detective	Headwaiter	Uncredited
1943	Mission to Moscow	Nokollai Bukharin	Uncredited
1943	Five Graves to Cairo	Major von Buelow	Uncredited
1943	For Whom the Bell Tolls	Karkov	Uncredited (deleted scenes)
1944	Song of Russia	Wounded Soldier	
1944	Passage to Marseille	1st Mate	Uncredited
1944	The Seventh Cross	Feullgrabe	
1944	Till We Meet Again	Major Krupp	
1944	None but the Lonely Heart	Ike Weber	
1944	The Falcon in Hollywood	Alec Hoffman	
1945	The Man in Half Moon Street	Dr. B.A. Vishanoff	Uncredited
1945	Escape in the Fog	Schiller	
1945	Her Highness and the Bellboy	Yanos von Lankofitz	
1946	The Stranger	Konrad Meinike	
1946	Dangerous Millions	Professor Jan Schuyler	
1947	The Secret Life of Walter Mitty	Peter von Hoorn	
1947	Song of Love	Reinecke	
1947	Christmas Eve	Gustav Reichman	
1948	To the Victor	Pablo	
1948	Night Wind	Dr. Ulding	
1948	Cry of the City	Dr. Veroff	Uncredited
1948	Angel on the Amazon	Dr. Jungmeyer	
1950	The Red Danube	Professor Serge Bruloff	
1951	I Was a Communist for the FBI	Gerhardt Eisler	
1951	The Unknown Man	Peter Hulderman	
1952	Diplomatic Courier	Austrian Train Conductor	Uncredited
1952	5 Fingers	Proprietor	Uncredited
1953	Treasure of the Golden Condor	Father Benoit	
1954	Rhapsody	Professor Kelber	Uncredited
1956	The Price of Fear	Bolasny	
1958	Vertigo	Pop Leibel	
1965	Joy in the Morning	Mr. Hoffman	Uncredited, (final film role)

=== Select TV series ===
- Mr. & Mrs. North (1 episode, 1952) – Andre Stulik
- Alfred Hitchcock Presents (1956) (Season 1 Episode 21: "Safe Conduct") – Customs Officer Trevitch
- Alfred Hitchcock Presents (1958) (Season 3 Episode 25: ""Flight to the East") – Abdul Ismael
- The Outer Limits (2 episodes, 1963–1964) – Murdock – The Gardener / Dr. Philip Fletcher
- The Rogues (1 episode, 1965) – Commandant
