= Okay, America! =

1932 film

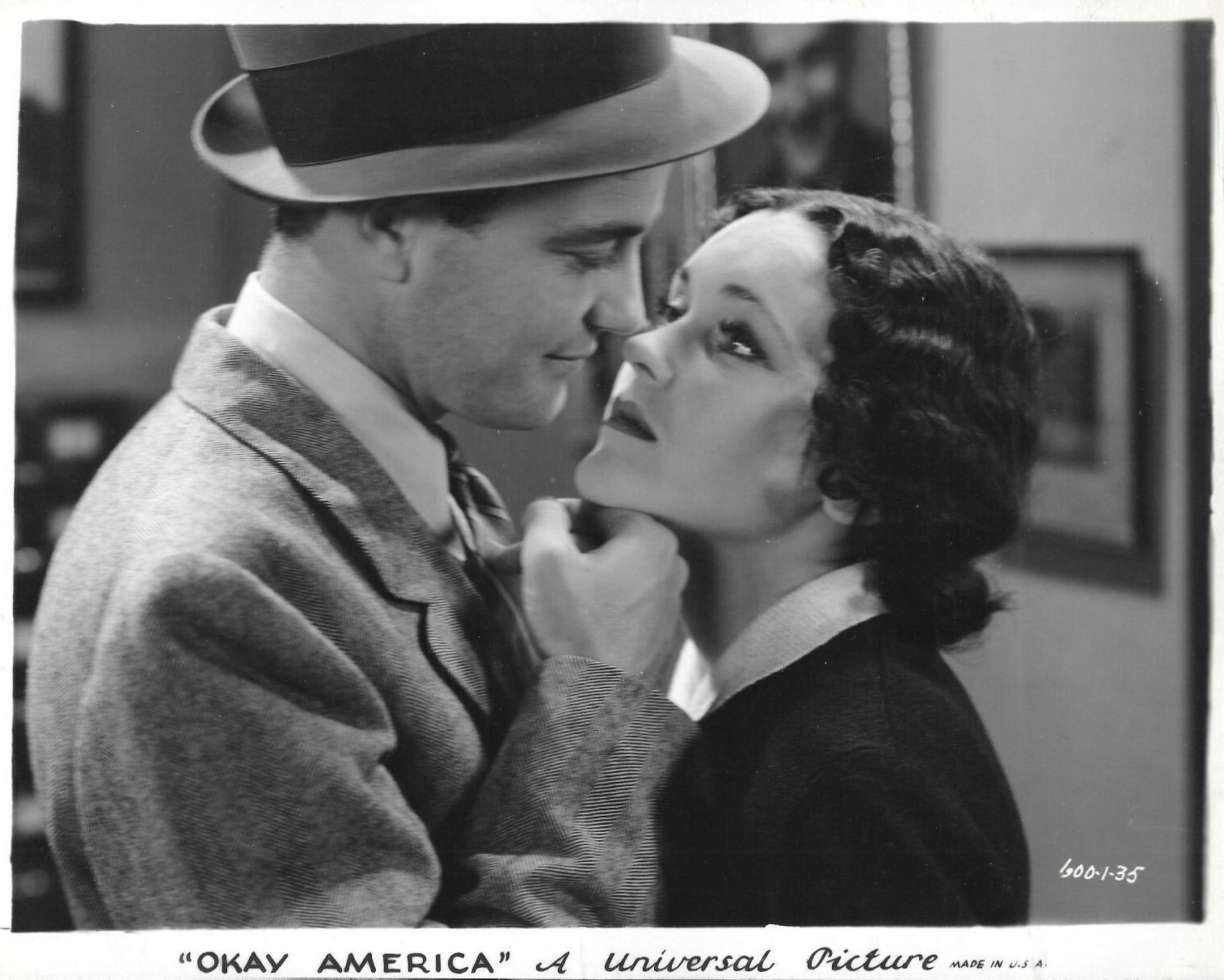
- Lew Ayres and Maureen O'Sullivan
- Directed by: Tay Garnett
- Written by: William Anthony McGuire; Scott Pembroke
- Produced by: Carl Laemmle, Jr.
- Starring: Lew Ayres; Maureen O'Sullivan; Louis Calhern; Edward Arnold; Akim Tamiroff
- Cinematography: William H. Daniels
- Edited by: Arthur Charles Miller
- Music by: Alfred Newman
- Distributed by: Universal Pictures
- Release date: September 8, 1932
- Running time: 78 minutes
- Country: United States
- Language: English

Okay, America! (sometimes referred to as Okay America) is a 1932 American Pre-Code film, about a gossip columnist's rise to fame, based closely on the real life of Walter Winchell. Directed by Tay Garnett, the film stars Lew Ayres and Maureen O'Sullivan.

== Plot ==
Larry Wayne is gossip columnist for a New York newspaper, Daily Blade, and he also is the host of a radio program called "Okay, America". When Ruth Drake, the daughter of wealthy politician, is kidnapped, Jones, the chief editor of the Daily Blade chooses Wayne to cover the story.

Following up on a hot tip from former reporter Joe Morton, now a drunken neighborhood derelict, Jimmy meets with the supposedly retired racketeer "Mileaway" Russell, who nearly kills Larry when he presses him for his connection to the Drake disappearance. Mileaway relates to the reporter that he kidnapped Ruth Drake after her speed boat, which Mileaway mistakenly thought was a police boat, forced him to dump $100,000 worth of "uncut stuff" into the water. He wants the ransom to pay for his lost earnings. After Larry hands over the money at the assigned time, Ruth cannot be found at the designated location, and Larry finds a note reading, "It can't be done." Having alerted the police and his readers of the imminent release of the girl, Mileaway's double-cross causes Larry considerable embarrassment when his headline goes stale. His managing editor does not believe his story either. Kidnapped by Mileaway's men, Larry is introduced to the big boss, "Duke" Morgan. Knowing that John Drake, the abducted girl's father, is close to the President, Morgan instructs Larry to relay a message through Drake to the country's chief executive. Morgan's orders are that all criminal charges against him must be dropped and a pending two-year prison sentence be reduced to win the girl's release. At a meeting with the President in Washington, D.C., Larry is told that the government cannot and will not make deals with criminals. However, Larry successfully bluffs Morgan into thinking his terms have been met. After Morgan releases Ruth, Larry shoots Morgan in his hotel room as his gang of racketeers are loudly celebrating a false victory in the ante room, unaware of their boss's death. Larry exits the building, satisfied that he has rid the world of at least one criminal. During his next broadcast, however, Larry is killed by one of Mileaway's men as revenge for Morgan's death, much to Maureen's horror as she listens through the radio.

== Cast ==
- Lew Ayres as Larry Wayne
- Maureen O'Sullivan as Sheila Barton
- Louis Calhern as Mileaway Russell
- Edward Arnold as Duke Morgan
- Walter Catlett as City Editor aka 'Lucille'
- Alan Dinehart as Roger Jones
- Henry Armetta as Sam
- Emerson Treacy as Jerry Robbins
- Marjorie Gateson as Mrs. Herbert Wright
- Margaret Lindsay as Ruth Drake
- Akim Tamiroff as Bit role (uncredited)
