= When I Leave the World Behind =

Single by Sam Ash
- B-side: "When the Lusitania Went Down" by Herbert Stuart
- Released: 1915
- Label: Columbia
- Songwriter: Irving Berlin

"When I Leave the World Behind"

Song by Al Jolson

from the album Al Jolson, Volume 3
- Released: 1948
- Songwriter: Irving Berlin

"When I Leave the World Behind" is a song written by Irving Berlin and popularized by Sam Ash, Henry Burr, and Al Jolson.

== Composition ==
In the words of Don Tyler and his book Music of the First World War, it is a song "about a man facing his own mortality and the legacy he hope[s] to leave behind". It was based on the will of a lawyer named Charles Lounsberry, who bequeathed to his children "exclusively the dandelion of the field and the daisies thereof, with the right to play among them freely, according to the custom of children." There were more clauses likewise sentimental. Only after the song became a hit, he was found to have been a hoax.
