= Song of Russia =

1944 film

- Theatrical Film Poster
- Directed by: Gregory Ratoff; László Benedek (uncredited)
- Written by: Leo Mittler (story); Victor Trivas (story); Guy Endore (story); Paul Jarrico (screenplay); Richard Collins (screenplay)
- Produced by: Joe Pasternak; Pandro S. Berman
- Starring: Robert Taylor; Susan Peters; Robert Benchley
- Cinematography: Harry Stradling Sr.
- Edited by: George Hively; George Boemler
- Distributed by: Metro-Goldwyn-Mayer
- Release date: February 10, 1944
- Running time: 107 minutes
- Country: United States
- Language: English
- Budget: $1,828,000
- Box office: $3,729,000

Song of Russia is a 1944 American war film made and distributed by Metro-Goldwyn-Mayer. The picture was credited as being directed by Gregory Ratoff, though Ratoff became ill near the end of the five-month production and was replaced by László Benedek, who completed principal photography; the credited screenwriters were Paul Jarrico and Richard J. Collins. The film stars Robert Taylor, Susan Peters, and Robert Benchley.

Most of the score is adaptations of Tchaikovsky compositions by Herbert Stothart. Jerome Kern and Yip Harburg contributed the song "And Russia Is Her Name".

== Plot ==
American orchestra conductor John Meredith and his manager, Hank Higgins, travel to the Soviet Union shortly before the country is invaded by Germany. Meredith falls in love with beautiful Soviet pianist Nadya Stepanova while they tour the country on a 40-city tour. Their bliss is destroyed by the German invasion.

== Cast ==
- Robert Taylor as John Meredith
- Susan Peters as Nadya Stepanova
- John Hodiak as Boris Bulganov
- Robert Benchley as Hank Higgins
- Felix Bressart as Petrov
- Michael Chekhov as Ivan Stepanov
- Darryl Hickman as Peter Bulganov
- Jacqueline White as Anna Bulganov
- Patricia Prest as Stasa Bulganov
- Joan Lorring as Sonia
- Vladimir Sokoloff as Alexander Meschkov
- Leo Mostovoy as Yanovich
- Leo Bulgakov as Professor Faber
- Zola Karabanova as Natasha Bulganov
- Konstantin Shayne as Wounded Soldier
- John Wengraf as Red Army Commander
- Barbara Bulgakov as Truck Driver
- Tamara Shayne as Mme. Orlova
- Mariana Fiory as Nina

== Production ==
Metro-Goldwyn-Mayer rapidly greenlit a war film set in the Soviet Union in 1942 after the United States Office of War Information encouraged films positively portraying the Allied Powers and in order to beat competing studios with similar ideas. The Soviet Government agreed to assist the film production in exchange for blocking "White or Anti-Soviet Russian" influence on the film. In October 1942, Russian-born director Gregory Ratoff discussed the project further with Soviet Ambassador to the United States Andrei Gromyko.

Anna Louise Strong, David Hertz, Guy Trosper, and Michael Blankfort each worked on drafts of the screenplay before the final version was written by Paul Jarrico and Richard Collins. The U.S. government later pressured MGM to have Boris Ingster rewrite the screenplay further to downplay the film's Stalinist tones. Kathryn Grayson, Hedy Lamarr, Barbara Pearson, Signe Hasso, Donna Reed, and Greta Garbo were all considered for the role of Nadya with Garbo preferred before Susan Peters was cast in the role. Walter Pidgeon and Margaret O'Brien were originally cast as John and Sasha. Elliott Sullivan and Jean Rogers also auditioned for roles in the film, while Keenan Wynn and Morris Ankrum were hired but recast.

Principal photography began on the film on March 11, 1943, and continued until late May, resuming again in June and July. Reshoots occurred in December 1943. The film was shot in California, with Rancho Park Golf Course and Sierra Mountains used as locations. On June 29, 1943, Ratoff collapsed during filming, forcing László Benedek to step in as director for the rest of principal photography. Additionally Marvin Stuart had to become assistant director after Roland Asher joined the Royal Air Force, George Hively replaced George Boemler as editor.

== Perception as pro-Soviet propaganda ==
The positive portrayal of the Soviet Union in the film is clearly linked to the wartime alliance of the Soviet Union and the U.S.

After the end of the Second World War and the outbreak of the Cold War, the House Un-American Activities Committee (HUAC) cited Song of Russia as one of the three noted examples of "pro-Soviet propaganda films" made by Hollywood, the others being Warner Bros.' Mission to Moscow and RKO's The North Star. This assertion was supported by the Russian-American pro-capitalist and anti-Communist writer Ayn Rand, who was specifically asked by a HUAC investigator to see the film and provide an expert opinion on it. Ayn Rand, in her 1947 testimony before the HUAC, cited Song of Russia as an example of Communist propaganda in the Hollywood motion picture-industry, depicting a romanticized Soviet Union with a degree of freedom and comfort that, in her opinion, did not exist in the real Soviet Union.

Robert Taylor himself protested, after the fact, that he had had to make the film under duress, as he was under contract to MGM. Specifically, he claimed that the War Production Board threatened to block his commission to the United States Navy unless he appeared in the film. This is the rationale he used to explain why he was a friendly witness during the HUAC hearings in the 1950s. Russian-born director Ratoff testified that Taylor was telling the truth and that Taylor had explicitly protested about the aforementioned nonrealistic aspect of the film but had been told by MGM to "just do the picture" or else he would be liable for breach of contract.

== Reception ==
Despite the criticism it received in later years, historians claiming it is nowadays more remembered for its content rather than its quality, Song of Russia was initially received positively. The New York Times called some scenes "a fine bit of cinematic art". Furthermore, the reviewer praised the cast, writing:

"Taylor makes a very good impression as a young American caught in Russia by love and war. And Susan Peters is extraordinarily winning as a mentally solemn but emotionally bonny Russian girl. Robert Benchley throws some straws of cryptic humor into the wind as the American's manager, and Michael Chekhov, Vladimir Sokoloff and Michael Dalmatov are superb as genial Russian characters."

Big Spring Daily Herald called Taylor and Peters "the most dynamic new romantic team since Clark Gable was paired with Lana Turner".

=== Box office ===
The movie was also popular, earning $1,845,000 in the US and Canada and $1,884,000 elsewhere resulting in a profit of $782,000.
