= The North Star (1943 film) =

1943 film by Lewis Milestone

- Theatrical poster
- Directed by: Lewis Milestone
- Written by: Lillian Hellman (story and screenplay)
- Produced by: Samuel Goldwyn; William Cameron Menzies
- Starring: Anne Baxter; Dana Andrews; Walter Huston; Walter Brennan; Ann Harding; Jane Withers; Farley Granger; Erich von Stroheim
- Cinematography: James Wong Howe
- Edited by: Daniel Mandell
- Music by: Aaron Copland
- Production company: Samuel Goldwyn Productions
- Distributed by: RKO Radio Pictures
- Release date: November 4, 1943
- Running time: 106 minutes
- Country: United States
- Language: English
- Box office: $2.8 million (US rentals)

The North Star (also known as Armored Attack in the US) is a 1943 American war film starring Anne Baxter, Dana Andrews, Walter Huston, Walter Brennan and Erich von Stroheim. It was produced by Samuel Goldwyn Productions and distributed by RKO Radio Pictures. It was directed by Lewis Milestone, written by Lillian Hellman and featured production design by William Cameron Menzies. The music was written by Aaron Copland, the lyrics by Ira Gershwin, and the cinematography by James Wong Howe. The film also marked the debut of Farley Granger.

The film is about the resistance of Ukrainian villagers, through guerrilla tactics, against the German invaders of the Ukrainian SSR. The film is considered to be pro-Soviet propaganda at the height of the war. It was well-received, and nominated for six Academy Awards.

In the Cold War of the 1950s The North Star was criticized for its sympathetic portrayal of the Soviet Union and use of Soviet propaganda. The film was re-edited to deemphasize its idealized portrayal of Soviet collective farms at the beginning and to include references to the Hungarian Uprising of 1956 against Soviet rule. The film was then retitled Armored Attack and released to American theaters.

== Plot ==
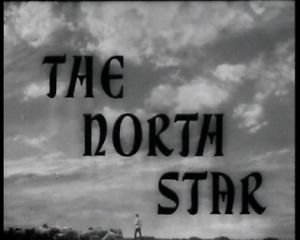
Title card

In June 1941, Ukrainian villagers are living in peace. As the school year ends, a group of friends decide to travel to Kiev for a holiday. To their horror, they find themselves attacked by German aircraft, part of the Nazi invasion of the Soviet Union. Eventually their village itself is occupied by the Nazis. Meanwhile, men and women take to the hills to form partisan militias.

The full brutality of the Nazis is revealed when the Germans send Dr. von Harden to use the village children as a source of blood for transfusions into wounded German soldiers. Some children lose so much blood that they die. When Dr. Pavel Kurin, a famous Ukrainian doctor, discovers this and informs the partisans, they prepare to strike back. They launch a cavalry assault on the village to rescue their families. Kurin accuses von Harden of being worse than the ardent Nazis, because he has used his skills to support them. Kurin then shoots the doctor. The peasants join together, and one girl envisions a future in which they will "make a free world for all men".

== Cast ==
- Anne Baxter as Marina Pavlova
- Dana Andrews as Kolya Simonov
- Walter Huston as Dr. Pavel Grigorich Kurin
- Walter Brennan as Karp
- Ann Harding as Sophia Pavlova
- Jane Withers as Clavdia Kurina
- Farley Granger as Damian Simonov
- Erich von Stroheim as Dr. von Harden
- Dean Jagger as Rodion Pavlov
- Carl Benton Reid as Boris Stepanich Simonov
- Esther Dale as Anna
- Paul Guilfoyle as Iakin
- Tonio Selwart as German Captain
- Gene O'Donnell as Russian Pilot
- Frank Wilcox as Petrov
- Lynn Winthrop as Guerilla Girl
- Eric Roberts as Grisha
- Ann Carter as Olga Pavlova
- Ruth Nelson as Nadya Simonova
- Martin Kosleck as Dr. Richter
- Peter Pohlenz as German Lieutenant
- Robert Lowery as Russian gunner
- Loudie Claar as Woman on Hospital Cot
- Charles Bates as Patya
- Grace Cunard as farmer's wife
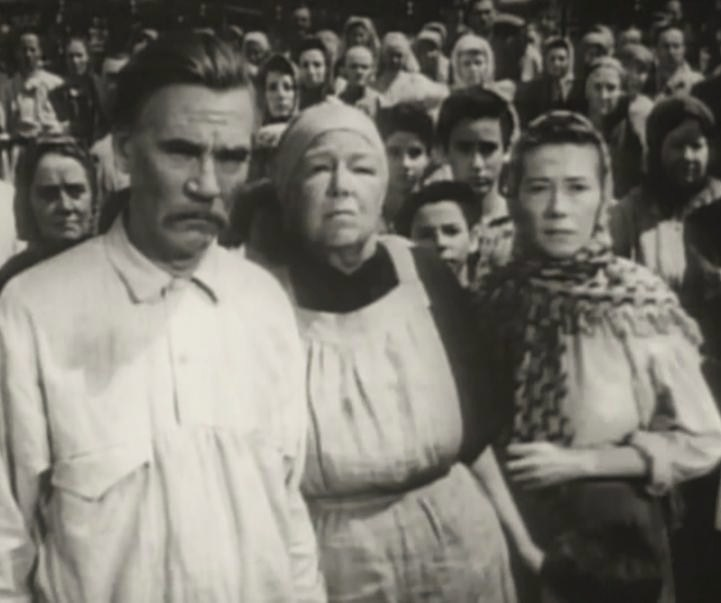
Walter Huston, Esther Dale and Ruth Nelson

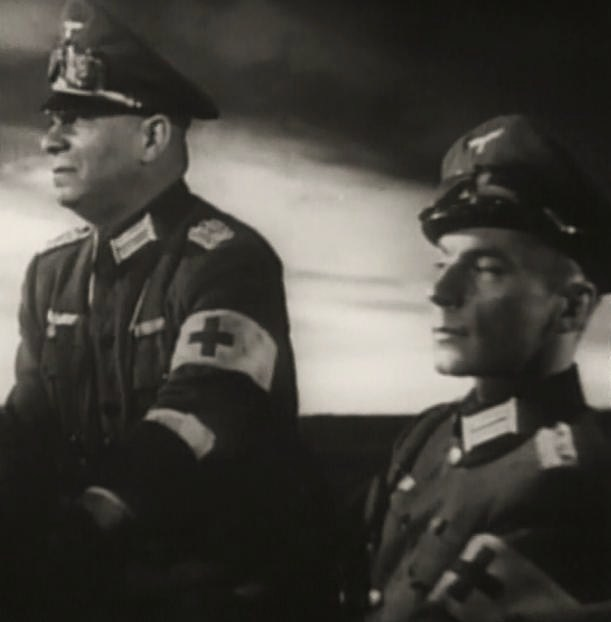
Erich von Stroheim and Martin Kosleck

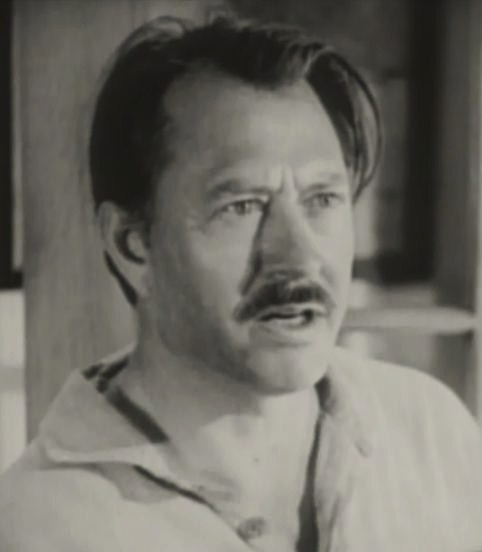
Carl Benton Reid

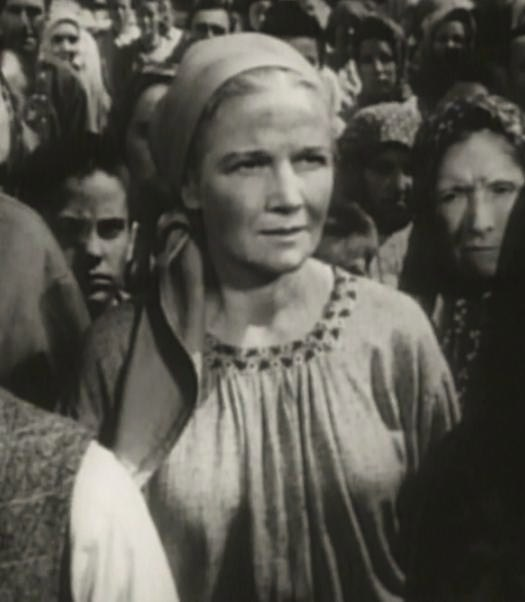
Ann Harding

== Criticism ==
The House Committee on Un-American Activities would later cite The North Star as one of the three noted examples of pro-Soviet works made by Hollywood, the other two being Warner Brothers' Mission to Moscow (1943) and MGM's Song of Russia (1944). Similar U.S. World War II movies are RKO Radio Pictures's Days of Glory on Russian resistance in the Tula Oblast and MGM's Dragon Seed on Chinese efforts against the Japanese occupation.

The extent to which the film incorporated official Soviet propaganda about collective farms prompted British author Robert Conquest to explain how write how the manner the film ignored the harsh living conditions under Soviet collectivization was "a travesty".

== Recut ==
The film was re-released in 1957 under the title Armored Attack. This edited version eliminates scenes about collectivized farming, and opens with the entry of a German column marching into a village and concludes with narration praising the Hungarian Uprising of 1956. This version of the film was released as a double feature together with Fred Zinnemann's The Men (1950) renamed to Battle Stripe.

In later years, the original version was made available on home video restoring segments removed for the 1957 re-release.

== Awards ==
The film was nominated for six Academy Awards:

- Art Direction (Black-and-White) (Perry Ferguson, Howard Bristol)
- Cinematography (Black-and-White) (James Wong Howe)
- Music (Music Score of a Dramatic or Comedy Picture) (Aaron Copland)
- Sound Recording (Thomas T. Moulton)
- Special Effects (Clarence Slifer, Ray Binger, Thomas T. Moulton)
- Writing (Original Screenplay) (Lillian Hellman)
