= Richard Collins (screenwriter) =

American screenwriter and producer (1914-2013)

Richard J. Collins (July 20, 1914 – February 14, 2013) was an American screenwriter and producer. His writing credits included the controversial World War II propaganda film, Song of Russia. He was blacklisted starting in 1947 after the House Un-American Activities Committee (HUAC) identified him as a Communist in the motion picture industry.

In 1951, Collins chose to cooperate with the HUAC and "name names", and was allowed to resume his career. He went on to write and produce many television programs, including Bonanza, General Electric Theater, Bob Hope Presents the Chrysler Theatre, Remington Steele, and Matlock. His earlier marriage to blacklisted actress Dorothy Comingore, their publicized child custody battle, and their differing responses to the HUAC, were dramatized in the 1991 film Guilty by Suspicion.

== Background ==
Richard Collins was born in New York City into an affluent Jewish household. His father Harry Collins was a noted fashion designer who provided clothing for the Vanderbilts, Astors, and other prominent families. Richard went to various schools in New York City, Paris, and Los Angeles, including the Browning School, Lycée Janson-de-Sailly, and Beverly Hills High School. He graduated from the latter school in 1932. He attended Stanford University for one year, where he befriended future screenwriters Budd Schulberg and Maurice Rapf, before dropping out.

== Career ==
In 1935, Collins settled in Los Angeles. He worked at Bloomingdale's while looking for a way into the film industry. With help from Budd Schulberg's father, Hollywood studio executive and producer B. P. Schulberg, Collins was hired as a script reader at Columbia Pictures. From 1936-37, he was a junior writer at 20th Century Fox.

Collins was meanwhile moving to the left politically. In 1936 he temporarily returned to New York to write for the New Theatre League, which was linked to the Young Communist League (YCL). He then became active in the Hollywood branch of the Communist Party USA (CPUSA).

Collins wrote or co-wrote numerous screenplays in the late 1930s and '40s, including some such as Song of Russia (1944) that would subsequently get him in trouble with the HUAC. In 1939 he married actress Dorothy Comingore. They had two children before divorcing in 1946.

=== HUAC and the blacklist controversy ===
In September 1947, Collins was subpoenaed as one of the "Hollywood Nineteen", the initial group of film artists targeted by the HUAC for injecting Communist propaganda into Hollywood movies. Of the nineteen, only ten (the "Hollywood Ten") and Bertolt Brecht were called to testify. Collins later said he agreed with the Hollywood Ten's refusal to tell the HUAC whether they were CPUSA members.

As a result of his "Hollywood Nineteen" association, Collins was blacklisted for nearly four years. After previously earning $1500 a week at Warner Bros., his income plummeted. He tried unsuccessfully to start a business making patterns for ladies' dresses; he obtained a few "under the table" writing assignments but acknowledged in a 1975 interview, "I didn't really do well during those years." He decided in early 1951 to recant and testify before the HUAC as a friendly witness. By this time, his politics had taken an anti-Communist turn.

He appeared before the HUAC on April 12, 1951. He was represented by entertainment lawyer Martin Gang. Collins spoke of his former membership in the CPUSA, Hollywood Anti-Nazi League, Hollywood Writers' Mobilization, Joint Anti-Fascist Refugee Committee (JAFRC), and the Progressive Citizens of America (PCA). He confessed to his heavy involvement in the Communist movement in the 1930s and '40s, attending as many as four to five meetings a week. But he added that he no longer followed Party doctrine, and that he stopped paying CPUSA dues in 1947.

When asked why he was cooperating with the Committee in 1951, after admitting that he would have been an unfriendly witness if called to testify in 1947, Collins replied:

It would be because at that time it seemed to me that purely on American democratic constitutional grounds there was a question of the propriety of asking a man his political beliefs. Without going into the question of its propriety today, there has been a marked change in the world situation since 1947, and there has been as great a change in me. It is hard to tell where one thing begins and the other ends.

In total, Collins named 26 of his colleagues as Communists, including former friends Budd Schulberg and Paul Jarrico. Many Hollywood figures, including Jarrico, never spoke to Collins again.

Blacklisted director Joseph Losey recounted in a 1985 interview that after Dorothy Comingore heard her ex-husband testify on the radio, she was so distraught she cut off her hair: "I suddenly realized I was married to an informer," she told Losey. In 1952, Collins and Comingore became embroiled in a bitter and highly publicized child custody lawsuit. He accused her of being an alcoholic and an unfit mother. She claimed her refusal to cooperate with the HUAC had caused her to be vilified. Collins ended up winning the lawsuit and took custody of their son and daughter. The emotional strain of this experience was depicted in the film Guilty by Suspicion (1991), with Comingore portrayed by Patricia Wettig as Dorothy Nolan, and Collins portrayed by Chris Cooper as Larry Nolan.

=== Later career ===
After clearing himself with the HUAC, Collins' first screen credit was for the 1953 Don Siegel-directed film China Venture. Collins was hired by producer Walter Wanger to write The Adventures of Hajji Baba and Riot in Cell Block 11 (the latter also directed by Siegel). Collins wrote an early treatment for the Wanger-produced and Siegel-directed Invasion of the Body Snatchers (1956), but was not credited on the finished film. His last screenwriting credits on feature films were for Spanish Affair (1957), The Badlanders (1958), and Pay or Die (1960).

In the 1960s, Collins began working almost exclusively in television. He wrote episodes for numerous shows including Bat Masterson, Route 66, The Untouchables, General Electric Theater, 87th Precinct, Cheyenne, and Daniel Boone. He obtained his first producer credits in 1963 for Breaking Point. He went on to produce over 120 episodes of Bonanza between 1968 to 1973. In 1976, he was executive producer of the short-lived Western series Sara. Starting in 1986, he produced 108 episodes of Matlock before retiring in 1992.

== Death ==
On February 14, 2013, Richard Collins died in Ventura, California at age 98. He had been under hospice care after contracting aspiration pneumonia. He was survived by his son Michael and daughter Judith.

== Screenplay credits (incomplete) ==
- 1939: Rulers of the Sea (story and screenplay credit shared with Frank Cavett and Talbot Jennings)
- 1940: One Crowded Night (co-written with Arnaud d'Usseau)
- 1941: Lady Scarface (co-written with Arnaud d'Usseau)
- 1943: Thousands Cheer (co-written with Paul Jarrico)
- 1944: Song of Russia (co-written with Paul Jarrico)
- 1946: Little Giant (story credit shared with Paul Jarrico)
