= Al Jolson, Volume 3 =

Studio album by Al Jolson
- Released: 1948
- Label: Decca

Al Jolson chronology
Al Jolson Souvenir Album (1947)	Al Jolson, Volume 3 (1948)	Jolson Sings Again (1949)

Al Jolson, Volume 3 (also known as Al Jolson, Volume Three, Al Jolson – Volume 3, and Al Jolson Volume III Album) is a studio album recorded by Al Jolson for Decca. It was released in 1948 as a set of four 78-rpm phonograph records (catalog no. 649).

== Content ==
On this album, Jolson is accompanied by an orchestra directed by Morris Stoloff.

== Release ==
The album was originally released as a set of four 10-inch 78-rpm phonograph records (cat. no. A-649).

== Reception ==
The album spent multiple weeks at number one on Billboard's Best-Selling Popular Record Albums chart.

== 33-rpm and 45-rpm re-releases ==
Later, the album was made available on 33 rpm (one 10-inch LP, cat. no. DL 5030) and 45 rpm (a set of four 7-inch records, cat. no. 9-158).

== Track listing ==
Set of four 10-inch 78-rpm records (Decca A-649)

Side 1
No.	Title	Writer(s)	Note(s)	Length
1.	"I Want a Girl (Just Like the Girl That Married Dear Old Dad)"	Harry Von Tilzer—William Dillon	Vocal with orchestra and male quartet directed by Morris Stoloff

Side 2
No.	Title	Writer(s)	Note(s)	Length
1.	"Where the Black Eyed Susans Grow"	Richard A. Whiting—Dave Radford	Vocal with orchestra directed by Morris Stoloff

Side 3
No.	Title	Writer(s)	Note(s)	Length
1.	"When the Red, Red Robin Comes Bob, Bob, Bobbin' Along"	Harry Woods	Vocal with orchestra directed by Morris Stoloff

Side 4
No.	Title	Writer(s)	Note(s)	Length
1.	"Someone Else May Be There While I'm Gone"	Irving Berlin	Vocal with orchestra directed by Morris Stoloff

Side 5
No.	Title	Writer(s)	Note(s)	Length
1.	"For Me and My Gal"	George W. Meyer—Edgar Leslie—E. Ray Goetz	Vocal with orchestra directed by Morris Stoloff

Side 6
No.	Title	Writer(s)	Note(s)	Length
1.	"When I Leave the World Behind"	Irving Berlin	Vocal with orchestra directed by Morris Stoloff

Side 7
No.	Title	Writer(s)	Note(s)	Length
1.	"There's a Rainbow 'Round My Shoulder"	Al Jolson—Billy Rose—Dave Dreyer	Vocal with orchestra directed by Morris Stoloff

Side 8
No.	Title	Writer(s)	Note(s)	Length
1.	"About a Quarter to Nine"	Harry Warren—Al Dubin	Vocal with orchestra directed by Morris Stoloff

10-inch LP (Decca DL 5030)

Side 1
No.	Title	Length
1.	"I Want a Girl (Just Like the Girl That Married Dear Old Dad)"
2.	"Where the Black Eyed Susans Grow"
3.	"When the Red, Red, Robin Comes Bob, Bob, Bobbin' Along"
4.	"Someone Else May Be There While I'm Gone"

Side 2
No.	Title	Length
1.	"For Me and My Gal"
2.	"When I Leave the World Behind"
3.	"There's a Rainbow 'Round My Shoulder"
4.	"About a Quarter to Nine"

== Charts ==
Chart (1948)	Peak position
US Billboard Best-Selling Popular Record Albums	1

== See also ==
- List of Billboard Best-Selling Popular Record Albums number ones of 1948
