= Al Jolson Souvenir Album, Volume 4 =

Compilation album by Al Jolson
- Released: 1949
- Label: Decca

Al Jolson chronology
Jolson Sings Again (1949)	Al Jolson Souvenir Album, Volume 4 (1949)	Stephen Foster Songs (1950)

Al Jolson Souvenir Album, Volume 4 (also spelled as "Volume Four") is an album of phonograph records by Al Jolson, released by Decca in 1949 (catalog no. 712).

According to Billboard, the album compiled four single records "of varying vintage".

== Release ==
As of December 1949. the album was available as a set of four 10-inch 78-rpm phonograph records (cat. no. A-712) and as a long-play record (one 10-inch LP, cat. no. DL 5031). In 1951, it was made available on 45 rpm (a set of four 7-inch records, cat. no. 9-159).

== Critical reception ==
Professional ratings
Review scores
Source	Rating
Billboard	78/100 ("good")

Billboard reviewed the album in its issue from December 10, 1949, rating it 78 on a scale of 100 ("good") and writing: "Four single records of varying vintage are packed here. All are good Jolson songs, some, like "Avalon" and "Anniversary," are closely identified with him. While this album won't enjoy the promotional benefits of the picture albums, it should do some business among Jolson's admirers."

== Track listing ==
Set of four 10-inch 78-rpm records (Decca A-712)

Side 1
No.	Title	Writer(s)	Note(s)	Length
1.	"Avalon"	Vincent Rose—Al Jolson—B. G. De Sylva	Featured in Columbia Picture The Jolson Story; Vocal with orchestra directed by Morris Stoloff

Side 2
No.	Title	Writer(s)	Note(s)	Length
1.	"Anniversary Song"	Al Jolson—Saul Chaplin	Featured in Columbia Picture The Jolson Story; Vocal with orchestra directed by Morris Stoloff

Side 3
No.	Title	Writer(s)	Note(s)	Length
1.	"All My Love"	Al Jolson—Harry Akst—Saul Chaplin	Vocal with orchestra directed by Jay Blackton

Side 4
No.	Title	Writer(s)	Note(s)	Length
1.	"Keep Smiling at Trouble (Trouble's a Bubble)"	Lewis Gensler—Al Jolson—B. G. De Sylva	Vocal with orchestra directed by Jay Blackton

Side 5
No.	Title	Writer(s)	Note(s)	Length
1.	"If I Only Had a Match"	Lee Morris—Arthur Johnston—Geo. W. Meyer	Vocal with orchestra directed by Morris Stoloff

Side 6
No.	Title	Writer(s)	Note(s)	Length
1.	"Let Me Sing and I'm Happy"	Irving Berlin	Vocal with orchestra directed by Morris Stoloff

Side 7
No.	Title	Writer(s)	Note(s)	Length
1.	"By the Light of the Silvery Moon"	Gus Edwards—Ed. Madden	Vocal with male quartet and orchestra directed by Morris Stoloff

Side 8
No.	Title	Writer(s)	Note(s)	Length
1.	"I Wish I Had a Girl"	Grace Le Boy—Gus Kahn	Vocal with male quartet and orchestra directed by Morris Stoloff

10-inch LP (Decca DL 5031)

Side 1
No.	Title	Length
1.	"Avalon"
2.	"Anniversary Song"
3.	"All My Love"
4.	"Keep Smiling at Trouble (Trouble's a Bubble)"

Side 2
No.	Title	Length
1.	"If I Only Had a Match"
2.	"Let Me Sing and I'm Happy"
3.	"By the Light of the Silvery Moon"
4.	"I Wish I Had a Girl"
