= The Unknown Man =

1951 film by Richard Thorpe

- Theatrical release poster
- Directed by: Richard Thorpe
- Screenplay by: George Froeschel; Ronald Millar
- Story by: George Froeschel; Ronald Millar
- Produced by: Robert Thomsen
- Starring: Walter Pidgeon; Ann Harding; Barry Sullivan
- Narrated by: Barry Sullivan
- Cinematography: William C. Mellor
- Edited by: Ben Lewis
- Music by: Conrad Salinger
- Distributed by: Metro-Goldwyn-Mayer
- Release date: November 16, 1951 (United States)
- Running time: 86 minutes
- Country: United States
- Language: English
- Budget: $618,000
- Box office: $711,000

The Unknown Man is a 1951 American courtroom drama film directed by Richard Thorpe and starring Walter Pidgeon, Ann Harding and Barry Sullivan.

== Plot ==
Defense attorney Dwight Bradley Masen is successful in seeking the acquittal of a young man, Rudi Walchek, accused of knifing to death the 19-year-old son of a local locksmith, but when Rudi lets a comment slip after the trial, Masen realizes he has defended a guilty man. Masen discovers that Rudi is also a member of a syndicate extorting money from the scared merchants in the locksmith's neighborhood. After unearthing new evidence, Masen tries to convince the D.A. to retry the case, but the latter refuses on grounds of double jeopardy.

Masen discovers that the head of the citizens' crime commission is also involved in the syndicate. In a rage Masen kills Layford, but the murder is pinned on Rudi. Despite sensing a higher justice at work, Masen feels obliged to defend Rudi once again. This time Rudi is found guilty. Masen confesses to the D.A. that he is the culprit, but the D.A. feels justice has been served and refuses to reopen the case. Masen makes one final visit to Rudi in prison, confesses, gives him the murder weapon and turns his back to Rudi to await his fate.

== Cast ==
- Walter Pidgeon as Dwight Bradley "Brad" Masen
- Ann Harding as Stella Masen
- Barry Sullivan as DA Joe Bucknor
- Keefe Brasselle as Rudi Walchek
- Lewis Stone as Judge James V. Holbrook
- Eduard Franz as Andrew Jason "Andy" Layford
- Richard Anderson as Bob Masen
- Dawn Addams as Ellie Fansworth
- Philip Ober as Wayne Kellwin
- Konstantin Shayne as Peter Hulderman
- Mari Blanchard as Sally Tever
- Don Beddoe as Ed—Fingerprint Man
- John Maxwell as Dr. Palmer
- Robert Williams as Sam—Deputy

== Production ==
The film was known as The Bradley Masen Story in production. It was the first time Stone had played a judge since the Andy Hardy series. The role was intended for Lionel Barrymore but had to be rewritten when Barrymore fell ill. The movie was reportedly Thorpe's 50th for MGM.

== Reception ==
According to MGM records the film earned $381,000 in the US and Canada and $330,000 elsewhere, resulting in a loss of $455,000.

=== Critical response ===
Film critic Dennis Schwartz questioned the screenplay and the casting in his review of the film, "A contrived morality lesson is delivered by sentimental lawyer Walter Pidgeon, from a plot that is held together by social conscious issues alone. Richard Thorpe directs this capable but miscast cast (romantic lead Pidgeon is a fish out of water playing a lawyer, supporting actors Lewis Stone and Ann Harding seem stiff taking roles away from their usual comedy ones) in this bizarre and incredulous triumph of justice tale ... By the end, everyone looked foolish with Pidgeon looking dead foolish. Pidgeon has the kind of ridiculous lawyer part where even someone as esteemed as Clarence Darrow couldn't have played it convincingly; so I don't blame Pidgeon for this misfire."

Critic Craig Butler also discussed the screenplay in his review, "The Unknown Man has an interesting message, but the manner in which it is presented makes for some significant believability problems. For instance, it's hard to believe that a lawyer with no criminal trial experience would be able to get his client off in the way he does in Man ... Man might have been a better film if the writers had kept things a little simpler, but it's worth a look for crime fans on the lookout for something they haven't seen a dozen times."

== Comic book adaptation ==
- Avon Periodicals: The Unknown Man (1951)
