= Someone Else May Be There While I'm Gone =

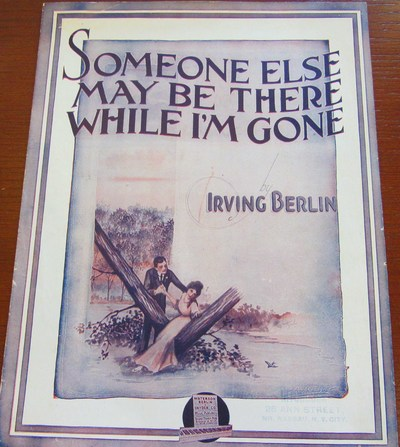
- Sheet music cover

Song
- Published: 1917
- Songwriter: Irving Berlin

"Someone Else May Be There While I'm Gone" is a World War I era song written by Irving Berlin and published as sheet music in 1917. The song, recorded by Al Jolson for Columbia Records (catalog No. A-2124) on September 19, 1916 was very popular that year. Jolson recorded it again for Decca Records (catalog No. 24398) on December 5, 1947.
