= Jolson Sings Again =

1949 film by Henry Levin

- 1949 Theatrical Poster
- Directed by: Henry Levin
- Written by: Sidney Buchman
- Produced by: Sidney Buchman
- Starring: Larry Parks; Barbara Hale; William Demarest; Ludwig Donath
- Cinematography: William E. Snyder
- Edited by: William A. Lyon
- Music by: George Duning; Morris Stoloff
- Production company: Columbia Pictures
- Distributed by: Columbia Pictures
- Release date: August 10, 1949
- Running time: 96 minutes
- Country: United States
- Language: English
- Budget: $1.5 million
- Box office: $5 million (est. US / Canada rentals)

Jolson Sings Again is a 1949 American musical biographical film directed by Henry Levin. It is the sequel to The Jolson Story (1946), and both films cover the life of singer Al Jolson. It was the highest-grossing film of 1949 and received three Oscar nominations at the 22nd Academy Awards.

== Plot ==
Al Jolson returns home after an unexpected nightclub performance only to find that his wife has left him. Devastated, he trades show business for life in the fast lane: women, horses, prizefighters, and travel. His father becomes increasingly concerned about his frivolous lifestyle. With the death of his mother and the beginning of World War II, Jolson returns to reality and the stage. Teamed with manager Steve Martin, Jolson travels the world entertaining troops everywhere from Alaska to Africa. When he finally collapses from exhaustion, pretty young nurse Ellen Clark shows him that there is more to life than "just rushing around".

New singers have eclipsed Jolson in popularity and his health has declined. He now has only one good lung, reducing his vocal power. Martin finds that there is no demand for Al Jolson anymore, but he withholds this news from Jolson. In desperation, Martin secures a spot for Jolson in an all-star charity benefit. Jolson is dismayed to find his name absent from the posters and programs, and his spot on the bill is even more humbling, as he does not take the stage until the marathon show has almost ended, singing "Sonny Boy" to the patrons still in attendance. He is disheartened by the experience, although his wife Ellen insists that his performance was magnificent. One of the remaining patrons is Ralph Bryant, an Army officer who met Jolson during his military tour. Bryant is now a Hollywood producer, and he approaches Jolson with the idea of producing a screen biography of his life. Jolson is interested, although he warns that the quality of his old, worn phonograph records would not be acceptable for use in a film. Bryant asks Jolson to sing for new, higher-fidelity recordings at the film studio.

The project renews Jolson's interest in show business and he trains actor Larry Parks to mimic his stage movements. When The Jolson Story premieres, Jolson is terrified of the public's reaction and can't sit still in the theater. However, the film is a great success and Jolson is again a major celebrity, with the jubilant Ellen at his side.

== Cast ==
=== Credited ===
- Larry Parks as Al Jolson / Larry Parks
- Barbara Hale as Ellen Clark
- William Demarest as Steve Martin
- Ludwig Donath as Cantor Yoelson
- Bill Goodwin as Tom Baron
- Myron McCormick as Ralph Bryant
- Tamara Shayne as Mama Yoelson

=== Uncredited ===
- Eric Wilton as Henry, Jolson's butler
- Robert Emmett Keane as Charlie, benefit producer
- Nelson Leigh as Theater Manager
- Milton Delugg as Accordionist
- Helen Mowery as Script Girl
- Marjorie Stapp as Nurse

== Production ==
The huge commercial success of The Jolson Story prompted a sequel, announced in 1947. At one point it seemed the film might be made at MGM rather than Columbia, due to conflicts between Jolson and Columbia's head of production Harry Cohn. Edwin Knopf was announced as producer and Gene Kelly was mentioned as a possible Jolson. However, the differences between Jolson and Columbia were resolved and the film was made at Columbia, with Larry Parks repeating as Jolson.

Jolson recorded 40 songs for the movie, twice more than were needed, as Columbia wanted to possibly make a third film. At one point Eddie Buzzell was going to direct; eventually the job went to Henry Levin. The film had a smaller budget than the original and a reduced shooting time - 36 days as opposed to 100.

Larry Parks was having contractual problems with Columbia, and there were doubts that he would reprise his portrayal of Jolson. Jolson himself made a screen test, hoping to play the lead. George Jessel recommended Mark Stevens. However, Parks agreed to play the lead, and filming started on November 11, 1948.

Parks, already impressive in The Jolson Story, improved on his dramatic interpretation of Al Jolson: "I had one particular problem. Jolson had pre-recorded all the songs before the script was ready, and he sang every one as if he were going to drop dead at the end of it. Well, that was Jolson. He always sang like that, which was why people loved him. But it was difficult from an actor's point of view. In one scene I was supposed to be singing ["I'm Just Wild About Harry"] as loudly as I could one second, and then collapse in the middle of the song. How do you taper off at the top of your lungs? I finally decided to play it as if I were singing loudly out of desperation, struggling to get to the end of the song."

== Release ==
The world premiere of Jolson Sings Again was held at New York's Loew's State Theatre on August 17, 1949, and it was afforded a lavish Hollywood premiere on October 19, 1949, at the Hollywood Pantages Theatre, with Jolson and many top film stars in attendance.

Al Jolson assumed an active role in promoting Jolson Sings Again, embarking on a whirlwind tour of personal appearances. He appeared at six Loews theaters in New York during a single evening, singing three songs at each house. He also toured New York radio stations, where he was interviewed by disc jockeys. The film was enormously successful in the New York area, breaking sales records on Broadway.

Columbia sensed that Jolson Sings Again would be a gold mine, and demanded as much as 60% of each theater's admissions for the film. Several industry associations of theater owners strenuously objected, and accused Columbia of price gouging, contending that the practice was illegal. Columbia denied having requested a raise in ticket prices and challenged the theater owners to present evidence to the contrary. The theater owners took their case to the Department of Justice, but assistant attorney general Herbert A. Bergson responded: "When a distributor asks terms, he is putting a value on his own product. I cannot see anything illegal in that. The exhibitor does not have to take the picture. If the distributor wants to price himself out of the market, that is his worry, not ours."

== Reception ==
The film was a huge box office success, earning more than $5 million in North America. Al Jolson himself conceded that Larry Parks had done a superlative job: "When studio executives first showed Al Jolson rushes of the 'Sonny Boy' number, Jolson, obviously stirred, said later, 'Ten seconds after the song started, I forgot I'd made that soundtrack, because Larry was giving that song from his heart!'"

=== Critical response ===
In a contemporary review for The New York Times, critic Thomas M. Pryor called Jolson Sings Again "an occasion which warrants some lusty cheering" and wrote:

As the second chapter in an affectionately pointed tribute to a fabulous entertainer, the new picture ... is an entity in itself and is at least twice as good as The Jolson Story. Sidney Buchman, who wrote and produced Jolson Sings Again for Columbia, has shrewdly bridged the gap between this Technicolored picture and its predecessor so that a knowledge of the 1946 production is not necessary for complete understanding and enjoyment. But Mr. Buchman has done even more. He has measured the character of Al Jolson, and by mixing in a little vinegar with the sugar has come up with a reasonably accurate biographical sketch rounding out the second quarter century in the career of a great performer. There is heart, humor, tragedy, and a warm sprinkling of sentiment in Mr. Buchman's story. ... In the final analysis, Jolson Sings Again is as much Al Jolson's picture as if he actually were seen in it, for without his voice on the soundtrack all the other remarkable efforts would have been in vain. There is only one voice like Jolson's and it is good to be hearing it again.

Anonymous reviewer "Mae Tinée" of the Chicago Tribune wrote:

It isn't often that a musical makes this critic want to dash to her typewriter to sing its praises, but if this film doesn't hit a new high for popularity I'm very much mistaken. As one of the minority who found a few flaws in its predecessor ''The Jolson Story'', I am happy to say there is not a thing wrong with the second chapter of the famous entertainer's biography. The thousands who found the 1946 production highly satisfactory are sure to be even more pleased with this one. ... Here's a well rounded motion picture which contains all the best ingredients for entertaining people of all ages and tastes, astutely blended and skilfully presented. The audience broke into unaccustomed and enthusiastic applause as the film ended, and it's my guess that you'll do the same when you see it.

Kate Cameron of the New York Daily News wrote: "The second film is not as sentimental, nor as heart-warming in its domestic scenes, as its predecessor. It is, however, well made and more interesting from a technical standpoint than the first, as it takes the audience into the Columbia studio in Hollywood to show just how The Jolson Story was created."

Abel Green of Variety labeled Jolson Sings Again "a smasheroo of unqualified proportions" and wrote: "It is only natural that the durability of Jolson, as the all-time No. 1 performing personality in contemporaneous show business, would be matched by an equally rich real-life story. Jolson Sings Again proves that."

== Awards ==
The film was nominated for three Academy Awards: Best Story and Screenplay (Sidney Buchman), Best Scoring of a Musical Picture (Morris Stoloff and George Duning) and Best Cinematography, Color (William E. Snyder), but failed to win in any category. Buchman was also nominated for a Writers Guild of America Award in the Best Written Musical category.

== Proposed third film ==
Jolson wanted to make a third film for Columbia but insisted on playing himself. This met with resistance, according to Film Bulletin: "This time [Harry] Cohn hopes to persuade Jolson to appear in the picture, although not playing himself. That task will again go to Larry Parks, with Jolson cast in a character role."

In August 1950, with the Columbia situation at an impasse, Al Jolson was determined to return to the screen in his own person. He signed with writer-producers Norman Krasna and Jerry Wald to appear in a new musical for RKO, The USO Story, a tribute to the United Service Organization's staging shows at military camps. Jolson died in October 1950, before production began; he was replaced by Tony Martin. After four rewrites, with such stars as Groucho Marx, Laurel and Hardy, and Spike Jones announced at one time or another, studio head Howard Hughes retooled the story as a Marlene Dietrich vehicle, The Girls Have Landed. The project was finally abandoned.

Columbia's third Jolson picture never came about, either, owing to Jolson's death and Parks's blacklisting, which cost Parks his contract with Columbia.

== See also ==
- Jolson Sings Again (album) – an album of phonograph records featuring songs featured in the film; the songs were re-recorded by Al Jolson specially for Decca Records

== Notes ==
- McClelland, Doug (1987). Blackface to Blacklist: Al Jolson, Larry Parks, and The Jolson Story. Metuchen, N.J.: Scarecrow Press.
