= Jolson Sings Again (album) =

Studio album by Al Jolson
- Released: 1949
- Label: Decca

Al Jolson chronology
Al Jolson, Volume 3 (1948)	Jolson Sings Again (1949)	Al Jolson Souvenir Album, Volume 4 (1949)

Jolson Sings Again is a studio album recorded by Al Jolson for Decca. It was originally released in 1949 as a set of four 78-rpm phonograph records (catalog no. 716).

Jolson Sings Again collected songs featured in the Columbia Pictures film Jolson Sings Again (released in the same year). The songs were re-recorded specially for the album.

== Release ==
The album was originally released as a set of four 10-inch 78-rpm phonograph records (cat. no. A-716). In the same year, it was made available on a long-play record (one 10-inch LP, cat. no. DL 5006).

== Critical reception ==
Professional ratings
Review scores
Source	Rating
Billboard	90/100 ("tops")

Billboard reviewed the album in its issue from September 3, 1949, rating it 90 on a scale of 100 ("tops") and writing: "Since these disks are a prominent feature in the promotion plans for the picture [Jolson Sings Again], it must be considered almost as sure-fire as the first Jolson album". The reviewer also added: "To hoot, this album will be included in Decca's first long-play release."

== Reception ==
The album spent several weeks at number two on Billboard's Pop Albums chart.

== Track listing ==
Set of four 10-inch 78-rpm records (Decca A-716)

Side 1
No.	Title	Writer(s)	Note(s)	Length
1.	"Pretty Baby"	Tony Jackson—Egbert Van Alstyne—Gus Kahn	Al Jolson with Morris Stoloff and his orchestra	2:32

Side 2
No.	Title	Writer(s)	Note(s)	Length
1.	"(1)" "I'm Looking over a Four Leaf Clover" "(2)" "Baby Face"	Woods–Dixon; Davis–Akst	Al Jolson with Morris Stoloff and his orchestra	2:32

Side 3
No.	Title	Writer(s)	Note(s)	Length
1.	"Give My Regards to Broadway"	George M. Cohan	Al Jolson with Lee Gordon Singers and Morris Stoloff and his orchestra	2:33

Side 4
No.	Title	Writer(s)	Note(s)	Length
1.	"I'm Just Wild About Harry"	Noble Sissle—Eubie Blake	Al Jolson with Lee Gordon Singers and Morris Stoloff and his orchestra	2:13

Side 5
No.	Title	Writer(s)	Note(s)	Length
1.	"After You've Gone"	Henry Creamer—J. Turner Layton	Al Jolson with 4 Hits and a Miss and Morris Stoloff and his orchestra	2:49

Side 6
No.	Title	Writer(s)	Note(s)	Length
1.	"Chinatown, My Chinatown"	William Jerome—Jean Schwartz	Al Jolson with 4 Hits and a Miss and Matty Malneck and his orchestra	2:10

Side 7
No.	Title	Writer(s)	Note(s)	Length
1.	"I Only Have Eyes for You"	Harry Warren—Al Dubin	Al Jolson with Morris Stoloff and his orchestra	2:44

Side 8
No.	Title	Writer(s)	Note(s)	Length
1.	"Is It True What They Say About Dixie?"	Irving Caesar—Sammy Lerner—Gerald Marks	Al Jolson with Lee Gordon Singers and Morris Stoloff and his orchestra	2:39

10-inch LP (Decca DL 5006)

Side 1
No.	Title	Length
1.	"Pretty Baby"
2.	"I'm Looking over a Four Leaf Clover" "Baby Face"
3.	"Give My Regards to Broadway"
4.	"I'm Just Wild About Harry"

Side 2
No.	Title	Length
1.	"After You've Gone"
2.	"Chinatown, My Chinatown"
3.	"I Only Have Eyes for You"
4.	"Is It True What They Say About Dixie?"

== Charts ==
Chart (1949)	Peak position
US Billboard Pop Albums	2
