= The Jolson Story =

1946 film by Alfred E. Green

- Theatrical release poster
- Directed by: Alfred E. Green
- Screenplay by: Stephen Longstreet; Sidney Buchman (uncredited)
- Story by: Adaptation: Harry Chandlee; Andrew Solt
- Produced by: Sidney Skolsky; Sidney Buchman (uncredited)
- Starring: Larry Parks; Evelyn Keyes; William Demarest; Bill Goodwin
- Cinematography: Joseph Walker
- Edited by: William A. Lyon
- Music by: Morris Stoloff
- Color process: Technicolor
- Production company: Columbia Pictures
- Distributed by: Columbia Pictures
- Release date: October 10, 1946
- Running time: 130 minutes
- Country: United States
- Language: English
- Budget: $2 million or $2.8 million
- Box office: $7.6 million (US/Canada rentals) or $8 million

The Jolson Story is a 1946 American biographical musical film, a highly fictionalized account of the life of singer Al Jolson, produced by Columbia Pictures and directed by Alfred E. Green. It stars Larry Parks as Jolson, Evelyn Keyes as Julie Benson (approximating Jolson's wife, Ruby Keeler), William Demarest as his performing partner and manager, Ludwig Donath and Tamara Shayne as his parents, and Scotty Beckett as the young Jolson. Some of the film's episodes are based on fact but the story is extremely simplified, with people disguised or combined into single characters.

== Plot ==
Stage-struck Asa Yoelson wants to sing in burlesque performer Steve Martin's act. Cantor Yoelson, his father, refuses to consider it. After Asa runs away but is found in Baltimore, the Yoelsons grudgingly consent. Martin eventually gives him billing, under a new name: Al Jolson. Soon afterward, an entertainer named Tom Baron, who is in the same show as Martin and Jolson, passes out drunk, and Jolson goes on in his place. Jolson receives a job offer from minstrel-show master Lew Dockstader, who is in the audience, and Martin releases Jolson.

Al succeeds with the minstrel troupe and is invited to join a Broadway show (thanks to Martin, behind the scenes). Al becomes the leading player and takes the show on tour. Al hires his old mentor Martin, now unemployed, to be his manager. (In real life, Jolson never had a manager with this name. Jolson had three managers over the course of his career- Steve Martin is a composite of all three.)

Jolson's career prevents him spending much time at home. He had always thought that someday he would marry his childhood friend, Ann Murray, but she eventually accepts a proposal from Roy Anderson, another childhood friend.

Soon afterward, Al meets up-and-coming dancer Julie Benson. It is love at first sight for Al, who proposes to her that night. (Al Jolson was actually married four times. The character Julie Benson is modeled on his third wife, Ruby Keeler.) Julie does not love him immediately, but Al refuses to take no for an answer, and she eventually agrees to consider it. After Al misses a show in order to attend the opening of Julie's first show, she realizes his feelings for her are genuine and they marry. Al electrifies the show world with his first feature film, The Jazz Singer, and eagerly signs for more movies. His wife wants to quit show business and settle down, but Al persuades her to continue with her career. Julie becomes a movie star, but eventually can't stand any more of Al's nonstop, show-biz lifestyle. Al realizes that the only way to keep Julie is to quit show business.

Al refuses all job offers and absolutely will not sing, even for family and friends. Papa Yoelson persuades his son to join him in a song – the music he and Mama Yoelson danced to at their wedding – and Al gets caught up in it. They adjourn to a nightclub, where the audience demands a song. Al agrees to a single number but the crowd yells for more. Julie, seeing Al happier than he's been in years, leaves while he's performing. She walks out of the nightclub and out of his life, leaving Al to his first love: singing.

== Cast ==
- Larry Parks as Al Jolson
- Evelyn Keyes as Julie Benson
- William Demarest as Steve Martin
- Bill Goodwin as Tom Baron
- Ludwig Donath as Cantor Yoelson
- Scotty Beckett as Asa Yoelson/Al Jolson as a boy
- Tamara Shayne as Mrs. Yoelson
- Jo-Carroll Dennison as Ann Murray as an adult
- Ann Todd as Ann Murray as a girl
- John Alexander as Lew Dockstader
- Edwin Maxwell as Oscar Hammerstein
- Ernest Cossart as Father McGee
- Harry Shannon as Officer Reilly
- Eric Wilton as Henry, the Jolsons' butler
- Robert Mitchell Boys' Choir as the church choir (as Mitchell 'Boychoir')
- William Forrest as Dick Glenn, movie producer
- Eddie Kane as Florenz Ziegfeld
- Buddy Gorman as Jimmy, theater call boy
- Rudy Wissler, singing voice for Scotty Beckett (uncredited)
- Al Jolson, singing voice for Larry Parks (uncredited)

== Musical numbers ==
- "Let Me Sing and I'm Happy"
- "On the Banks of the Wabash"
- "Ave Maria"
- "When You Were Sweet Sixteen"
- "After the Ball"
- "By the Light of the Silvery Moon"
- "Blue Bell"
- "Ma Blushin' Rosie"
- "I Want a Girl"
- "My Mammy"
- "I'm Sitting on Top of the World"
- "You Made Me Love You"
- "Swanee"

- "Toot, Toot, Tootsie! (Goo' Bye)"
- "The Spaniard That Blighted My Life"
- "April Showers"
- "California, Here I Come"
- "Liza (All the Clouds'll Roll Away)"
- "There's a Rainbow 'Round My Shoulder"
- "Avalon"
- "She's a Latin from Manhattan"
- "About a Quarter to Nine"
- "Anniversary Song"
- "Waiting for the Robert E. Lee"
- "Rock-a-Bye Your Baby with a Dixie Melody"

== Production ==
=== Development ===
The film was the idea of Sidney Skolsky. In 1943 he pitched a Jolson biopic to Warner Bros, for whom Jolson had made The Jazz Singer, but Jack Warner was unenthusiastic, as Jolson's career was in a slump at the time. No other studios were interested either apart from Harry Cohn at Columbia. He agreed to make the movie and assigned Sidney Buchman to oversee it. It is generally agreed regardless of the credits that Buchman was the prime creative force behind the movie.

Skolsky sold the project to Cohn without first securing the rights from Jolson himself. When Columbia approached Jolson, the performer announced he had received an offer from Warner Bros. for $250,000 and a promise that the film would be directed by Michael Curtiz, who had just made Yankee Doodle Dandy for Warners. Columbia counter-offered 50% of the profits and promised that the film would receive special attention from the studio. Jolson chose Columbia, provided he was paid $25,000 for recording his songs.

The biography was announced in December 1943 under the title Minstrel Boy, with Jolson set as both star and producer. The title had to be changed because PRC was then producing its most elaborate musical, Minstrel Man (released in 1944), starring Jolson contemporary Benny Fields.

=== Script ===
Skolsky wrote the biggest problem with the film was to make Jolson a "lovable showoff". He claimed he came up with the idea of Jolson being someone who needed to see people's faces being happy while he sang. Many different writers worked on the script. Sidney Buchman claimed he felt the secret to the film was making it a love story, where Jolson was in love with applause.

According to Skolsky the "best material" came from writer Stephen Longstreet but that "at least three-fourths" of the final script was written by the uncredited John Howard Lawson.

=== Accuracy ===
Much of the plot was fictionalized. There is no evidence that Jolson ever appeared as a child singer. His mother is shown as still alive at the end of the picture. In fact, she died in 1895, when he was nine years old, and he was brought up by his sister. His brother Harry is eliminated. as is much of his early career. Jolson actually had three managers, notably A. C. Olson, who were combined into the William Demarest character "Steve Martin".

Ruby Keeler, Jolson's third wife, disliked Jolson so much that she refused to allow her name to be used, so the writers used an alias, "Julie Benson". Columbia paid her $25,000 to agree not to criticize the film.

=== Casting ===
The 59-year-old Jolson wanted to play the lead himself but Columbia refused, as the story encompassed his years as a young man. Jolson then requested James Cagney or an equivalent star but Cagney turned the role down, as did popular nightclub star Danny Thomas.

Larry Parks had been a fixture at Columbia for four years, first as an actor in screen tests, then as a featured player in major films and as the star of minor ones. In November 1944 he was the first actor tested for The Story of Jolson, as the project was then titled. Then the studio tested dozens of other candidates -- including future producer Ross Hunter -- until, as Parks recalled, "someone said 'Let's test that first guy again.' I had the dubious honor of making the first and last tests for the role." His casting was announced in October 1945.

Evelyn Keyes was a contract player at Columbia, often entrusted with roles calling for intelligence as well as attractiveness. Scotty Beckett was recommended by Jolson.

Parks's vocals were recorded by Al Jolson himself; Scotty Beckett's songs were recorded by Rudy Wissler. Jolson, determined to appear onscreen somehow, persuaded the producer to film him instead of Parks for the blackface "Swanee" number. Jolson is seen entirely in long shot; he performs on a theater runway, recreating his famous fluttering dance step. Jolson had a 50% share of the profits, but was uncredited for his dubbed vocals. He was paid $25,000 for the use of his voice.

=== Filming ===
Filming started in October 1945 with the film in black-and-white. H. Bruce Humberstone was borrowed from 20th Century-Fox to direct but, according to Variety, he had to drop out when the shooting dates kept being pushed back. Humberstone later claimed he quit because Buchman kept rewriting the script.

Filming was shut down. Studio chief Harry Cohn, encouraged by the dailies, decided to restart the project as a Technicolor production, ordering bigger sets to be constructed and more songs added. Cohn had been impressed by director Joseph H. Lewis's handling of the musical numbers in the 1944 PRC feature Minstrel Man, and asked Lewis to take over the direction. Lewis was already committed to direct So Dark the Night but agreed to direct the musical sequences. Filming started again on October 24, 1945 and eventually Alfred E. Green was hired to direct.

A scene where Jolson sang "Sonny Boy" was cut out because it slowed the action despite rights to the song costing $50,000. The song was ultimately used three years later in a sequel, Jolson Sings Again.

There are varying accounts of the final cost. Skolsky said it was budgeted at $1,150,000 but after filming he authorized the construction of more elaborate sets and the re-recording of certain songs, raising the final budget was $2,500,000. According to Variety the negative cost was $2 million but this went up to $2.8 million after Columbia paid for film prints, advertising, and overhead.

Larry Parks found the leading role challenging -- because Jolson himself was on the set watching his every move, and "Jolson was never too happy with me" -- and difficult, because Parks had no firsthand knowledge of Jolson's stage mannerisms. "All Jolson's movies were Warner Bros. and we were making The Jolson Story for Columbia. So Harry Cohn, the studio boss, asked Jack Warner if we could borrow the Jolson films so I could study them. And Jack Warner, in a heartwarming display of reciprocity, said 'Hell, no.'"

== Release ==
=== Promotion ===
Columbia was very careful about publicizing the picture. Motion Picture Herald reported four considerations: modern audiences didn't know Jolson; his songs were now dated; his still-familiar blackface characterizations might not be well received in certain parts of America; and the film's leading man was unknown to many audiences. Columbia addressed these problems by issuing two sets of advertising—one "neutral" set, showing the Jolson figure in silhouette, and one set for general release after the first engagements, including Parks's likeness and calling attention to the critics' rave reviews. As the release date approached, Columbia arranged advertising tie-ups with a new Decca Records album of Jolson favorites, and promoted the film in radio commercials. Immediately before release, Columbia received a tremendous boost when the American Veterans' Committee in New York gave Jolson a testimonial dinner, well attended by current celebrities and broadcast nationally on radio.

=== Private screening ===
Parks's mother Leona was then terminally ill with cancer. She lived to see her son's triumph when the film was screened in a studio projection room. "They had to carry her upstairs," reported columnist Ida Zeitlin, "but illness didn't keep her from sitting enthralled to the end, nor from writing to Betty (Betty Garrett, Parks's wife) next day: 'Oh, honey, are you going to be proud of your fella!'" Harry Cohn, president of Columbia, rewarded Parks with a cash bonus and a new Ford convertible.

== Reception ==
=== Critical ===
"This is a show! And what a show it proves to be. The reviewer has his hands full trying to cover even the highlights within the space afforded," enthused Showmen's Trade Review; "Parks is a tremendously effective actor in this role. He must have worked almost endlessly to effect so perfectly the Jolson speech and the Jolson mannerism (in minute detail) in putting over the songs." Ray Lanning of Motion Picture Herald agreed: "Now here is the way to produce a musical biography. The Jolson Story is a show that can't miss. The music will have you humming and remembering, the acting will please you, you'll admire the production and the carefully done and subdued coloring. It's a special kind of picture with the widest kind of appeal." Box Office Digest registered amazement: "We didn't believe it possible that the Jolson magic -- as Jolson, and not a character of the stage and screen -- could be brought to pulsating life. Columbia has done it. It is a humdinger of a picture. The outstanding facet of The Jolson Story is one Larry Parks. Jolson's voice on the soundtrack supplies some 15 of his most memorable songs. From there on this youngster Larry Parks takes up the chore of giving us Jolson physically. The result is uncanny and impressive. Before the end the stuttering critics were wondering whether Jolson could have played Jolson as well. That's sumpin. Reliable Scotty Beckett qualifies for a junior-grade Academy bid as the boyhood Jolson."

Arthur Beach of the National Board of Review cautioned readers that the story was heavily fictionalized: "In spite of these hazards The Jolson Story fares much better that other recent biographies on celluloid. It does reflect the spirit of his time, his flamboyant personality, and the showmanship that captured the applause of his generation. In doing this the picture, for all its sugar and spice, its amiable judgments, its facile mixture of the true, the near-true, and the frankly invented, creates a colorful, song-crammed panorama of show business. Larry Parks is a prettier Al than Al. He is also an astonishingly capable mimic. Mr. Parks's skill and the magic of movie technique have made possible an astounding fusion of two people to create a memorable portrait. Even Al Jolson should be pleased with The Jolson Story."

=== Box office ===
The film was an outstanding financial success making an estimated $8 million in the United States and Canada ($133 million in 2026 dollars), and an additional $5 million ($83 million in 2026) worldwide. This made it the most popular film in the history of Columbia and one of the most popular of all time.

=== Awards ===
The film won Academy Awards for Best Music, Scoring of a Musical Picture (Morris Stoloff), and Best Sound Recording (John Livadary). It was nominated for Best Actor in a Leading Role (Larry Parks), Best Actor in a Supporting Role (William Demarest), Best Cinematography, Color (Joseph Walker) and Best Film Editing (William A. Lyon). The film was also entered into the 1947 Cannes Film Festival.

On Rotten Tomatoes, The Jolson Story has a rare, excellent rating of 100% based on 5 reviews.

== Legacy ==
Parks became a full-fledged star in major productions. His sudden rise to prominence was considered an "overnight success," though he had been prominent in Columbia features for years. Parks continued playing character leads, but was most associated with his interpretation of Jolson. Columbia cast him in a successful sequel, Jolson Sings Again (1949). Two years later his career was derailed by blacklisting after he appeared before the House Unamerican Activities Committee and admitted to having been a member of the Communist Party.

The Jolson Story film is recognized by the American Film Institute in these lists:

- 2006: AFI's Greatest Movie Musicals – Nominated

== Radio adaptation ==
Lux Radio Theatre presented The Jolson Story on February 16, 1948. Jolson starred as himself in the one-hour adaptation. Jolson also starred in a Lux adaptation of his first feature The Jazz Singer, supported by Jolson Story actors Ludwig Donath and Tamara Shayne.

== Quotations ==
- "I heard some music tonight. Something they call 'jazz.' The fellows just make it up as they go along. They pick it out of the air." (Jolson to Dockstader)
- "[I'm] trying to make songs out of music I picked up. Music nobody ever heard of before, but the only kind I want to sing." (Jolson, explaining what he's been doing)
- "That's an audience that never saw a live show. People in small towns who can afford a movie, where they can't afford anything else. Audience of millions. I'd be singing to every one of them at the same time. That's really something!" (Jolson, discussing the new talking picture)
- "Tonight, folks, I'm only going to sing two thousand songs. One to a customer." (Jolson)
- "Broadway? What a street! You know something, baby? It belongs to me. You know something else? If you want it, I'll give it to you." (Jolson)

== Notes ==
- McClelland, Doug (1987). Blackface to blacklist : Al Jolson, Larry Parks, and The Jolson story. Metuchen, N.J.: Scarecrow Press.
- Skolsky, Sidney (1975). Don't get me wrong--I love Hollywood. New York: Putnam.
- Thomas, Bob (2000). King Cohn : the life and times of Hollywood mogul Harry Cohn. Beverly Hills: New Millennium Press.
