= Mission to Moscow =

1943 propaganda film by Michael Curtiz

- Theatrical release poster
- Directed by: Michael Curtiz
- Written by: Howard Koch
- Based on: Mission to Moscow; 1941 book by Joseph E. Davies
- Produced by: Robert Buckner
- Starring: Walter Huston; Ann Harding; Oskar Homolka
- Cinematography: Bert Glennon
- Edited by: Owen Marks
- Music by: Max Steiner
- Production company: Warner Bros. Pictures
- Distributed by: Warner Bros. Pictures
- Release date: May 22, 1943
- Running time: 124 minutes
- Country: United States
- Language: English
- Budget: $1,516,000
- Box office: $1.2 million (US rentals) or $1,649,000 worldwide

Mission to Moscow is a 1943 propaganda film directed by Michael Curtiz, based on the 1941 book by the former U.S. ambassador to the Soviet Union, Joseph E. Davies.

The movie chronicles the experiences of the second American ambassador to the Soviet Union and was made in response to a request by Franklin D. Roosevelt. It was made during World War II, when the Americans and Soviets were allies, and takes a sympathetic view of not only the USSR in general but of Stalinism and Stalinist repressions in particular. For that reason, it was scrutinized by the House Committee on Un-American Activities.

== Source book ==
The film is based on Joseph E. Davies' memoir about his time as the United States ambassador to the Soviet Union from November 1936 to June 1938. It was published by Simon & Schuster in 1941 and was a critical and commercial success—700,000 copies were sold, and the book was translated into thirteen languages.

== Plot ==
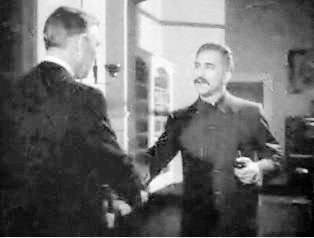
Joseph Stalin (Manart Kippen) greets U.S. ambassador Joseph E. Davies (Walter Huston) in Mission to Moscow.

The film chronicles ambassador Davies' impressions of the Soviet Union, his meetings with Stalin, and his overall opinion of the Soviet Union and its ties with the United States. It is made in a faux-documentary style, beginning with Davies meeting with president Franklin D. Roosevelt to discuss his new appointment as United States ambassador to the Soviet Union. It continues to show the Davies' family's trip by boat to Moscow, with stops in Europe.

While in Moscow, the movie alternates between Davies' interpretations of Soviet politics and communism and his family's impressions of Russian life. It includes a memorable scene with Mrs. Davies at a Russian department store. The movie gives Davies' perspective on various points in Soviet history. It begins with the real ambassador Davies stating, while seated in an armchair, "No leaders of a nation have been so misrepresented and misunderstood as those in the Soviet government during those critical years between the two world wars." The film then cuts to Walter Huston (portraying Davies) and begins its narrative.

Davies is shown witnessing the show trials conducted by Stalin in the 1930s (known as the Moscow Trials), which are portrayed as trials of fifth columnists working for Nazi Germany and Imperial Japan.

The voice-overs continue throughout the film, interspersing storyline with Davies' opinions. The film's narrative focuses on the journey of Davies and his family. First, their physical journey from the United States to the Soviet Union. And, second, their less tangible journey from skeptics of communism and the Soviet Union into converts and enthusiasts. The narrative of the movie and the book are almost identical.

Victims of Stalin's purge trials of the 1930s were portrayed as Fifth columnists.

== Cast ==
- Walter Huston as Ambassador Joseph E. Davies
- Ann Harding as Marjorie Davies
- Oscar Homolka as Maxim Litvinov, Foreign Minister
- George Tobias as Freddie
- Gene Lockhart as Premier Vyacheslav Molotov
- Eleanor Parker as Emlen Davies
- Richard Travis as Paul
- Helmut Dantine as Major Kamenev
- Victor Francen as Vyshinsky, chief trial prosecutor
- Henry Daniell as Minister von Ribbentrop
- Barbara Everest as Mrs. Litvinov
- Dudley Field Malone as Winston Churchill
- Roman Bohnen as Mr. Krestinsky
- Maria Palmer as Tanya Litvinov
- Moroni Olsen as Colonel Faymonville
- Minor Watson as Loy Henderson
- Vladimir Sokoloff as Mikhail Kalinin
- Maurice Schwartz as Dr. Botkin
- Ernst Hausman as Ship's Steward (uncredited)
- John Wengraf as Polish Ambassador Grzybowski (uncredited)
- Olaf Hytten as Parliament Member (uncredited)
- Frank Reicher as General von Koestrich (uncredited)
- Edward Van Sloan as German Diplomat in Berlin (uncredited)
- Ray Walker as Raymond, Davies' Butler (uncredited)
- Frieda Inescort as Madame Molotov (uncredited)
- Cyd Charisse as Galina Ulanova, Ballerina (uncredited)
- Lumsden Hare as Lord Chilston (uncredited)
- Kurt Katch as General Semen Timoshenko (uncredited)
- Doris Lloyd as Clementine Churchill (uncredited)
- Konstantin Shayne as Nikolai Bukharin (uncredited)
- Ivan Triesault as Marshal Mikhail Tukhachevsky (uncredited)
- Charles Trowbridge as Cordell Hull (uncredited)

== Production ==
While the storylines of both the book and movie are practically identical, the movie uses cinematic techniques and dialogue changes to overstate or change some controversial points in the book—changes that were made with Davies' approval. Although the first draft was written by Erskine Caldwell, the final screenplay adaptation of the book was by Howard Koch. Its musical score was by Max Steiner, its cinematography by Bert Glennon. The extensive montage sequences, which draw on footage from Soviet archives, were supervised by Don Siegel. The film was produced and distributed by Warner Bros. Pictures. Ambassador Davies appears and introduces the film as himself; he is then portrayed by Walter Huston. Ann Harding plays his wife Marjorie Davies, Gene Lockhart is Soviet foreign minister Vyacheslav Molotov, Henry Daniell his German counterpart Joachim von Ribbentrop, and Dudley Field Malone plays Winston Churchill. Most parts, bar those of Davies' family, are taken by character actors who look like the famous politicians they are representing.

The film was the first pro-Soviet Hollywood film of its time and was followed by others, including Samuel Goldwyn's The North Star (1943), MGM's Song of Russia (1944), Three Russian Girls (1943), Columbia's The Boy from Stalingrad (1943) and Counter-Attack (1945). Roosevelt himself approved the creation of the film, even meeting with Davies several times (July, October, and November 1942 and March 1943) during the film's production to discuss its progress.

As part of his contract with Warner Bros., Davies had absolute control over the script and could veto any dialogue not to his liking.

Curtiz wanted Fredric March to play Joseph E. Davies, while Olivia de Havilland auditioned to play Marjorie Davies. Pat O'Brien was cast as a Catholic priest, while Irene Manning was cast as a Moscow Opera House singer. Both characters were cut from the final film.

During production, Office of War Information officials reviewed screenplay revisions and prints of the film and commented on them. By reviewing the scripts and prints, OWI officials exercised authority over Mission to Moscow, ensuring that it promoted the "United Nations" theme. An administration official advised the film's producers to offer explanations for the Nazi-Soviet Pact and the Red Army's invasion of Finland. After reading the final script, in November 1942 the OWI expressed its hope that Mission to Moscow would "make one of the most remarkable pictures of this war" and "a very great contribution to the war information program".

The OWI report on Mission to Moscow concluded that it would

[B]e a most convincing means of helping Americans to understand their Russian allies. Every effort has been made to show that Russians and Americans are not so very different after all. The Russians are shown to eat well and live comfortably, which will be a surprise to many Americans. The leaders of both countries desire peace and both possess a blunt honesty of address and purpose ... One of the best services performed by this picture is the presentation of Russian leaders, not as wild-eyed madmen, but as far-seeing, earnest, responsible statesmen. They have proved very good neighbors, and this picture will help to explain why, as well as to encourage faith in the feasibility of post-war cooperation.

Government information specialists were equally enthusiastic about the completed print. Judging it "a magnificent contribution" to wartime propaganda, the OWI believed the picture would "do much to bring understanding of Soviet international policy in the past years and dispel the fears which many honest persons have felt with regard to our alliance with Russia". That was particularly so since "the possibility for the friendly alliance of the Capitalist United States and the Socialist Russia is shown to be firmly rooted in the mutual desire for peace of the two great countries".

Prior to its Russian release, the film was screened for Joseph Stalin at a banquet at the Moscow Kremlin attended by Joseph Davies and the British legation in Moscow.

== Historical accuracy ==
The film, made during World War II, shows the Soviet Union under Joseph Stalin in a positive light. Completed in late April 1943, the film is, in the words of Robert Buckner, the film's producer, "an expedient lie for political purposes, glossily covering up important facts with full or partial knowledge of their false presentation".

The movie gives a one-sided view of the Moscow trials, rationalizes Moscow's participation in the Molotov–Ribbentrop Pact and the Soviet invasion of Finland, and portrays the Soviet Union as a state that was moving towards a democratic model, a Soviet Union committed to internationalism. The book was vague on the guilt or innocence of defendants in the Moscow trials, but the film portrays the defendants in the Moscow trials as guilty in Davies' view. It also showed some of the purges as an attempt by Stalin to rid his country of pro-Axis "fifth columnists". Some "fifth columnists" are described in the film as acting on behalf of Germany and Japan. The film "defends the purges, complete with a quarter-hour dedicated to arguing that Leon Trotsky was a Nazi agent". In the film, Davies proclaims at the end of the trial scene: "Based on twenty years' trial practice, I'd be inclined to believe these confessions."

There are anachronisms in the film—for example, the trials of Mikhail Tukhachevsky (June 1937) and Nikolai Bukharin (March 1938) are depicted as occurring at the same time. Tukhachevsky and Semyon Timoshenko are shown as marshals of the Soviet Union at the same time, but Tukhachevsky was executed in June 1937 and Timoshenko was not made marshal until 1940.

According to film historian Robert Osborne, "At the time this movie was made it had one of the largest casts ever assembled ... was very successful ... When it was shown in Moscow, despite all the good will, people who saw it considered it a comedy—its portrayal of average, everyday life in the Soviet Union apparently way off the mark for 1943". "When the Russian composer Dmitri Shostakovich saw it, he observed that no Soviet propaganda agency would dare to present such outrageous lies."

== Reception ==
Some reviewers despised the film but there have been exceptions. The critic for The New York Times, future McCarthy opponent Bosley Crowther, found the film's attempts to rehabilitate Stalin believable:

Based entirely on the personal observations reported by Mr. Davies in his book, it will obviously prove offensive to those elements which have challenged his views. Particularly will it anger the so-called Trotskyites with its visual re-enactment of the famous "Moscow trials"...For it puts into the record for millions of moviegoers to grasp an admission that the many "purged" generals and other leaders were conspirators in a plot.

=== Box-office ===
Unlike the book it was based on, the film was not a success at the box-office. Although Warner Bros. spent $250,000 advertising the film before its release on April 30, 1943, the company lost around $600,000 overall at the final accounting.

According to Warner Bros records, the film earned $1,017,000 domestically and $632,000 foreign.

Mission to Moscow's numerous factual inaccuracies and outright false portrayals of Soviet leaders and events resulted in criticism from those on both the left and the right of the political spectrum.

The film was nominated for an Academy Award for Best Art Direction-Interior Decoration in a Black-and-White film (Carl Jules Weyl, George James Hopkins).

Later, film critic Leonard Maltin gave the film three and a half stars.

== Controversy ==
The film's pro-Soviet tone was criticized in the United States even at the time of its release. John Dewey wrote an op-ed to The New York Times calling Mission to Moscow "the first instance in our country of totalitarian propaganda for mass consumption--a propaganda which falsifies history through distortion, omission or pure invention of facts." The Republican National Committee called it "New Deal propaganda." At the same time, the film initially had its defenders. Herman Shumlin called the film "an instrument for understanding and friendship between the Allies." Senator Sheridan Downey read a letter from a United States Army sergeant serving in the Italian campaign into the Congressional Record noting that Nazi propaganda he had seen criticized the Soviet Union in similar terms to American critiques of the film.

The House Committee on Un-American Activities would later cite Mission to Moscow as one of three examples of pro-Soviet films made by Hollywood, the other two being The North Star and Song of Russia. It has been called "unquestionably the most blatant piece of pro-Stalinist propaganda ever offered by the American mass media".

In 1950, the film became an object of attention by members of Congress, who saw it as pro-Soviet propaganda. Davies was largely silent on his role in the film, though he did submit a letter to the House Un-American Activities Committee (HUAC) in 1947. Called to testify under oath before Congress, Jack L. Warner at first claimed that the film was made at the request of Davies, who with the approval of FDR had asked Warner Bros. to make the film (this version of the facts was confirmed by Davies' letter as well). He said:

The picture was made when our country was fighting for its existence, with Russia as one of our allies. It was made to fulfill the same wartime purpose for which we made such other pictures as Air Force, This Is the Army...and a great many more. If making Mission to Moscow in 1942 was subversive activity, then the American Liberty ships which carried food and guns to Russian allies and the American naval vessels which convoyed them were likewise engaged in subversive activities. This picture was made only to help a desperate war effort and not for posterity.

Warner later recanted this version, stating that Harry Warner first read Mission to Moscow and then contacted Davies to discuss movie rights.

Mission to Moscow was one of hundreds of pre-1948 Warner Bros. movies sold for television screenings, but was never included in domestic syndication packages put together by its then-owner, United Artists. It had its U.S. TV debut on PBS in the 1970s and has been shown sporadically on Turner Classic Movies, featured in the January 2010 series "Shadows of Russia" and most recently broadcast on May 30, 2024. The film's ownership has returned to Warner Bros. via its purchase of Turner Entertainment and the title made its DVD debut in October, 2009 as part of the Warner Archive Collection.

== See also ==
- Walter Duranty
- Louis Fischer
- Lion Feuchtwanger

== Bibliography ==
- Barmine, Alexander (1945) One Who Survived: The Life Story of a Russian Under the Soviets, New York: G.P. Putnam's Sons; reprinted Read Books (2007). ISBN 1-4067-4207-4, ISBN 978-1-4067-4207-7.
- Bennett, Todd (2001) "Culture, Power, and Mission to Moscow: Film and Soviet-American Relations during World War II", The Journal of American History, Vol. 88, No. 2, pp. 489–518.
- Blahova, Jindriska. "A Merry Twinkle in Stalin's Eye: Eric Johnston, Hollywood, and Eastern Europe." Film History: An International Journal 22.3 (2010): 347–359. online
  - Culbert, David H. "Revisiting a Stalinist Puzzle: Mission to Moscow." American Communist History (2013) 12#2 pp 117–135.
- Culbert, David H. (ed.) (1980) Mission to Moscow, Wisconsin/Warner Bros. Screenplay Series (includes screenplay by Howard Koch), Madison: University of Wisconsin Press. ISBN 0-299-08384-5, ISBN 978-0-299-08384-7.
- Fedorov, Alexander. "Positive image of the USSR and Soviet Characters in American Films in 1943-1945." Journal of Advocacy, Research and Education 1#1 (2015): 33–36. online.
- Kapterev, Sergei. "Illusionary spoils: Soviet attitudes toward American cinema during the early Cold War." Kritika: Explorations in Russian and Eurasian History 10.4 (2009): 779-807 online.
- Sbardellati, John. "Brassbound G-Men and celluloid reds: The FBI's search for communist propaganda in wartime Hollywood." Film History (2008) 20#4: 412–436. online
