= The Captain Hates the Sea =

1934 film by Lewis Milestone

- Directed by: Lewis Milestone
- Screenplay by: Wallace Smith; Arnold Belgard
- Based on: The Captain Hates the Sea; 1933 novel by Wallace Smith
- Produced by: Lewis Milestone
- Starring: Victor McLaglen; Wynne Gibson; Alison Skipworth; John Gilbert; Helen Vinson
- Cinematography: Joseph H. August
- Edited by: Gene Milford
- Distributed by: Columbia Pictures
- Release date: November 2, 1934
- Running time: 92 minutes 85 minutes (Sony Pictures Television Print)
- Country: United States
- Language: English

The Captain Hates the Sea is a 1934 comedy film directed by Lewis Milestone and released by Columbia Pictures. The film, which involves a Grand Hotel-style series of intertwining stories involving the passengers on a cruise ship, was the last feature film of silent film icon John Gilbert and the first Columbia feature to include The Three Stooges (Curly Howard, Moe Howard and Larry Fine) in the cast as the ship's orchestra. The film also stars Victor McLaglen, Arthur Treacher, Akim Tamiroff, Leon Errol and Walter Connolly.

== Plot ==
Alcoholic newspaperman Steve Bramley boards the ship San Capador for a restful cruise, hoping to quit drinking and begin writing a book. Also on board are Steve's friend Schulte, a private detective hoping to nab criminal Danny Checkett with a fortune in stolen bonds. Steve begins drinking, all the while observing the various stories of other passengers on board, several of whom turn out not to be who they seem to be.

== Cast ==
- Victor McLaglen as Junius P. Schulte
- Wynne Gibson as Mrs. Jeddock
- Alison Skipworth as Mrs. Yolanda Magruder
- John Gilbert as Steve Bramley
- Helen Vinson as Janet Grayson
- Fred Keating as Danny Checkett
- Leon Errol as Layton
- Walter Connolly as Captain Helquist
- Tala Birell as Gerta Klangi
- Walter Catlett as Joe Silvers
- John Wray as Mr. Jeddock
- Claude Gillingwater as Judge Griswold
- Emily Fitzroy as Mrs. Victoria Griswold
- Donald Meek as Josephus Bushmills
- Luis Alberni as Juan Gilboa
- Akim Tamiroff as General Salazaro
- Arthur Treacher as Major Warringforth
- Inez Courtney as Flo
- G. Pat Collins as Donlin
- The Three Stooges as Orchestra Musicians

== Production ==
During production, the film went over budget due in large part to the alcohol-fueled partying by Gilbert, McLaglen, Errol, Catlett and Connolly. Harry Cohn, the head of Columbia, became alarmed and sent a cable to Lewis Milestone that read: "Hurry up! The cost is staggering!" Milestone, in turn, sent a cable to Cohn that read: "So is the cast!"

The exterior footage of the San Capeador (filmed at San Pedro Harbor) would be recycled in the Three Stooges' short Dunked in the Deep.

A DVD of The Captain Hates the Sea was released on August 2, 2011, by Sony.
