= For Whom the Bell Tolls (film) =

1943 film by Sam Wood

- Theatrical release poster
- Directed by: Sam Wood
- Screenplay by: Dudley Nichols
- Based on: For Whom the Bell Tolls; 1940 novel by Ernest Hemingway
- Produced by: Sam Wood
- Starring: Gary Cooper; Ingrid Bergman; Akim Tamiroff; Katina Paxinou; Joseph Calleia
- Cinematography: Ray Rennahan
- Edited by: John F. Link Sr.; Sherman Todd
- Music by: Victor Young
- Color process: Technicolor
- Production company: Paramount Pictures
- Distributed by: Paramount Pictures
- Release dates: July 14, 1943 (New York City, premiere)
- Running time: 170 minutes (19 reels)
- Country: United States
- Language: English
- Budget: $3 million
- Box office: $17.8 million (worldwide)

For Whom the Bell Tolls is a 1943 American epic war film produced and directed by Sam Wood and starring Gary Cooper, Ingrid Bergman, Akim Tamiroff, Katina Paxinou and Joseph Calleia. The screenwriter Dudley Nichols based his script on the 1940 novel For Whom the Bell Tolls by American novelist Ernest Hemingway. The film is about an American International Brigades volunteer, Robert Jordan (Cooper), who is fighting in the Spanish Civil War against the fascists. During his desperate mission to blow up a strategically important bridge to protect Republican forces, Jordan falls in love with a young woman guerrilla fighter (Bergman).

For Whom the Bell Tolls was Ingrid Bergman's first Technicolor film. Hemingway's desire for Cooper and Bergman for the leading roles was much publicized, but Paramount initially cast Vera Zorina with Cooper. After shooting footage with Zorina's hair cut short (truer to the novel's character—a shorn head—than Bergman's "look" in the film), she was replaced with Bergman.

For Whom the Bell Tolls was nominated for nine Academy Awards, including Best Picture. The film claimed one win as Katina Paxinou won Best Supporting Actress. Victor Young's soundtrack for the film was the first complete score from an American film to be issued on record.

== Plot ==
During the Spanish Civil War, an American language teacher, Robert Jordan, who lived in Spain during the pre-war period, fights in the International Brigades against Francisco Franco's forces. An experienced dynamiter, Jordan is ordered to travel behind enemy lines and destroy a critical bridge with the aid of a band of local anti-fascist guerrillas. The bridge must be blown up to prevent enemy troops from traveling across it to respond to an upcoming offensive against the fascists.

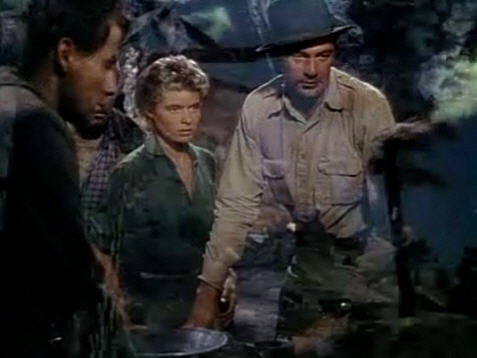
The guerrilla fighters plan their mission.

Jordan meets an old man, Anselmo, who is a guerrilla fighter who will serve as Jordan's liaison with the local guerrilla fighters. Anselmo leads Jordan to a group of Republican guerrillas who are led by a middle-aged man named Pablo. Jordan falls in love with one of the guerrillas, a young woman named María. María's life was shattered by her parents' execution and her gang-rape at the hands of the Falangists (part of the fascist coalition) at the outbreak of the war. Jordan has a strong sense of duty, which clashes with the unwillingness of the guerrilla leader Pablo to commit to helping with the bridge-blowing operation, as it would endanger him and his band. At the same time, Jordan develops a new-found lust for life which arises from his love for María. Pablo's wife Pilar displaces Pablo as the group leader and pledges the guerrillas' allegiance to Jordan's mission. However, when another band of anti-fascist guerrillas, led by El Sordo, is surrounded and killed in a desperate last stand, Pablo destroys Jordan's dynamite detonation equipment, hoping to prevent the bridge demolition and thereby avoid fascist reprisals on his camp. Later, Pablo regrets abandoning his comrades and returns to assist in the operation.

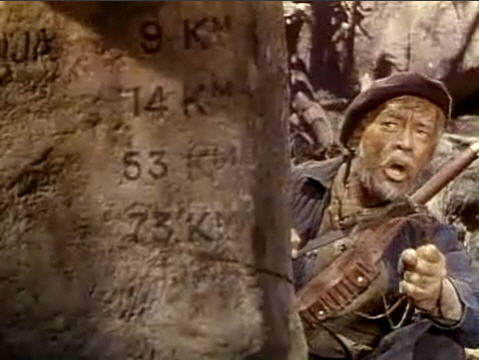
The old man Anselmo (played by Vladimir Sokoloff), who acts as Robert Jordan's guide.

However, the enemy, apprised of the coming offensive, has prepared to ambush the Republicans in force and it seems unlikely that blowing up the bridge will do much to prevent a rout. Regardless, Jordan understands that he must still demolish the bridge in an attempt to prevent fascist reinforcements from overwhelming his allies. Lacking the equipment destroyed by Pablo, Jordan and Anselmo improvise an alternative method to explode the dynamite by using hand grenades. Jordan attaches wires to the grenades so that their pins can be pulled from a distance. This improvised plan is considerably more dangerous than using conventional detonators, because the men must increase their proximity to the explosion.

While the guerrilla fighters—Pablo, Pilar, and María—create a diversion for Jordan and Anselmo, the two men plant and detonate the dynamite, costing Anselmo his life when he is hit by a piece of debris from the falling bridge. While the guerrillas are escaping on horseback, Jordan is maimed when a fascist tank shoots his horse out from under him. Jordan cannot feel his legs and he knows that if his comrades stop to rescue him, they too will be captured or killed. He bids goodbye to María and ensures that she escapes to safety with the surviving guerrillas. Armed with a Lewis machine gun, he waits until the horse-mounted fascist soldiers appear in his gun sights. He then pulls the trigger, firing a sweeping barrage at the oncoming soldiers. The film ends with Jordan firing the Lewis gun directly at the camera.

== Cast ==
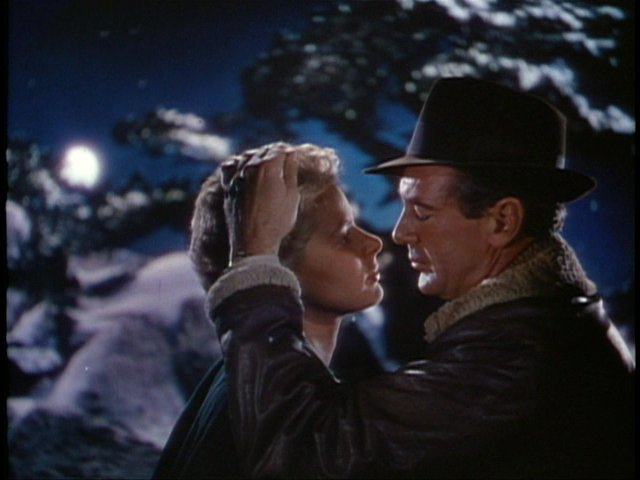
Guerrilla fighters Robert Jordan (Cooper) and Maria (Bergman) embrace.

- Gary Cooper as Robert Jordan
- Ingrid Bergman as María
- Akim Tamiroff as Pablo
- Arturo de Córdova as Agustín
- Vladimir Sokoloff as Anselmo, the guide
- Mikhail Rasumny as Rafael, the gypsy
- Fortunio Bonanova as Fernando
- Eric Feldary as Andrés, the courier
- Victor Varconi as Primitivo, the lookout
- Joseph Calleia as El Sordo
- Lilo Yarson as Joaquin
- Katina Paxinou as Pilar
- Alexander Granach as Paco
- Adia Kuznetzoff as Gustavo
- Leonid Snegoff as Ignacio
- Leo Bulgakov as General Golz
- Duncan Renaldo as Lieutenant Berrendo
- Frank Puglia as Captain Gomez
- Pedro de Cordoba as Colonel Miranda
- Michael Visaroff as Staff Officer
- Martin Garralaga as Captain Mora
- Jean Del Val as The Sniper
- John Mylong as Colonel Duval
- Feodor Chaliapin Jr. as Kashkin

== Production ==
Paramount Pictures initially cast actress Vera Zorina opposite Cooper before replacing her with Bergman. The day's papers described the recasting: Paramount "compromised on Zorina's hair, cutting it to two inches; the rest of the makeup was true to the book. The results were shown to Paramount executives. They gasped. 'No glamour,' they explained. 'She looks like a dishrag.' Sam Wood, producer-director, sighed. 'The part doesn't call for glamour,' he tried to explain. 'Well, she ought to have glamour without looking like it.' They tried it. They put caps on Zorina's teeth, touched up her facial makeup with a bit of mascara here and there, tailored the baggy pants to a slim hip, and gave the shirt an uplift. She looked more like the lovely Zorina but not at all like the hapless 'Maria.' They gave up. Miss Bergman was tested for the part. The tests were made with her hair long and the executives beamed. She looked glamorous. Tomorrow they will cut her hair short. They will dress her in baggy pants and a formless shirt. After that, no one knows."

=== Restoration ===
The film was originally released in a roadshow format, at 170 minutes (not counting intermission). For re-release, it was trimmed to 134 minutes, and it was not seen at its full length until the mid-1990s, when it was restored to almost original duration. A 166-minute version was released on VHS in 1995. A 168-minute version has been released on DVD. The restoration was photochemical, not digital, and the titles and some of the scenes in the early reels are slightly to significantly out-of-register.

== Reception ==
For Whom the Bell Tolls was the second-highest-grossing film of 1943, earning $6.3 million in distributor rentals in the United States and Canada. A re-issue in 1957 earned an additional $800,000. When adjusted for inflation and the size of the population when released, it ranks among the top 100 popular movies of all time at the domestic box office.

For Whom the Bell Tolls holds a 69% rating on Rotten Tomatoes based on 16 reviews. Review aggregation website Metacritic, which uses a weighted average, assigned the film a score of 68 out of 100, based on 10 critics, indicating "generally favorable" reviews.

== Accolades ==
=== 16th Academy Awards ===
Wins

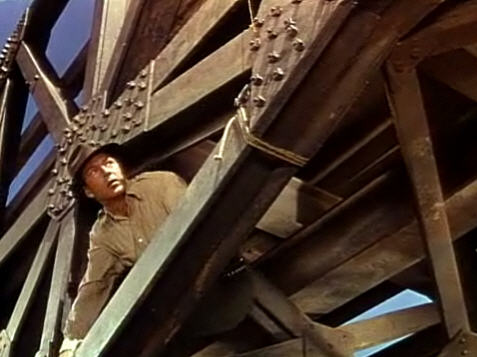
Robert Jordan (Cooper) rigs the bridge with explosives.

- Best Supporting Actress: Katina Paxinou

Nominations

- Outstanding Picture: Paramount
- Best Actor: Gary Cooper
- Best Actress: Ingrid Bergman
- Best Actor in a Supporting Role: Akim Tamiroff
- Best Cinematography (Color): Ray Rennahan
- Best Art Direction (Color): Art Direction: Hans Dreier, Haldane Douglas; Interior Decoration: Bertram Granger
- Best Film Editing: Sherman Todd, John F. Link Sr.
- Best Music (Music Score of a Dramatic or Comedy Picture): Victor Young

=== 1st Golden Globe Awards ===
Wins

- Best Performance by an Actress in a Supporting Role – Motion Picture: Katina Paxinou
- Best Performance by an Actor in a Supporting Role – Motion Picture: Akim Tamiroff

== Other versions ==
There was a one-hour Lux Radio Theatre version broadcast on February 12, 1945, which retained the principal cast from the film: Gary Cooper, Ingrid Bergman, and Akim Tamiroff.

== See also ==
- List of Spanish Civil War films
