= Caveman (disambiguation) =

A caveman is a popular stylized characterization of how early humans or hominids looked and behaved. A cave dweller is a real human being who lives in a cave or under a cliff.

Caveman and/or cavemen may also refer to:

== Characters ==
- Caveman (The Hitchhiker's Guide to the Galaxy), a character from The Hitchhiker's Guide to the Galaxy
- GEICO Cavemen, characters in a series of commercials and a short-lived television program
- Unfrozen Caveman Lawyer, Saturday Night Live character played by Phil Hartman
- Caveman, nickname given to Stanley Yelnats IV from Holes (novel)

== Computer games and applications ==
- CAVEman, a 4D high-resolution model of a functioning human elaborated by University of Calgary
- Caveman Ughlympics, a 1988 computer game ported for NES (like Caveman Game )
- Caveman (skateboarding), a skateboarding trick

== Film and TV ==
- The Caveman (1915 film), a lost 1915 silent film comedy
- The Caveman (1926 film), a 1926 film
- Caveman (film), a 1981 film featuring Ringo Starr, Barbara Bach and Dennis Quaid
- Cavemen (film), a 2013 American comedy film
- Cavemen (TV series), a television series on ABC network
- Cavemen (Misseri Studio), a Russian segment of Sesame Street

== Music ==
- Caveman (American band), an American indie rock band
- The Cavemen (band), a Nigerian highlife band
- Caveman (group), a British hip hop group
- "Caveman", the fifteenth movement of Mike Oldfield's Tubular Bells 2003 album
- Caveman, a song by The Cockroaches from the 1988 album: Fingertips

== Nicknames ==
=== People ===
- "L'Homme des Cavernes" (fr. "The Caveman"), nickname for Sébastien Chabal, a French rugby union player
- "Caveman", nickname for Don Robinson
- "The Caveman", nickname for Kevin Shirley, a South African music producer
- Jonathan "Caveman" Williams, victim of the John McDonogh High School shooting

=== Schools in the United States ===
- Carlsbad High School (Carlsbad, New Mexico)
- Grants Pass High School, Oregon
- Mishawaka High School, Indiana

== Other uses ==
- Maropeng Cavemen, South Africa field hockey club

== See also ==
- Cavewoman, a 1993-2009 American comic book series
- Cavegirl, a 2002-03 British TV series
- Troglodyte (disambiguation)
- Man cave
