= The Widow (1955 film) =

1955 film by Lewis Milestone

- Theatrical release poster
- Italian: La vedova X
- Directed by: Lewis Milestone
- Screenplay by: Louis Stevens; Corrado Sofia; Giuseppe Mangione
- Story by: Lewis Milestone; Louis Stevens
- Based on: La Vedova by Susan York
- Produced by: John G. Nasht; Giorgio Venturini
- Starring: Patricia Roc; Massimo Serato
- Cinematography: Arturo Gallea
- Edited by: Loris Bellero
- Music by: Mario Nascimbene
- Production companies: Express Films; Produzioni Venturini
- Distributed by: Venturini Film
- Release dates: 1 August 1955 (Italy); 4 June 1959 (France)
- Running time: 95 minutes
- Countries: Italy; France
- Language: Italian

The Widow (Italian: La vedova X) is a 1955 romantic drama film directed by Lewis Milestone and written by Milestone and Louis Stevens, based on the novel La Vedova by Susan York. The film had a theatrical release in Italy in 1955, limited release in the United States in 1957, and was released in France on 4 June 1959 under the title La Veuve. This was the last Milestone film involving his own writing.

== Plot ==
Countess Diana Gaston (Patricia Roc) meets Vittorio Serra (Massimo Serato), the grandson of Carlo Serra, a prominent businessman. Convinced that she has met the man for her, she does all she can to keep him in her life. Unfortunately, both of them are self-centered and this leads to repeated conflict. Vittorio's passion for auto racing leads to continued disagreements between him and the countess.

Though civil, they separate over their disagreements, despite each believing they cannot live without the other. When Vittorio attends a party thrown by the countess, he meets Adriana (Anna Maria Ferrero), who immediately falls in love with him. His indecision over Adriana's attentions causes her to try to make him jealous, but he does not fall for the ploy. During a trip to Sicily, Vittorio learns Diana and Adriana have been corresponding, which finally stirs his jealousy. Even though he loves the countess more, Vittorio asks Adriana to marry him. She refuses. When Diana learns of his proposal, she throws a tantrum and breaks objects precious to Vittirio, objects which she knows he superstitiously depends upon for luck.

Vittrio then learns that out of spite, Adriana has married Bonelli (Leonardo Botta), his friend and fellow auto racer. About to compete against Bonneli in a race, and distraught at the news of the marriage, Vittorio removes his lucky bracelet. Diana has a premonition of bad fortune just before she learns the news that Vittorio has died in a racing crash.

== Cast ==
- Patricia Roc as Countess Diana Gaston
- Massimo Serato as Vittorio Serra
- Anna Maria Ferrero as Adriana
- Leonardo Botta as Leonardo Botta
- Akim Tamiroff as Uncle Carlo Serra

== Background ==
Lewis Milestone was affected by blacklisting during the 1950s and found it difficult to find work. He and his wife went to Paris to wait out the "red scare". While working abroad, Lewis Milestone and Diana Vedova directed La Vedova X as a joint British-Italian production. This film followed upon his work in England on Melba in 1953 and They Who Dare in 1954. This marked the last Milestone film involving his own writing. When he returned to the United States, he had to "scrape by" directing episodes for television series such as Alfred Hitchcock Presents, Schlitz Playhouse, Suspicion, and Have Gun – Will Travel, before directing Pork Chop Hill in 1959.

== Reception ==
Cinematografo wrote that the plot was unoriginal and uninteresting, and that Lewis Milestone's connection with the film was not enough to overcome its many flaws.

== Release notes ==
While IMDb shows the film release year as being 1959, The New York Times , Rovi, The British Film Institute and the 1987 book "World Film Directors: 1890–1945" show the release year as 1955. While 1954 is shown as a release date in the Joseph R. Millichap book "Lewis Milestone", news reports in June 1954 spoke toward Milestone "about to direct" or "currently producing and directing" the film under its working title of The Black Widow, and the British Film Institute was writing in 1954 "Lewis Milestone is to start work soon on The Black Widow, with Patricia Roc..." 1954 appears to mark the beginning of production, with 1955 as the correct release year of the film in Italy, a U.S. release in 1957, and 1959 as reported on IMDb coinciding with the film's later French release.
