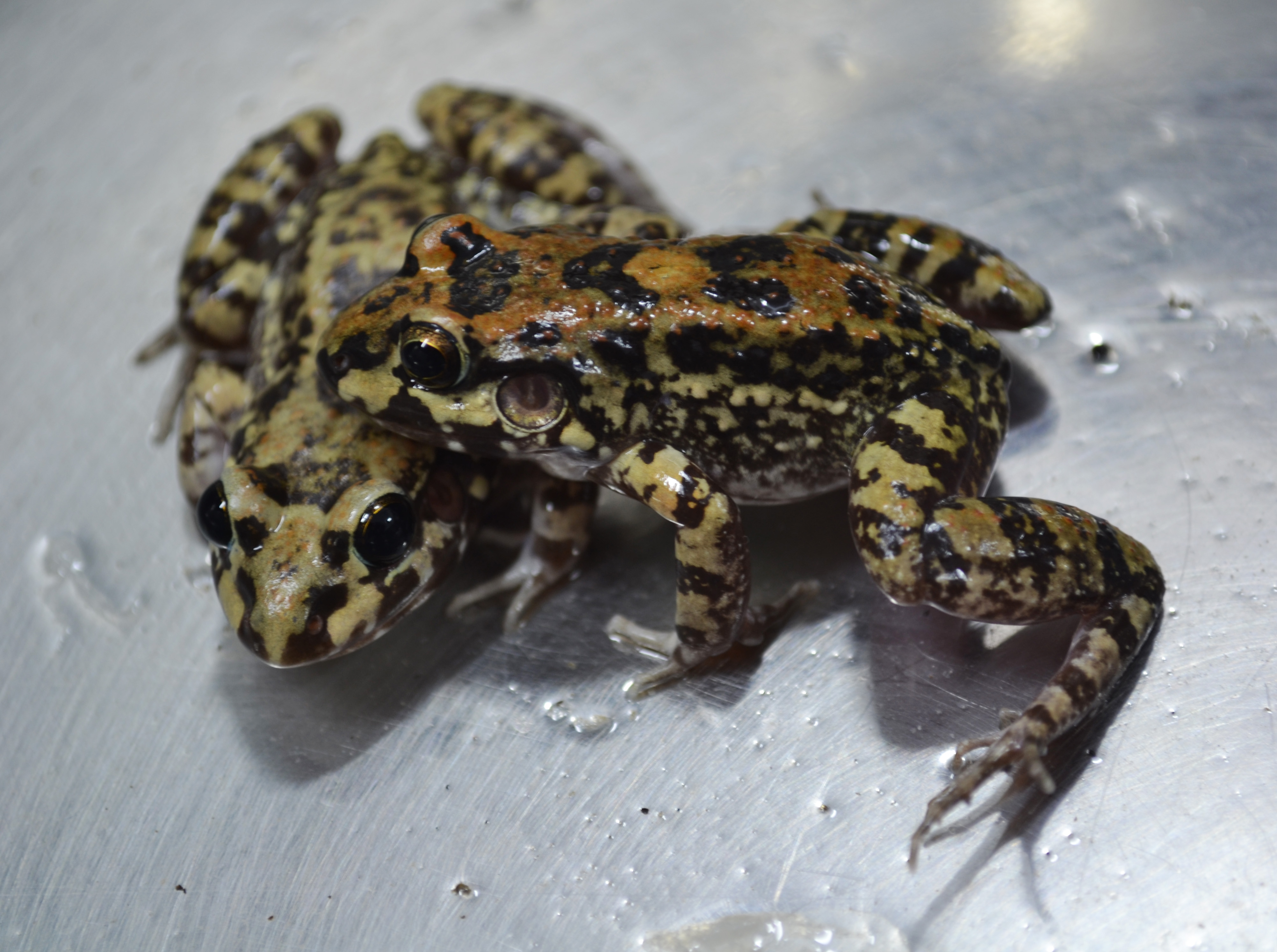

Conservation status
- Least Concern (IUCN 3.1)

Scientific classification
- Kingdom: Animalia
- Phylum: Chordata
- Class: Amphibia
- Order: Anura
- Family: Leptodactylidae
- Genus: Leptodactylus
- Species: L. troglodytes

Binomial name
- Leptodactylus troglodytes Lutz, 1926

= Leptodactylus troglodytes =

Species of amphibian

Leptodactylus troglodytes (common names: Pernambuco white-lipped frog, hole-dwelling thin-toed frog, sibilator frog) is a species of frogs in the family Leptodactylidae. It is endemic to northeastern Brazil and occurs from northern Minas Gerais and Bahia to Maranhão, Piauí, Ceará, and Rio Grande do Norte. The specific name, troglodytes, refers to its habit of breeding in underground chambers.

== Description ==
Adult males measure 46–53 mm (1.8–2.1 in) and adult females 45–53 mm (1.8–2.1 in) in snout–vent length. The tympanum is distinct. Males have more acuminate snout than females. Dorsal folds are absent and dorsolateral folds are indistinct or (usually) absent; lateral folds are also absent or interrupted. The belly is uniformly light.

The tadpoles grow to 43 mm (1.7 in) in total length (Gosner stage 36).

== Reproduction ==
This species builds foam nests in underground chambers near water. Single tunnel may have multiple chambers. Males are territorial and emit territorial as well as courtship calls, to which the female may reciprocate.

== Habitat and conservation ==
Leptodactylus troglodytes is a common species that occurs in dry and moist savanna and agricultural land in the Cerrado and Caatinga ecosystems and in dune systems in Atlantic Rainforest zone. It is impacted by intensive agriculture, overgrazing by livestock, and fire, but is not considered threatened as species. It has been observed in many protected areas.
