= Seven Sinners =

Seven Sinners can refer to:

- Seven Sinners (1925 film), an early film by Lewis Milestone
- Seven Sinners (1936 film), a British thriller
- Seven Sinners (1940 film), starring Marlene Dietrich and John Wayne
- 7 Sinners, an album by Helloween
