= Russian War Relief =

Russian War Relief (RWR) (also known as the Russian War Relief Fund and the American Committee for Russian War Relief) was the largest American agency for foreign war relief. It had the "express and exclusive purpose of giving succor to the Russian people at a time of crisis." The organization was a front organization for the USSR.

== Organizational history ==
On July 29, 1941, one month after Germany's attack on Russia, a group met in New York. This effort led to the formal establishment of Russian War Relief, Inc. (RWR) in New York on September 12, 1941. The group had headquarters located at 535 Fifth Avenue in New York City.

The organization launched its fundraising drive with a mass meeting held at Madison Square Garden on October 27, 1941.

In addition to fundraising to provide medical supplies and humanitarian aid to the people of Soviet Russia, RWR conducted a public education mission to build support for the war effort. Late in 1941 the film Our Russian Front was produced, featuring war footage from the Eastern front. The movie, produced by director Lewis Milestone and documentary filmmaker Joris Ivens, featured narration by Walter Huston and was displayed in theaters to a paying audience. The film premiered on February 11, 1942.

In 1942, actor Charlie Chaplin gave a speech at a meeting of the organization in San Francisco, where he called for the opening of a second front against Germany.

== Aid distributed ==
A wide array of medical and humanitarian aid was provided to the Russian war effort by Russian War Relief. Some products distributed during the first year of the war included typhus and malaria medication, hospital field tents, x-ray film, surgical implements, sterilization equipment, and artificial sweetener.

== Intelligence operations ==
Russian War Relief was a front organization for the USSR with ties to Soviet Intelligence agents. Saville Sax was introduced to Soviet agents by his mother, Bluma, who worked for Russian War Relief. Sax was roommates with Theodore Hall who worked on the Manhattan Project. Sax recruited Hall who gave a detailed description of the "Fat Man" plutonium bomb, and of several processes for purifying plutonium, to Soviet intelligence.

== Officials ==
Fred Myers, who later founded the Humane Society of the United States (HSUS), served as director of public relations and was later promoted to Executive Director. The chairman of Russian War Relief was Edward C. Carter, chairman of the National Committee for Medical Aid to the Soviet Union, a member of the Executive Committee of the American Russian Institute, and secretary general of the Institute of Pacific Relations.

From 1942, the fund was headed by Allen Wardwell.

== See also ==
- Our Russian Front
