= Our Russian Front =

1942 film

- Lobby card
- Directed by: Joris Ivens; Lewis Milestone
- Written by: Elliot Paul
- Produced by: Joris Ivens; Lewis Milestone
- Narrated by: Walter Huston
- Cinematography: Roman Karmen; Ivan Belyakov; Dmitri Rymarev; Arkadi Shafran; Mark Troyanovsky; Vladimir Yeshurin
- Edited by: Marcel Craven; Albert Nalpas
- Production company: Russian War Relief Inc.
- Distributed by: Artkino Pictures
- Release date: February 11, 1942
- Running time: 45 minutes
- Country: United States
- Language: English

Our Russian Front is a 1942 American documentary film directed by Joris Ivens and Lewis Milestone, and narrated by Walter Huston to promote support for the Soviet Union's war effort.

== Film ==
In production before America entered World War II, the film was completed several weeks after the Japanese attack on Pearl Harbor, having gone through frantic last minute updates to ensure it meeting its February 1942 release date. Joris Ivens anticipated that editing might take a week, but stated that Hollywood [sic] "fiddled with it for two months and unrecognizably altered the original version." Walter Huston narrates a World War II documentary intended to bolster United States support for the USSR's war efforts. Created using front line footage taken by Russian battlefield cameramen, and archive footage of Averell Harriman, Joseph Stalin, and Semyon Timoshenko, the film was edited in the US. Upon release, the film screened for more than 20 hours a day and broke all previous box office records at the Rialto Theater in Times Square.

== Reception ==
The New York Times reports that "the greatest battle in history" was assembled by Lewis Milestone and Joris Ivens into a "tersely contemporary document". They note that it did not rank favorably when compared to "great documentaries" because its commentary was uninspired, and it attempted to crowd too much within a timeframe of 40 minutes, resulting in it being only "a synoptic account of the Russian war effort". They granted that as a record of the Russian people's struggle, "it is a heartening account," and communicated the "urgency of this urgent moment." The reviewer noted that the film was a picture of total war, from the bayonets and shells of the front lines, to the efforts of the peasants and laborers and scientists struggling to support the war effort, sharing that in such circumstances, there are "no 'noncombatants' in this war."

In the New York Daily News, reviewer Dorothy Masters noted that while "scenes of actual combat are few and far between" the film nevertheless provided "a fairly comprehensive outline of activity behind the front, with the home guard assembling for detail, guerrillas getting their secret orders, the hurried harvesting and storing of grain, old Cossacks getting back into saddle, replacement of women on tractors and in the factories, and care of infants not yet old enough to take their places in the machinery of war."

In Russians in Hollywood, Hollywood's Russians: biography of an image, author Harlow Robinson writes that of the several pro-Soviet documentaries made in Hollywood, the most important were Our Russian Front, directed in 1942 by Lewis Milestone for Artkino Pictures and Russian War Relief, and The Battle of Russia, directed in 1943 by Anatole Litvak and Frank Capra as part of the Why We Fight series.

== See also ==
- Russian War Relief
