= Allen Wardwell =

American lawyer (1873–1953)

Allen Wardwell (1873–1953), was an American attorney and banking law expert who was the vice president of the American-Russian Chamber of Commerce in 1929, and a name partner of Davis Polk & Wardwell.

== Education ==
Wardwell graduated from Yale University in 1895 and was a member of Scroll and Key Society. He also graduated from Harvard Law School.

== Career ==
Wardwell served as a major in the American Red Cross in Russia. He was a member of the Active Campaign Committee of the American Society for the Control of Cancer when it received an unconditional gift of $100,000 from John D. Rockefeller Jr. for its congress at Lake Mohonk in 1926. Wardwell accompanied W. Averell Harriman in his mission to Moscow in 1941, then headed Russian War Relief Inc. in 1942. From 1943 to 1945, he was the president of the New York City Bar Association.
