= Lewis Milestone =

Russian-American filmmaker (1895–1980)

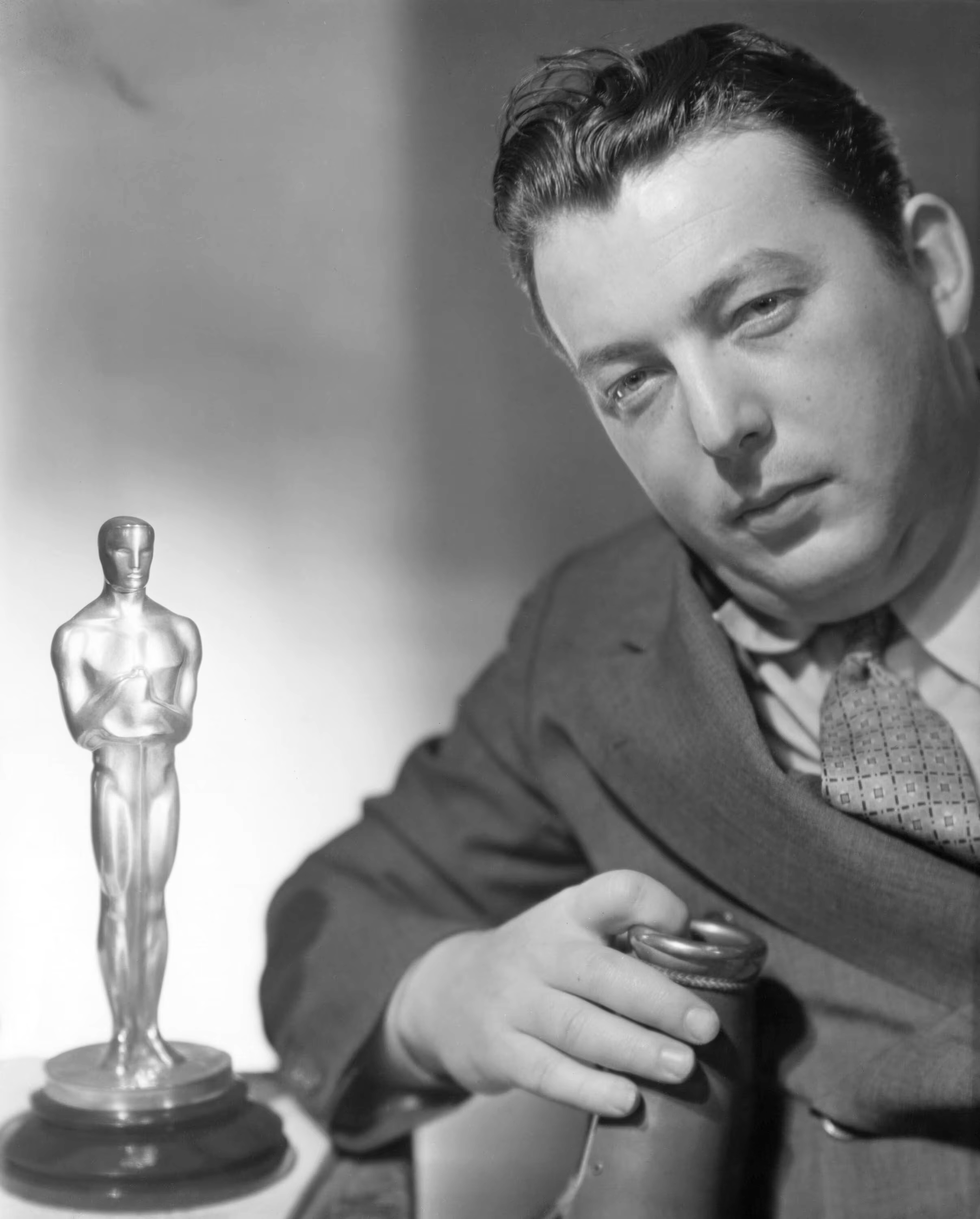
- Milestone with his Academy Award for Best Comedic Director in 1929
- Born: Leib Mendelevich Milstein; September 30, 1895; Kishinev, Bessarabia Governorate, Russian Empire
- Died: September 25, 1980 (aged 84); Los Angeles, California, U.S.
- Citizenship: Russia (until 1919); United States (from 1919)
- Occupations: Film director; producer; screenwriter
- Years active: 1915–1964
- Spouse: Kendall Lee (m. 1935; died 1978)

Lewis Milestone (born Leib Mendelevich Milstein; (Note: Russian: Лейб Менделевич Мильштейн, romanized: Leyb Mendelevich Mil'shteyn.) September 30, 1895 – September 25, 1980) was a Russian-American film director, screenwriter, and producer active during the Golden Age of Hollywood. He twice won the Academy Award for Best Director, for Two Arabian Knights (1927) and All Quiet on the Western Front (1930), with a third nomination for The Front Page (1931).

Milestone's other notable directing credits included The General Died at Dawn (1936), Of Mice and Men (1939), The North Star (1943), A Walk in the Sun (1945), The Strange Love of Martha Ivers (1946), Pork Chop Hill (1959), Ocean's 11 (1960), and his final film Mutiny on the Bounty (1962).

== Early life ==
Leib (or Lev) Milstein was born in Kishinev, the capital of Bessarabia Governorate in the Russian Empire (present-day Chișinău, Moldova), into a wealthy, distinguished family of Jewish heritage. Milstein received his primary education at Jewish schools, reflecting his parents' liberal social and political orientation, and including a study of several languages. Milstein's family discouraged his early love of theater and his desire to follow the dramatic arts and dispatched him to Mittweida, Saxony, to study engineering.

After neglecting his classes to attend local theater productions, Milstein failed his coursework. He was intent on pursuing a theatrical career and bought a one-way ticket to the United States. Milstein arrived in Hoboken, New Jersey, on November 14, 1913, shortly after his eighteenth birthday.

Milstein, who found difficulty supporting himself in New York City, worked as a janitor, door-to-door salesman, and lace-machine operator before finding a position as a portrait-and-theater photographer in 1915. In 1917, shortly after the US entered World War I, he enlisted in the Army Signal Corps. Milstein was stationed in New York City and Washington, D.C., and was assigned to the corps' photography unit, where he trained in aerial photography, assisted on training films, and edited documentary combat footage. His cohorts in the Signal Corps included future Hollywood directors Josef von Sternberg and Victor Fleming. In February 1919, Milstein was discharged from the army, immediately obtained US citizenship, and legally changed his surname to Milestone. An acquaintance from the Signal Corps, Jesse D. Hampton, now an independent film producer, secured Milestone an entry-level position as an assistant editor in Hollywood.

=== Hollywood apprenticeship 1919–1924 ===
When Milestone arrived in Hollywood, he was still in financial difficulties. He later said to sustain himself until his studio job commenced, he briefly worked as a card dealer at a Los Angeles City Oil Field gambling venue.

Milestone accepted mundane assignments from Hampton at $20 per week, and progressed from assistant editor toward director. In 1920, he was chosen as general assistant to director Henry King at Pathé Exchange. Milestone's first credited work was as an assistant on King's film Dice of Destiny.

During the next six years, Milestone "took on jobs in any capacity available" in the Hollywood film industry, working as editor for director-producer Thomas Ince, as general assistant and co-author on film scripts by William A. Seiter, and as a gag writer for comedian Harold Lloyd. In 1923, Milestone followed Seiter to Warner Brothers studios as assistant director on Little Church Around the Corner (1923), completing most of the film-making tasks on the production. Milestone's reputation as an effective "film doctor" who was skilled at salvaging movies led Warner to begin offering Milestone's services to other studios at inflated rates.

== Director: Silent era, 1925–1929 ==
By 1925, Milestone was writing screen treatments for films at Universal and Warner studios, among them The Mad Whirl, Dangerous Innocence, The Teaser, and Bobbed Hair. The same year, Milestone approached Jack L. Warner with a proposal: Milestone would provide the producer with a story free of charge if he was allowed to direct it. Warner agreed to sponsor Milestone's directorial debut, Seven Sinners (1925).

Seven Sinners is one of three films Milestone directed with Marie Prevost, Mack Sennett, and a former female comedian. Jack Warner appointed Darryl F. Zanuck as a screenwriter. The film is a "semi-sophisticated" comedy incorporating elements of slapstick, and was sufficiently successful with critics and the public to allow Milestone, now 29 years old, additional directing assignments.

Milestone's second Prevost comedy was The Caveman (1926), which quickly earned him praise for its "adroit direction". During production, Milestone broke his contract with the studio over his exploitation as a "film doctor": Warners sued for damages and won, forcing Milestone to file for bankruptcy. The Caveman was his last film for Warner Bros. until Edge of Darkness (1943). Undeterred, Paramount Pictures quickly acquired Milestone.

The New Klondike (1926), a sports-themed drama based on a Ring Lardner story, was filmed on location in Florida. Despite a "lukewarm" response from critics, Paramount was enthusiastic regarding Milestone's prospects, showcasing him with other young studio talent in the promotional film Fascinating Youth (1926). An argument with screen star Gloria Swanson on the set of Fine Manners (1926) led Milestone to walk off the project, leaving director Richard Rosson to complete it.

Two Arabian Knights (1927), which is considered Milestone's most outstanding work during the silent era, was inspired by the Anderson–Stallings stage play What Price Glory? (1924), and director Raoul Walsh's 1924 screen adaptation of it. It was the first film in a four-year contract with Howard Hughes' The Caddo Company and is Milestone's only film of 1927. The film garnered Milestone an Academy Award for best comedy direction in 1927, prevailing over Charlie Chaplin's The Circus (1928). During World War I, doughboys William Boyd and Louis Wolheim, and love-object Mary Astor form a comic triangle.

The Garden of Eden (1928) was made under a Caddo releasing agreement with Universal Pictures. The film was "a variation on the Cinderella story ... of acidic sophistication", and was adapted by screenwriter Hans Kraly; it resembles, in both script and visual production, the works of Ernst Lubitsch. The project benefited from the lavish sets William Cameron Menzies designed and the cinematography of John Arnold. The film stars Corinne Griffith. Milestone's cinematic rendering of Two Arabian Knights and The Garden of Eden established him as a skilled practitioner of "rough and sophisticated" comedy.

Milestone was wary of being stereotyped as a comedy director, and he shifted to an emerging genre director, Josef von Sternberg, popularized with his gangland fantasy Underworld (1927). The Racket, a "taut and realistic" depiction of a mobster-controlled police department, distinguished Milestone as a capable director of the genre, but its reception was lessened by a flood of inferior gangster films in the late 1920s. The Racket was nominated for Best Picture at the 1928 Academy Awards.

== Early sound era: 1929–1936 ==
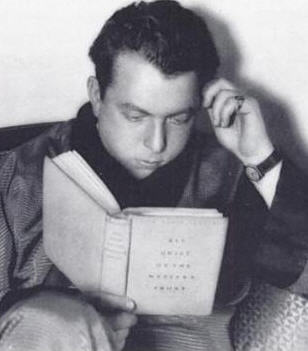
Milestone during the filming of All Quiet on the Western Front, 1930

=== New York Nights (1929) ===
Milestone's first sound production New York Nights proved inauspicious. The film was a vehicle for silent screen icon Norma Talmadge—whose spouse was producer Joseph Schenck. Milestone attempted to accommodate United Artists' desire to blend the "show-biz" and gangster genres in an adaptation of "the justly forgotten" Broadway production Tin Pan Alley. According to Chanham, New York Nights "gave little indication of Milestone's ability in adapting to sound techniques". According to film historian Joseph Millichap:

In several ways New York Nights is best considered with Milestone's silent efforts, as it seems an obviously unimportant transitional piece. Like many early sound films it is shot from a few camera settings, and it is full of static scenes in which the cast is all too obviously speaking into hidden microphones. Milestone was so displeased with the final cut that he asked to have his name removed from the credits ... the film is not worth considering as Milestone's first sound work.

=== All Quiet on the Western Front (1930) ===
Milestone's anti-war picture All Quiet on the Western Front is widely recognized as his directorial masterpiece, and as one of the most-compelling dramatizations of soldiers in combat during the Great War. The film was adapted from Erich Maria Remarque's 1929 eponymous novel. Milestone cinematically conveyed the "grim realism and anti-war themes" that characterize the novel. Universal Studios' head of production Carl Laemmle Jr. purchased the film rights to capitalize on the international success of Remarque's book. According to Strago (2017):

When he was preparing to shoot his wrenching anti-war film All Quiet on the Western Front from the point of view of German schoolboys who become soldiers, Universal co-founder and president Carl Laemmle pleaded with him for a "happy ending." Milestone replied, "I've got your happy ending. We'll let the Germans win the war."

All Quiet on the Western Front presents the war from the perspective of a unit of patriotic, young, German soldiers who become disillusioned with the horrors of trench warfare. Actor Lew Ayres portrays the naïve, sensitive youth, Paul Baumer. According to Thompson (2015), Milestone—who was uncredited—together with screenwriters Maxwell Anderson, Del Andrews, and George Abbott, wrote a script that "reproduces the terse, tough dialogue" of Remarque's novel to "expose war for what it is, and not glorify it". Originally conceived as a silent film, Milestone filmed both a silent and a talkie version, shooting them together in sequence.

The most significant technical innovation of All Quiet on the Western Front is Milestone's integration of the era's rudimentary sound technology with the advanced visual effects developed during the late silent era. Applying post-synchronization of the sound recordings, Milestone was at liberty to "shoot the way we've always shot ... it was that simple. All the tracking shots were done with a silent camera". In one of the film's most-disturbing sequences, Milestone used tracking shots and sound effects to graphically show the effects of artillery and machine guns on advancing troops.

The movie met with critical and popular approval, and it won the Academy Award for Best Picture and earned the Milestone Academy Award for Best Director. All Quiet on the Western Front established Milestone as a talent in the film industry; Howard Hughes rewarded him with an adaptation of Ben Hecht's and Charles MacArthur's 1928 play The Front Page.

=== The Front Page (1931) ===
The Front Page, in which Milestone depicted backroom denizens of Chicago newspaper tabloids, is considered one of the most influential films of 1931 and introduced the Hollywood archetype of the experienced, fast-talking reporter. The film's script retains the "sparkling dialogue [and] hard, fast and ruthless pace" of Ben Hecht's and Charles MacArthur's 1928 stage production. The Front Page began the 1930s journalism genre, which other studios imitated, and several remakes—including Howard Hawks' His Girl Friday and Billy Wilder's The Front Page (1974)—appeared.

Milestone was disappointed with the casting of Pat O'Brien as reporter "Hildy" Johnson; he wanted to cast James Cagney or Clark Gable in the role but producer Howard Hughes vetoed this choice in favor of O'Brien, who had performed in the Chicago stage production of The Front Page.

According to Biographer Charles Higham (1973), "The Front Page surpasses All Quiet on the Western Front in being wholly a masterpiece, and one of the greatest pictures of the period. Milestone achieved a perfect marriage of film and theater. The picture has a vividness not matched in a newspaper subject until Citizen Kane"

According to Joseph Millichap:

Milestone employs "several framing devices, a quick cross-cutting between scenes, a moving camera intercut with close-ups, juxtaposition of angles and distances, and a number of trick shots ... Overall, the deft combination of Realistic mise-en-scene with an Expressionistic camera draws the best out of the realistic, melodramatic and comedic elements of the original [play] ... creating the most cinematically interesting, if not the most entertaining, version of The Front Page.

Milestone's technique is demonstrated in the opening tracking shots of the newspaper's printing plant, and the confrontation between Molly Malloy (Mae Clarke) and a throng of reporters. The Front Page received a Best Picture nomination at the Academy Awards, and a Film Daily poll of 300 movie critics listed Milestone among "The Ten Best Directors".

=== 1932–1936 ===
Milestone was troubled by film directors' declining control within the studio system and supported King Vidor's proposal to organize a filmmakers' cooperative. Supporters for a Screen Directors Guild included Frank Borzage, Howard Hawks, Ernst Lubitsch, Rouben Mamoulian, and William Wellman, among others. By 1938, the guild was incorporated, representing 600 directors and assistant directors.

In the mid-1930s, Paramount Pictures was experiencing a financial crisis that inhibited the commitments to European film stylists such as Josef von Sternberg, Ernst Lubitsch, and Milestone. Under these conditions, Milestone experienced difficulty in locating compelling literary material, production support and proper casting. The first among these films is Rain.

Allied Artists assigned Milestone rising star Joan Crawford, who was known for her silent film roles as a flapper, to play prostitute Sadie Thompson. Crawford expressed disappointment with her interpretation of the role. Milestone was not yet affected by the Production Code, and his portrayal of the overwrought Puritan missionary Reverend Davidson (Walter Huston), his rape of Thompson blends violence with sexual and religious symbolism using swift cutting. The film was termed "slow and stage-bound" and "stiff and stagey". Milestone said of Rain:

I thought [audiences] were ready for a dramatic form; that now we could present a three-act play on the screen. But I was wrong. People will not listen to narrative dialogue. They will not accept the kind of exposition you use on the stage. I started the picture slowly, too slowly, I'm afraid. You can't start a picture slowly. You must show things happening.

Hallelujah, I'm a Bum, which was released during the Great Depression, was an attempt by United Artists to reintroduce singer Al Jolson after his three-year hiatus from film roles. The film is based on a Ben Hecht story, with a score by Rodgers and Hart featuring "rhythmic dialogue" delivered in song-song; its sentimental, romantic theme of a New York City tramp was received with indifference and dismay by moviegoers. Film historian Joseph Millichap observed that "the problem of this entertainment fantasy was that it brushed aside just enough reality to confuse its audience. Americans in the winter of 1933 were not in the mood to be advised that the life of a hobo was the road to true happiness, especially by a star earning $25,000 a week." Milestone's effort to make a "socially conscious" musical was generally ill-received at its New York opening and he had difficulty finding a more serious film project.

Milestone attempted to make a film about the Russian Revolution (working title: Red Square) based on Stalinist Ilya Ehrenburg's work The Life and Death of Nikolai Kourbov (1923), and an adaptation of H. G. Wells's The Shape of Things to Come proposed by Alexander Korda, but neither project materialized. Instead of these unrealized films, Milestone directed "a string of three insignificant studio pieces" from 1934 to 1936.

Milestone accepted a lucrative deal to direct a film starring John Gilbert and left United Artists for Harry Cohn's Columbia Pictures. The Captain Hates the Sea is a spoof of the 1932 movie Grand Hotel, which stars Greta Garbo, Joan Crawford, and John Barrymore. Milestone's largely improvised film stars an ensemble of Columbia's character actors, among them Victor McLaglen and The Three Stooges. Joseph Millichap described The Captain Hates the Sea as "a very uneven, disconnected, rambling piece". Cost overruns on The Captain Hates the Sea, which were complicated by the cast members' heavy drinking, soured relations between Milestone and Cohen. The movie is notable as the final film of Gilbert's career.

Milestone's next two films for Paramount Paris in Spring and Anything Goes are the only musicals of his career, but are relatively undistinguished in their execution. Milestone described them as "insignificant". Milestone was assigned to Paris in Spring, a romantic musical farce. Leading man Tullio Carminati had just completed the operetta-like One Night of Love with Grace Moore at Columbia Studios. Paramount paired Mary Ellis with Carminati, and it was Milestone's task to direct a film to rival Columbia's success. Aside from a credible replica of Paris created by art directors Hans Dreier and Ernst Fegté, Milestone's directing failed to overcome "the essential flatness of the tale". Anything Goes, a musical starring Bing Crosby and Ethel Merman, and adapted from Cole Porter's 1934 Broadway musical, includes some enduring songs, including "I Get a Kick Out of You", "You're the Top", and the title song. According to Canham, Milestone's directing is conscientious, but he showed little enthusiasm for the genre.

=== The General Died at Dawn (1936) ===
Following his two lackluster musicals, Milestone returned to form in 1936 with The General Died at Dawn, which is reminiscent in theme, setting, and style of director Josef von Sternberg's The Shanghai Express.

The screenplay was written by Leftist playwright Clifford Odets and is derived from an obscure pulp-influenced manuscript by Charles G. Booth. It is set in the Far East, and has a sociopolitical theme: the "tension between democracy and authoritarianism". In the opening few minutes, Milestone establishes the American mercenary O'Hara (Gary Cooper), who has Republican commitments. His adversary is the complex, Chinese warlord General Yang (Akim Tamiroff). Madeleine Carroll is cast as the young missionary Judy Perrie, who is "trapped between divided social forces" and struggles to overcome her diffidence, ultimately joining O'Hara in supporting a peasant revolt against Yang.

Milestone's brings to the adventure-melodrama a "bravura" exposition of his cinematic style and technical skills; an impressive use of tracking, a five-way split screen and a widely noted use of a match dissolve that transitions from a billiard table to a white door handle leading to an adjoining room; it is "one of the most expert match shots on record" according to historian John Baxter.

Though disparaged by Milestone in retrospect, The General Died at Dawn is considered one of the "masterpieces" of 1930s Hollywood cinema. Milestone was served by cinematographer Victor Milner, art directors Hans Dreier and Ernst Fegté, and composer Werner Janssen in, according to Baxter (1970), creating "his most exquisite and exciting if not most meaningful examination of social friction in a human context".

== Directorial hiatus: 1936–1939 ==
After completing The General Died at Dawn, Milestone experienced a series of professional setbacks, including lawsuits, failed projects and broken contracts, that stalled his film career for three years.

During this period, Milestone pursued a number of serious projects, including direction of a film version of Vincent Sheean's memoir Personal History (1935), which Alfred Hitchcock later directed as Foreign Correspondent, went unfulfilled. Another failed project was a screenplay Milestone and Clifford Odets wrote for an adaptation of the Sidney Kingsley Broadway hit Dead End (1935) for Sam Goldwyn that went to William Wyler, a director of literary texts, like Milestone.

To remain employed, Milestone accepted Paramount's offer to direct Pat O'Brien in show-business drama The Night of Nights, a "second line" studio production. According to Millichap (1981), the film's best feature is its sets, which Hans Dreier designed.

After signing a contract with Hal Roach in late 1937 to direct an adaptation of Eric S. Hatch's novel Road Show (1934), the producer dismissed Milestone for straying from the novel's comedic elements. Litigation ensued, and the matter was resolved when Roach presented Milestone with another project: to adapt to film John Steinbeck's novella Of Mice and Men.

=== Of Mice and Men (1939) ===
Milestone had been impressed with Steinbeck's novella Of Mice and Men and its 1938 stage production, a morality play set during the Dust Bowl, and he was enthusiastic about the film project. Producer Hal Roach hoped to emulate the anticipated success of director John Ford's adaptation of another Steinbeck work The Grapes of Wrath. Both films drew upon the political and creative developments that emerged in the Great Depression rather than the approaching 1940s and the impending conflict in Europe. Milestone solicited Steinbeck's support for the film; Steinbeck "essentially approved the script", as did the Hays Office, which made only "minor" changes to the scenario.

According to Millichap (1981), Milestone maintains the "anti-omniscient" detachment Steinbeck applied to his novella with a cinematic viewpoint that matches the author's literary realism. Milestone placed great emphasis on visual and sound motifs that develop the characters and themes. As such, he carefully conferred on image motifs with art director Nicolai Remisoff and cameraman Norbert Brodine, and persuaded composer Aaron Copland to provide the musical score. Critic Kingley Canham noted the importance Milestone placed on his sound motifs:

the [musical] score, one of several scored for Milestone by Aaron Copland, played a decisive role in the form of the film: natural sounds and dialogue sequences were interpolated with the music to act as complementary motifs to the visual and narrative development.

The film was a critical success and garnered Copland Academy Award nominations for Best Musical Score and Best Original Score.

Milestone, who preferred to cast "relative unknowns"—in this case influenced by budgetary restraints—cast Lon Chaney Jr. to play the childlike Lennie Small and Burgess Meredith as his keeper George Milton. Betty Field, in her first important feature, plays Mae, the faithless spouse of straw boss Curly (Bob Steele).

Of Mice and Men was nominated for the Academy Award for Best Picture of 1939, but competing with the year's other major films, including The Wizard of Oz, Stagecoach, Goodbye, Mr. Chips, Mr. Smith Goes to Washington, Wuthering Heights, and the winner, Gone with the Wind.

Despite critical accolades for Of Mice and Men, the tragic narrative that ends in the mercy-killing of the doomed Lennie at the hands of his comrade George was less than gratifying to audiences, and it failed at the box office.

=== Early 1940s ===
Milestone's reputation as a director was undiminished among Hollywood executives after Of Mice and Men, and RKO signed him to direct two light comedies, both of which star Ronald Colman. Milestone was provided with his own production unit, and quickly satisfied his contractual obligations, directing Ginger Rogers in Lucky Partners and Anna Lee in the "totally disarming frolic" My Life with Caroline. According to Milestone:

This particular pair of comedies [Lucky Partner (1940) and My Life with Caroline (1941)] were of the kind you did if you hoped to stay in motion pictures, in the expectation that the next film might give you a chance to redeem yourself.

== World War II Hollywood propaganda: 1942–1945 ==
Milestone's reputation as the director of All Quiet on the Western Front, though an emphatically pacifist and anti-war film, positioned him as an asset in Hollywood's "patriotic and profitable" production of anti-fascist war films. Film curator Charles Silver noted Milestone's "facility for capturing battle's intrinsic spectacle ... there is an inevitable pageantry to cinematic warfare that works against whatever pacifist intentions the filmmaker may have". Milestone said, "how can you make a pacifist film without showing the violence of war?" Responding to the "general climate of opinion in wartime Hollywood", Milestone abandoned any reservations about his commitments to the US war effort and offered his services to the film industry's propaganda units.

=== Our Russian Front (1942) ===
Our Russian Front is a 1942 war documentary assembled from 15,000 ft (4,600 m) of newsreel footage taken on the Russian front by Soviet citizen-journalists during the Nazi invasion of the Soviet Union in 1941. In collaboration with Dutch filmmaker Joris Ivens, working with The Government Film Service in 1940, Milestone depicted the struggle of Russian villagers to resist the German invasion. Actor Walter Huston narrated the documentary and composer Dimitri Tiomkin provided the film score.

=== Edge of Darkness (1943) ===
Seventeen years after directing The Caveman for Warner Brothers, Milestone returned to Warner for a one-film contract. Edge of Darkness is the first of three successful films he made in collaboration with screenwriter Robert Rossen. The film stars Errol Flynn and Ann Sheridan as Norwegian freedom fighters, and Helmut Dantine as a sociopathic Nazi commandant; it signals a change in Milestone's professional and personal attitude toward his war films. Milestone said:

Edge of Darkness has done away with disillusionment. We know the enemy we are fighting and we are facing the stern realities of the present war. The moral of Edge of Darkness is "United we stand, divided we fall." That is the great lesson of our time and the keystone for victory for the democratic cause.

Edge of Darkness, a melodramatic film fantasy, is set in a remote Norwegian village whose inhabitants are brutalized by Nazi occupiers, inspiring resistance among the townspeople, who rebel and eliminate the Nazi occupiers. Milestone employs an "anti-suspense" device that shows the carnage suffered by the inhabitants then reveals the story in flashback. Milestone's "thematic oversimplification" reflected Hollywood's penchant for melodramatic propaganda.

=== The North Star (1943) ===
Milestone's next project was the propaganda film The North Star, which dramatizes the damage caused by the German invasion of the Soviet Union to the inhabitants of a Ukrainian farming collective. US President Franklin D. Roosevelt dispatched Lowell Mellett, chief of the Bureau of Motion Pictures of the Office of War Information to enlist producer Sam Goldwyn to make a film celebrating America's wartime alliance with Russia. Milestone's production staff included playwright-screenwriter Lillian Hellman, cinematographer James Wong Howe, set designer William Cameron Menzies, composer Aaron Copland, lyricist Ira Gershwin and a competent cast.

Hellman's script and Milestone's cinematic compositions establish the bucolic settings and social unity that characterize the collective's inhabitants. Milestone uses a tracking shot to follow the aged comic figure Karp (Walter Brennan) as he rides his cart through the village, a device Milestone used to introduce the film's key characters. An extended sequence portrays the villagers celebrating the harvest with food, song, and dance, resembling an ethnic operetta. Milestone used an overhead camera to record the circular symmetry of the happy revelers. Milestone displays his "technical mastery" as villagers discern the approach of German bombers. Portions of this sequence resemble documentary war footage, recalling Milestone's work in All Quiet on the Western Front and Joris Ivens The Spanish Earth.

The North Star received positive reviews from the mainstream press, and only Hearst-owned papers interpreted the film's pro-Russian themes as pro-Communist propaganda. The Academy of Arts and Sciences nominated The North Star for Academy Awards for Best Art Direction, Best Cinematography, Best Special Effects, Best Musical Score, Best Sound and Best Original Screenplay. The film was largely ignored at the box office.

In the post-war years, Sam Goldwyn's The North Star, Warner Brothers' Mission to Moscow, and M-G-M's Song of Russia came under scrutiny by the anti-communist House Un-American Activities Committee.

In 1957, The North Star was reissued as Armored Attack in a heavily edited form; sequences that celebrate life under the Stalinist regime were removed. The setting is represented as Hungary during its 1956 uprising with a voice-over condemning communism.

=== The Purple Heart (1944) ===
The Purple Heart, which is set in the Pacific War, is about captured American airmen who are prosecuted by Imperial Japan for violating the Geneva Conventions by participating in the July 18, 1942, Doolittle Raid over Japan by B-25 bombers.

The film is based on a real-life incident. Milestone's technical skill in presenting the airmen's ordeal was potent propaganda, but it risked rationalizing the US bombing and anti-Japanese jingoism. The Purple Heart award, which the captured men are ultimately bestowed, is earned through wounds inflicted by torture to extract military secrets and not through combat. According to Millichap (1981), it is a cinematically superior war film; Milestone said of his commitment to supply propaganda for the American war effort: "We didn't hesitate to make this kind of film during the war".

=== Guest in the House (1944) ===
Milestone's next project, the United Artists production Guest in the House, is a psychological thriller in the style of Alfred Hitchcock. Milestone was removed from the project when he underwent an emergency appendectomy during filming. Milestone contributed some scenes, but John Brahm was credited with directing the film, which prepared Anne Baxter for her starring role in Joseph L. Mankiewicz's 1950 feature All About Eve.

=== A Walk in the Sun (1945) ===
Milestone's second collaboration with screenwriter Robert Rossen, A Walk in the Sun, is based on Harry Joe Brown's 1944 eponymous novel. Milestone invested $30,000 of his own savings, a measure of his enthusiasm for the novel and its cinematic potential. A Walk in the Sun takes place during the 1943 Allied invasion of Italy; a platoon of American soldiers is tasked with advancing inland six miles (9.7 km) from Salerno to take a German-held bridge and farmhouse. Milestone's perspective on war, as depicted in A Walk in the Sun, differs from that of All Quiet on the Western Front, a moving indictment of war. According to biographer Joseph Millichap:

All Quiet on the Western Front, both the novel and the film, used the microcosm of one platoon to make a major thematic statement about the macrocosm of war. A Walk in the Sun's thematic statement is muted by the demands of propaganda and the studio system in the film.

According to Millichap (1981), despite these limitations, Milestone avoided the "set hero and mock heroics" typical of Hollywood war movies, allowing for a measure of genuine realism reminiscent of his 1930 masterwork [All Quiet on the Western Front]. Milestone's trademark handling of tracking shots is evident in the action scenes.

== Red Scare and the Hollywood blacklist ==
At the onset of the Cold War, Hollywood studios, in alliance with the US Congress, sought to expose communist-inspired content in American films. Milestone's pro-Soviet Union film The North Star (1943), which was made at the behest of the US government to encourage American support for its wartime alliance with the USSR against the Axis powers, became a target. Other pro-Soviet Union wartime films, such as Michael Curtiz's Mission to Moscow, Gregory Ratoff's Song of Russia, and Jacques Tourneur's Days of Glory (1944), were "to haunt their creators in the McCarthy era" when any hint of sympathy for the Soviet Union was considered subversive to American ideals.

Milestone's alignment with liberal causes such as the Committee for the First Amendment compounded suspicions that he harbored pro-communist sentiments during the Red Scare. The House Un-American Activities Committee (HUAC) summoned Milestone and other filmmakers for questioning. According to Joseph Millichap:

The Russian-born Milestone, always a liberal intellectual with Leftist inclinations, was a natural target for the witch hunters of the HUAC. As early as November of 1946, Milestone appeared before the committee as an 'unfriendly witness'; in other words, he claimed his constitutional right not to testify. In 1948, the anti-communist writer Myron Fagan implied that Milestone was a Red sympathizer, [a claim made explicit] by Hedda Hopper in her nationally syndicated Hollywood column. Unlike the Hollywood Ten and many others, Milestone was able to keep working.

The effect of the Hollywood blacklist on Milestone's creative output is unclear. Unlike many of his colleagues, he continued to find work, but, according to film critic Michael Barson, the quantity and quality of his work may have been limited through industry "greylisting". Millichap said, "Milestone refused to comment on this side of his life: evidently, he found it very painful".

== Post-war films: 1946–1951 ==
=== The Strange Love of Martha Ivers (1946) ===
The movies Milestone directed in the late 1940s represent "the last distinctive period" in his creative output. His first post-war project was the Hal B. Wallis production The Strange Love of Martha Ivers (1946), which is based on the story "Love Lies Bleeding" by John Patrick. The film, which was made in collaboration with screenwriter Robert Rossen, is, according to Higham and Greenberg (1968), a "striking addition" to the post-war Hollywood film genre film noir, combining a grim, 19th-century romanticism with the cinematic methods of German Expressionism.

Rossen's and Milestone's script provided the cast, which features Barbara Stanwyck, Van Heflin, and Kirk Douglas in his first screen appearance, with a "taut, harsh" narrative that critiques post-war, urban America as corrupt and irredeemable. Cinematographer Victor Milner supplied the film noir effects, and musical director Miklós Rózsa integrated sound motifs with Milestone's visual elements.

=== Arch of Triumph (1948) ===
Following The Strange Love of Martha Ivers, Milestone left Paramount and moved to the independent Enterprise Productions. His first film for Enterprise was Arch of Triumph, which is based on Erich Maria Remarque's 1945 eponymous novel.

Arch of Triumph was highly anticipated by moviegoers and by Enterprise Productions, which committed huge capital investments to the project. The novel is set in Paris in 1939; Remarque's autobiographical work examines the personal devastation of two displaced persons: surgeon Dr. Ravic (Charles Boyer), who is fleeing Nazis persecution, and the demimonde courtesan Joan Modau (Ingrid Bergman); the pair fall in love and suffer a tragic fate.

Remarque's depictions of the Paris underworld, which describe a revenge murder and a mercy killing, were at odds with the strictures of the Production Code Administration. Milestone excised "the bars, brothels, and operating rooms", and the sordid ending from the screenplay. Enterprise Productions executives, who wanted a film that would rival Metro-Goldwyn-Mayer's recently re-released Gone with the Wind (1939), had procured Charles Boyer and Ingrid Bergman. The miscasting of screen stars Boyer and Bergman as Dr. Ravic and Joan Madou, respectively, impaired Milestone's development of these characters with respect to the literary source. Milestone said:

One thing wrong was that it was supposed to be a realistic piece, but it had two major stars in the lead. If you have two major stars like that, then half your reality goes out the window.

Milestone delivered a four-hour version of Arch of Triumph that Enterprise Productions had approved. Executives reversed that decision shortly before its release, cutting the movie to the more usual two hours. Entire scenes and characters were removed, undermining the clarity and continuity of Milestone's work. Milestone's overall disaffection for the project is evident in his indifferent application of cinematic technique, contributing to the failure of his film adaptation. According to Millichap (1981):

Milestone cannot be completely absolved of responsibility for the disaster ... Even given the fragmentary state of the final print, the film seems strangely inert and lifeless. Mainly studio shot, the careful mise-en-scène of earlier films is missing. Aside from two or three sequences, the compositions are dull, the camera is static, the editing predictable ... Milestone seems to have almost given up

Millichap added: "Wherever the blame is placed, Arch of Triumph is a clear failure, a bad film made from a good book".

Arch of Triumph was a failure at the box office, and Enterprise Productions took a significant loss. Milestone continued working with the studio, accepting an offer to produce and direct a Dana Andrews and Lilli Palmer comedy, No Minor Vices. No Minor Vices, a "semi-sophisticated" film that is reminiscent of Milestone's 1941 comedy My Life with Caroline, added little to Milestone's oeuvre. After this film, Milestone departed Enterprise.

=== The Red Pony (1949) ===
Milestone's next project, in collaboration with novelist John Steinbeck at Republic Pictures, was to direct a film version of The Red Pony (1937), a short story cycle set in California's rural Salinas Valley in the early 20th century. Milestone and Steinbeck had considered adapting these coming-of-age stories about a boy and his pony since 1940. In 1946, they partnered with Republic Pictures, an amalgamation of "Poverty Row" studios known for low-budget westerns but now prepared to invest in a major production.

Steinbeck served as the sole screenwriter on The Red Pony. His novella, composed of four short stories, is "unified only by continuities of character, setting, and theme". Identifying a market for the film was a key concern for Republic, which insisted on a movie aimed at young audiences. In the interests of crafting a sequential, coherent narrative, Steinbeck mostly limited the film adaptation to the stories "The Gift" and "The Leader of the People", omitting some of the novella's harsher episodes. Steinbeck willingly provided a more upbeat ending to the film, an accommodation that, according to Millichap (1981), "completely distorts ... the thematic thrust of Steinbeck's story sequence."

Casting for The Red Pony presented Milestone difficulties developing Steinbeck's characters and themes, which explore a child's "initiation into the realities of adult life". The aging ranch hand Billy Buck is portrayed by the youthful and virile Robert Mitchum, whose character effectively displaces the father Fred Tiflin (Shepperd Strudwick) as male mentor to the nine-year-old Tom Tiflin (Peter Miles). The boy's mother is played by Myrna Loy. According to Millichap, "The major casting problem is the [young] protagonist. Perhaps no child star could capture the complexity of this role, as it is much easier for an adult to write about sensitive children than for a child to play one."

According to Millichap (1981), Milestone's cinematic effort fails to do justice to the literary source, but several of the visual and aural elements are impressive. The opening sequence resembles the prologue of his 1939 adaptation of Steinbeck's novel Of Mice and Men, introducing the natural world that will dominate and inform the characters' lives.

The Red Pony is Milestone's first Technicolor film; according to Canham (1974), his "graceful visual touch" is enhanced by cameraman Tony Gaudio's painterly renderings of the rural landscape. According to Barson (2020), composer Aaron Copland's highly regarded film score perhaps surpasses Milestone's visual rendering of Steinbeck's story.

The Red Pony provided Enterprise with a satisfactory "prestige" property, generating critical praise and respectable box office returns.

=== Move to 20th Century Fox ===
Milestone moved to 20th Century Fox, where he made three films: Halls of Montezuma, Kangaroo, and Les Misérables.

Halls of Montezuma, released in January 1951, reflects the Cold War imperatives that informed Hollywood films during the Korean War. The story, which Michael Blankfort wrote with Milestone as uncredited co-screenwriter, concerns an attack by US Marines on a Japanese-held island during World War II, and focuses on the heroic suffering experienced by one patrol in its effort to locate a Japanese rocket-launching bunker. Milestone's dual themes celebrate both Marine combat heroics, juxtaposed with an examination of psychological damage to the soldiers who participate in the "horrors" of modern warfare, including the torture of enemy combatants. Milestone denied Halls of Montezuma addressed his "personal beliefs" on the nature of war; he agreed to direct the movie as a financial expedient.

Halls of Montezuma recalls some elements of Milestone's 1930 anti-war classic All Quiet on the Western Front. The film's cast, like the earlier film, was selected from relatively unknown actors, their "complex and believable" characterizations revealing the contrasts between hardened veterans and green recruits. The cinematic handling of battle scenes is also reminiscent of the 1930 movie, where Marines deploy from their landing crafts and advance on open terrain under enemy fire. Milestone reverts to the formulaic war movie with a standard "Give 'em Hell" climax, accompanied by the strains of the Marine Hymn. The film is commonly cited as representing the onset of a purported decline in his talents or his exploitation by the studios.

After completing Halls of Montezuma, 20th Century Fox, the studio sent Milestone to Australia to use funds limited to reinvestment in that country. Based on this consideration, Milestone filmed Kangaroo, which film critic Bosley Crowther termed an "antipodal Western". According to film critic Joseph Millichap (1981), Milestone struggled with the studio over "the utterly ridiculous script, a collection of Western clichés transposed from the American plains to the Australian outback". Milestone attempted to evade the poor literary vehicle by concentrating on "the landscape, flora, and fauna" of the Australian outback at the expense of dialogue. The Technicolor cinematography by Charles G. Clarke achieved a documentary-like quality, incorporating Milestone's hallmark panning and tracking methods. It has been argued that Milestone's changes to the script hurt the film.

For the last of his three pictures at 20th Century Fox, Milestone delivered Les Misérables, a 104-minute version of Victor Hugo's eponymous romance novel. Fox producers provided the project with their contracted actors, including Michael Rennie, Debra Paget, Robert Newton, and Sylvia Sidney, and lavish production support. According to Canham (1974), the script by Richard Murphy "telescopes all the novel's famous set-pieces into this cliché-ridden" abbreviated adaptation. In a 1968 interview with film historians Charles Higham and Joel Greenberg, Milestone said of his approach during the filming of Les Misérables, "Oh, for Chrissake, it was just a job; I'll do it and get it over with". According to Millichap (1981), "that he did little with [Hugo's] literary classic ... seems to indicate the waning of Milestone's creative energies".

== Late career, 1952–1962 ==
Milestone's final years as a filmmaker correspond to the decline of the Hollywood movie empire; his final eight films reflect these historic developments. By 1962, shortly before the release of his last Hollywood film, Mutiny on the Bounty, Films and Filming (December 1962) wrote: "In common with so many of the Old Guard directors, Lewis Milestone's reputation has somewhat tarnished over the last decade. His films no longer have that stamp of individuality which distinguished his early work."

During the last stage of his career, Milestone's films are, according to Joseph Millichap (1981), "less a reprise of the director's earlier achievements than several desperate efforts to keep working. Even more markedly than in his earlier career, Milestone moved frenetically between pictures which varied widely in setting, style and accomplishment."

=== Sojourn in Europe, 1953–1954 ===
In the early 1950s, Milestone traveled to England and Italy seeking work. He directed a biography of a diva, a World War II action drama, and an international romance-melodrama.

Melba, which was filmed at Horizon Pictures, is a biopic of Australian coloratura soprano singer Dame Nellie Melba. The film was an effort by producer Sam Spiegel to capitalize on the popularity of contemporaneous film biographies of Enrico Caruso and Gilbert and Sullivan. Metropolitan Opera star Patrice Munsel made her screen debut playing Melba. Aside from Munsel's performance, Milestone was forced to work with a "worthless script" and an "insipid cast" and failed to deliver a compelling rendering of Melba's life. According to Kingsley Canham, Melba "turned out to be a disastrous flop" at the box office. Milestone remained in England during 1953 to film They Who Dare, a wartime adventure, for Mayflower Productions–British Lion Films, starring Dirk Bogarde. The film is a dramatization of an account of a British and Greek commando unit assigned to destroy a German airfield on Rhodes. The film is based on a script by Robert Westerby; Milestone delivered an action-packed climax in the final minutes of the film that recalls his early work in this genre, but the film had a poor reception from critics and audiences. According to Canham (1974), Milestone's consecutive box-office failures "was not a good omen for an established director, especially in the Fifties".

Milestone's next movie, The Widow (La Vedova) was filmed in Italy for Ventruini/Express in 1954, and adapted by Milestone from a novel by Susan York. The film is a "soap opera-ish love triangle", and stars Patricia Roc, Massimo Serato, and Anna Maria Ferrero. According to Canham (1974), "The triangle and its consequences are predictable, and Milestone's part in the proceedings seems simply to record the inevitable tragedy on film".

=== Pork Chop Hill (1959) ===
According to Millichap (1981), Pork Chop Hill, which was produced by Sy Bartlett for the Melville Company, represents the third work in "an informal war trilogy", along with All Quiet on the Western Front and A Walk in the Sun. The film is based on a recounting of a Korean War battle by combat veteran S. L. A. Marshall and a screenplay by James R. Webb. According to Millichap (1981), Milestone was provided with a realistic literary platform from which to develop his final cinematic treatment of men at war.

The film's plot involves a strategically pointless assault by a company of U.S. infantrymen to secure and defend a nondescript hill against a much larger Chinese battalion. According to Canham (1974), the plot involves "The story of a battle for a strategic point of little military value, but of great moral value, during the last days of the Korean War".

Milestone, and actor and financial investor in the project, Gregory Peck, who plays company commander Lieutenant Joe Clemons, argued over the presentation of the film's themes. Rather than emphasizing the pointlessness of the military operation, Peck favored a more politicized message, equating the taking of Pork Chop Hill with the battles of Bunker Hill and Gettysburg. According to McGee (2003), the studio's final edit of the director's cut blunted Milestone's message concerning the futility of war, perhaps his most anti-war statement since All Quiet on the Western Front. According to Millichap (1981):

It was Peck's conception of the part which doomed Milestone's vision; Peck converted the role into a more or less standard Superman of World War II vintage ... and also cut much of Milestone's careful development of other characters, his artistic counterpointing of the opposing forces, and his bitterly ironic conclusion.

Milestone distanced himself from the final cut of the film, saying, "Pork Chop Hill became a film I am not proud of ... [merely] one more war movie". In addition to Peck, Milestone cast primarily unknown actors as the officers and the rank-and-file characters, among them Woody Strode, Harry Guardino, Robert Blake in his first adult role, George Peppard, Norman Fell, Abel Fernandez, Gavin MacLeod, Harry Dean Stanton, and Clarence Williams III.

=== Ocean's 11 (1960) ===
Milestone accepted an offer from Warner Bros. to produce and direct the comedy-heist film Ocean's 11 for Dorchester Studios. The story by George Clayton Johnson concerns a group of ex-military comrades who orchestrate an elaborate burglary of Las Vegas's biggest casinos. The movie stars the Rat Pack led by Frank Sinatra, who, like the director, had been a supporter of the Committee for the First Amendment during the Red Scare. Milestone's earlier success with comedy films and combat sagas may have influenced Warner's decision to choose Milestone for the film.

The film's screenplay, which Millichap (1981) called "preposterous", was written by Harry Brown and Charles Lederer. Millichap (1981) said Milestone delivered a film that equivocates between a pure satire of American acquisitiveness and its celebration. The film was a box-office success, but critics have widely dismissed it as unworthy of Milestone's talents. According to film critic David Walsh:

[H]owever history had contrived to drop the somewhat improbable project in his lap, Milestone no doubt worked away conscientiously on Ocean's 11. He probably had little choice in the matter. Even in the last days of the studio system, directors were more or less at the beck and call of the studio chiefs. The more talented, working within an institutional straitjacket, struggled to imbue their genre projects with personal and social meaning, with varying degrees of success.

=== Mutiny on the Bounty (1962) ===
Metro-Goldwyn-Mayer's remake of Frank Lloyd's 1935 film Mutiny on the Bounty, starring Clark Gable and Charles Laughton, was consistent with Hollywood's resort to blockbuster productions during the late Fifties. The studio risked over $20 million on the "ill-starred" 1962 Mutiny on the Bounty and recovered less than half of it.

In February 1961, the 65-year-old Milestone took over directorial duties from Carol Reed, who became disillusioned with the project due to inadequate scripting, inclement weather on location in Tahiti, and disputes with leading man Marlon Brando. Milestone was tasked with bringing good order and discipline to the production and with curbing Brando. Rather than inheriting a largely completed film, Milestone discovered only a few scenes had been filmed.

According to Miller (2010), the production history of the 1962 Mutiny on the Bounty is a record of personal and professional recriminations registered by Milestone and Brando rather than a coherent cinematic endeavor. To assert creative control over his character mutineer Fletcher Christian, Brando collaborated with screenwriters and off-set, independently of Milestone, leading Milestone to withdraw from some scenes and sequences, and effectively relinquish control to Brando. Millichap refers to the film as "the Brando-Milestone" Mutiny on the Bounty, noting "The story of this Hollywood disaster is long and complex, but the central figure in every sense is Marlon Brando, not Lewis Milestone".

Mutiny on the Bounty is the final completed film for which Milestone was credited, but according to Canham (1974), it is not considered representative of Milestone's oeuvre.

== Television and unrealized film projects: 1955–1965 ==
After completing The Widow (La Vedova), Milestone returned to the United States in search of film projects. With the Hollywood studio system in decline, Milestone resorted to television to keep working. Five years elapsed before he completed another feature film. In 1956–1957, Milestone partnered with actor-producer Kirk Douglas, who had debuted in Milestone's The Strange Love of Martha Ivers, to make a movie about a Citizen Kane-like tycoon, but the project, which was titled King Kelly, was abandoned after a year.

In 1957, Milestone directed episodes of television drama series, including Alfred Hitchcock Presents (two episodes), Schlitz Playhouse (two episodes), and Suspicion (one episode). In 1958, Milestone directed actor Richard Boone, who debuted in Milestone's Kangaroo (1952), in two episodes of the television western Have Gun – Will Travel. Milestone embarked upon the filming of Warner Bros' PT 109, a biography of John F. Kennedy's experiences as a torpedo boat commander in the Pacific War. After several weeks of filming, Jack L. Warner removed Milestone from the project and replaced him with director Leslie H. Martinson, who received the screen credit.

Milestone found television productions unappealing but returned to that medium after completing Mutiny on the Bounty, directing one episode of the series Arrest and Trial and one episode of The Richard Boone Show, both in 1963. Milestone's final film work was for a multinational joint venture with American International Pictures' La Guea Seno- The Dirty Game, for which he directed one episode before being replaced by Terence Young due to failing health.

Several of Milestone's films—Seven Sinners, The Front Page, The Racket, and Two Arabian Knights—were preserved by the Academy Film Archive in 2016 and 2017.

== Personal life and death ==
In 1935, Milestone and actress Kendall Lee, whose full name was Kendall Lee Glaezner, were married. Lee and Milestone had met on the set of his 1932 film Rain, in which Lee had played Mrs. MacPhail. They had no children and remained married until Lee died in 1978. According to biographer Joseph Millichap, "over the years the Milestones were the most gracious of Hollywood hosts, giving parties that attracted the cream of the film community".

Milestone experienced declining health in the 1960s and suffered a stroke in 1978, shortly after the death of Kendall Lee, his wife of 43 years.

After further illnesses, Milestone died on September 25, 1980, at UCLA Medical Center, five days before his 85th birthday. Milestone's final request before he died was for Universal Studios to restore All Quiet on the Western Front to its original length. The Library of Congress's Motion Picture Division released a fully restored version of the film in 1998. Milestone is interred in the Westwood Village Memorial Park Cemetery in Los Angeles.

== Recognition and accolades ==
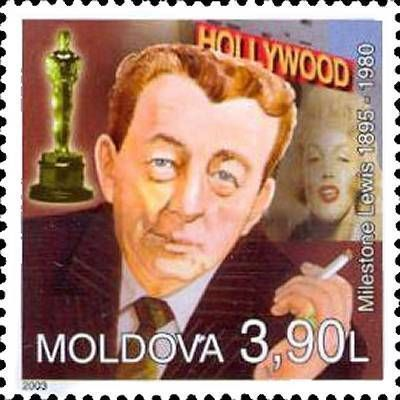
2003 stamp

Lewis Milestone's oeuvre spans thirty-seven years (1925–1962) and consists of 38 feature films. As such, according to Millichap (1981), he was one of the major contributors to screen art and entertainment during the Hollywood Golden Age. Like most of his contemporary American filmmakers, Milestone's work includes the silent and sound eras, which is evident in his style, which blends the visual elements of Expressionism with the Realism that evolved with naturalistic sound. According to Sarris in American Cinema (1968) quoted in Walsh (2001), Milestone was "a formalist of the Left" who was "hailed as the American [Sergei] Eisenstein after All Quiet on the Western Front (1930) and The Front Page (1931)".

At the outset of talking pictures, the 29-year-old Milestone used his skill for an adaptation of Erich Maria Remarque's anti-war novel All Quiet on the Western Front, which is regarded as Milestone's magnum opus and the peak of his career; according to Baxter (1970), Milestone's subsequent work never achieved the same artistic or critical success. Biographer Kingsley Canham wrote: "The problem of making a classic film early in a career is that it sets a standard of comparison for all future work that is, in some instances, unfair". Milestone's films occasionally exhibit the technical inventiveness and bravura of All Quiet on the Western Front but lack Milestone's commitment to a literary source or screenplay that informed that film.

According to Millichap (1981), Milestone's subsequent work in Hollywood includes outstanding and mediocre films that are characterized by their eclecticism but often lack any clear artistic purpose. The most predictable feature may have been an application of his technical talents. Film critic Andrew Sarris said, "Milestone's fluid camera style has always been dissociated from any personal viewpoint. He is almost the classic example of the uncommitted director ... his professionalism is as unyielding as it is meaningless." Kingsley Canham said, "time and again Milestone's career has been written off because of his lack of commitment or to involvement in his work". Millichap links Milestone's "profuse, eclectic, and uneven body of work" to the imperatives of the Hollywood film industry, saying:

Milestone's creativity was rooted in the studio system. Both his best and worst movies resulted from his pragmatic commitment to the cinematic transformation of literary properties presented by the production system ... both his strong points and his limitations were generated by that Hollywood system. When he applied his cinematic style to "strong literary matter," memorable films resulted; but when he was assigned weak, trivial material, the results were usually mediocre.

Film critic and biographer Richard Koszarski considers Milestone "one of the [1930s] more independent spirits ... but like many of the pioneer directors ... his relation to the studio system at the height of its [executive] powers was not a productive one". Koszarski offers a metaphor Milestone had applied to his own final works: "the latter part of [Milestone]'s career was marked by only sporadic flashes of creativity, a veritable forest of saplings graced by only one or two solitary oaks".

=== Academy Awards ===
Year	Award	Film	Result
1927–28	Academy Award for Best Director (Comedy)	Two Arabian Knights	Won
1929–30	Academy Award for Best Director	All Quiet on the Western Front	Won
1930–31	Academy Award for Best Director	The Front Page	Nominated
1939	Academy Award for Best Picture	Of Mice and Men	Nominated

== Filmography ==
- 1918 – The Toothbrush (director)
- 1918 – Posture (director)
- 1918 – Positive (director)
- 1919 – Fit to Win (director)
- 1922 – Up and at 'Em (screenwriter)
- 1923 – Where the North Begins (editor)
- 1924 – The Yankee Consul (screenwriter)
- 1924 – Listen Lester (screenwriter)
- 1925 – The Mad Whirl (screenwriter)
- 1925 – Dangerous Innocence (screenwriter)
- 1925 – The Teaser (screenwriter)
- 1925 – Bobbed Hair (screenwriter)
- 1925 – Seven Sinners (director and screenwriter)
- 1926 – The Caveman (director)
- 1926 – The New Klondike (director)
- 1926 – Fine Manners (director, uncredited)
- 1927 – The Kid Brother (director, uncredited)
- 1927 – Two Arabian Knights (director)
- 1928 – The Garden of Eden (director, producer)
- 1928 – Tempest (director and screenwriter, uncredited)
- 1928 – The Racket (director)
- 1929 – New York Nights (director)
- 1929 – Betrayal (director, producer)
- 1930 – All Quiet on the Western Front (director)
- 1931 – The Front Page (director, producer)
- 1932 – Rain (director, producer)
- 1933 – Hallelujah, I'm a Bum (director)
- 1934 – The Captain Hates the Sea (director, producer)
- 1935 – Paris in Spring (director)
- 1936 – Anything Goes (director)
- 1936 – The General Died at Dawn (director)
- 1939 – Of Mice and Men (director, producer)
- 1939 – The Night of Nights (director)
- 1940 – Lucky Partners (director and screenwriter)
- 1941 – My Life with Caroline (director, producer)
- 1942 – Our Russian Front (director, producer)
- 1943 – Edge of Darkness (director)
- 1943 – The North Star (director)
- 1944 – Guest in the House (director, uncredited)
- 1944 – The Purple Heart (director)
- 1945 – A Walk in the Sun (director, producer)
- 1946 – The Strange Love of Martha Ivers (director)
- 1948 – Arch of Triumph (director and screenwriter)
- 1948 – No Minor Vices (director, producer)
- 1949 – The Red Pony (director, producer)
- 1951 – Halls of Montezuma (director)
- 1952 – Les Misérables (director)
- 1952 – Kangaroo (director)
- 1953 – Melba (director)
- 1954 – They Who Dare (director)
- 1955 – La Vedova X (director and screenwriter)
- 1957 – Alfred Hitchcock Presents (TV series) (director)
- 1957 – Schlitz Playhouse (TV series) (director)
- 1957 – Suspicion (TV series) (director)
- 1958 – Have Gun – Will Travel (TV series) (director)
- 1959 – Pork Chop Hill (director)
- 1960 – Ocean's 11 (director, producer)
- 1962 – Mutiny on the Bounty (director)
- 1963 – The Richard Boone Show (TV series) (director)
- 1963 – Arrest and Trial (TV series) (director)

== See also ==
- List of oldest and youngest Academy Award winners and nominees – Youngest winners for Best Director
- List of Russian Academy Award winners and nominees
- List of Russian Americans
