= The New Klondike =

1926 film by Lewis Milestone

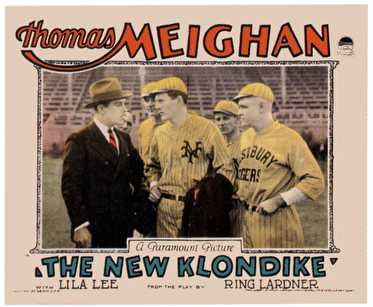
- Lobby card
- Directed by: Lewis Milestone
- Written by: Thomas J. Geraghty; J. Clarkson Miller; Ben Hecht
- Story by: Ring Lardner
- Produced by: Adolph Zukor; Jesse L. Lasky
- Starring: Thomas Meighan; Lila Lee; Paul Kelly; Tefft Johnson
- Cinematography: Alvin Wyckoff
- Production company: Famous Players–Lasky
- Distributed by: Paramount Pictures
- Release date: March 15, 1926 (USA Theatrical)
- Running time: 80 minutes 8 reels
- Country: United States
- Language: Silent (English intertitles)

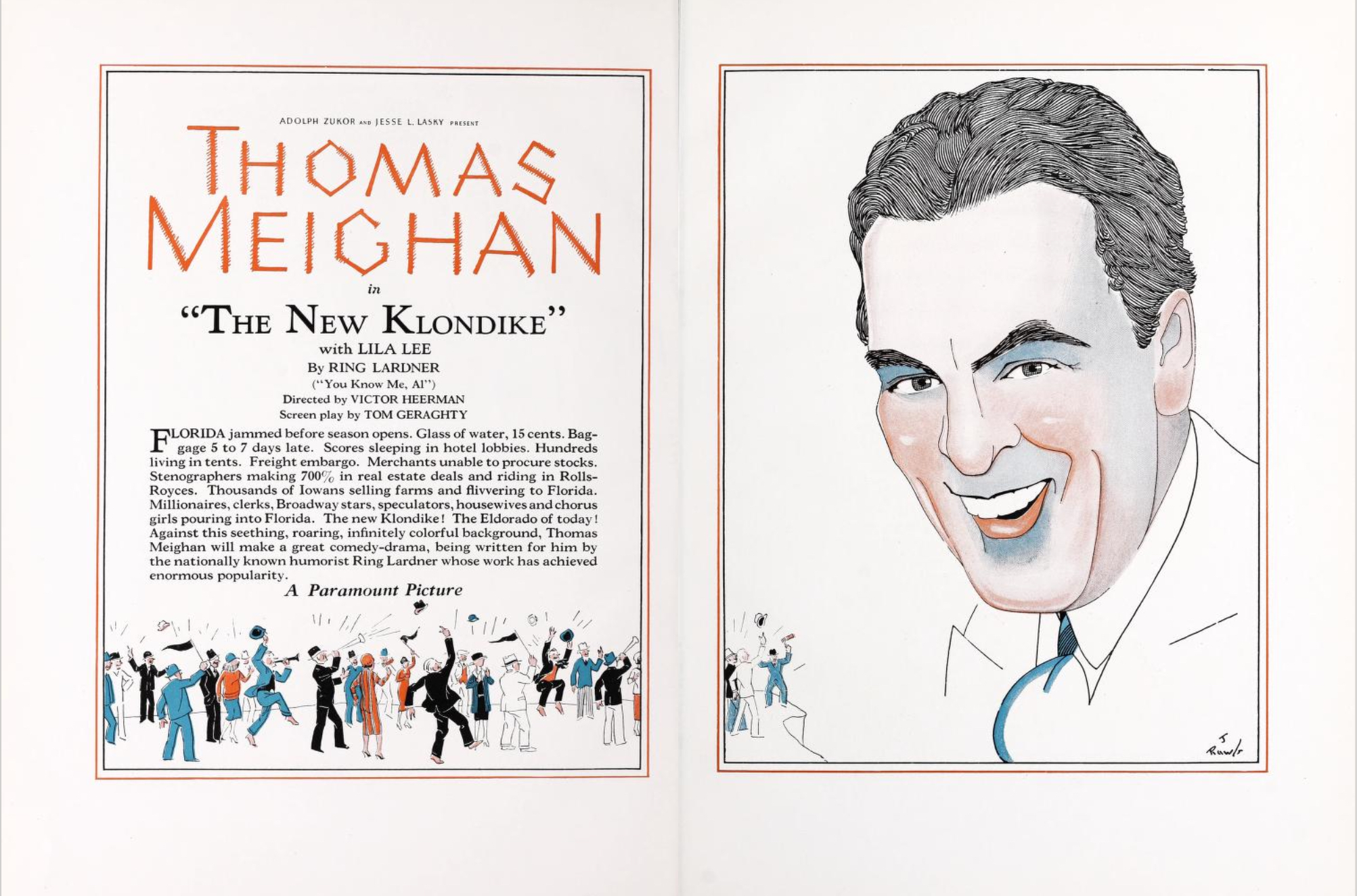
1925 advertisement

The New Klondike is a 1926 American black-and-white silent romantic comedy sports drama film directed by Lewis Milestone for Famous Players–Lasky. The film was set against the backdrop of the Florida land boom of the 1920s, and stands as Ben Hecht's first film assignment.

== Plot ==
Small-town pitcher Thomas Kelly is sent to Spring training with his baseball team in Florida, but is fired by the team's jealous manager, Joe Cooley. Kelly is then talked into being the celebrity endorser for a Florida real estate firm, and his former teammates invest money in the firm through him. Still jealous of Kelly's popularity, Cooley conspires with crooked broker Morgan West to sell Kelly and the investors some worthless swampland. Kelly and his friends lose their money, but Kelly struggles to recoup the losses. He eventually makes a fortune, repays the investors, and is himself appointed team manager in place of Cooley.

== Cast ==
- Thomas Meighan as Tom Kelly
- Lila Lee as Evelyn Lane
- Paul Kelly as Bing Allen
- Tefft Johnson as Col. Dwyer
- Hallie Manning as Flamingo Applegate
- Robert W. Craig as Morgan West
- George De Carlton as Owen
- Jack W. Johnston as Joe Cooley
- Brenda Lane as Bird Dog
- Danny Hayes as The Spieler

== Production ==
Partly filmed on location in Miami, the film is based upon a short story by Ring Lardner and was inspired by both the national baseball craze and the Florida land boom speculation of 1925. The film itself inspired the 1926 Peggy Griffith novel The New Klondike – A Story of a Southern Baseball Training Camp. The film proved successful enough to secure Thomas Meighan a long-term acting contract with Paramount.

== Reception ==
The New York Times wrote, "The wild scramble for Florida real estate is served up in a fairly humorous light in Thomas Meighan's latest production, 'The New Klondike,' which is Thomas J. Geraghty's adaptation of a special story by Ring Lardner." The reviewer noted that the film was predictable and not overburdened with suspense, but that it did provide "several amusing incidents concerned with the activities of the realtors and their victims."

The Brooklyn Eagle review stated: “’The New Klondike’ may be the world to Tommy Meighan and Ring Lardner, who wrote the story and from whom I have come to expect better and funnier things, but to me it can muster not the slightest ripple of excitement....If there were a single player in ‘The New Klondike’ who deserved by his own effort to survive this bellicose account, it would be Paul Kelly, who plays ‘Bing’ Allen. It is Kelly, by a superb characterization of a bush-league ball player, who ‘steals’ the picture.”

== Preservation ==
A print of The New Klondike is held in the Library of Congress film archive. It is a 35mm copy.

== See also ==
- List of baseball films
