= Trog (disambiguation) =

Trog is a 1970 film.

Trog may also refer to:

- Shortened form of "troglodyte", see Cave dweller
- A type of frog-like enemy in the game Drakan: The Ancients' Gates
- A race of fictional cave-dwellers in the Edge Chronicles
- A deity in the video game Linley's Dungeon Crawl
- Trog (video game)
- Wally Fawkes (1924–2023), jazz clarinettist and cartoonist who wrote under the name, "Trog"

== See also ==
- The Troggs, a British band originally called The Troglodytes
- Troglodyte (disambiguation)
