= Caveman (skateboarding) =

Skateboarding trick

Caveman is a skateboarding trick done by jumping onto one's board into (usually) a grind or board slide.

Caveman is also used as a verb to describe attempting a trick from midway, usually by setting the board in position with one's hands, then jumping on the board. For instance, a board slide or grind move may be done by placing the skateboard on the obstacle, then jumping onto the board, rather than riding the board to the obstacle and mounting it. In this latter sense, trying a trick caveman is often helpful for skateboarders to learn new techniques or methods, and often reduces the risk of injury.

A man doing the "Caveman"
