= The Caveman (1926 film) =

1926 film

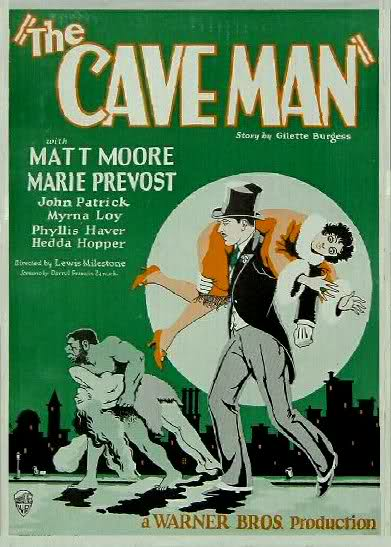
- Theatrical release poster
- Directed by: Lewis Milestone
- Written by: Darryl F. Zanuck (scenario)
- Based on: The Cave Man by Gelett Burgess
- Starring: Matt Moore; Marie Prevost; Phyllis Haver; Hedda Hopper
- Cinematography: David Abel; Frank Kesson
- Production company: Warner Bros.
- Distributed by: Warner Bros.
- Release date: February 6, 1926
- Running time: 7 reels
- Country: United States
- Language: Silent (English intertitles)

The Caveman, also styled as The Cave Man, is a 1926 American silent comedy film produced and distributed by Warner Bros. Lewis Milestone directed the Darryl Zanuck scripted story taken from the play The Cave Man by Gelett Burgess. Matt Moore, Marie Prevost, and Hedda Hopper star. A small role is played by a young Myrna Loy, who was just starting out in her long career.

Vitagraph, a predecessor of Warner Bros., produced a version of this story in 1915 with Robert Edeson.

== Plot ==
As described in a film magazine review, Myra Gaylord, an orphan with two million dollars, is seeking adventure one day and throws one half of a $100 bill out of a window, offering the other half if a person finding it comes to her apartment. Coal heaver Mike Smagg finds that half of the bill with a note attached promising the other half and giving the address of the apartment. When he arrives with one half, Myra decides to groom him and introduce him into society. His caveman methods attract the women. He balks at obeying Myra, who tells him that society will ostracize him if his background and identity become known. He doubts this, but discovers that it is true, and is forced to forego his top hat and suit and don the heavy clothes of a coal heaver. Eventually, after going back to his old haunts, he returns, kidnaps Myra, and rushes her away on a coal wagon to be married.

== Cast ==
- Matt Moore as Mike Smagg
- Marie Prevost as Myra Gaylord
- John Patrick as Brewster Bradford
- Myrna Loy as Maid
- Phyllis Haver as Dolly Van Dream
- Hedda Hopper as Mrs. Van Dream
- Virginia Fox as Party girl (uncredited)

== Preservation ==
The Caveman survives in the Library of Congress. Although it was thought to have a reel missing, on examination it turned out to be complete. It was presented at the 2026 San Francisco Silent Film Festival with a new compiled score by the Mont Alto Motion Picture Orchestra.
