= Susan York =

American artist and educator (born 1951)

- Born: 1951 (age 74–75); Newport, Rhode Island
- Occupation: Artist
- Years active: 1980s-present
- Awards: 2024 John Simon Guggenheim Memorial Foundation Fellowship and 2019 Adolph and Esther Gottlieb Foundation Individual Support Grant
- Website: susanyork.com

Susan York (born 1951) is an American artist and educator known for her reductive cast graphite sculpture. She lives and works in Santa Fe, New Mexico where the quality of light and expansive emptiness of the high desert landscape provides inspiration.

== Early life and education ==
York was born in Newport, Rhode Island.

In 1972, she received a BFA in studio arts from the University of New Mexico in Albuquerque. In 1995, she received an MFA in ceramics from Cranbrook Academy of Art. While in college, York created a body of floor-oriented assemblage work. These flat reductive works marked transitions between 2D and 3D materials.

== Career ==
After graduating from UNM, York continued her art practice in Santa Fe, where she had a studio space at a local Zen Center. In 1982, York attended an Agnes Martin lecture, where she recalls the impact of Martin's statement: "My paintings are not about what is seen. They are about what is known forever in the mind." This was a pivotal experience and later a mentoring friendship evolved between York and Martin.

In 1997, as an artist in residence at the European Ceramic Work Center, in the Netherlands, York began to experiment with integrating her forms within the rooms of a given space. This led to compositions of stacked fragile porcelain shards positioned next to objects blackened with graphite powder rubbed surfaces. York's sculptures are associated with principles of Minimalism with traces of a repetitive hands-on process. Susan York exhibits her work in New York and Europe.

York is the recipient of the Joan Mitchell Foundation Fellowship (2007) and the John Simon Guggenheim Memorial Foundation Fellowship for Fine Arts (2024).The Adolph and Esther Gottlieb Foundation recognized York with the Individual Support Grant (2019).

== Public collections ==
- Brooklyn Museum, Brooklyn, NY
- Denver Art Museum , Denver, CO
- Menil Collection, Houston, TX
- Nasher Sculpture Center, Dallas, TX
- Museum of Fine Arts of New Mexico, Santa Fe, NM
- Museum für Konkrete Kunst, Ingolstadt, Germany
- The Maxine & Stuart Frankel Foundation for Art, Bloomfield Hills, MI
- University of New Mexico Art Museum, Albuquerque, NM
- Yale University, Beinecke Library, New Haven, CT

== Works and publications ==
- York, Susan (4 December 2005). "Geese Flying". The New York Times.
- York, Susan; Lippard, Lucy R (essays by); Karp, Diane R (essays by) (2008). Susan York: 3 Columns. Santa Fe, NM: Lannan Foundation. OCLC 602020615.
- Sze, Arthur (poems by); York, Susan (drawings by); Yau, John (2013). The Unfolding Center. Santa Fe, New Mexico: Radius Books. ISBN 978-1-934-43569-4. OCLC 959622191.
