= The Caveman (1915 film) =

1915 film by Theodore Marston

- Directed by: Theodore Marston
- Written by: Marguerite Bertsch
- Based on: play, The Caveman, by Gelett Burgess
- Produced by: Vitagraph Company of America
- Starring: Robert Edeson
- Cinematography: Reginald E. Lyons
- Distributed by: V-L-S-E
- Release date: November 29, 1915
- Running time: 5 reels

The Caveman is a lost 1915 silent film comedy directed by Theodore Marston and starring Robert Edeson. It was produced by the Vitagraph Company of America and is based on a 1911 stage play, The Caveman. Several of the scenes were filmed in the Homestead Steelworks.

It is based on a 1911 play by Gelette Burgess. The play starred Robert Edeson. The story was refilmed by Warner Brothers in 1926.

== Cast ==
- Robert Edeson - Hanlick Smagg
- Fay Wallace - Madeline Mischief
- Lillian Burns - Dolly Van Dream
- George De Beck - Brewster Bradford
- Frances Connelly - Mrs. Van Dream
- John T. Kelly - Mr. Van Dream
- Charles Eldridge - Theodore Glush
- William Sellery - Solomon Huggins
- Chick Morrison - Manager of Steel Plant
