= Seven Sinners (1925 film) =

1925 film by Lewis Milestone

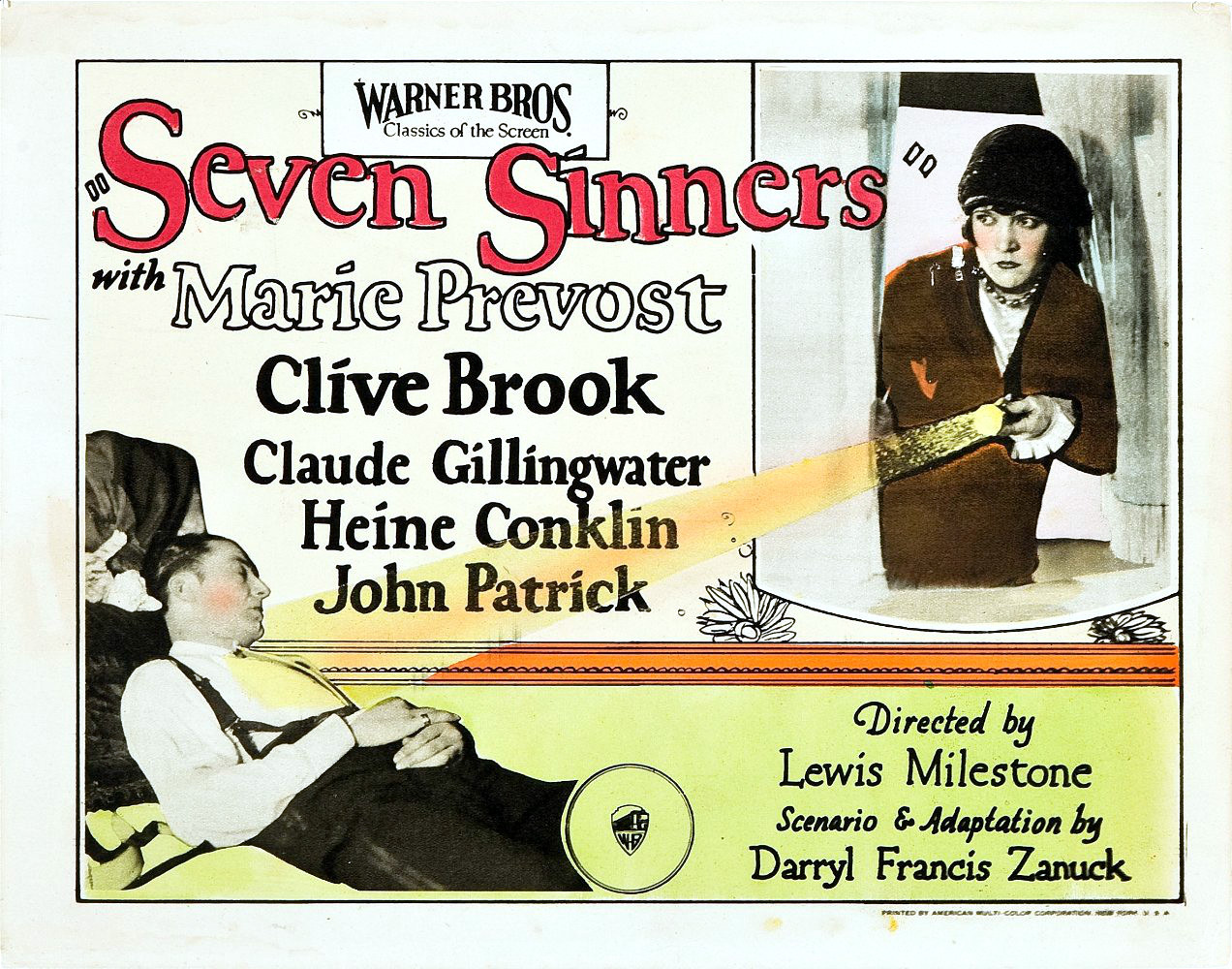
- Lobby card
- Directed by: Lewis Milestone
- Screenplay by: Lewis Milestone
- Story by: Lewis Milestone; Darryl F. Zanuck
- Produced by: Howard Hughes
- Starring: Marie Prevost; Clive Brook; John Patrick; Heinie Conklin
- Cinematography: David Abel
- Production company: Warner Bros.
- Distributed by: Warner Bros.
- Release date: November 7, 1925 (US)
- Running time: 68 minutes (7 reels)
- Country: United States
- Language: Silent (English intertitles)

Seven Sinners is a 1925 American black-and-white silent comedy crime film directed by Lewis Milestone and written by Milestone and Darryl F. Zanuck. The film was produced by Warner Bros.

Although Milestone had directed short training films for the U.S. War Department in 1918 and 1919, and acted as assistant director on the 1921 William A. Seiter film The Foolish Age, this was his feature film directorial debut.

== Plot ==
Burglars Molly Brian and Joe Hagney break into the Vickers mansion on Long Island and loot the safe but are caught in the act by another crook, Jerry Winters, who takes the money from them. The three are confronted by Pious Joe McDowell and his wife Mamie, also crooks, but who assert themselves as friends of the Vickers family. Molly, Joe, and Jerry introduce themselves in turn as Vickers' household servants. A doctor arrives with his patient and quarantines the house. Unknown to the first five, the Doctor and patient are also crooks who use the ruse of a "quarantine" as part of their own methodology. During the brief quarantine, Molly ends up falling in love with Jerry and the two pledge to go straight. When the police finally arrive, Pious Joe takes responsibility for the robbery so that Molly and Jerry can escape.

== Cast ==
- Marie Prevost as Molly Brian
- Clive Brook as Jerry Winters
- John Patrick as Handsome Joe Hagney
- Heinie Conklin as Scarlet Fever Sanders
- Claude Gillingwater as Pious Joe McDowell
- Mathilde Brundage as Mamie McDowell
- Dan Mason as Doctor
- Fred Kelsey as Policeman

== Contemporary reception ==
The New York Times wrote the idea "has been worked out in an interesting fashion, with disappointing penitence as a closing touch," and that "picture is quite diverting, and it would have been even better if the humor were lighter in some sequences and if a touch of satire had been included at the finish."

== Legacy ==
=== Preservation status ===
The film was presumed lost when Jack L. Warner destroyed many of its negatives in December 1948 due to nitrate decomposition of pre-1933 films, but an announcement was made in May 2015 of its rediscovery in Queensland, Australia, by lost film hunter Joel Archer.

Seven Sinners was preserved by the Academy Film Archive in 2017. The restored version of Seven Sinners was shown in Queensland, Australia, on February 19, 2017.

== See also ==
- List of rediscovered films
