= Melba (film) =

1953 film by Lewis Milestone

- Theatrical poster
- Directed by: Lewis Milestone
- Screenplay by: Harry Kurnitz
- Story by: Harry Kurnitz
- Produced by: Sam Spiegel
- Starring: Patrice Munsel; Robert Morley; John McCallum
- Cinematography: Arthur Ibbetson; Edward Scaife
- Edited by: Bill Lewthwaite
- Music by: Muir Mathieson; Mischa Spoliansky
- Production company: Horizon Pictures
- Distributed by: United Artists
- Release date: 24 June 1953 (US theatrical)
- Running time: 112 minutes
- Country: United Kingdom
- Language: English

Melba is a 1953 musical biopic drama film of the life of Australian soprano Nellie Melba, written by Harry Kurnitz and directed by Lewis Milestone for Horizon Pictures, marking the film debut of the Metropolitan Opera's Patrice Munsel.

== Plot ==
Based on the life of Dame Nellie Melba, the film traces the career of Melba (Patrice Munsel) from the time she left Australia, traveling to Paris to receive vocal training, meets a new suitor, and debuts her talent in Brussels. As her success grows, her former suitor from Australia arrives in Monte Carlo, convinces her to marry him, but then finds himself placed in the position of being "Mr. Melba". When he leaves her to return to Australia, Melba remains in Europe to continue singing.

== Cast ==
- Patrice Munsel as Nellie Melba
- Robert Morley as Oscar Hammerstein I
- John McCallum as Charles Armstrong
- John Justin as Eric Walton
- Alec Clunes as Cesar Carlton
- Martita Hunt as Mathilde Marchesi
- Sybil Thorndike as Queen Victoria
- Joseph Tomelty as Thomas Mitchell
- Beatrice Varley as Aunt Catherine
- Theodore Bikel as Paul Brotha

== Production ==
=== Development ===
In January 1952, upon completion of the Melba story treatment by Harry Kurnitz, producer Sam Spiegel and his attorney flew to London with the script in-hand to acquire film rights for her story from Melba's estate.

In May 1952, Spiegel reported that the film was to be shot on locations in Australia and Britain with Patrice Munsel cast as Nellie Melba.

Upon release of the information, representatives of the J. Arthur Rank organization expressed surprise, as they had themselves been planning a film about Melba. They had hoped to get Marjorie Lawrence for their own film and, when unable to do so, had even considered using actual recordings Melba's voice dubbed over that of an actress. They decided to put their plans on hold until they could find a suitable singer/actress for the lead role.

In June 1952 Spiegel announced the film would be made as the first in a four picture deal he had with United Artists. Munsel's casting was announced in July.

One of Spiegel's early choices for director was Charles Vidor. In July 1952, Spiegel flew to Paris to speak with him.

Spiegel then hired Edmund Goulding as director. Pre-production for the film was being done in Paris, and Patrice Munsel and her husband arranged a second honeymoon in that city.

At one stage Lewis Gilbert was going to direct.

When problems arose with Goulding, Spiegel fired him and hired Lewis Milestone to direct.

The change of directors disheartened Munsel, as she had been looking forward to working with Goulding, and she found Milestone to be "more traffic cop than auteur". She had also anticipated a script that would allow her to play Melba as the "gutsy, difficult, strong-minded" person she really was, and was disappointed that the Kurnitz script "was essentially a plot-less, soft-centered love story built around a long string of opera sequences."

=== Shooting ===
Filming started in August 1952.

By September 1952, Patrice Munsel had recorded all her songs for the film, and plans were being made to construct "Australian" sets on the Wiltshire plains. While Munsel's voice impressed critics, she did not resemble Dame Melba, with the biggest contrast being her American accent. When asked of her role, Munsel stated [sic] "We are not attempting to re-create Melba. We are simply paying tribute to her as a great singer in a way that will bring popular entertainment to the masses."

Theodore Bikel wrote in his autobiography that because of Milestone's background, this was a felicitous choice by Sam Spiegel, as Milestone was an award-winning director with a great touch. There was however, a growing frustration between Spiegel and Milestone, both on set and off. After months of filming with growing tensions, and three days before the last scene was to be shot, a confrontation between the two caused Milestone to walk of the set and not return.

== Critical response ==
The New York Times reported that the film was essentially one song after another and, listing the numerous works that were shared in the film, wrote "Even though jumbled together in an excessive, haphazard way, this massive mélange of mighty music is the meager salvation of the film." The reviewer, Bosley Crowther, offered that, while the task of portraying the life of Nellie Melba was laudable as a concept, the "storybook tale of an opera singer that Harry Kurnitz has put together is a mere offense to the taste and credulity of an average numskull, and it is assembled and played with little more sense." They disapproved of the plot which portrayed Melba as "silly and vapid", whose character then "comes out flat and gauche". They offered the storyline was "sticky and banal" and "overloaded with such obvious twaddle about ambition and success."

Conversely, The Spokesman-Review felt the film was a "worthy climax to her [Patrice Munsel] spectacular opera and concert career." They wrote that of the many films that attempted to adapt opera to the film media, this one is the best. They acknowledged that while the film was "broadly sentimental", it was appealing. And that even though the storyline did not factually follow the life of Nellie Melba, "it suggests its glory and glamour and completely enthralls the audience." They write that "Munsel is magnificent", and that even while not being photogenic in the Australian shot scenes depicting Melba's life as a cowgirl, once Melba is brought to Europe, "she is most attractive." Listing the many songs sung by Munsel, they made note of the attending audience applauding each, and wrote "Her singing is magnificent, and she is an actress of sufficient poise to carry complete conviction." The praised the supporting cast and Lewis Milestone's craftmanship as a director.

Evan Senior, the Australian-born editor of Music and Musicians stated "No, I do not have to wonder what Melba would have to say about Melba. Her command of blistering invective far outshone anything I could summon up. She would have blasted the whole film from its wide screen."

Munsel later joked "If I had seen me in Melba, I never would have hired me to do anything."

== Soundtrack ==
- "Ballet music" from the opera Robert le diable by Giacomo Meyerbeer
- "Comin' Through the Rye", words by Robert Burns
- "Ave Maria", composed by Johann Sebastian Bach and Charles Gounod
- "O luce di quest' anima", from Linda di Chamounix, composed by Gaetano Donizetti, libretto by Gaetano Rossi
- "Serenade", composed by Charles Gounod
- "Caro nome" from Rigoletto, composed by Giuseppe Verdi, libretto by Francesco Maria Piave
- "The Mad Scene", from Lucia di Lammermoor, composed by Gaetano Donizetti, libretto by Salvadore Cammarano
- "Chacun le sait" from La fille du régiment, composed by Gaetano Donizetti, libretto by Jules-Henri Vernoy de Saint-Georges and Jean-François Bayard
- "Una voce poco fa" from Il barbiere di Siviglia, composed by Gioachino Rossini, libretto by Cesare Sterbini
- "O soave fanciulla" from La bohème, composed by Giacomo Puccini, libretto by Giuseppe Giacosa and Luigi Illica
- "Voi che sapete" from Le nozze di Figaro, composed by Wolfgang Amadeus Mozart, libretto by Lorenzo Da Ponte
- "Aria", from Faust, composed by Charles Gounod, libretto by Jules Barbier and Michel Carré
- "Vissi d'arte" from Tosca, composed by Giacomo Puccini, libretto by Giuseppe Giacosa and Luigi Illica
- "Brindisi" from La traviata, composed by Giuseppe Verdi, libretto by Francesco Maria Piave
- "O pur bonheur", from Roméo et Juliette, composed by Charles Gounod, libretto by Jules Barbier and Michel Carré
- "On Wings of Song", composed by Felix Mendelssohn
- "Dreamtime", composed by Mischa Spoliansky, lyrics by Norman Newell
- "Is This the Beginning of Love?", written by Mischa Spoliansky
