= CAVEman =

CAVEman is a 4D high-resolution model of a functioning human elaborated by the University of Calgary. It resides in a cube-shaped virtual reality room, like a cave, also known as the "research holodeck", in which the human model floats in space, projected from three walls and the floor below. The model is intended to be used for medical research and modelling, where the effects of medical phenomena with genetic components, such as cancer, diabetes and Alzheimer's disease can be studied virtually. The high-resolution hologram can be scaled up and down in size to study processes at the micro level.
