= Troglodyte =

A troglodyte is a human cave dweller, from the Greek trṓglē 'hole, mouse-hole' and dúō 'go in, dive in'.

Troglodyte and derived forms may also refer to:

== Historiography ==
- Troglodytae or Troglodyti, an ancient group of people from the African Red Sea coast

== Science ==
- Homo troglodytes, an invalid taxon coined by Carl Linnaeus to refer to a legendary creature
- Pan troglodytes, the common chimpanzee
- Troglodytes (bird), a genus of small bird
- Troglodytes gorilla, an archaic synonym of the western gorilla (Gorilla gorilla)

== Arts and fiction ==
=== Music ===
- Troglodyte (band), a metal band from Kansas City
- "Troglodyte (Cave Man)", a funk song by the Jimmy Castor Bunch on their 1972 album It's Just Begun
- The Troglodytes, a British band who became known as The Troggs
- "The Troglodyte Wins", a song by American rapper and producer Busdriver on his 2007 studio album RoadKillOvercoat
- "Troglodyte", a song by Swedish post-punk band Viagra Boys on their 2022 album Cave World

=== Other media ===
- Caveman, a stock character based upon widespread concepts of the way in which early prehistoric humans may have looked and behaved
- Troglodyte, a 2009 film also known as Sea Beast
- Troglodyte (Dungeons & Dragons), a race of humanoid monsters in the game Dungeons & Dragons
- Troglodistes, a group of mole-men who live in the sewers of Paris in the film Delicatessen
- Troglodites, a fictional tribe described in Montesquieu's Persian Letters
- Troglodytes, Max Stones' lavamen workers who mine gold, in a segment from Sealab 2021
- Troglodytes, a 2010 book by Ed Lynskey
- Troglodytes, a fictional group of cave dwelling cannibals in the 2015 movie Bone Tomahawk
- Morlocks, a fictional species created by H. G. Wells for his 1895 novel, The Time Machine

== See also ==
- Trog (disambiguation)
- Troglobite, a cave animal
- Trilobite, a group of extinct marine arthropods
