= Still Dancing (musical) =

1925 musical revue produced by Charles B. Cochran

Still Dancing (or Still Dancing!) is a 1925 musical revue produced by Charles B. Cochran, with book by Arthur Wimperis and Ronald Jeans, lyrics by Philip Braham, Noble Sissle & Eubie Blake, and music by Ivor Novello, Irving Berlin, Vivian Ellis, Isham Jones and Marc Anthony. Dialogue was by Ernest Thesiger, and ballet numbers were choreographed by Leonid Massine. The cast included Alice Delysia, Joan Clarkson, Hermione Baddeley, Florence Desmond, Nigel Bruce, Douglas Byng, Richard Dolman, Walter Gore, as well as Thesiger and Massine.

The show opened at the London Pavilion on 19 November 1925 and closed on 27 February 1926, after 114 performances.

== Background ==
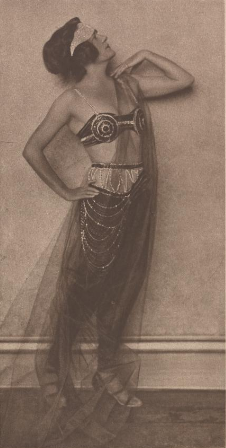
Alice Delysia, c. 1921

Still Dancing was a second edition of On with the Dance, with the original ballets retained from the original show but without any of Noël Coward's material.

In a preview published in the Weekly Dispatch on 15 November 1925, the reviewer—"B. N."—highlighted the following elements of the new show: Massine's ballet, "Pompeii à la Massine"; a scene by Aubrey Beardsley featuring Greta Fayne and Richard Dolman; a "secret" scene inspired by Gordon Selfridge; Ernest Thesiger appearing as a boxer, a Cockney, a sportsman lover, a cricketer, and a mountain climber; and French designer Jean Patou, who created 12 frocks that Alice Delysia had to change into within eight minutes. Printed alongside the preview was a photo of Felice Lascelles, with a caption reading: "Felice Lascelles, to appear in Still Dancing, the new revue at the Pavilion."

On the eve of the show's opening, the theatrical newspaper The Era summarised the new show thus: "(...) there are 27 scenes, and new songs by Braham, Novello, Sissle and Blake, Irving Berlin, Marc Anthony and others. Delysia, who will wear twenty new gowns, has been provided with "Poppy of the Pav", by Arthur Wimperis and Philip Braham; Hermione Baddeley has a song with music by Ivor Novello, entitled "The First Up Is the Best Dressed"; Greta Fayne has a "South Sea" number with Richard Dolman; Ernest Thesiger plays a variety of new roles, and there are many other changes. The Hogarth Impressions and Dance Memories will be retained. Max Rivers has produced the dances and Massine the ballets."

== Original production ==
The show opened at the London Pavilion on 19 November 1925 and closed on 27 February 1926, after 114 performances. It was directed by Charles B. Cochran, with the following programme and cast:

Still Dancing – Programme and cast (1925–1926)

Part I

Scene 1. "Lost Property Office"

- Keeper of Lost Property office – Fred Winn
- A Reporter – Lance Lister
- A Wife – Joan Clarkson
- An Elderly Lady – Violet Gould
- A Chauffeur – Nigel Bruce
- A Timid Gentleman – Douglas Byng
- A Flash Young Lady – Hermione Baddeley
- A Stranger – Ernest Thesiger

Scene 2. Song: "Poppy" (Wimperis & Ellis)

- Alice Delysia
- Terri Story, Greta Beronius, Vera Bryer, Averil Haley, Decilia Mobray, Noranna Rose, Nancy Barnett, Nora Lorrimore, Florence Desmond, Felice Lascelles, Clare Watson, Thalia Barberova, William Cavanagh, Billy Reynolds, Kenneth Henry, Fred Wallace, Jean Perrie, Donald Neville

Scene 3. "At the Fight"

- Bill – Douglas Byng
- Alf – Nigel Bruce
- Sid – Lance Lister
- Ivy – Hermione Baddeley
- Attendant – Ernest Thesiger
- A Lady – Joan Clarkson
- Her Son – Herbert Richards
- M.C. – Ernest Lindsay

Scene 4. "Still Dancing"

- The Hussars – Decilia Mobray, Nancy Barnett, Nora Lorrimore, Thalia Barberova
- Danse Eccentrique – Florence Desmond
- Valse Moderne – Greta Beronius
- The Faun – Terri Story
- Old Moscow – Vera Bryer
- The River Rag – Felice Lascelles, Florence Desmond, Clare Watson, Noranna Rose, Terri Story, Decilia Mobray, Nora Lorrimore, Greta Beronius, Averil Haley, Thalia Barberova, Vera Bryer, Nancy Barnett

Scene 5. "Number 13"

- Ruby – Hermione Baddeley
- Young Doctor – Nigel Bruce
- A Postman – Ernest Lindsay
- A Lady Journalist – Joan Clarkson

Scene 6. "The Rake" A Hogarth Impression (Choreography by Leonide Massine: Music by Roger Quilter)

- First Dancer – Greta Fayne
- Second Dancer – Greta Beronius
- Third Dancer – Betty Oliver
- Posture Woman – Florence Desmond
- Corset Woman – Eleanora Marra
- First Fat Woman – Ernest Lindsay
- Second Fat Woman – Violet Gould
- The Rake – Terry Kendall
- Musicians:
  - The Dog – Helen Gardom
  - The Bull – Edith Tooley
  - The Cat – William Cavanagh
  - The Cock – Billy Reynolds
- The Woman with Bound Hair – Laurie Devine
- The Thin Man – Richard Dolman
- The Beau – Leonide Massine
- Man Dancer – Jean Perrie
- Boot Man – Donald Neville
- Giant – Kenneth Henry
- Globe Man – Fred Wallace
- Man with Compass – Fred Winn
- Cupid – Arthur Howe
- Coloured Woman – Emma Williams
- Dances:
  - Trio – Greta Fayne, Greta Beronius, Betty Oliver
  - Solo – Eleanora Marra
  - Duo – Eleanora Marra and Leonide Massine
- Entrance of Grotesques – Donald Neville, Kenneth Henry, Laurie Devine

Scene 7. "Remember" (Music and Words by Irving Berlin)

- Yvonne – Alice Delysia
- Major Hamilton – Nigel Bruce
- Maid – Jessie Taylor

Scene 8. Song: "South Sea Blues" (Wimperis & Ellis)

- The Man – Richard Dolman
- The Maid – Greta Fayne
- Mr. Gloom – Douglas Byng

Empire Theatre, 1890
Song: "Georgie" (Chateau and Albertino)

- Yvonne – Alice Delysia
- Gaiety Theatre, 1888
- Pas de Quatre (Meyer Luis)
- Greta Beronius, Vera Bryer, Thalia Barberova, Terri Story

Moulin Rouge, 1888–1890
"Quadrille" (Offenbach)

- La Goulue – Greta Fayne
- Grille d'Egout – Josephine Head
- Casque d'Or – Pat Kendall
- La Melinite – Laurie Devine
- Valentin le Desosse – Terry Kendall

Scene 9. "Gown and Out" or "The Animals Went in Tout-Pa-Tout"

- Magenta Slipp-Boddys – Alice Delysia
- Sir John Slipp-Boddys – Nigel Bruce
- Geoffrey Blazer – Ernest Thesiger
- Sir Rupert Slumberware – Lance Lister
- Georgette (Magenta's Maid) – Vera Bryer

Scene 10. "Still Dancing" (Braham)
Hermione Baddeley, Richard Dolman and Greta Beronius, Vera Bryer, Felice Lascelles, Nancy Barnett, Nora Lorrimore, Terri Story, Florence Desmond, Averil Haley, Decilia Mobray, Noranna Rose, Thalia Barberova, Clare Watson

- The Dancers:
1. Greta Fayne and Max Rivers
2. Vera Bryer, Florence Desmond, Terri Story, Decilia Mobray, Nancy Barnett, Thalia Barberova, Douglas Byng, Billy Reynolds, Kenneth Henry, Fred Wallace, William Cavanagh, Jean Perrie
3. Pat and Terry Kendall
4. Laurie Devine
5. Head and Zapp

Finale – Part I

- Alice Delysia and Entire Company

Part II

Scene 11. "A Hungarian Wedding"

- The Bride – Greta Fayne
- The Bridegroom – Terry Kendall
- The Best Man – Jean Perrie
- The Chief Bridesmaid – Pat Kendall
- The Groom's Man – Kenneth Henry
- The Second Bridesmaid – Laurie Devine
- The Maid of Honour – Jessie Taylor
- Serving Men – Fred Wallace and Billy Reynolds
- The Host – Nigel Bruce
- The Hostess – Alice Delysia
- The Congratulating Boys – Donald Neville, Ernest Lindsay
- Little Girls – Edith Tooley, Averil Haley
- Little Boys – Louie Bermon, Walter Gore
- Horse Boys – Betty Oliver, Greta Beronius, Felice Lascelles, Terri Story, Clare Watson, Nancy Barnett, Vera Bryer
- Peasant Girls – Nora Lorrimore, Florence Desmond, Decilia Mobray, Noranna Rose, Thalia Barberova
- The Highwayman – Leonide Massine
- Gipsy Girl – Eleanora Marra
- Song: "Hungarian Song" (Anderson & Bela) – Alice Delysia

Scene 12. "Shades of Shakespeare"
Prologue

- An Elderly Actor – Fred Winn
- A Young Actor – Richard Dolman
- Characters in Play:
  - Candelabra – Joan Clarkson
  - Tantalus (Her Butler) – William Cavanagh
  - Asbestos (Lover of Candelabra) – Ernest Thesiger
- Guests:
  - Caramel – Dorothea Varda
  - Nujol – Lance Lister
  - Ovaltine – Sybil Wise
  - Organdy – Douglas Byng
- Gospo (Husband of Candelabra) – Nigel Bruce
- Bodega – Hermione Baddeley

Scene 13. "That Means Nothing To Me"

- Alice Delysia

Scene 14. "Pompeii À La Massine" (Choreography by Massine: Music by Louis Ganne and others)

- Ariadne – Josephine Head
- Attendant Cupid – Averil Haley
- Master of the Ceremonies – Douglas Byng
- Gazelle-Girl – Laurie Devine
- Peacock-Girl – Dorothea Varda
- Leopard-Girl – Clare Watson
- Dove-Girl – Thalia Barberova
- Caterpillar – Greta Fayne
- Flowers – Betty Oliver, Greta Beronius, Terri Story
- Blacksmith – Percy Val
- Alchemist – Eleanora Marra
- Customers – Jean Perrie, Donald Neville
- The Chinese Visitor – Leonide Massine

Scene 15. "I Am Tired of Everything but You" (Isham Jones)

- Pat and Terry Kendall

Scene 16. "The Pattern Wife"

- John Caravel – Ernest Thesiger
- Enid Caravel – Alice Delysia
- Helen Dering – Hermione Baddeley
- Parlour Maid – Kate Strudwick

Scene 17. "3 a.m."

- Percy Val

Scene 18. "The First Up Is the Best Dressed"
Hermione Baddeley and Terri Story, Greta Beronius, Nancy Barnett, Vera Bryer, Averil Haley, Decilia Mobray, Nora Lorrimore, Florence Desmond

Scene 19. "Two's Company"

- Clare – Alice Delysia
- Dennis – Lance Lister
- George – Nigel Bruce

Scene 20. "Pyjama Jazz" (Wimperis and Anthony)

1. Nancy Barnett, Greta Beronius, Decilia Mobray, Nora Lorrimore, Florence Desmond, Vera Bryer, Clare Watson, Terri Story
2. Richard Dolman, Lance Lister, William Cavanagh, Billy Reynolds, Kenneth Henry, Fred Wallace, Jean Perrie
3. Ensemble: Ernest Thesiger, Douglas Byng, Nigel Bruce, Donald Neville, Ernest Lindsay, Sybil Wise, Hermione Baddeley, Kate Strudwick, Dorothea Varda, Jessie Taylor, Noranna Rose, Paula York, Betty Oliver, Edith Tooley, Felice Lascelles, Helen Gardom, Averil Haley
4. Pat and Terry Kendall
5. Eleanora Marra
6. Laurie Devine
7. Leonide Massine
8. Head and Zapp
9. Greta Fayne and Max Rivers
10. Alice Delysia

Finale – The Entire Company

Orchestra under the direction of J. B. Hastings

== Songs ==
- "Poppy" (Wimperis & Ellis/Braham)
- "Remember" (Music and Words by Irving Berlin)
- "South Sea Blues" (Wimperis & Ellis)
- "Georgie" (Chateau and Albertino)
- "Still Dancing" (Braham)
- "Hungarian Song" (Anderson & Bela)
- "I Am Tired of Everything but You" (Isham Jones)
- "The First Up is the Best Dressed" (Wimperis & Novello)
- "Pyjama Jazz" (Wimperis and Anthony)

== Ballets ==
- "The Rake" A Hogarth Impression (Choreography by Leonide Massine: Music by Roger Quilter)
- "A Hungarian Wedding" (Produced by Massine: Music by Imre Magyari and Tzigane Orchestra)
- "Pompeii À La Massine" (Choreography by Massine: Music by Louis Ganne and others)

== Critical reception ==
The day after the opening, on 20 November, the Aberdeen Press and Journal reviewer wrote that "Still Dancing is the most spectacular revue in town, but it is also the most undressed", and speculated that "[i]t must have cost the producers many thousands of pounds in dresses alone, particularly in the scene depicting a Hungarian wedding." The reviewer also complained that "[t]here is a lack of humour about this revue, but one cannot have everything, and certainly Still Dancing is a sufficient attraction without that ancillary to successful revue." The same day, Hubert Griffith in the London Daily Chronicle noted that "Mr. Cochran's sequel to On With the Dance at the London Pavilion, still contains almost as amazing a series of acrobatics as ever." He also mentioned that, of all the sketches, "one, a blank-verse version of Spring Cleaning, is witty", and singled out for praise "Greta Beronius (...), Mr. Percy Val, Mr. Nigel Bruce (very good), Mr. Thesiger, Mdlle. Delysia, and Miss Hermione Baddeley (...)" Finally he quipped that "there is a certain economy about most of the dance costumes, and citizens of Birmingham should keep away."

On 21 November, the Western Mail in Cardiff gushed that Still Dancing, as a sequel to On with the Dance, "is even a more brilliant production than its predecessor. (...) It abounds in beautiful spectacles, and it has melodious music and humour", and that "Delysia arrayed as the Queen of Sheba continues to be the outstanding artiste in the production." The same day, the Daily Herald reviewer—"M. E."—stated that "[f]ifty per cent. of On With the Dance has been retained in Still Dancing. (...) It is none the less excellent for that, and is easily the best spectacular show now running", adding that "[r]ival revue producers must spend sleepless nights wondering where Mr. C. B. Cochrane finds all his beautiful and gifted dancing girls." Still on 21 November, the Birmingham Daily Post reviewer remarked that "[t]he dances are principally old material, or at least indistinguishable from the old, whereas the sketches have been replaced in their entirety", adding that a "clever idea (...) was a sketch of a drama written by the costumiers for the display of their creations. It gives Delysia a chance to wear an astonishing number of scanty and beautiful garments, as does the entire revue." The same reviewer complained that "[o]n the whole the sketches tend to enhance the reputation of the former author, Mr. Noel Coward, who is now unrepresented", but praised Ernest Thesiger, "a consummate actor, who can lend point to the feeblest dialogue and make himself heard at all times."

On 25 November, the theatrical newspaper The Era wrote that the new revue "now has a stronger framework of comedy and is all the better for it", concluding that "Still Dancing, with its magnificent decorations, its colour and music and the excellent comedy should fill the London Pavilion for months to come." The next day, in The Stage, the reviewer praised many of the company's artists, as "clever performers [who] go to make up one of the brightest of dancing shows in recent years", closing the review with: "The unmistakable Cochran touch is over all. It is the touch of a showman whose love of lavish display is tempered by something of a poet's penetrating imagination and a painter's taste for colour harmony." On 28 November, J. L. R. Corpel wrote in the Marylebone Mercury, that "[i]t is a real joyous entertainment given at a breathless pace not only as a tempo, but as to beauty, dialogue, and fun, all of which afford great delight", and concluded that "exquisitely dressed and designed, polished to every small detail, Still Dancing will receive the homage of everyone."

Most reviewers singled out for praise, both the new sketches, such as "Shades of Shakespeare" (a blank verse edition of the second act of Spring Cleaning) "and one of the wittiest burlesques ever put into a revue", as well as Massine's new ballet, "Pompeii à la Massine", highlighted as "a clever ballet arranged by M. Leonide Massine from materials suggested by Pompeian frescoes."
