= Evelyn Laye =

English actress (1900–1996)

Evelyn Laye CBE
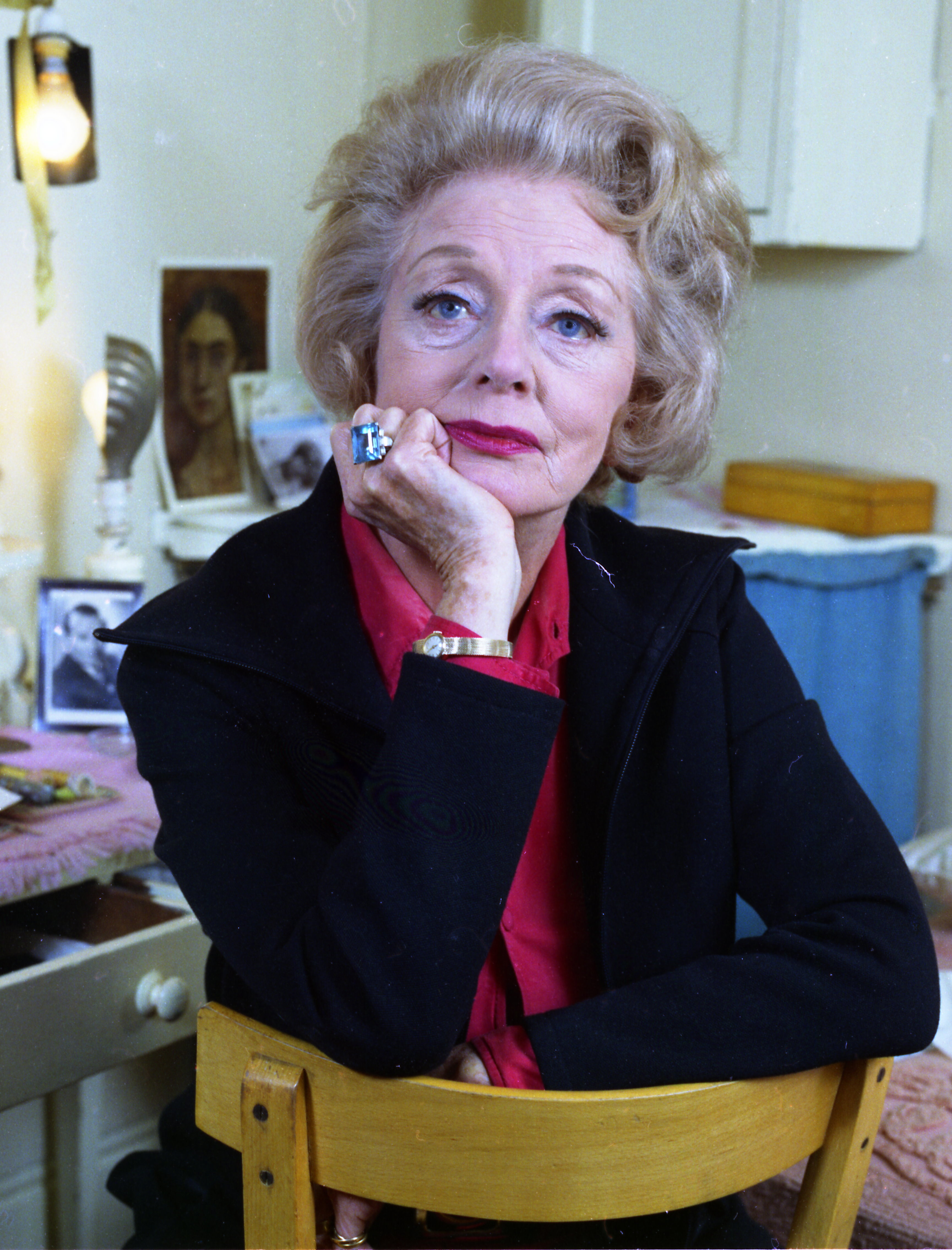
- Born: Elsie Evelyn Lay; 10 July 1900; Bloomsbury, London, England
- Died: 17 February 1996 (aged 95); London, England
- Occupations: Actress; singer
- Years active: 1915–1992
- Spouses: Sonnie Hale (m. 1926; div. 1930) Frank Lawton (m. 1934; died 1969)

Evelyn Laye (née Elsie Evelyn Lay; 10 July 1900 – 17 February 1996) was an English actress and singer known for her performances in operettas and musicals.

Born into a theatrical family, she made her professional début in 1915 aged fifteen, and quickly established herself in musical comedy. By 1920 she was starring in leading roles in the West End at Daly's and other theatres, becoming London's highest-paid star. Her first marriage, in 1926, to the performer Sonnie Hale was brief, and ended in divorce after he left her for the actress Jessie Matthews.

Laye made her American debut in 1929, starring in Noël Coward's musical Bitter Sweet. In the 1930s, she divided her time between the West End and Broadway, also starring in American and British films.

She entertained naval personnel during the Second World War. Afterwards, when fashion turned against the romantic musicals in which she had made her reputation, Laye was frequently seen on the non-musical stage, appearing both in the classics, such as The School for Scandal, and in new plays, often together with her second husband, the actor Frank Lawton. She was in several long-running comedies, including The Amorous Prawn in the 1950s and No Sex Please, We're British in the 1970s. In addition, she appeared in post-war musicals, both American and British.

Laye was still working into her early nineties, and appeared at Carnegie Hall in New York in 1991 in a concert of Coward's music. She died in London in 1996, aged 95.

== Life and career ==
=== Early years ===
Laye, aged three, making her stage début

Elsie Evelyn Lay (known to her family and friends as "Boo") was born in Bloomsbury, London, on 10 July 1900, the only child of Gilbert James Lay (1866–1926) and his wife Evelyn née Froud. Both parents were actors, and Gilbert Lay, whose stage name was Gilbert Laye, was also a manager; for some years he ran the Brighton Palace Pier. His wife was well known for playing principal boy in provincial pantomimes under her stage name, Evelyn Stuart. The younger Evelyn was educated at Folkestone and Brighton.

Laye made her stage début at the age of three, walking on in a production at Folkestone, but she dated her theatrical career from August 1915, when she appeared at the Theatre Royal, Brighton in the melodrama Mr Wu. Her father did not wish her to follow a stage career, but she persisted.

After touring in Mr Wu in the role of Hilda Gregory, Laye made her first London appearance at the East Ham Palace on 24 April 1916, aged 15, in the revue Honi Soit, in which she subsequently toured. Back in London, at the Gaiety she took over the role of Leonie Bramble in The Beauty Spot (1918); later in the year, at the same theatre, she played Madeleine Manners in Going Up, and in 1920 she had the principal female role, Bessie Brent, in a revival of the 1894 show The Shop Girl. The original score was revised for this production and Herman Darewski and Arthur Wimperis added "The Guards' Brigade", a lively march number in which Laye, dressed as a drum majorette, led a 60-piece marching band of real guardsmen.

=== West End star ===
In August 1922 Laye appeared as Prologue and Helen in the opérette Phi-Phi at the London Pavilion; her co-stars were Stanley Lupino, Arthur Roberts and Clifton Webb. She was then engaged for Daly's Theatre, where she consolidated her position as a top star, appearing in May 1923 in the title role in a revival of The Merry Widow, with a cast that included Carl Brisson, Derek Oldham and George Graves. The Stage commented, "Miss Evelyn Laye is most charming as the Widow, both vocally and histrionically, and her impersonation, as a whole, must be taken as the crowning point of her career to date".

Madame Pompadour, 1923

Remaining at Daly's after the run of The Merry Widow, Laye had what several London newspapers described as a triumph in Madame Pompadour, an adaptation of a Viennese operetta by Leo Fall. The critic J. T. Grein wrote, "Evelyn Laye casts all her contemporary rivals into the shade ... Her complete success raises her to the leadership of her genre". The piece had, for its day, an unusually long run, with 469 performances.

Her next two starring roles were also at Daly's: Alice in a new production of Fall's 1909 musical The Dollar Princess, and the title role in Cleopatra (music by Oscar Straus, words by Harry Graham). On one occasion during the run of the latter she wore jewels, lent by a Parisian jeweller, worth £30,000 (nearly £2m in 2022 terms). Her career at Daly's made her the most successful musical and operetta star – and the highest-paid star in any genre – in the West End. In the view of The Times, she was both careful and wise to stay for the moment in that area – "the highly costumed world of Viennese elegance and soaring melody ... rather than enter the more crowded world of revue where Jessie Matthews, Gertrude Lawrence and Beatrice Lillie were all fighting for supremacy".

In January 1926, Laye made her first radio broadcasts for 2LO, the forerunner of the BBC. On 10 April of that year, she married John Robert Hale Monro, an actor whose stage name was Sonnie Hale. The marriage was not a success; within a year Laye found love letters written to Hale by Matthews, with whom he was then co-starring in C. B. Cochran's revue This Year of Grace, in which they sang a romantic duet by Noël Coward, "A Room with a View". Hale left, and subsequently married Matthews.

In April 1928 Laye starred in the opening production of the Piccadilly Theatre, Blue Eyes, a musical with words by Guy Bolton and Graham John and music by Jerome Kern; it ran at the Piccadilly and then at Daly's for a total of 276 performances. After that, Laye was offered the leading role, Sari Linden, in Coward's new musical, Bitter Sweet, but she was so distraught by Hale's desertion that she turned the part down because the show was to be produced by Cochran, who had first brought Hale and Matthews together. She told Coward, "I'd rather scrub floors than work for him again". Bitter Sweet, with Peggy Wood in the lead, was a considerable success in London, opening on 12 July 1929 and running until 9 May 1931. Realising her mistake in passing up the role, Laye made certain she was available to star in the Broadway production, which opened on 5 November 1929, her New York début.

Coward, who directed, privately recorded that Laye "knocked spots off the wretched Peggy" in the role, and praised her "grace and charm and assurance" provoking "one of the most prolonged outbursts of cheering I have ever heard in the theatre". The New York Times critic wrote of "a voice sweet in quality and full in tone, an acting and singing skill equal to that of Mr Coward's composition". Another New York critic wrote that Laye was "the fairest prima donna this side of heaven". After the New York production closed, Laye played Sari in London for the final weeks of the West End run.

=== 1930s ===
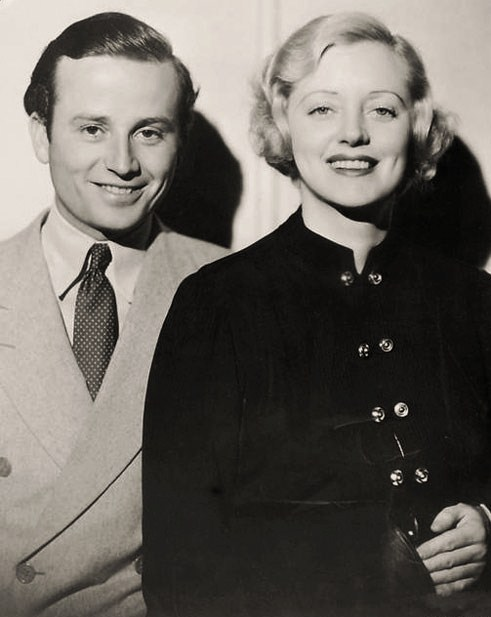
With Frank Lawton, whom she married in 1934

Through the 1930s Laye divided her time between Britain and the US. In 1931 she went to Hollywood to make the film One Heavenly Night. She played in two long-running London musicals, Helen (1932) and Give Me a Ring (1933). Her British films of the period included Waltz Time (1933), Princess Charming (1934) and Evensong (1934). In MGM's 1934 film The Night is Young she introduced Sigmund Romberg's song "When I Grow Too Old to Dream".

In 1934, having divorced Hale, Laye married her second husband, the actor Frank Lawton. The marriage lasted until his death in 1969; they had no children.

In 1935 Laye returned to the US, in a revival of Bitter Sweet in Los Angeles and then San Francisco, and appeared on Broadway in Sweet Aloes the following year. By this time, in the words of The Times, Laye "was the toast of two continents". In London Laye played Princess Anna in Paganini with Richard Tauber in the title role (1937), and in New York she played Natalie Rives in Between the Devil, co-starring with Jack Buchanan. On her return to England she made her first appearances in variety at the London Palladium in 1938, and in the same year she made her pantomime debut, as Prince Florizel in The Sleeping Beauty.

=== 1940s and 1950s ===
During the Second World War, Laye became the chairman of the naval section of ENSA, arranging entertainments for naval personnel. The BBC reported at the time that she was "indefatigable in her duties ... she has organised and appeared in concert after concert to entertain the Navy". In her own performances she focused initially on variety and revue. She was sufficiently reconciled with Cochran to appear in his 1940 revue, Lights Up, at the Savoy, co-starring with Martyn Green and Clifford Mollison. She returned to musicals in 1942, playing Violet Gray in a revival of The Belle of New York at the London Coliseum. She appeared in pantomime as Prince Charming in Cinderella at His Majesty's and the Palladium. and in March 1945 she played Katherine in Straus's Three Waltzes at the Prince's and later on tour.

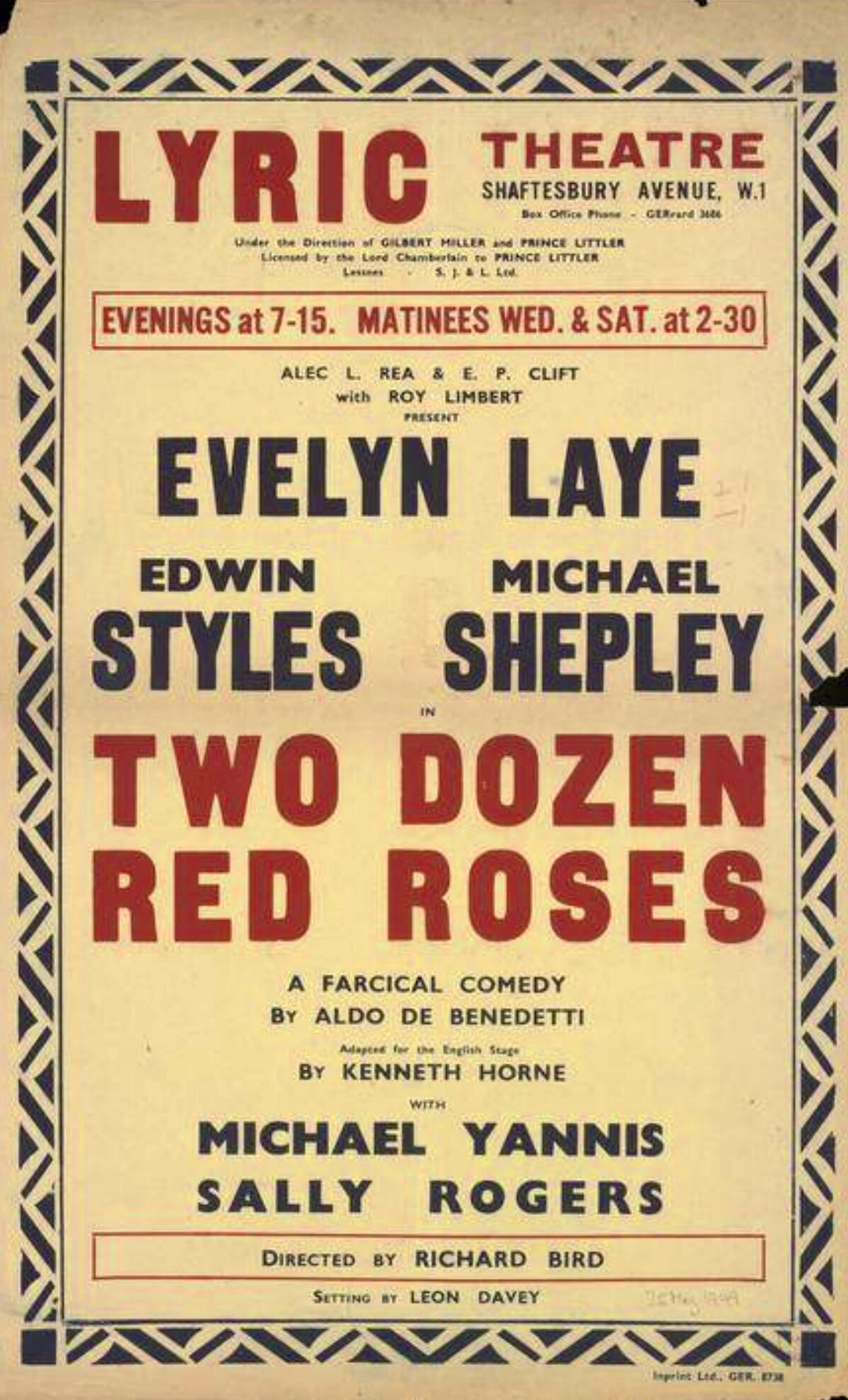
Laye's first non-musical West End play, 1949

After the war Laye's musical career suffered from a change in theatrical fashion. The romantic mid-European musicals with which she was associated were superseded on Broadway and in the West End by a new type of mainly American musicals. She began to appear in non-musical plays, touring with her husband in a new comedy, Elusive Lady (1946) and playing Lady Teazle in Basil Dean's production of The School for Scandal. Her first non-musical role in the West End was Marina in Two Dozen Red Roses, an Italian comedy adapted by Kenneth Horne, at the Lyric Theatre in May 1949. Laye and the other performers received good notices, but the play was thought weak: The Stage commented that Laye looked ravishing and carried off her role with a flourish, but "we simply longed for her to break into song". The production closed after a month. She then took over from Gertrude Lawrence in Daphne du Maurier's drama September Tide, playing alongside Lawton. In 1951 Laye and Lawton toured Australia in September Tide and John Van Druten's comedy Bell, Book and Candle.

Back in England, Laye was passed over for the leading role in the British premiere of The King and I in 1953, but made a successful return to the musical stage the following year as Marcelle Thibault in Wedding in Paris by Hans May and Vera Caspary, co-starring Anton Walbrook. Later in the decade she starred with Lawton in Silver Wedding, a non-musical comedy written for them by Michael Clayton Hutton. She published a volume of memoirs, Boo To My Friends, in 1958. She and Lawton appeared together in a revival of Coward's The Marquise, which toured in 1959. At the Saville in London she played Lady Fitzadam in the comedy The Amorous Prawn, which ran for more than two years from December 1959.

=== 1960s and 1970s ===
At the Prince of Wales Theatre in January 1964 Laye took over the role of Edith Lambert in Sumner Arthur Long's comedy Never Too Late, and in 1965 she and Lawton appeared in Somerset Maugham's 1921 comedy The Circle, first at the Ashcroft Theatre, and then at the Savoy. The Stage said that the play had worn well but:

all this fades into significance besides the reappearance of Miss Laye as Catherine Champion-Cheney. For whatever one may say about the star system, the fact remains that some have star quality and others have not and although Miss Laye's acting ability may not be unduly taxed by the role, one recognises, from her first entrance, that one is in the presence of a star".

In 1966, first at the Alhambra Theatre, Glasgow and then at the Piccadilly, Laye returned to musicals, playing Annie Besant in Strike a Light. At the Phoenix, in October 1967 she played Muriel Willoughby in a new comedy, Let's All Go Down the Strand, co-starring with Gladys Cooper. The Stage commented, "The light of sparkling entertainment invariably comes when Gladys Cooper and Evelyn Laye indulge in their individual forms of rampage".

At the Adelphi Theatre in March 1969, Laye took over the part of Lady Hadwell in the musical Charlie Girl from Anna Neagle, and at the Palace in November of that year she played Mrs Fitzmaunce in David Heneker's musical Phil the Fluter, in which she sang "They Don't Make them Like that any More", written by the composer as a tribute to her longevity on stage.

In 1971 Laye starred opposite the young Michael Crawford in a farce, No Sex Please, We're British, in which she played his mother, Eleanor Hunter. She remained in the cast after Crawford left; after giving nearly 800 performances in the role she left the run in March 1973. She was appointed CBE in 1973. In 1975 she appeared in a revival of Dodie Smith's comedy, Dear Octopus in the matriarchal role created in 1938 by Marie Tempest. In 1978 she embarked on a 16-week British tour as Mrs Higgins in Pygmalion, with Paul Daneman as Higgins and Jennifer Wilson as Eliza, before touring as Mme Armfeld in Stephen Sondheim's A Little Night Music.

=== Later years ===
In her later years Laye appeared frequently on radio and television. In 1960 she introduced a weekly series, On Stage, Everybody on the BBC Light Programme; over the next 30 years she appeared in numerous documentaries about her contemporaries and in 1990 she played Cora in Coward's Waiting in the Wings. Her other broadcasts included character roles in productions ranging from Tales of the Unexpected (1983) and Home is the Sailor (1985) for ITV, and for the BBC she played the Countess of Owbridge in The Gay Lord Quex (1983) and Mrs Kralefsky in Gerald Durrell's My Family and Other Animals (1987).

In April 1991, aged ninety, Laye returned to New York to appear at Carnegie Hall, as part of the hall's centenary celebrations, in a concert of music by Coward at which she sang, 60 years after she had first introduced it to Broadway, "I'll See You Again" from Bitter-Sweet. In 1992 she undertook a seven-week tour with the anthology Glamorous Nights at Drury Lane, which Morley records played to packed houses throughout Britain, and featured some of her most famous renderings. Morley adds that by then she was Britain's oldest working star. Her last appearance on stage was in that show at the Players' Theatre, London on 28 October 1992.

Laye died of heart failure at a nursing home in Westminster, on 17 February 1996. After a private cremation, a memorial service was held at St Paul's, Covent Garden on 2 July 1996.

== Sources ==
- Coward, Noël (2004) [1932]. Present Indicative – Autobiography to 1931. London: Methuen. ISBN 978-0-413-77413-2.
- Day, Barry, ed. (2007). The Letters of Noël Coward. London: Methuen. ISBN 978-1-4081-0675-4.
- Gaye, Freda, ed. (1967). Who's Who in the Theatre (fourteenth ed.). London: Sir Isaac Pitman and Sons. OCLC 5997224.
- Green, Stanley (1980). Encyclopedia of the Musical Theatre. New York: Da Capo. ISBN 978-0-30-680113-6.
- Herbert, Ian, ed. (1977). Who's Who in the Theatre (sixteenth ed.). London and Detroit: Pitman Publishing and Gale Research. ISBN 978-0-273-00163-8.
- Hoare, Philip (1995). Noël Coward, A Biography. London: Sinclair-Stevenson. ISBN 978-1-4081-0675-4.
- Lesley, Cole (1976). The Life of Noël Coward. London: Cape. ISBN 978-0-224-01288-1.
- Mander, Raymond; Mitchenson, Joe (1975). The Theatres of London (second ed.). London: New English Library. ISBN 978-0-45-002123-7.
- Mander, Raymond; Mitchenson, Joe (2000) [1957]. Day, Barry; Morley, Sheridan (eds.). Theatrical Companion to Coward (second ed.). London: Oberon. ISBN 978-1-84002-054-0.
