= Florence Desmond =

British actress (1904–1993)

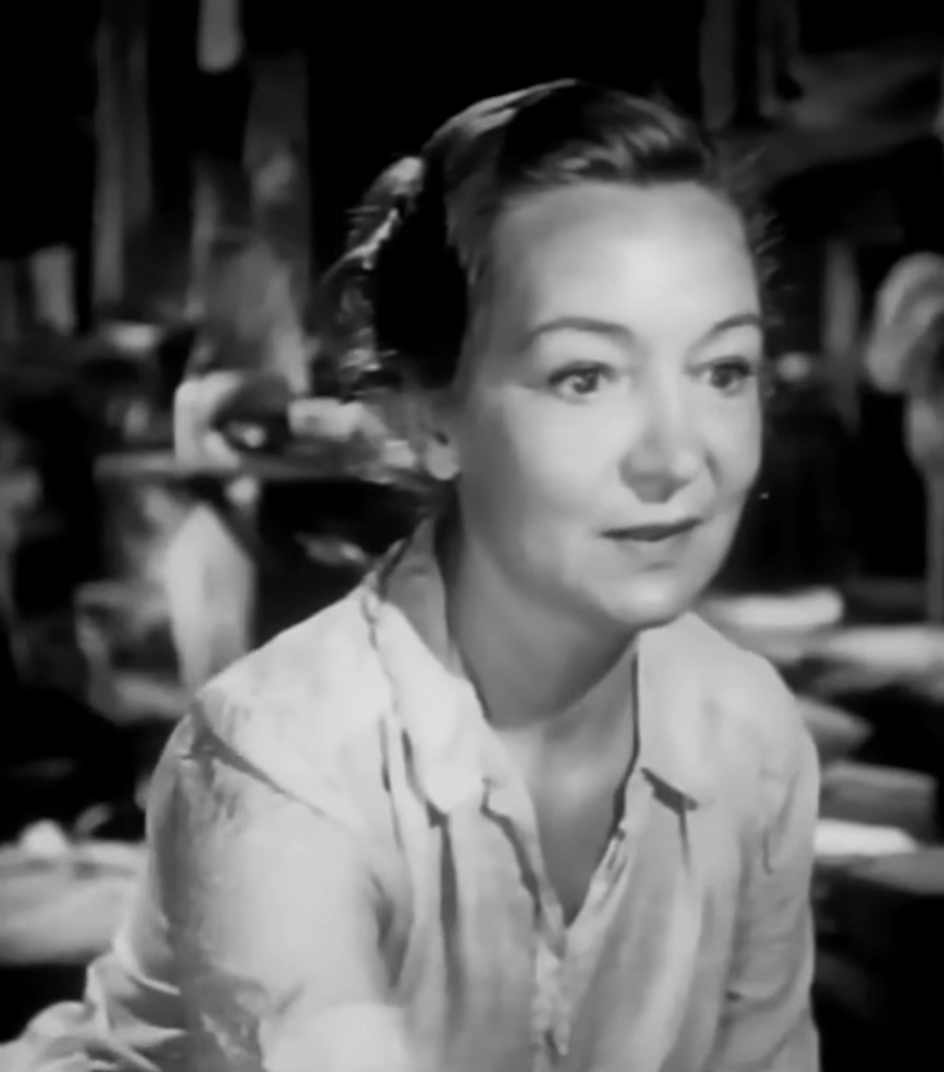
- Desmond in Three Came Home (1950)
- Born: Florence Dawson; 31 May 1905; London, England
- Died: 16 January 1993 (aged 87); Guildford, England
- Occupations: Actress; comedian; impersonator
- Years active: 1930–1969
- Spouses: Tom Campbell Black (m. 1935; died 1936) Charles Hughesdon (m. 1937)

Florence Dawson (31 May 1905 – 16 January 1993), better known by her stage name Florence Desmond, was an English actress, comedian and impersonator.

== Biography ==
=== Early life ===
Born in London in 1905, Desmond was educated at the Dame Alice Owen's School in Islington. Her brother, Fred Desmond, was a comedy acrobat from the "Desmond and Marks" double act.

=== Career ===
Desmond began her stage career at the age of ten. Upon leaving school in 1920, she embarked on a long and successful career in the theatre, making her first public appearance performing comedy in the style of Nellie Wallace. She was employed in 1925 by the impresario C. B. Cochran, and appeared in several revues. In 1928, she toured the U.S. and Canada with Noël Coward and Beatrice Lillie, in This Year of Grace.

After returning to London, she developed an act which included both songs and impersonations of famous stars, and became popular for her theatre and cabaret appearances. She also began appearing in many popular British films of the 1930s. In 1933, she appeared on BBC radio in a broadcast in which she impersonated, among others, Janet Gaynor, Greta Garbo, Jimmy Durante, Gracie Fields, and Marlene Dietrich. She repeated the performance for release as a 78 rpm record for His Master's Voice, "A Hollywood Party", which became a best-seller. After another tour of the U.S., she returned to top the bill in London, adding an impersonation of Mae West to her repertoire, and featured in the 1937 Royal Variety Performance.

She continued to tour in revues, and in 1941 starred with Max Miller and Vera Lynn in Apple Sauce, a revue which ran for over 400 performances at the London Palladium. She continued to perform regularly at the Palladium after the end of the Second World War, and in 1951 made her second and final appearance in a Royal Variety Performance. After retiring in 1954, she made a comeback in 1958 to appear with Beatrice Lillie in the play Auntie Mame in London. She was the subject of This Is Your Life in 1959 when she was surprised by Eamonn Andrews at London's Adelphi Theatre.

Her recording of the risqué song "The Deepest Shelter in Town" has been featured in multiple World War II music compilations.

=== Personal life ===
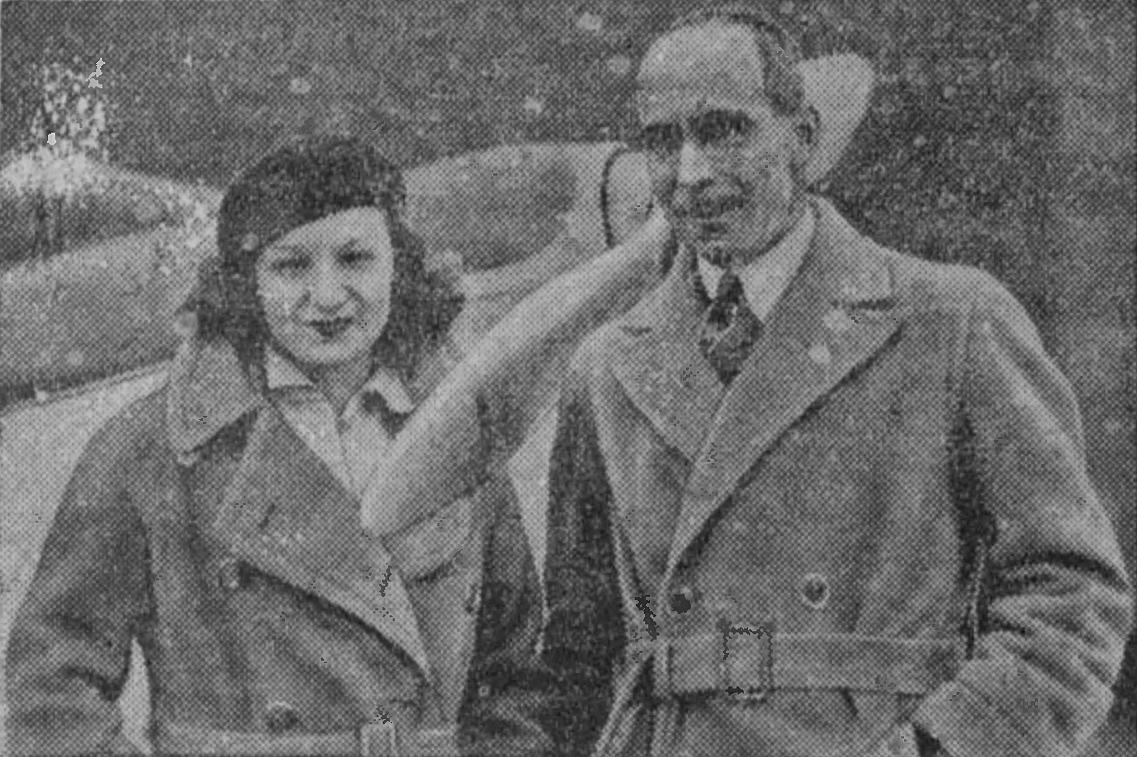
Florence Desmond & Campbell Black

She was married twice, first to the aviator Tom Campbell Black from 1935–1936 and, after Black's death, to aviator and insurance broker Charles Hughesdon from 1937 with whom she lived at Dunsborough Park in Ripley, Surrey.

She died in Guildford, Surrey, in 1993, aged 87. A ward was named after her at St. Luke's Hospital, as well as a day unit at the Royal Surrey County Hospital.

== Stage ==
- Still Dancing, 1925–1926
- This Year of Grace, 1928
- Why Not To-night?, 1933–1934
- Streamline, 1934
- Funny Side Up, 1939–1940
- Apple Sauce, 1940–1941
- If the Shoe Fits, 1946
- Under the Counter, 1947

== Filmography ==
Film
| Year | Title | Role | Notes |
|---|---|---|---|
| 1930 | The Road to Fortune | Toots Willoughby | |
| 1931 | Sally in Our Alley | Florrie Small | |
| 1932 | Murder on the Second Floor | Lucy | |
| 1932 | The Marriage Bond | Elsie | |
| 1932 | Nine till Six | Daisy | |
| 1932 | High Society | Florie | |
| 1932 | Impromptu | Herself | Short |
| 1932 | The River House Ghost | Flo | |
| 1933 | Radio Parade | Herself | |
| 1933 | Long Live the King | Florie | Short |
| 1933 | My Lucky Star | Mlle. de Capo | |
| 1933 | Mr. Skitch | Florence Desmond | |
| 1933 | I am Suzanne | | Voice, Uncredited |
| 1934 | Gay Love | Gloria Fellowes | |
| 1935 | No Limit | Florrie Dibney | |
| 1936 | Keep Your Seats, Please | Florrie | |
| 1936 | Accused | Yvette Delange | |
| 1938 | Kicking the Moon Around | Flo Hadley | |
| 1940 | Hoots Mon! | Jenny McTavish | |
| 1950 | Three Came Home | Betty Sommers | |
| 1956 | Charley Moon | Mary Minton | |
| 1969 | Some Girls Do | Lady Manderville | (final film role) |
Television
| Year | Title | Role | Notes |
| 1949 | The Texaco Star Theater | | Episode: "18 January 1949" |
| 1951 | Your Show of Shows | | Episode: "15 December 1951" |
