= This Year of Grace =

1928 musical by Noël Coward

- Waltz sequence from This Year of Grace, with dancers Jean Barry and Jack Holland
- Music: Noël Coward
- Lyrics: Noël Coward
- Book: Noël Coward
- Productions: 1928 West End and Broadway

This Year of Grace (Note: The original London title was This Year of Grace! with an exclamation mark, and the sources giving that version include Castle (p. 9); Hoare (p. 191); Mander and Mitchenson (p. 171) and Morley (p. 148). Coward himself omitted the exclamation mark in his published works Collected Sketches and Lyrics, (p. 9); Lyrics, (pp. 31–60); and Play Parade, (pp. 1–91); others omitting the exclamation mark include Day (p. 134); Lesley (p. 114}; Payn (p. 23) and Soden (p. 194)) is a revue with words and music by Noël Coward, produced by Charles B. Cochran in London in March 1928 and by Cochran and Archie Selwyn in New York in November of that year. The London cast was headed by Sonnie Hale, Jessie Matthews and Maisie Gay, and Tilly Losch choreographed and performed in dance sequences. Coward himself, together with Beatrice Lillie, starred in the New York production. The show was successful both in the West End and on Broadway, earned mostly strong notices, and introduced some of Coward's enduring songs. After an Australian tour in 1929 it was not revived, although several of the songs have been incorporated in later stage compilations of Coward's works and were performed by Coward in his cabaret appearances and recordings.

== Background ==
By 1928 Noël Coward's early theatrical success had begun to elude him. After the 1925 hit show On with the Dance he wrote four plays, of which Semi-Monde (1926) was never staged during his lifetime, This Was a Man (1926) was refused a licence by the official British censor and opened instead on Broadway, running for 31 performances, The Marquise (1927) managed a run of 129 performances, and Home Chat (1927) closed after 38 performances. In late 1927 a 1921 play of his, Sirocco, was premiered and failed conspicuously, with a fiasco on the first night followed by a run of 28 performances. Coward was under contract to write a revue for the impresario Charles B. Cochran, and in view of his own current poor box-office record he offered to release Cochran from the contract. Cochran declined; he told Coward he was quite sure that the revue would turn out to be triumphant and "one in the eye" for all his critics. Cochran was soon able to announce to the press, "What I have seen of this revue 'book' is some of the most brilliantly witty work Coward has ever done".

The revues of Cochran and others frequently included the year of production in their titles, and the new show was billed for its pre-London try-out in Manchester as Charles B. Cochran's 1928 Revue. Coward's secretary, Lorn Lorraine, suggested varying this formula with a title that drew on a traditional term for any particular year of the Christian era, (Note: The Oxford English Dictionary gives examples of its use going back to the fourteenth century, such as "The yere of grace a thousand" and "He began it in the Year of Grace 1670, and finish'd it in 1672".) and This Year of Grace! was adopted for the London opening.

== Productions ==
=== Britain ===
"Dance, Little Lady": Jessie Matthews with chorus in masks designed by Oliver Messel

The revue opened at the Palace Theatre, Manchester, running from 28 February to 17 March, and transferred to the London Pavilion in the West End on 22 March 1928, where it ran for 316 performances.

The large cast, headed by Sonnie Hale, Jessie Matthews, Tilly Losch and Maisie Gay, also included Douglas Byng, Joan Clarkson, Sheilah Graham, Fred Groves, Moya Nugent and Marjorie Robertson (later a star under the stage name Anna Neagle). The director was Frank Collins; Ernest Irving conducted, and the pianist was Leslie Hutchinson. Losch and Max Rivers arranged the dancing. The designers included Oliver Messel and Doris Zinkeisen.

Among the sketches was a guide to London theatre in which Coward made fun of his own recent theatrical disasters. Among the songs were two that became well known and were prominent in Coward's cabaret repertoire: "Dance, Little Lady" and "A Room With a View". The revue restored Coward's fortunes. His biographer Philip Hoare writes that it "earn[ed] Coward the immense sum of £1000 a week in royalties, (Note: £1,000 (equivalent to £54,316 in 2025)) and further income from sales in their thousands of the hit songs in sheet music and gramophone records".

=== US ===
Cochran decided to open the show in New York while it was still running in London. Coward recalled:

The idea was for me to rewrite certain of Sonnie Hale's material to suit my own talents and to co-star with Beatrice Lillie, who was to use the bulk of Maisie's numbers and sketches. There would, of course, have to be an entirely new cast, as Cockie [Cochran] wisely and resolutely refused to break up the London company, which was playing to capacity.

Produced by Cochran and Archie Selwyn, the Broadway production opened on 7 November 1928 at the Selwyn Theatre. Coward wrote that the show was unchanged except for the interpolation of two solo numbers for Lillie: "World Weary" and "I Can't Think" (an imitation of Gertrude Lawrence); and two duets for Coward and Lillie: "Lilac Time", a burlesque of opéra bouffe, and "Love, Life and Laughter", a sketch and song of Paris night life in the 1880s. These numbers replaced "Mad About You", "It Doesn't Matter how Old You Are", "Spanish Fantasy", and the Tilly Losch items "Gothic" and "Arabesque".

Coward, lacking recent practice as a dancer, took lessons, "necessary but painful", in preparation. He commented later, "I remember Jessie Matthews in tears over her dance for "A Room With a View" [in London] and my own tears over my own dance for the same number when I did it later in New York". After the New York production opened, three of the numbers used in it were introduced into the London production, including "World Weary", sung by Matthews.

The show ran in New York for 157 performances. Coward usually made it a rule not to play in any production for more than three months, but such was the demand for tickets that he was persuaded to remain for the whole run.

=== Subsequent productions ===
Maisie Gay led the cast in a tour of Australia in 1929, but thereafter, like most revues, This Year of Grace was not revived, although several of its numbers have been incorporated in later shows such as Cowardy Custard and Oh, Coward!. Coward included some, particularly "Dance, Little Lady" and "A Room With a View", but also "World Weary" and "Teach Me to Dance Like Grandma", in his later solo cabaret performances.

== Songs ==
Some songs were dropped and others introduced during the run. The following are in the text that Coward published in 1939:

Act I

- "Waiting in a Queue"
- "Mary Make Believe"
- "Mad About You"
- "Lorelei"
- "A Room With a View"
- "Teach Me to Dance Like Grandma"

Act II

- "Lido"
- "Little Women"
- "English Lido"
- "Mothers' Complaint"
- "Britannia Rules the Waves"

- "Dance, Little Lady"
- "Chauve Souris"
- "Try to Learn to Love"
- "It Doesn't Matter How Old You Are"
- "Finale"

Sheet music cover

=== Other numbers ===
- "Lilac Time" (introduced in London in September 1928; included in Broadway production)
- "Love, Life and Laughter (Paris 1890)" (originally from Charlot's Revue of 1924, introduced in the London run in October and included in the Broadway production).
- "Velasquez" (primarily dance number arranged by Losch. Not performed in London)
- "I Can't Think" (Broadway only)
- "World Weary" (New York and later London)
- "American Finale"

Source: Mander and Mitchenson.

The Noël Coward Society, drawing on performing statistics from the publishers and the Performing Rights Society, ranks "A Room With a View" as among Coward's ten most popular songs.

== Reception ==
The revue received enthusiastic notices. A dissenting voice was that of A. G. Macdonnell, author of England, Their England, who called the show "without exception, the dullest revue it has ever been my misfortune to see". But St John Ervine in The Observer was eloquent in praise of the piece:

I must be careful with my superlatives, so I will say only this, that This Year of Grace! is the most amusing, the most brilliant, the cleverest, the daintiest, the most exquisite, the most fanciful, the most graceful, the happiest, the most ironical, the jolliest, the most kaleidoscopic, the loveliest, the most magnificent, the neatest and nicest, the most opulent, the pithiest, the quickest, the richest, the most superb and tasteful, the most uberous, the most versatile, the wittiest ... if any person comes to me and says that there has ever, anywhere in the world, been a better revue than this, I shall publicly tweak his nose.

After the New York opening a critic wrote:

Probably not since Charlot's Revue was produced in this country several years ago, has New York had an opportunity to witness a show so cleverly created and played as was the case last night. Cochran, always a master producer, when aided by a man with the deft knowledge of the theatre, such as Noël Coward, has put together a most amusing entertainment of two hours, which is sure to keep the New York theatre-going public talking during the rest of the season.

== Notes, references and sources ==
=== Sources ===
- Castle, Charles (1972). Noël. London: W H Allen. ISBN 978-0-491-00534-0.
- Coward, Noël (1931). Collected Sketches and Lyrics. London: Hutchinson. OCLC 22370483.
- Coward, Noël (1950) [1939]. Play Parade II. London: Heinemann. OCLC 3372022.
- Coward, Noël (1965). The Lyrics of Noël Coward. London: Heinemann. OCLC 1574850.
- Coward, Noël (2004) [1932]. Present Indicative – Autobiography to 1931. London: Methuen. ISBN 978-0-413-77413-2.
- Day, Barry, ed. (2007). The Letters of Noël Coward. London: Methuen. ISBN 978-1-4081-0675-4.* Coward, Noël (2004) [1932]. Present Indicative – Autobiography to 1931. London: Methuen. ISBN 978-0-413-77413-2.
- Hoare, Philip (1995). Noël Coward, A Biography. London: Sinclair-Stevenson. ISBN 978-1-4081-0675-4.
- Lesley, Cole (1976). The Life of Noël Coward. London: Cape. ISBN 978-0-224-01288-1.
- Mander, Raymond; Mitchenson, Joe; Day, Barry; Morley, Sheridan (2000) [1957]. Theatrical Companion to Coward (second ed.). London: Oberon. ISBN 978-1-84002-054-0.
- Morley, Sheridan (1974) [1969]. A Talent to Amuse. London: Penguin. ISBN 978-0-14-003863-7.
- Payn, Graham (1994). My Life with Noël Coward. New York: Applause Books. ISBN 978-1-55783-190-3.
- Richards, Dick, ed. (1970). The Wit of Noël Coward. London: Sphere Books. ISBN 978-0-7221-3676-8.
- Soden, Oliver (2023). Masquerade: The Lives of Noel Coward. London: Weidenfeld and Nicolson. ISBN 978-1-47-461281-4.
