= The Night Is Young =

1935 film by Dudley Murphy

- Directed by: Dudley Murphy
- Screenplay by: Edgar Allan Woolf; Franz Schulz
- Based on: From the story by Vicki Baum
- Produced by: Harry Rapf
- Starring: Ramon Novarro; Evelyn Laye
- Cinematography: James Wong Howe
- Edited by: Conrad A. Nervig
- Music by: Sigmund Romberg (uncredited)
- Production company: Metro-Goldwyn-Mayer
- Distributed by: Metro-Goldwyn-Mayer
- Release date: January 11, 1935
- Running time: 81 minutes
- Country: United States
- Language: English

The Night Is Young is a 1935 American romantic musical film starring Ramon Novarro and Evelyn Laye. The film is based on a story written by Vicki Baum and directed by Dudley Murphy.

== Plot ==
Upon learning that the Venetian archduke, Paul Gustave will attend her next performance, ballerina Fanni immediately plans to court the wealthy bachelor Willy Fitch, her sweetheart. Fanni assures her friend and fellow dancer Lisl Gluck that her pursuit will be conducted in the name of "patriotism." Lisl advises her to stick with Willy, a carriage driver. However, Paul becomes interested in Lisl instead. Paul, who is expected to marry Countess Rayay, is informed that the marriage must be delayed for six months due to state reasons. Seizing the opportunity, Paul decides to keep Lisl Lisl as his secret lover. Meanwhile, Lisl, engaged to a struggling ballet producer, is invited to a dinner at Paul's villa by his valet, Szereny. Despite her initial rejection, the valet insists she must accept. Upon learning that the archduke has chosen her friend over her, Fanny informs Willy that she is now available for marriage. However, Willy shows little interest in marriage and instead sings a song praising his horse "Mitz" over his future bride.

When Lisl arrives at the archduke's palace, she is subjected to a rigorous physical inspection by Szereny to ensure that she meets Paul's requirements, an examination that she finds offensive and degrading. When she finally meets Paul, he is less than amorous and immediately tells her that his relationship with her will have nothing to do with love, and that she will be expected to live in special quarters in the house and not disturb him. Paul is surprised, however, to learn that Lisl is not interested in making love to him either. Later, when Paul spends an evening out with the Countess Rafay, the lonely Lisl invites Toni and Willy to visit her. Upon his return, the ill-tempered archduke prepares to admonish her for conducting such merriment in his home but softens when he hears her sing. A romance between Paul and Lisl soon blooms when the two are stranded on a carnival Ferris wheel and are forced to spend the night together. The next day, the lovers are visited by the jealous Toni, who accuses Lisl of walking out on their planned marriage. However, Toni immediately permits Lisl to resume her romance with Paul when he learns that the archduke intends to finance his ballet. Though Paul is willing to sacrifice his title in order to get out of his arranged marriage to Countess Rafay and marry Lisl, the emperor insists that the arranged marriage take place. When Paul informs Lisl that he must leave her, Szereny consoles the devastated Lisl, and following a tearful farewell dinner, Paul asks Lisl to kiss him and then turn around and never look back.

== Cast ==
- Ramon Novarro as Archduke Paul 'Gustl' Gustave
- Evelyn Laye as Elizabeth Katherine Anne 'Lisl' Gluck
- Charles Butterworth as Willy Fitch
- Una Merkel as Fanni Kerner
- Edward Everett Horton as Baron Szereny
- Donald Cook as Toni Berngruber
- Henry Stephenson as Emperor Franz Josef
- Rosalind Russell as Countess Zarika Rafay
- Herman Bing as Nepomuk
- Gustav von Seyffertitz as Ambassador (uncredited)

== Reception ==
Andre Sennwald in The New York Times wrote, "According to the current standards of costumed musical romances, "The Night Is Young" is invincibly correct".
