= Beatrice Lillie =

Canadian-British actress and comedian (1894–1989)

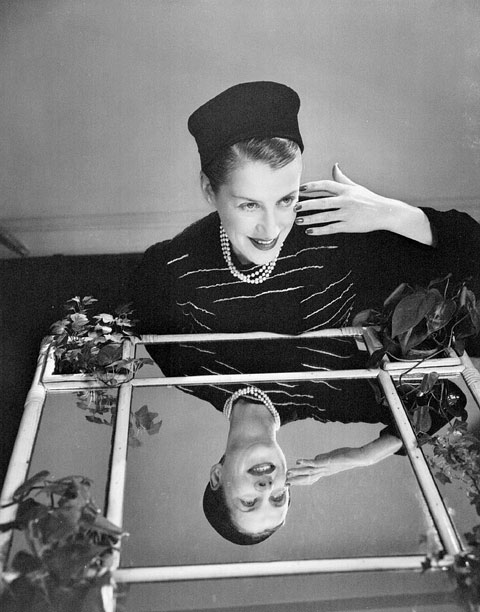
- Lillie, photographed by Yousuf Karsh, 1948
- Born: 29 May 1894; Toronto, Ontario, Canada
- Died: 20 January 1989 (aged 94); Henley-on-Thames, Oxfordshire, England
- Occupations: Actress, singer and comedian
- Spouse: Sir Robert Peel, 5th Baronet (m. 1920; died 1934)
- Children: Sir Robert Peel, 6th Baronet

Beatrice Gladys Lillie, Lady Peel (29 May 1894 – 20 January 1989) was a Canadian-born British actress, singer and comedy performer.

She began to perform as a child with her mother and sister. She made her West End début in 1914 and soon gained notice in revues and light comedies. She first appeared in New York in 1924 and two years later starred in her first film, continuing to perform in both the US and UK. In her early career in André Charlot's revues she appeared with other rising stars such as Jack Buchanan, Gertrude Lawrence and Noël Coward. Coward and Cole Porter were among the many songwriters to write with her in mind. She premiered Coward's "Mad Dogs and Englishmen" and "I Went to a Marvellous Party", and her last stage appearances were in High Spirits (1964) directed by him.

Lillie married into the English upper class, becoming Lady Peel from 1925 to the end of her life. During the Second World War, she was an assiduous entertainer of the troops in Britain, the Mediterranean, Africa and the Middle East. Essentially a live performer, she made few films although her last, Thoroughly Modern Millie (1967), won her praise.

== Life and career ==
=== Early years ===
Lillie was born in Toronto on 29 May 1894 (Note: Like many performers of her generation, Lillie was given to deducting a few years from her acknowledged age, and gave her year of birth as 1898 in Who's Who in the Theatre in succeeding editions across fifty years.) the younger daughter of John Lillie, cigar seller, of Lisburn in Ireland, and his wife, Lucie Ann, eldest daughter of John Shaw, a Manchester draper. (Note: Some theatre sources, e.g. The Oxford Companion to the American Musical, incorrectly state her birth name as Constance Sylvia Gladys Munston, but the birth of Beatrice Gladys Lillie on 29 May 1894 to John Lillie and Lucy Ann Shaw is recorded in the database of Ontario Births, 1869–1911 (see e.g. https://familysearch.org/ark:/61903/1:1:FMW4-3HW)) Lillie attended Loretto Academy in Toronto and St Agnes' College in Belleville, Ontario. She had an elder sister, Muriel, at one time an aspiring concert pianist who later played the piano at silent movie houses. Mother and daughters performed in amateur concerts, billed as the Lillie Trio. John Lillie ran the family home in Toronto as a boarding house in their absence.

Shortly before the First World War their mother took the girls to England, where Beatrice made her professional stage début at the Chatham Music Hall in 1914 and her West End début the same year in The Daring of Diane, a musical comedy composed by Heinrich Reinhardt, at the London Pavilion. She first appeared in revue in October 1914 in André Charlot's Not Likely! at the Alhambra Theatre. According to the biographer Sheridan Morley, Charlot saw in her "not the serious singer she had set out to become, but a comedian of considerable if zany qualities". A series of Charlot revues followed, in each of which she attracted more attention: 5064 Gerrard (1915), Now's the Time (1915), Samples (1916), Some (1916), Cheep! (1917) and Tabs (1918).

=== Rising star ===
In Cheep!, 1917

In Oh, Joy!, with Billy Leonard, 1919

During the war Lillie became a favourite of troops on leave from the front. She became known for her spontaneity and improvised response to her audiences. Morley comments that her great talents were "the arched eyebrow, the curled lip, the fluttering eyelid, the tilted chin, the ability to suggest, even in apparently innocent material, the possible double entendre". Noël Coward, another of the impresario's protégés, said that Charlot's 1917 revue Cheep! was the first time Lillie appeared "in her true colours as a comic genius of the first order". On tour in 1918 and in the West End in 1919 Lillie appeared as Jackie Sampson in Oh, Joy! – her first starring role in a "book" musical – with music by Jerome Kern and words by Guy Bolton and P. G. Wodehouse. (Note: Wodehouse did not share Coward's laudatory opinion of her; he wrote: "Beatrice Lillie, to avoid seeing whom I would run several miles".)

On 5 January 1920, at St Paul's Church, Drayton Bassett, Staffordshire, Lillie married Robert Peel, great-grandson of the Victorian prime minister Sir Robert Peel, and heir of Sir Robert Peel, 4th Baronet. The actress Phyllis Monkman described him as "a sweet boy; very, very good looking [but] weak as water". There was little family money and according to one biographer, Peel "had little else to offer besides the title of 5th baronet". The couple honeymooned in Monte Carlo, where Peel lost all their money at the gambling table. What his wife called his "champagne tastes" left the couple dependent on Lillie's income from the theatre throughout their marriage.

Shortly after the honeymoon the couple visited the US. Lillie received numerous offers of engagements, not least from Florenz Ziegfeld, but she turned them down, announcing that she was pregnant. They returned to England and in December 1920 Lillie gave birth to a son – another Robert. She found domestic life boring and soon returned to the theatre. In the words of the biographer Norman Powers, "Placing her son's upbringing in her mother's care and accepting her relationship with Peel as a marriage in name only, Lillie returned to the stage". (Note: The couple lived separate lives but did not divorce, remaining married until Peel died in 1934.) She co-starred with Charles Hawtrey in Up in Mabel's Room, billed as "A frivolous farce in feminine foibles", in April 1921.

=== Broadway and West End ===
In The Nine O'Clock Revue, 1922

Lillie returned to revue at the Vaudeville Theatre in Now and Then (October 1921) and Pot Luck (December 1921). In 1922 she was in two more revues: A to Z at the Prince of Wales Theatre, and The Nine O'Clock Revue at the Little Theatre, for which her sister wrote the music and which ran for more than a year.

Lillie travelled for a second time to New York, making her first stage appearance there in Charlot's Revue of 1924 at the Times Square Theatre in January 1924. This was a compilation of numbers and sketches, mainly by Coward, from Charlot's West End shows. It took New York by storm – The Daily News reported, "The Charlot Revue sets crowd cheering" – and established Lillie and her co-stars, Jack Buchanan, Gertrude Lawrence and Jessie Matthews, on the New York stage. The New York Times reviewer wrote, "There is no one in New York quite comparable to Beatrice Lillie. In appearance she is an exaggerated Lynn Fontanne, and it is in burlesque that she shines. The opening of the second act found her as a fifty-year-old soubrette, still bent upon singing the giddy ballads of her youth. And in 'March With Me', a bit of patriotism near the finish, she rose to superb heights".

When Peel's father died in 1925, the baronetcy passed to his son, making Lillie Lady Peel. The title amused her, and she was in the habit of answering the telephone, "C'est Lady Peel qui parle". In 1926 Lillie made her first appearance in cabaret, at Charlot's Rendezvous Club in New York, and the following year she made her film début in MGM's Exit Smiling. During the late 1920s and throughout the 1930s she divided her time between the West End and Broadway. In New York in 1928 she co-starred with Coward in his revue This Year of Grace. In the same year she made her music hall début, at the London Palladium in Coward's sketch "After Dinner Music". In The Third Little Show on Broadway in 1931 she gave the first performances of his song "Mad Dogs and Englishmen". In 1932 she made a rare appearance in a role in a straight play: Sweetie, the nurse, in Shaw's Too True to Be Good at the Guild Theatre, in a cast that included Claude Rains, Ernest Cossart, Leo G. Carroll and Hugh Sinclair.

Lillie made her London cabaret début at the Café de Paris in 1933. In Vincente Minnelli's At Home Abroad (Broadway, 1935) she performed Dion Titheradge's tongue-twisting sketch "Double Damask", written for Cicely Courtneidge in the West End show Clowns in Clover in 1928. It remained a popular item in both actresses' repertoires. Lillie performed it in the 1938 film Doctor Rhythm. In January 1939 she starred in another Coward revue, Set to Music, in which she introduced his song "I Went to a Marvellous Party". In The New York Times Brooks Atkinson wrote, "Although Miss Lillie has been synonymous with perfection in comedy for quite a long time, an old admirer may be forgiven for believing that she also is more incandescently witty now than before".

Lillie made recordings of songs from early in her career; she can be heard on some cast albums from her shows and compilations.

=== Second World War ===
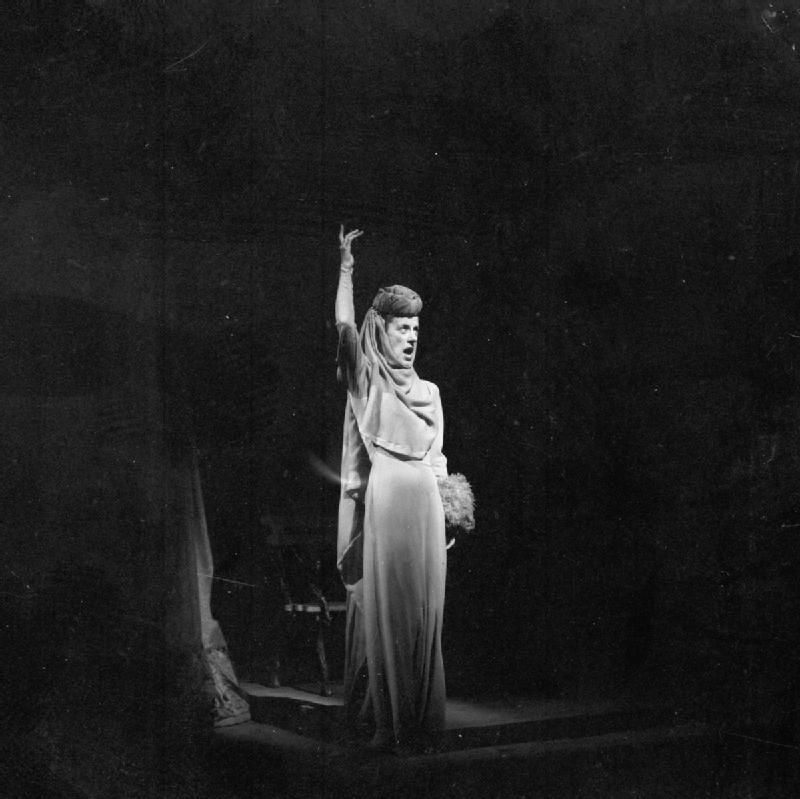
Performing her song "Wind Round My Heart" at a wartime troop concert

Lillie began touring to entertain the troops within a month of the declaration of the Second World War, travelling to Scapa Flow in a remote part of Scotland to perform for members of the Royal Navy. She joined an ENSA national tour in 1940, co-starring with Vic Oliver in a programme of short plays and songs by Coward and others. During this tour Lillie joined John Gielgud for a charity matinée of Coward's Hands Across the Sea at the Globe Theatre – now the Gielgud Theatre.

In Manchester in April 1942, just before the opening of Charles B. Cochran's revue Big Top, she learned that her son, who had joined the Navy, was missing in action, presumed dead. Morley comments that this bereavement left Lillie with "a constant private sadness that she seemed able to overcome only on stage". She continued to appear in the show, and later in the year she resumed travelling to entertain the troops, visiting the Mediterranean, Africa and the Middle East until 1944, when she became unwell and withdrew.

Lillie travelled to New York in December 1944 and co-starred with Bert Lahr in Billy Rose's revue Seven Lively Arts. In The Daily News, John Chapman wrote:

The reception Miss Lillie received at her first appearance is something she will never forget, and I won't either. The handclaps and the cheers spoke everything – admiration for a superb comedienne, affection for an old and dear friend and a glowing, enthusiastic welcome home.

=== Post-war and later years ===
Lillie devised An Evening with Beatrice Lillie in 1952. She toured the American summer theatres before opening in New York in October. It ran there for nearly a year, after which she toured it through the US. It was one of only eight musicals that opened on Broadway between 1943 and 1964 to "unanimous raves from the major first-night newspaper critics". She had earlier met a younger actor, John Philip Huck, whose stage name was John Philip. He gradually became part of her life and she came to rely on him more and more. When Lillie returned to England in 1954 to present her show, she took Philip with her and they remained together for the rest of their lives. Coward described him as Lillie's "pet swain" and "a crashing bore and a bloody nuisance".

In October 1954 Lillie opened An Evening with Beatrice Lillie at the Royal Court Theatre in Liverpool and brought it into the Globe in London the following month, after which she toured in Britain until September 1955. The following January she took the show to Miami and Palm Beach in Florida. She starred in Ziegfeld Follies of 1957 and in 1958 she took over the title role in Auntie Mame from Rosalind Russell on Broadway and then played the role in the West End, where the piece ran for more than a year.

In 1964 Lillie had her last stage role, Madame Arcati in High Spirits, a musical version of Coward's Blithe Spirit. Rehearsals, directed by Coward, were fraught because by this stage Lillie had great difficulty in remembering her lines, but by the opening night in New York she was in command of the piece. Coward noted in his diary:

Beattie came on with a star mixture of assurance and humility, took the audience by the scruff of its neck and shook it into a state of adoring frenzy. ... Beattie, with all her fluffy-mindedness and lack of any acting technique whatever, is unquestionably a great star and has that indestructible capacity for making the audience love her. Her beguiling smile and her, at moments, incredible funniness are magical and, so far as the public is concerned, it doesn't matter how many lines she forgets and how many mistakes she makes. She is adored.

In 1967 Lillie made one of her rare film appearances, playing Mrs Meers in Thoroughly Modern Millie. The Times commented that the film was redeemed from tedium "by the splendidly unpredictable presence of Beatrice Lillie as a sorely-tried white-slaver constantly thwarted in her attempts".

Lillie published an autobiography, Every Other Inch a Lady, in 1972. She suffered a stroke in the mid-1970s, and in 1977 a conservator was appointed over her property; her medical bills were nearly double her annual income. She retired to her eighteenth-century house at Henley-on-Thames, under the care of Philip. She became a virtual recluse and died on 20 January 1989 at the age of 94. Philip died of a heart attack the following day and they were buried side by side.

== Stage appearances ==
- Not Likely (1914) (London)
- 5064 Gerrard (1915) (London)
- Samples (1916) (London)
- Some (1916) (London)
- Cheep (1917) (London)
- Tabs (1918) (London)
- Bran Pie (1919) (London)
- Oh, Joy! (1919) (London)
- Up in Mabel's Room (1921) (London)
- Now and Then (1921) (London)
- Pot Luck (1921) (London)
- A to Z (1922) (London)
- The Nine O'Clock Revue (1922) (London)
- Andre Charlot's Revue of 1924 (1924) (Broadway)
- Andre Charlot's Revue of 1926 (1925) (Broadway and US tour)
- Oh, Please! (1926) (Broadway)
- She's My Baby (1928) (Broadway)
- This Year of Grace (1928) (Broadway)
- Charlot's Masquerade (1930) (London)
- The Third Little Show (1931) (Broadway)
- Too True to Be Good (1932) (Broadway)
- Walk a Little Faster (1932) (Broadway)
- Please (1933) (London)
- At Home Abroad (1935) (Broadway)
- The Show Is On (1936) (Broadway)
- Happy Returns (1938) (London)
- Set to Music (1939) (Broadway)
- All Clear (1939) (London)
- Big Top (1942) (London)
- Seven Lively Arts (1944) (Broadway)
- Better Late (1946) (London)
- Inside U.S.A. (1948) (Broadway)
- An Evening with Beatrice Lillie (1952) (Broadway and London)
- Ziegfeld Follies of 1957 (1957) (Broadway)
- Auntie Mame (1958) (Broadway and London)
- A Late Evening with Beatrice Lillie (1960) (Edinburgh Festival)
- High Spirits (1964) (Broadway)

Source: Who's Who in the Theatre.

== Notes, references and sources ==
=== Sources ===
- Coward, Noël (1982). Graham Payn; Sheridan Morley (eds.). The Noël Coward Diaries (1941–1969). London: Methuen. ISBN 978-0-297-78142-4.
- Herbert, Ian, ed. (1972). Who's Who in the Theatre (fifteenth ed.). London: Sir Isaac Pitman and Sons. ISBN 978-0-273-31528-5.
- Hischak, Thomas (2008). The Oxford Companion to the American Musical. New York: Oxford University Press. ISBN 978-0-19-989147-4.
- Laffey, Bruce (1990). Beatrice Lillie: The Funniest Woman in the World. London: Robson Books. ISBN 978-0922066223.
- Lillie, Beatrice; James Brough (1972). Every Other Inch a Lady. London: W. H. Allen. ISBN 0-49-100683-7.
- Mander, Raymond; Joe Mitchenson (1971). Revue: A Story in Pictures. London: Peter Davies. ISBN 978-0-43-209076-3.
- Mander, Raymond; Joe Mitchenson; Barry Day; Sheridan Morley (2000) [1957]. Theatrical Companion to Coward (second ed.). London: Oberon Books. ISBN 978-1-84002-054-0.
- Morley, Sheridan (1986). The Great Stage Stars. London: Angus & Robertson. ISBN 0-8160-1401-9.
- Parker, John, ed. (1922). Who's Who in the Theatre (fourth ed.). London: Sir Isaac Pitman and Sons. OCLC 10013276.
- Parker, John, ed. (1925). Who's Who in the Theatre (fifth ed.). London: Sir Isaac Pitman and Sons. OCLC 10013159.
- Powers, Norman (2001). "Lillie, Beatrice". In Anne Commire (ed.). Women In World History: A Biographical Encyclopedia, Volume 9. Waterford, CT: Yorkin. ISBN 0-7876-4068-9.
- Sherrin, Ned (1984). Cutting Edge, Or, "Back in the Knife Box, Miss Sharp". London: J. M. Dent. ISBN 978-0-460-04594-0.
- Wodehouse, P. G. (2013). Sophie Ratcliffe (ed.). P. G. Wodehouse: A Life in Letters. London: Arrow. ISBN 978-0-09-951479-4.

Awards and achievements
Preceded by Helen Hayes	Sarah Siddons Award (Sarah Siddons Society, Chicago); 1954	Succeeded by Deborah Kerr
