= Blue Eyes (musical) =

1928 musical by Jerome Kern

Blue Eyes is a musical composed by Jerome Kern, with a book and lyrics by Guy Bolton and Graham John. Orchestrations were by Robert Russell Bennett, and the original producer was Lee Ephraim. The musical was a historical comedy and romance set against the backdrop of Jacobite Charles Edward Stuart's attempts to restore the House of Stuart to the British throne. In the plot of Blue Eyes a London actress disguises herself as a soldier to help her brother who has been imprisoned by the Duke of Cumberland in the aftermath of the Battle of Culloden. It starred Evelyn Laye, and comic relief was provided by W. H. Berry, who "disguised himself as a silly Scotsman, a flea circus owner [and a] French dancing teacher".

It was the first production at London's new Piccadilly Theatre, opening on 27 April 1928, and transferred to Daly's Theatre in July, before finishing its run of eight months, for a total of 327 performances.

The cast recording with the Piccadilly Theatre Orchestra was issued by Columbia Records.

The musicologist Thomas Hischak described Kern's score for Blue Eyes as featuring some "entrancing songs", particularly praising "Back to the Heather", "Charlie Is the Darling of My Heart", and the comic song "In Vodeodo". Hischak felt that the score was closer to that of an operetta than a musical comedy. The song "Do I Do Wrong" was cut from the production before the musical opened. The melody was later used for Kern's "You're Devastating" from his 1933 musical Roberta.

== 1928 London cast ==
- Evelyn Laye as Nancy Anne Bellamy
- George Vollaire as Jamie
- Bertram Wallis as the Duke of Cumberland
- Geoffrey Gwyther as Sir George
- Sylvia Cecil as Flora Campbell
- W. H. Berry as Pilbeam

== Songs ==
- "Back to the Heather"
- "Blue Eyes"
- "Bow Belles"
- "Charlie Is the Darling of My Heart"
- "The Curtsey"
- "Fair Lady"
- "The Good King James"
- "Henry"
- "His Majesty's Dragoons"
- "In Love"
- "In Vodeodo"
- "Long Live Nancy"
- "No One Else But You"
- "Praise the Day"
- "Prince Do and Dare"
- "Romeo and Juliet"
- "Someone"
- "Trouble About the Drama"

Songs as listed in Stephen Suskin's Show Tunes : The songs, shows, and careers of Broadway's major composers (2010)
