= Joan Clarkson =

British actress (1904–1982)

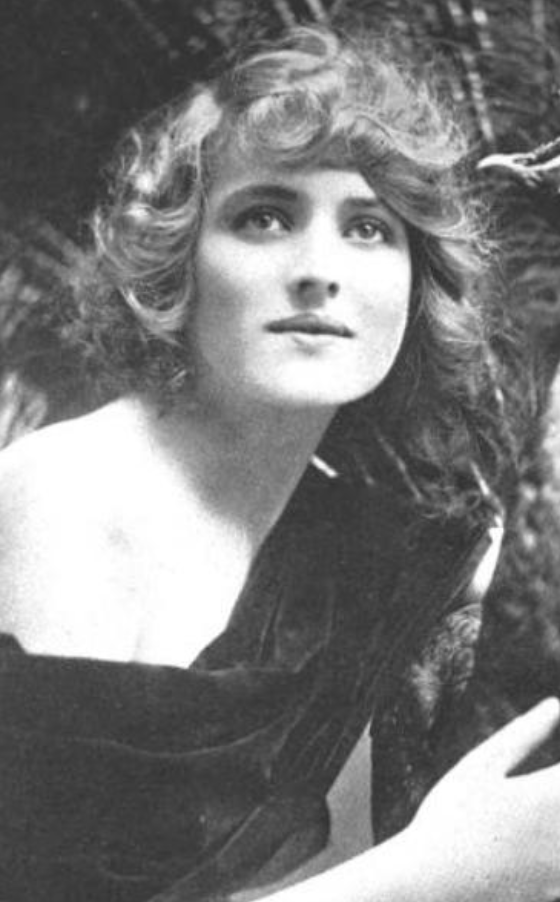
- Joan Clarkson, from a 1919 publication
- Born: 14 March 1904; London, England, United Kingdom
- Died: 19 June 1982 (aged 78); London, England, United Kingdom
- Occupation: Actress
- Notable work: The Mystery of Fu Manchu (1923)

Joan Rosaline Clarkson (14 March 1904 – 19 June 1982) was an English actress who was most active in the 1920s and 1930s.

== Early life ==
Clarkson was born in Tottenham, London, the daughter of Frederick William Clarkson and Ellen Theresa Clarkson.

== Career ==
Clarkson was an actress associated with English theatre producer Charles B. Cochran, who called her his "English rose". She was known for her long blonde hair, and her contract with Cochran required her to surrender half her salary if she cut her hair in a bob. Her stage credits included roles in Cyrano de Bergerac (1919), The Little Whopper (1920), An Old-Fashioned Girl (1922) Fun of the Fayre (1922), The Happy Ending (1922), John Galsworthy's Havoc (1924), Cochran's 1930 Revue (1930), Noël Coward's revue sketches A Tube Station, Ignorance is Bliss,The English Lido, and Rules of Three (all 1928), and Sunshine Sisters (1933).

On film, Clarkson was best known for her appearances as Karamaneh in The Mystery of Dr. Fu-Manchu, a 1923 series of more than a dozen short silent films, based on the 1913 novel and starring Harry Agar Lyons. Dorinea Shirley also played the Karamaneh in some later installments. Philip de László painted a portrait of her in a white dress in 1935.

== Personal life ==
Clarkson married producer William Mollison in 1928; she left him in 1935, and they divorced in 1939. She died in 1982, aged 78 years, in London.
