= Douglas Byng =

English comic singer and songwriter (1893–1987)

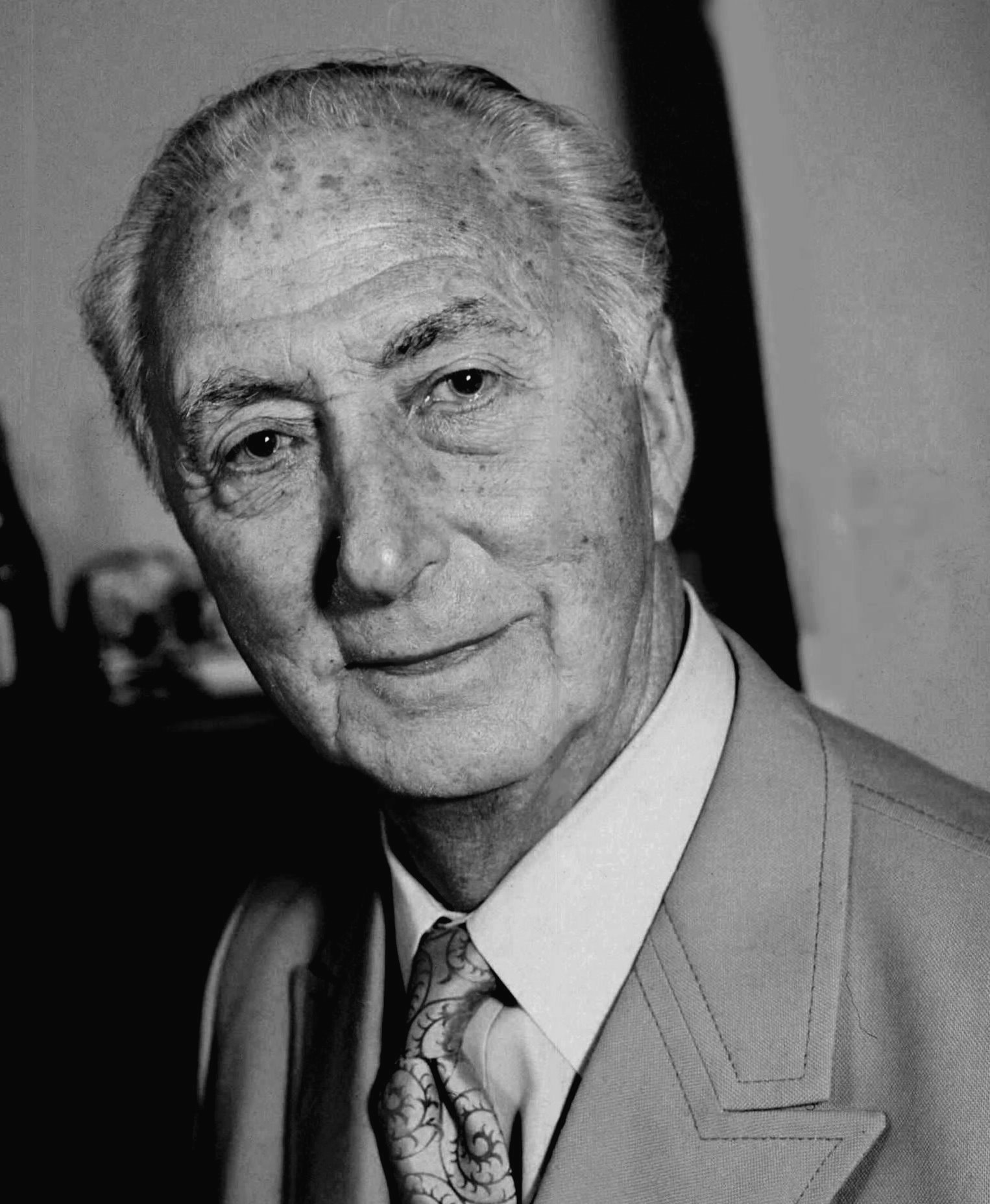
Byng in 1973

Douglas Coy Byng (17 March 1893 – 24 August 1987) was an English comic singer and songwriter in West End theatre, revue and cabaret. Billed as "Bawdy but British", Byng was known for his female impersonations. His songs are full of sexual innuendo and double entendres. Due to the prejudices of the law and of the public at that time, Byng was a closeted gay performer. He was known for his camp performances in the music halls and in cabaret. Byng made a large number of recordings, many of which have been transferred to CD. Byng was also a pantomime dame and appeared in over 30 pantomimes.

== Early life ==
Byng was born on 17 March 1893 in Basford, Nottinghamshire. His father was a bank manager and his mother (whose maiden name was Coy) was a former school teacher. They did not encourage his early theatrical leanings, and when he was ten, they sent him to live in Germany with his elder brother, who owned a lace factory there. Byng studied music and German, but following the trade of his brother he concentrated on fashion. After his return to Britain, he worked for the costume designer Charles Alias in London.

In 1914 Byng answered an advertisement for a light comedian for a seaside concert party and made his first appearance on stage at Hastings. At the age of 21, playing a middle-aged diplomat, he toured more than a hundred towns in the musical comedy The Girl in the Taxi. He continued his theatre work throughout the war, playing character parts in touring comedies and eventually achieving a juvenile lead in 1920.

== Between the wars ==
In the 1920s he took to pantomime, playing the Grand Vizier in Aladdin at the London Palladium in 1921, and in 1924 creating the first of his many pantomime dames as Eliza in Dick Whittington and His Cat at the New Theatre Oxford. In 1925 Byng appeared at the London Pavilion in C. B. Cochran's revue On with the Dance, written by Noël Coward. Byng remained with Cochran for five years in a succession of revues. During this period he opened his own nightclub, The Kinde Dragon, off St Martin's Lane in central London, where he first performed the cabaret drag songs for which he is best remembered, described by the critic Sheridan Morley as "a curious mixture of sophistication, schoolboy humour and double entendre." An example is his Mexican Minnie:

Come where the heat from the sun's burning rays
Gets you so gaga you tear off your stays!
I'm Mexican Minnie, all jolly and ginny
I loll in the mountains all day.
Though I'm well off the map, I'm just covered in slap,
Luring brigands to come and play ha'penny nap.
But they get very reckless, and will stay to breakfast
Then go off refusing to pay.
I say, "Well you can go,
"I'm sick of the gang, so
"You shan't see my tango today!"

Byng's skill in performance was said to vanquish prudery, but in reality his material was never crude. His famous numbers included: "Sex Appeal Sarah", "Milly the Messy Old Mermaid" and "The Lass who Leaned against the Tower of Pisa". His "Doris, the Goddess of Wind" was revived in Alan Bennett's 2010 play The Habit of Art. He continually tested the patience of the BBC in debating which of his double entendres he would be allowed to speak or sing. He claimed that the rudest joke that he was allowed – because it was not understood – was one in which Nell Gwynne said to King Charles, who enjoyed dancing: "If you must dance, stick the maypole up yourself and dance around it."

In 1931 Byng appeared in cabaret at the Club Lido, in New York, and had a great success. He pursued his career of revue, cabaret and pantomime in London throughout the 1930s, and was the first cabaret artiste to have his name in neon lights in the West End. By the 1930s, Byng's recordings of songs like "I'm Millie, a Messy Old Mermaid", sold well. In the Cole Porter revue Hi Diddle Diddle (1934), he was also the first to sing the celebrated song "Miss Otis Regrets". In 1938 he played his favourite role in a musical, Prince Zorpan, in an adaptation of Emmerich Kálmán's Maritza. Byng wrote all his own words for the piece and also some extra music. In one scene he impersonated a lady violinist, singing "I'm the pest of Budapest that turned the Danube so blue" in which The Times said he shone intensely.

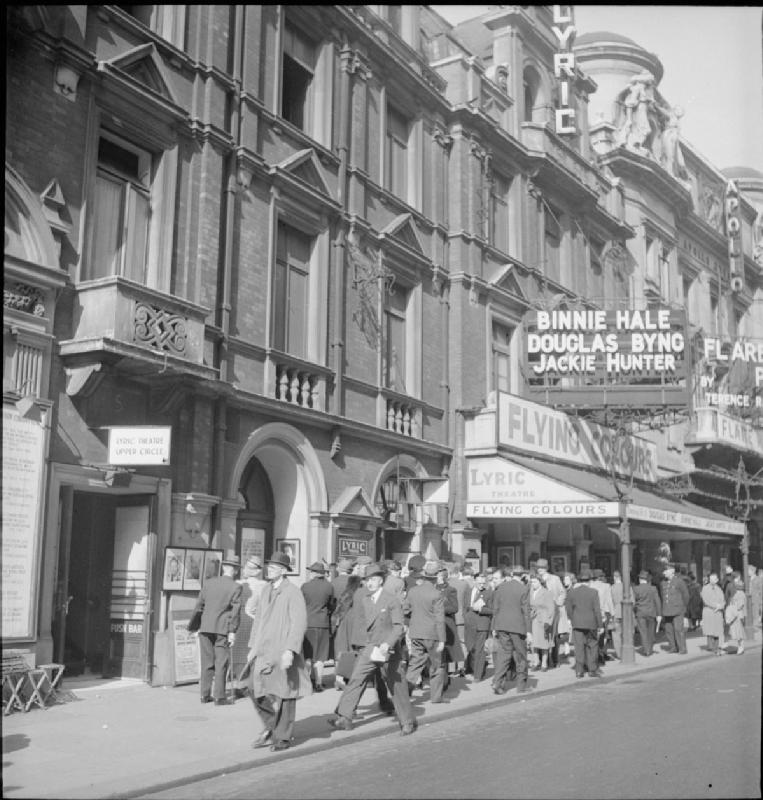
August 1943: "Actor Douglas Byng (centre, just stepping onto the pavement) arrives for work at the Lyric Theatre, where he is starring in 'Flying Colours' with Binnie Hale and Jackie Hunter."

During the Second World War, Byng was busy in musicals and variety, as well as cabaret and entertaining the troops. Afterwards he appeared in more comedies and farces, the best remembered being Georges Feydeau's Hotel Paradiso in 1956 with Alec Guinness at the Winter Garden Theatre in London, reprised in a 1966 film version in which he also appeared. He also turned up sporadically on television, notably in Alan Melville's series Before the Fringe in the 1960s when he sang, or rather recited, some of the old revue songs.

== Later years ==
Byng never really retired from the stage and was working in his late eighties. His career was revived when he made a guest appearance on the BBC's Parkinson show in 1977 with Carol Channing.

In the last years of his life he briefly teamed up with another veteran variety artiste, Billy Milton, in the touring revue Those Thirties Memories, directed by Patrick Newley. He made his last appearance in 1987 in a one-man show at the National Theatre in London at the age of 93. He also wrote an autobiography, As You Were (1970). He features prominently in Patrick Newley's autobiographical memoir The Krays and Bette Davis (2005).

Byng finally moved to Denville Hall, the Actors' Charitable Trust home in Northwood, Middlesex, England. He composed his own epitaph:

So here you are, old Douglas, a derelict at last.
Before your eyes what visions rise of your vermilion past.
Mad revelry beneath the stars, hot clasping by the lake.
You need not sigh, you can't deny, you've had your bit of cake.

He died on 24 August 1987 aged 94. His ashes were scattered outside his former home in Arundel Terrace, Brighton. A Brighton bus is named after him.
