= On with the Dance (musical) =

Leonid Massine (kneeling) in the Rake's Progress ballet from On with the Dance

On with the Dance is a 1925 musical revue produced by C. B. Cochran, with sketches by Noël Coward, songs by Coward and Philip Braham and ballet numbers, one of which was composed by Roger Quilter and choreographed by Leonid Massine. It starred Alice Delysia, and Massine, who danced in two of four dance sequences. The show ran in the West End of London for 229 performances.

== Background ==
Noël Coward wrote songs and sketches for On with the Dance while he was acting in his first stage hit, The Vortex. 1925 was a busy year for Coward: two of his plays were premiered in London – Hay Fever, Fallen Angels – and one in New York – Easy Virtue. The producer, C. B. Cochran, had originally intended that Philip Braham should write all the songs and Coward only the sketches, but according to Cochran, Coward "contrived his sketches in such a way that they evolved quite naturally towards a musical finish. When the revue was completed, it was discovered – to everyone's embarrassment but his own – that the majority of the words and music were Noel's".

== Productions ==
Alice Delysia and Hermione Baddeley in "Poor Little Rich Girl"

Ernest Thesiger and Douglas Byng en travesti in the sketch "Oranges and Lemons"

The show, directed by Frank Collins, opened on 17 March 1925 at the Palace Theatre, Manchester, and transferred to the London Pavilion, where it opened on 30 April and closed on 14 November, after 229 performances. As well as the star, Alice Delysia, the cast included Hermione Baddeley, Ernest Thesiger, Nigel Bruce and Douglas Byng. On opening night, Coward was not yet the famous name he would be by the end of the year: The Manchester Guardian review mentioned him only once, and The Times review did not mention him at all.

The best-known song from the show is Coward's "Poor Little Rich Girl", sung by Delysia as a French maid, warning her English employer (Baddeley) of the perils of life as a debauched bright young thing. Cochran disliked the song and during rehearsals he proposed to cut it, but was dissuaded by Coward and Delysia. It became, in the words of Coward's biographer Philip Hoare "Coward’s first hit, an anthem for the world-weary 1920s". In addition to the songs and Coward's sketches On with the Dance features four ballets, not by Coward or Braham. One of them, based on William Hogarth's The Rake’s Progress, was composed by Roger Quilter and choreographed by Leonid Massine.

A second edition of the revue, called Still Dancing, ran from 19 November 1925 to 27 February 1926, also with Delysia, Bruce, Thesinger and Baddeley, and again choreographed by Massine, receiving warm reviews. The ballets remained from the original show but none of Coward's material was retained; the book was by Arthur Wimperis and Ronald Jeans, with lyrics by Philip Braham, Noble Sissle and Eubie Blake, and music by Ivor Novello, Irving Berlin, Vivian Ellis and Isham Jones.

== Songs ==
=== By Coward ===
- Cosmopolitan lady
- I'm so in love
- Poor little rich girl
- First love
- Raspberry time in Runcorn

=== By Braham ===
- Couldn't we keep on dancing?
- Come a little closer

=== By Coward and Braham ===
- Spinsters' quartet
- The vicarage dance
- Choirboys' song
- Even clergymen are naughty now and then
- Church parade

Source: Mander and Mitchenson.

The Noël Coward Society, drawing on performing statistics from the publishers and the Performing Rights Society, ranks "Poor little rich girl" among Coward's ten most popular songs.

== Sketches ==
The following sketches from the revue are included in Coward's Collected Sketches and Lyrics (1931):

- "Travelling Light" (written 1924)

A young man and a young woman meet on the Orient Express. She takes advantage of his gallantry and robs him while he sleeps.

- "First Love" (written 1924)

Two disagreeable children squabble over their French homework.

- "The Café de la Paix" (written 1925)

An American family on a European tour conclude that as the day is Thursday they must be in Paris. They are followed by a party of blasé English people who are in their way equally ridiculous.

- "Class" (written 1924)

A working-class family in "an extremely squalid room in the East End" converse in faultless upper-class speech. In the following scene an upper-class family in a grand dining room in Mayfair have a row in exaggeratedly Cockney accents.

- "Oranges and Lemons" (written 1925)

Grace and Violet, two middle-aged women staying in a Bloomsbury boarding house – one of them rather staid, the other more skittish – find two young men in their bedroom, mistaking it for their own. Grace is outraged; Violet is more welcoming.

== Critical reception ==
The theatrical newspaper The Era described the show as "a revue in the truest sense of the word ... a survey of the Dance during the past forty years or so, from the high-kicking quadrille of the Moulin Rouge in 1888 to the last word in the vortex of movement." The reviewer in The Sunday Times was not impressed, calling it "a curious mixture of perfect beauty and perfect drivel," with "not a good tune in the whole piece"; whereas The Times's critic responded more positively, commenting that "as a whole, with the dancing always preponderating, the revue [was] excellent." The Era's reviewer wrote, "The most comical thing in the revue is the Vicarage Garden Party on the lines of a musical comedy, with Miss Hermione Baddeley giving a clever and cruel burlesque of Nellie, the heroine, and Mr Ernest Thesiger and Mr Douglas Byng, as two clergymen, singing the funniest number of the evening."
