= Alice Delysia =

French actress and singer (1889–1979)

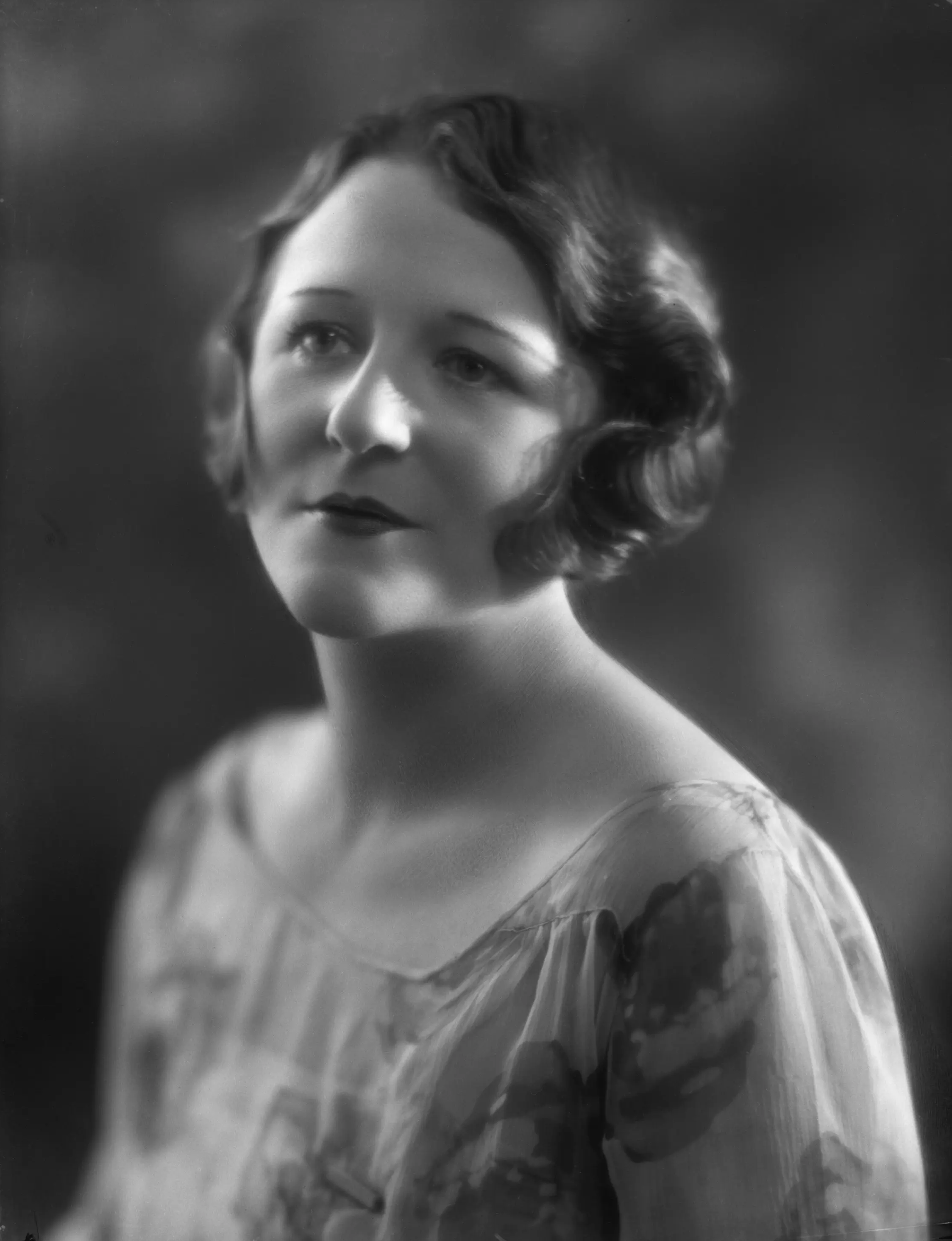
Delysia in 1925

Alice Henriette Lapize (3 March 1889 – 10 February 1979), better known by her stage name, Alice Delysia and sometimes Elise Delisia, was a French actress and singer who made her career in English musical theatre. After performing in the chorus at the Moulin Rouge and other theatres in Paris from the age of 14, she became a chorus girl in Edwardian musical comedies, briefly on Broadway in 1905, then in London for several years and back in Paris in 1912.

She got her big break in 1913, when she was offered a leading role in a revue presented by the impresario C B Cochran. The show was a hit and established Delysia as a star. During World War I, she starred in a string of West End revues and an operetta, all of which consolidated her success. In the star vehicle Afgar, from 1919 to 1921, first in London, then New York and on tour in the U.S., Delysia's fame was at its height, and her lively performance was celebrated by the critics. Returning to London in 1922, Delysia fell ill and was forced to withdraw temporarily from the stage.

From 1924, she was again starring in revues, including the successful 1925 London show On With the Dance, which helped to establish Noël Coward's fame. Another highlight, in 1926, was Princess Charming. In the later 1920s and the 1930s she played in a range of musical theatre and, increasingly, in non-musical comic plays in London, earning further critical accolades. During the Second World War she abandoned the West End and devoted herself to entertaining British and allied troops, marrying a naval officer in the Free French Forces. After the war, she retired completely, accompanying her diplomat husband on various overseas postings. She returned to England in her last years.

== Life and career ==
=== Early years ===
Delysia was born Alice Henriette Lapize, in Paris, the daughter of Henri Lapize, a sculptor, and Mathilde Douce. She was a cousin of French bicyclist Octave Lapize. Delysia was educated at the Convent des Sœurs de Nevers. In 1903, at the age of 14, she made her stage debut in the chorus for the French premiere of The Belle of New York at the Théâtre du Moulin Rouge. During the next two years she was in the chorus of the Variétés and the Folies Bergère.

Chorus of La belle de New York, 1903

In 1905 Delysia was one of the French "Gibson Girls" in The Catch of the Season at Daly's Theatre, New York, with Edna May in the leading role. She moved to London, where she continued to appear on the stage until 1909, when she temporarily abandoned the theatrical profession. She lived for some years with the singer and songwriter Harry Fragson. In 1912 they parted, and she returned to France, resuming her theatrical career in Paris, in, among other shows, a French translation of The Quaker Girl.

In 1913, Delysia was spotted by the English impresario C B Cochran, who saw her playing a small role at the Olympia variety theatre in Paris. He was planning to stage intimate Parisian-style revue in London, and he offered Delysia £6 a week to appear for him in London. He gave her the starring role in his first revue in 1914, Odds and Ends, by Harry Grattan at the Ambassadors Theatre. Cochran's biographer James Harding writes that Odds and Ends "set the standard of all his subsequent revues: beautiful dresses, taste, wit, elegance, brightness, and colour." The Times called the show "a pleasant piece of nonsense and sense combined", The revue was originally the final part of a triple bill. The Daily Express commented on the first item:

This is the startling disrobing act performed by Mlle. Alice Delysia, a pretty young Frenchwoman, in a travesty called "My Lady's Undress", Fortunately, the incident ended abruptly, and in pitch darkness, otherwise the Censor of Plays, if he were present, might possibly have been seen to blush.

C. B. Cochran in 1916

The censor, the Lord Chamberlain, hastened to see the show, and demanded changes. After an uncertain start, the revue was a huge success; the song "We don't want to lose you, but we think you ought to go", encouraging young men to join the army, was a particular hit for Delysia. Within weeks the other items in the triple bill were dropped, and Odds and Ends was expanded to a full evening, with only a brief curtain raiser. Within two months of the opening, Delysia was an established star, invited to take part with Muriel Foster, Charles Hawtrey, Oscar Asche and Isidore de Lara in a charity matinée attended by Queen Alexandra. It was the first of many charity appearances that Delysia made during the war. Her biographer Anne Pimlott Baker writes that Delysia entertained wounded troops, and took many French refugees and orphans into her home. In 1916, she made her film début, and took a leading role in SHE, an adaptation of the Rider Haggard story, about a woman's passion for a young traveller.

=== West End star ===
Delysia was the star of the two further revues that Cochran staged at the Ambassadors, More, in 1915, again by Grattan, and Pell Mell by Fred Thompson and Morris Harvey in 1916. The authors of the latter announced that their show not only possessed no plot, but was "fully as coherent played backwards as it was played forwards." It was nonetheless successful, and further enhanced Delysia's status. She had by now moved from earning £6 a week to £100.

Delysia in 1916

In 1917 Cochran decided that the Ambassadors was too small to accommodate his planned productions, and he moved to the Prince of Wales Theatre, which with 1,000 seats had more than twice the capacity of the Ambassadors. He temporarily forsook revue and mounted an operetta, Carminetta, with music by Emile Lassailly, Herman Finck and Herman Darewski and libretto by André Barde and C A Carpentier. It starred Delysia in the title role as the passionate but prim daughter of Carmen and Don José. The Observer commented, "Mlle. Delysia raved and stormed and languished indefatigably in beads and short skirts." Delysia was not a trained singer, and nor were several other members of the cast; some critics commented on that fact, but it did not affect box-office business. The show ran from 23 August 1917 to 23 March 1918, transferring to the Garrick Theatre for the latter stages of the run.

After the run of Carminetta, Delysia returned to revue in As You Were, composed by Herman Darewski and Edouard Mathe, with a book and lyrics by Arthur Wimperis, adapted from a French revue, Plus ça change by "Rip"; it ran for a year. It opened in August 1918 at the London Pavilion, newly refurbished by Cochran ("transformed almost beyond recognition", according to The Observer). The show was structured around Delysia, giving her the chance to shine in a succession of roles including Ninon de l'Enclos, Helen of Troy, Elizabeth I, and Cleopatra. She also appeared as Lucifer, once again coming to the attention of the Lord Chamberlain for the skin-tight black costume in which she appeared. The Morning Post commented, "Never can an actress have worn so negligible a dress".

=== Post-war ===
Cochran's, and Delysia's, first new show after the war was Afgar by Fred Thompson and Worton David with music by Charles Cuvillier, which opened at the Pavilion in September 1919. It was an extravagant musical comedy set in a Moorish harem, with Delysia as Zaydee, who heads a harem strike leading to general monogamy. Of her performance, The Times said:

Delysia in Mayfair and Montmartre, 1922

It is difficult nowadays to find anything fresh to say about Delysia. She is, and always will be, one of the most indefatigable workers on the stage. It is impossible for her to keep still, but her restlessness never annoys one. She is so full of life that she is able to inspire her audience with the same feeling, and whether singing or acting she is always giving of her best. As for her costumes … well, Mr. Cochran has gone one better than even his previous best in this direction. The sigh of envy from the ladies in the audience as they gazed on these creations of Poiret could be heard all over the theatre."

The show ran in London for 300 performances, after which Delysia sailed to New York at the end of 1920 for the Broadway production at the Central Theatre, for which she was paid £2,500 a week, a prodigious sum at that time. The New York Times thought the show "sufficient-for-the-purpose" as a vehicle for the star, but declared Delysia to be "stunning". After a holiday in France, Delysia returned to North America in August 1921 for a 30-week tour of Afgar. She told The New York Times that these would be her last appearances on the stage, as once the tour was over she was to marry "the best man in the world". It is not known who the man was, and no wedding took place.

Delysia remained on the stage, returning to London for Cochran's 1922 revue Mayfair and Montmartre. The show had a mixed reception, and it suffered a fatal blow when Delysia lost her voice with a throat infection and had to withdraw from the cast six weeks into the run. She was ordered by a throat specialist to rest her voice for three months. Without its star, the show failed to attract the public, and Cochran closed it after less than two months, suffering a loss of £20,000.

In 1923 and 1924, Delysia made further Broadway appearances, in The Courtesan, a musical comedy, and in the Shubert revue, Topics of 1924. In 1925 she returned to the Cochran stable, starring in his revue On With the Dance, much of which was written and composed by Noël Coward. During rehearsals for the show, Cochran disliked Coward's song "Poor Little Rich Girl", written for Delysia, and he wanted to cut it. He backed down in the face of implacable resistance from the author and the performer, and it became Coward's first hit song. Delysia became proprietorial about the number, and was outraged when Coward contemplated giving it to Gertrude Lawrence to sing in New York. Harding writes, "'Noel', she screamed with excellent command of idiom if not of accent, 'is a sheet and a boogairr.'" Coward later wrote of Delysia, "Everything she did she did well, with a satisfying authority and assurance. She was occasionally temperamental and flew into a few continental rages but to me she was always easy to work with and extremely agreeable." Cochran, too, found Delysia a congenial colleague; in his several volumes of autobiography he makes many references to her loyalty and good nature.

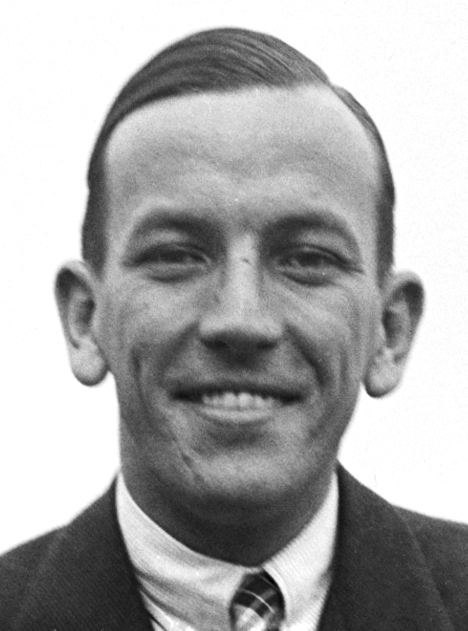
Noël Coward, mid-1920s

In 1923 and 1924, Delysia made further Broadway appearances, in The Courtesan, a musical comedy, and in the Shubert revue, Topics of 1924. In London, Delysia starred with George Grossmith, Jr and W. H. Berry in Princess Charming (1926), a Ruritanian musical comedy. In November 1928 she married Georges Emile Denis, the general manager of a newspaper. In 1929 she made her first appearance in a non-musical play, Her Past, a comedy by Frederick Jackson, co-starring Violet Vanbrugh. The Times said of her performance:

If she has a dull phrase to speak she speaks it as if it had that moment leapt joyfully to her mind; if she has a good saying, it comes from her with a sparkle seven times its own. Her eyes have humour, her fingers, wit; she gives an exquisite grace to trifles; and when she wishes to be serious for a moment, no one is impatient, every one listens, knowing that good seriousness will suddenly break into a mocking flash. And even when she bows in acknowledgment of a tumult of applause there is, in her delicate graciousness, something which distinguishes an actress from those who hopefully gambol on to the stage and cheerfully flounder off it.

=== 1930s ===
Delysia began the 1930s by appearing in variety. She topped the bill at the London Palladium in 1930, but the songs she chose to perform were regarded as either dated or dull. During the same year, she appeared in two successive failures in the West End. An adaptation of Marcel Pagnol's Topaze, which was a huge success in Paris, failed to sparkle in its English version, despite a starry cast in which Delysia was joined by Raymond Massey, Martita Hunt, Donald Wolfit and Frank Cellier. The second failure was A Pair of Trousers, a farcical comedy, which The Times declared so boring that "all the Delysian sparkle" could not save it.

Delysia returned to musical comedy in 1932 in the London production of The Cat and the Fiddle, by Jerome Kern and Otto Harbach, presented by Cochran at the Palace Theatre. Her co-stars were Peggy Wood and Francis Lederer. What Pimlott Baker calls her last big London success was in 1933, in Mother of Pearl, presented by Cochran at the Gaiety Theatre. It was adapted for the English stage as a vehicle for Delysia by A. P. Herbert from Oscar Straus and Alfred Grünwald's 1932 operetta, Eine Frau, die weiß, was sie will. Delysia played Josephine Pavani, an ageing actress who loses her lover to her daughter, Pearl, and who later manoeuvres to save Pearl from an unwelcome suitor. Delysia's song "Every woman thinks she wants to wander'" was a big hit. The Times commented, "How refreshing in a musical piece to want to hear the author's words! How delightful, when Mme. Delysia is singing, to hear them!"

On screen, Delysia starred as Madame Valmond in the musical Evensong in 1934. A year later, she appeared with George Robey, in a farce, Accidentally Yours, by Clifford Grey, adapted from Monsieur à Cinq Heures, by Maurice Hennequin and Pierre Veber. The following year she appeared in her last musical comedy, The Silver Swan by Grey and Guy Bolton, with music by Edward Samuels. In 1938 she and her husband divorced. Her last London appearance was in 1939 as Hortense in The French for Love, a light comedy by Marguerite Steen and Derek Patmore, co-starring with Athene Seyler and Cecil Parker.

=== Second World War and later years ===
Delysia's patriotism led her to support the Free French Forces and their British allies. From 1941 until the end of the war, she was a member of the Entertainments National Service Association and entertained Allied troops in Africa, the Middle East and Europe. In January 1944 she married Commander René Kolb-Bernard of the Free French Navy. After the war she retired from the stage, and accompanied her husband to a succession of diplomatic postings to which he was sent by the French government. His last post was French consul in the Canary Islands, where Delysia spent much of her retirement. After his death, she moved back to England.

Among the honours presented to Delysia were the King's Medal for Freedom; the Africa Star, 8th Army; Medal of French Gratitude; Free French Medal; and the Order of Merit of Lebanon and Syria.

Delysia died of cancer at the age of 89 in the French Convalescent Home, Brighton.
