= Charles B. Cochran =

English theatrical producer (1872–1951)

Cochran in 1916

Sir Charles Blake Cochran (25 September 1872 – 31 January 1951), professionally known as C. B. Cochran or Charles B. Cochran, was an English impresario, known for popularising the genre of revue, hitherto unfamiliar, in Britain. Apart from revue, his major theatrical successes included The Miracle in 1911, noted for its spectacular staging, The Better 'Ole (1917), This Year of Grace (1928), Bitter Sweet (1929), Cavalcade (1931) and Bless the Bride (1947). He also promoted a range of other entertainments, including professional boxing, tennis, wrestling, circus and a zoo. He published four volumes of memoirs about his life and work.

After beginning his career as an actor in the US in 1891, Cochran became a manager and press agent for theatrical and other entertainments. He returned to England in 1899 managing entertainers and eventually was producing theatre, sporting events, variety shows and revues. As a theatrical producer he was responsible for West End and some Broadway productions of shows by Noël Coward, Cole Porter, Vivian Ellis and Rogers and Hart as well as a wide range of plays by writers including Henrik Ibsen, James Barrie, Sean O'Casey, A. P. Herbert and Eugene O'Neill.

Cochran was a leading impresario of his generation. Some of his productions were unsustainably lavish and expensive, leaving him bankrupt twice. Nevertheless, by the end of his career he had been honoured with a knighthood in Britain and the Legion of Honour in France.

== Life and career ==
=== Early years ===
Cochran was born on 25 September 1872 in Brighton, Sussex, the fourth of the nine children of James Elphinstone Cochran, a tea and cigar importer, and his wife, Matilda Arnold née Walton, the daughter of a merchant navy officer. In December 1879, at the age of seven, the boy saw the pantomime Sinbad the Sailor at the Theatre Royal, Brighton, starring Arthur Roberts. This experience inspired a lifelong passion for the theatre. At Brighton, Hove and Sussex Grammar School between 1883 and 1888 he shared a study with Aubrey Beardsley; they shared an enthusiasm for acting and appeared at the Brighton Pavilion in a play written by Beardsley. With Beardsley, Cochran saw a West End production of As You Like It in July 1890 given by Augustin Daly's visiting Broadway company, led by John Drew and Ada Rehan. Cochran determined to pursue a stage career in New York. After briefly working as a clerk in Brighton, he absconded with some of his employer's money and sailed to the US in 1891. (Note: After returning to England he strove to make amends by sending his former employer first-night tickets for his shows.)

He secured engagements in small roles in adaptations of Around the World in Eighty Days and Rip Van Winkle, but was otherwise so unsuccessful that he was forced to take what work he could get, ranging from selling fountain-pens at the Chicago World's Fair to serving as assistant to the Anglican chaplain at New York harbour. Eventually, he was employed by the actor-manager Richard Mansfield, who thought he would never be a good actor (and told him so) but foresaw a managerial career for him, and appointed him as his private secretary at a salary ten dollars higher than he had enjoyed as an actor. After a disagreement with Mansfield, Cochran set up an acting school in New York in partnership with the actor E. J. Henley (brother of the poet W. E. Henley) and began producing serious drama in 1897, with Ibsen's John Gabriel Borkman, at Hoyt's Theatre in New York with Henley in the title role. Later in that year Cochran returned to London, working as a journalist. Seeing a production of Cyrano de Bergerac in Paris, with Benoît-Constant Coquelin in the title role, he was convinced that Mansfield should play the part in New York. Cochran's biographer Vivian Ellis comments that this was one of the earliest instances of Cochran's ability to star an actor in the right vehicle. He was reconciled with Mansfield and returned to the US as his manager, organising his nationwide tour of Cyrano de Bergerac.

=== First London productions ===
Cochran returned to London in 1899 and set up business in Chancery Lane as a theatrical agent. Gradually he gained success in management, representing Mistinguett, Ethel Levey, Harry Houdini, Odette Dulac and the wrestler George Hackenschmidt, the last of whom he matched at Olympia in 1904 against Ahmed Madrali, the "Terrible Turk". His first theatrical venture in London production, a farce called Sporting Simpson at the Royalty Theatre in 1902, was a failure. His second attempt, at the same theatre, Lyre and Lancet – an adaptation by F. Anstey and Kinsey Peile of the former's articles in Punch – also failed and in 1903 he was declared bankrupt. Hackenschmidt came to his rescue, paying off his debts for him. In 1905 Cochran married Evelyn Alice Dade, the daughter of a captain in the merchant navy. The marriage was lifelong and devoted, despite occasional infidelities on Cochran's part; they had no children.

Setting for The Miracle (1911)

Between 1903 and the First World War Cochran restored his finances with other ventures, from roller-skating to circuses at Earl's Court and Olympia. His greatest success of those years was Max Reinhardt's spectacular production of Karl Vollmöller's wordless play The Miracle. The original idea came from Cochran, who suggested to Reinhardt that he should stage a mystery play set in the Middle Ages, and that Olympia should be converted to look like a cathedral for the purpose. Reinhardt gave him a letter of introduction to Vollmöller who prepared a scenario. Cochran accepted it and worked in close collaboration with Reinhardt, the designer Ernst Stern and the composer Engelbert Humperdinck. The play opened at Olympia on 23 December 1911. Initially, box-office takings were disappointing, but Hamilton Fyfe of The Daily Mail wrote of his astonishment "that so wonderful a spectacle as The Miracle" was drawing so few people, after which the Mail's proprietor, Lord Northcliffe, had his other papers extolling the play, and it became a success. The biographer Samuel Heppner writes that the piece then played to full houses, "turning away disappointed members of the public in their thousands". Ellis comments that subsequently "the eulogies Cochran received from the Northcliffe press were offset by his more critical reception by other popular newspapers".

The next attraction Cochran presented at Olympia was Carl Hagenbeck's "Wonder Zoo and Big Circus" in 1913. A London newspaper reported in January 1914 that the show "has broken all records for Olympia. Gigantic as the place is, it is difficult to find room for all who wish to see what a first-class circus is really like".

=== Revue ===
Alice Delysia in 1914

In May 1914 Cochran took a lease of the Ambassadors, one of the West End's smaller theatres, with a capacity of 490 seats. The outbreak of war brought what The Times described as "something like a theatrical 'boom' as the prevailing mood, of troops and public alike, called for gaiety, lightness, and colour to offset the grim business in hand". Cochran turned to the genre of revue, hitherto little seen in Britain, (Note: Revues had long been popular in France, but despite efforts by nineteenth-century English writers such as James Planché they did not become popular with British audiences until the first quarter of the twentieth century.) and had a conspicuous box-office success in October 1914 with what the biographer James Ross Moore calls a "bare-bones" production, Odds and Ends. This show, with words by Harry Grattan and music by Edward Jones, starred Cochran's discovery Alice Delysia. Her song "We don't want to lose you, but we think you ought to go", encouraging young men to join the army, was a particular hit. The revue dispensed with spectacular décor and a large cast in favour of a more intimate style with modest staging – one critic commented that Cochran had spared no economy in mounting the show. At the first night the revue was part of a triple bill, but the other two parts were soon dropped, and Odds and Ends was expanded to a full evening, with only a brief curtain raiser. The revue appealed to the public and the show ran for more than 500 performances. Another musical comedy was Houp La! (1916), which Cochran produced at London's new St Martin's Theatre, where he had signed a 21-year lease, starring Gertie Millar.

After several more revues and musical comedies, Cochran produced two sociological plays by Eugène Brieux – Damaged Goods (Les Avariés) and The Three Daughters of M. Dupont (Les Trois Filles de M. Dupont). In 1917, at the Oxford Music Hall, London, he put on Bruce Bairnsfather's comedy The Better 'Ole, which ran for 817 performances. At the Pavilion in 1918 he produced the revue As You Were, composed by Herman Darewski and Edouard Mathe, with words by Arthur Wimperis, and starring Delysia, which ran for a year. (Note: The piece was adapted from a French revue, Plus ça change, by "Rip") Cochran was now, according to The Times "a power in the entertainment world". In 1919 he took control of the Garrick and Aldwych theatres and the Holborn Stadium, where he promoted many high-profile boxing matches, including Bombardier Billy Wells versus Joe Beckett and Beckett versus Georges Carpentier. Cochran later wrote:

Even now I meet people who find it hard to understand my reasons for entering upon boxing promotion at a time when I was so active with the theatre, but the explanation is a perfectly simple one. I am – and I pride myself on it – a showman, and it is part of a showman’s business to sense the public taste, and, if he can, to forestall its demands. ... At that time the National Sporting Club was the official home of the sport, but it was comparatively small, and it needed no particular foresight to see that, with its limitations of space, it would soon find it impossible to stage championship contests for the gigantic stakes which were beginning to be asked for by the boxers and their managers. (Note: Cochran later became disillusioned with the corruption of professional boxing and in 1927 he turned to tennis, signing Suzanne Lenglen, Dora Köring, Evelyn Dewhurst, Karel Koželuh and Howard Kinsey for a seven-stop professional head-to-head tour of the United Kingdom. It was not a great financial success.)

=== Bankruptcy, recovery and Coward ===
"Dance Little Lady", from This Year of Grace (1928): Jessie Matthews menaced by masked chorus

In the first years of the next decade Cochran presented a string of revues and a wide range of other theatrical productions, including Sarah Bernhardt's last London season, at the Prince's Theatre (1921), a season by Diaghilev's Ballets Russes at the Prince's (1921), the Chauve-Souris ballet company at the Pavilion (1921), and a 1923 season of Eleonora Duse at matinées and Sacha Guitry in the evenings at the New Oxford. The revues included London, Paris and New York (1920), with music by Herman Darewski; Fun of the Fayre (1921); The League of Notions (1921); Mayfair and Montmartre (1922); and Dover Street to Dixie (1923), featuring the American singer Florence Mills. The later shows were lavishly and expensively mounted: expenditure outran receipts. Hoping to recoup his losses Cochran put on a season of American plays in 1923, including Eugene O'Neill's Anna Christie and The Hairy Ape, which did not repeat in the West End the success they had enjoyed in the US, and a spectacular rodeo at Wembley failed to attract the crowds. In September 1924 Cochran was bankrupt for the second time.

Quickly discharged from bankruptcy, "penniless but ebullient" in Ellis's phrase, Cochran wrote his first book of memoirs, The Secrets of a Showman (1925). With the proceeds and financial backing from supporters, he began his association with Noël Coward with the revue On with the Dance (1925) at the London Pavilion (the first show to feature "Mr Cochran's Young Ladies"). The show, with sketches by Coward and musical numbers by Coward and Philip Braham, ran for 229 performances after which a revised version was presented. In 1926 he booked Lew Leslie's Blackbirds of 1926 revue with an all-black cast, including Florence Mills, which ran for 279 performances at the Pavilion. The show was a financial and artistic success, and historians later noted that "Blackbirds mania" took hold in London for a while, with Blackbirds-themed society parties being given. The show was taking in at least $12,500 a week (equivalent to $231,681 in 2025) at the box office, setting house records for several nights. Young members of the British royal family took an interest in the show, especially Edward, the Prince of Wales, which contributed greatly to its popularity. By the time the revue finished its run, the prince, who had admired Mills since her first appearance in London in 1923, had seen it at least eleven times. Mills became "the sensation of the season".

Cochran managed Royal Albert Hall from 1926 to 1938. Cochran and Coward worked together again in 1928 on This Year of Grace, which ran for 316 performances in the West End and 157 performances on Broadway. Away from revue, Cochran produced Coward's 1929 operetta Bitter Sweet, which ran at His Majesty's for 697 performances. In between the Coward shows Cochran presented a Pirandello season, Sean O'Casey's The Silver Tassie (1929), the Lunts in Sil-Vara's play Caprice (1929), Cole Porter's revue Wake up and Dream (1929) which also went to Broadway, and Rodgers and Hart's Ever Green (1930), with Jessie Matthews.

=== Later years ===
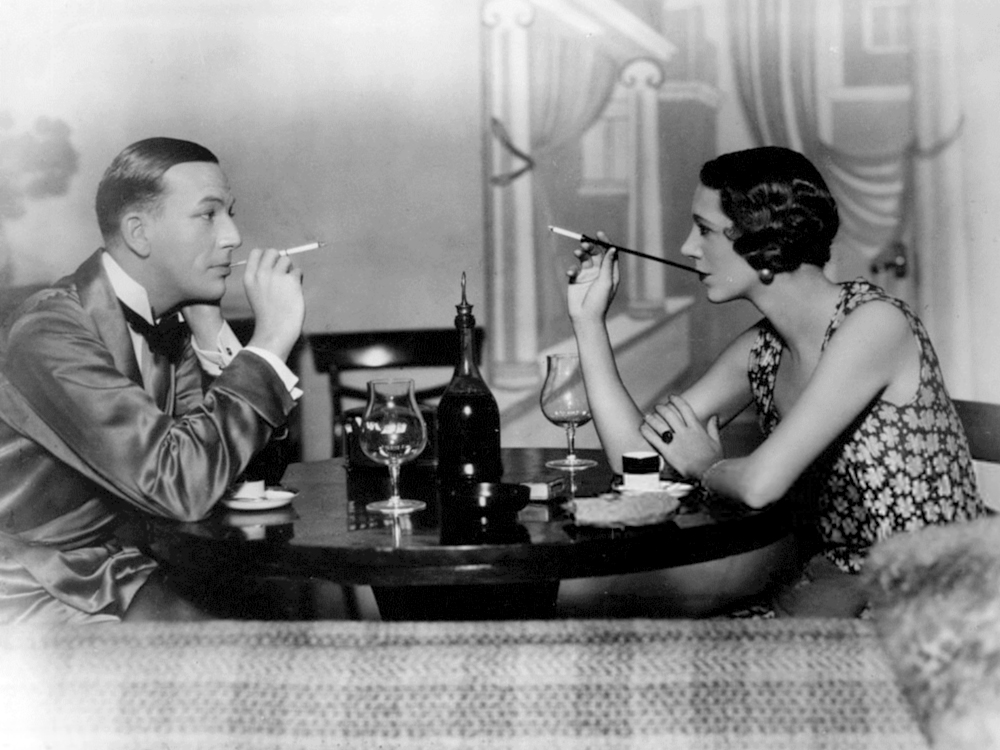
Private Lives, 1930: Noël Coward and Gertrude Lawrence

In 1930 Cochran produced Coward's comedy of manners Private Lives, which at the author's insistence played for a limited three-month season. It sold out within a week and was still playing to packed houses when it closed, despite, in Coward's words, "the gratifying knowledge that we could have run on for another six [months]". Coward and Cochran next collaborated with the spectacular family epic Cavalcade, which ran at Drury Lane for 405 performances from October 1931. Their last revue together was Words and Music in 1932, and their final collaboration was on Coward's Conversation Piece in 1934. After that, Coward ended the professional relationship, feeling that Cochran benefited disproportionately from their collaboration, although James Harding in The Oxford Dictionary of National Biography comments that Coward's subsequent musical shows "never prospered as had those which enjoyed Cochran's magic touch".

Cochran's association and friendship with A. P. Herbert began in 1932 with the lavish production, directed by Reinhardt, of Helen, Herbert's adaptation of Offenbach's La belle Hélène at the Adelphi Theatre, starring Evelyn Laye in the title role. In the following year Cochran staged Porter's Nymph Errant starring Gertrude Lawrence. This was the last of his successes for several years: there followed what Ellis calls "the lean years". His London production of Anything Goes at the Palace Theatre in 1935 ran for 261 performances, while his Broadway transfer of Escape Me Never (1935) managed only 96. The Boy David (1936), James Barrie's last play, starring Elisabeth Bergner, failed at the box-office as did the coronation revue, Home and Beauty and Franz Lehár's Paganini, starring Richard Tauber. Ellis writes that "a trip to America proved financially abortive".

During the Second World War Cochran produced nothing notable, but in 1946 he successfully renewed his collaboration with Herbert in Big Ben, with music by Ellis, followed by Bless the Bride (1947), which ran for 886 performances, the longest run of any of Cochran's shows. He was knighted in 1948 and appointed a chevalier of the Legion of Honour in 1950.

In his later years Cochran had severe arthritis for which he found very hot baths a relief. One day in January 1951 he misjudged the temperature of the water and was badly scalded, dying in hospital a week later on 31 January. When the news of his death was announced, the BBC interrupted a broadcast to transmit a 25-minute tribute to him. He was cremated at Golders Green Crematorium on 3 February. (Note: Among the mourners at the cremation were Anna Neagle, Herbert Wilcox, Evelyn Laye, Frank Lawton, Dorothy Dickson, Elsie Randolph, Jack Buchanan, Vivian Ellis, Wendy Toye and Bernard Delfont; Delysia and Coward (who was in Jamaica) sent floral tributes.) A bust of Cochran was placed in the foyer of the Adelphi Theatre and a memorial panel to him was unveiled in St Paul's, Covent Garden (known as "the actors' church") in 1953.

== Publications ==
- Secrets of a Showman (1925)
- C.B.C.'s Review of Revues and Other Matters (ed., 1930)
- I Had Almost Forgotten (1932)
- Cock-a-Doodle-Do (1941)
- Showman Looks On (1945)

== Notes, references and sources ==
=== Sources ===
- Bressey, Caroline; Romain, Gemma (2019). "Staging race: Florence Mills, celebrity, identity and performance in 1920s Britain". Women's History Review. 28 (3): 380–395. doi:10.1080/09612025.2018.1493119.
- Cochran, Charles B (1925). Secrets of a Showman. New York: Henry Holt and Company.
- Cochran, Charles B (1945). Showman Looks On. London: Dent. OCLC 2456326.
- Coward, Noël (1986). Autobiography. London: Methuen. ISBN 978-0-41-360660-0.
- Day, Barry (2004). The Complete Lyrics of P. G. Wodehouse. Lanham, Maryland: Scarecrow Press. ISBN 0-8108-4994-1.
- Egan, Bill (2004). Florence Mills: Harlem Jazz Queen. Lanham, Md.: Scarecrow Press. ISBN 0-8108-5007-9.
- Gaye, Freda, ed. (1967). Who's Who in the Theatre (fourteenth ed.). London: Sir Isaac Pitman and Sons. OCLC 5997224.
- Graves, Charles (1951). The Cochran Story: A Biography of Sir Charles Blake Cochran, Kt. London: W.H. Allen. OCLC 30180852.
- Heppner, Samuel (1969). Cockie. London: Frewin. ISBN 978-0-09-095410-0.
- Hoare, Philip (1995). Noël Coward, A Biography. London: Sinclair-Stevenson. ISBN 978-1-4081-0675-4.
- Kane, Josephine (2016). The Architecture of Pleasure: British Amusement Parks 1900–1939. London: Routledge. ISBN 978-1-13-826956-9.
- Little, Alan (2007). Suzanne Lenglen: Tennis Idol of the Twenties. London: The Wimbledon Lawn Tennis Museum. ISBN 978-0906741436.
- Mander, Raymond; Mitchenson, Joe (1971). Revue: A Story in Pictures. London: Peter Davies. ISBN 978-0-43-209076-3.
- Mander, Raymond; Mitchenson, Joe (2000) [1957]. Barry Day; Sheridan Morley (eds.). Theatrical Companion to Coward (second ed.). London: Oberon Books. ISBN 978-1-84002-054-0.
- Parker, John, ed. (1922). Who's Who in the Theatre (fourth ed.). London: Sir Isaac Pitman and Sons. OCLC 473894893.
- Parker, John; Freda Gaye; Ian Herbert, eds. (1978). Who Was Who in the Theatre. Detroit: Gale Research. ISBN 978-0-8103-0406-2. OCLC 310466458.
- Short, Ernest; Arthur Compton-Rickett (1970) [1938]. Ring up the Curtain – Being a Pageant of English Entertainment Covering Half a Century. London: Herbert Jenkins. ISBN 978-0-8369-5299-5. OCLC 1411533.
- Symonds, Dominic (2015). We'll Have Manhattan: The Early Work of Rodgers & Hart. Oxford University Press. ISBN 978-0199929481.
- Wearing, J. P. (1982). The London Stage, 1910–1919: a calendar of plays and players. Lanham, Maryland: Scarecrow Press. ISBN 0-8108-1596-6.
