= Mander and Mitchenson =

English theatre historians

Mander (left) and Mitchenson (standing) with Noël Coward looking at the Theatrical Companion to Coward 1957

Raymond Mander (15 July 1911 – 27 December 1983) and Joe Mitchenson (4 October 1911 – 7 October 1992) were theatre historians and joint founders of a large collection of theatrical memorabilia.

Both began their careers as actors, but what began as a shared hobby turned into full-time work in running the Mander and Mitchenson Theatre Collection (MMTC) and writing books, reviews and articles on theatre, opera and ballet. The collection remained their private property until 1977, when they handed it over to a trust. After the deaths of the founders the collection was moved first to the Jerwood Library of the Performing Arts in Greenwich, and, in 2010, to the Theatre Collection of the University of Bristol.

During the founders' lifetimes the collection contributed illustrations to more than four hundred books, and has remained one of the most important resources for authors writing about history of the British theatre.

== Biographies ==
=== Early years ===
Raymond Josiah Gale Mander was born in Clapham, London, the only son of Albert Edwin Mander, an architect and surveyor, and his wife, Edith Christina, née Gale. He was educated at Battersea Grammar School and became an actor when he left school, making his debut at Bedford in Harold Neilson's touring Shakespeare company. In the West End he appeared in a spectacular production of Henry V at Drury Lane in 1938, the year before he first worked with Joe Mitchenson.

Francis Joseph Blackett Mitchenson was born in Southgate, London, the only son of Francis William Mitchenson, a general merchant, and his wife, Sarah, née Roddam. Unlike Mander's family, which had no special association with the theatre, Mitchenson's had stage connections on his mother's and his father's side. His father was a part-time drama critic, and his mother was a keen amateur actress. Their marriage broke up when Mitchenson was a boy, and he was brought up by his mother. He was educated privately, and at the age of eight he enrolled at the Fay Compton Studio of Dramatic Art. A fellow student there was Alec Guinness, alongside whom he made his first West End stage appearance, walking on in a drama called Libel! at the Playhouse Theatre.

Mander and Mitchenson met in February 1939, and later in that year they were both cast in a production of The Merry Wives of Windsor, Mander as Master Page and Mitchenson as Fenton. They toured with Neilson's company, playing small roles. During the Second World War Mander worked for the BBC, presenting radio programmes including a series called Actors Remember in which he interviewed veteran performers, such as Walter Passmore reminiscing about Richard D'Oyly Carte, Ada Reeve about George Edwardes, and Leslie Henson about George Grossmith Jr. He also wrote material for other presenters, usually in collaboration with Mitchenson. Mitchenson served in the army, until being invalided out in 1943. He resumed his stage career for a few years, before giving up regular acting in 1948.

=== Collecting ===
As well as being partners in their private lives, and sometimes appearing in productions together, Mander and Mitchenson shared a passion for collecting theatrical memorabilia. They began their joint collection in 1939, and when on tour in the 1940s they would take every opportunity to add to it. Mitchenson's obituarist in The Times wrote, "[They] would raid antique shops and second-hand bookshops in search of anything which carried a morsel of theatrical history. It could be a postcard, or a playbill, a painting or a figurine representing some past performance, or, better still, a discarded costume or prop."

Their consuming interest gradually overtook their acting careers. They presented small exhibitions of theatre memorabilia around Britain and collaborated on a series of books, the first of which, Hamlet Through the Ages, was published in 1952. It set the pattern for a further eighteen books, published between then and 1980: brief notes accompanying lavish illustrations (this first book contained 257 plates ranging from the frontispiece to a 1709 edition of the play to Guinness's Hamlet in 1951).

The ever-expanding collection was housed in Mitchenson's family house in Sydenham. Their biographer Rupert Rhymes writes:

Over the years this tall Victorian terraced house … overflowed with an amazing treasure trove of playbills and books from seventeenth-century folios onwards, programmes, periodicals, gramophone records, playwrights' prompt scripts, drawings, designs, and china figurines of great actors and actresses in their most famous roles. ... Anything which narrated theatre history was avidly acquired, magpie fashion.

John Gielgud commented in 1968, "Mander and Mitchenson are a strange freakish pair – no taste but enormous diligence, and they have a remarkable collection of materials of all kinds and are really dedicated collectors – middle aged, one rather dandified, the other with a broken nose, looking like a Shaw burglar". Noël Coward, who referred to them as "Gog and Magog", (Note: The dedication on the title page of The Theatrical Companion to Coward reads, "To The Master in sincere admiration, 'Gog and Magog'") and dubbed them "the truffle hounds of the theatre", so trusted their theatrical judgment that he left instructions in his will that after his death his estate should take advice from them, together with Sheridan Morley, on the continuing use of his literary and dramatic works. Sybil Thorndike, who referred to Mander and Mitchenson as "my dear detectives", gave them gifts and financial donations, calling their collection "the profession's passport to posterity". Rhymes writes of Mander and Mitchenson's place in the theatrical scene in London, "In the 1960s and 1970s 'Ray and Joe' became a theatrical institution and, dressed in style, invariably held court at first nights, reflecting on previous productions and associated gossip."

By the end of the 1970s it was clear that the collection required larger premises, and the eighteenth-century Beckenham Place Park was selected, with the aid of the local authority. The move had scarcely begun when Mander died at Hither Green Hospital, London, on 20 December 1983, aged 72, of bronchopneumonia and emphysema. Mitchenson moved to Beckenham with the collection and lived there until his death in Orpington Hospital, London, on 7 October 1992, aged 81, from renal failure and prostatic hypertrophy.

From the Mander and Mitchenson collection

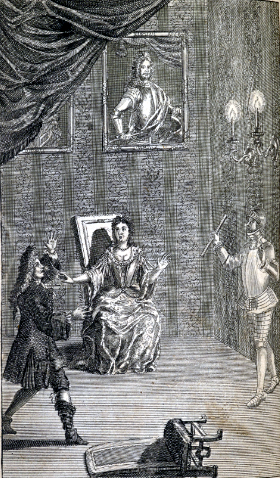
Hamlet, 1709

The Oxford Music Hall, 1861

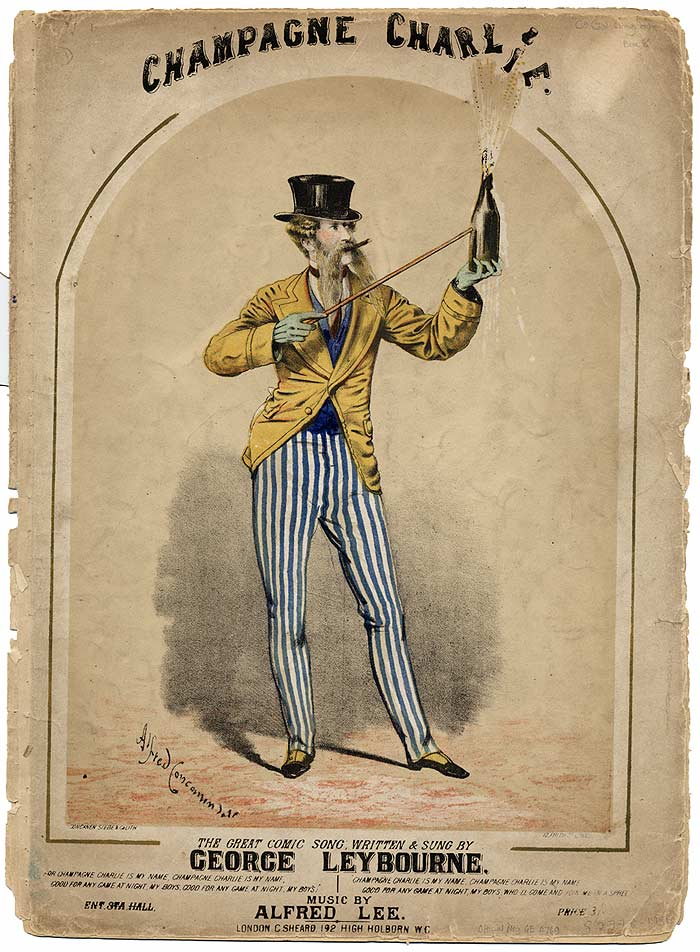
Champagne Charlie, 1866

Walter Passmore in The Sorcerer, 1891

== Mander and Mitchenson Theatre Collection ==
In later years Mander and Mitchenson wrote that the collection was founded in 1939 "with the aim of covering all aspects of the theatre, opera, and ballet", although in its early years it grew haphazardly rather than systematically. Even once it was established and widely-known it remained the private property of Mander and Mitchenson until 1977, when they handed it over to a trust, chaired by Laurence Olivier. Over the years it was expanded by the acquisition of the theatrical portion of the Randall H. New Collection and the library and personal theatre records of John Parker, the long-serving editor of Who's Who in the Theatre. Parker's successor, Freda Gaye, described the MMTC as "a veritable museum [which] contains engravings, paintings, souvenirs, photographs, china figures, files of programmes of the London and provincial theatres, and a library of several thousand books." She added that it was used extensively by authors, designers, publishers, the BBC and other television producers.

From as early as 1944 Mander and Mitchenson felt that their collection might eventually be bequeathed to the nation. At one point they hoped it would be housed at the new National Theatre on the South Bank in London when it opened in the 1970s, but the collection was too large to be accommodated there. The Beckenham site proved financially unsustainable, and in 2001, after a brief period in temporary accommodation – a disused cricket pavilion in south London – the collection was moved to a new home as part of the Jerwood Library of the Performing Arts in Greenwich. In 2010 it was announced that the trustees had agreed to house the entire collection permanently at the University of Bristol, as part of its extensive theatre archive.

There was some controversy about the move from London to Bristol. Rhymes, who was a former chairman of the MMTC Trust, said he was "appalled at the prospect of the collection moving out of London away from Theatreland which was Ray and Joe’s life". But the move was backed, and part-funded, by the Noël Coward Foundation and the Cameron Mackintosh Foundation. Bristol University already had an important theatre archive focusing strongly on provincial and 20th-century British drama; the preponderance of London-centred material from the 18th and 19th centuries in the MMTC was seen as an ideal match, creating the second-biggest collection of British theatre memorabilia. (Note: The biggest is held by the Victoria and Albert Museum.) The university made it clear that the collection would be available to everyone: "We run ourselves as a public museum, as well as a university archive, so anyone can make an appointment to come and study something from the collection".

== Publications ==
Mander and Mitchenson contributed introductions to four volumes of Noël Coward's collected plays, and numerous articles and reviews to the Encyclopædia Britannica, Theatre Notebook and Books and Bookmen. They contributed illustrations from their collection to more than four hundred publications.

Their own books were:

- Hamlet Through the Ages, 1952 (2nd, revised edition 1955)
- Theatrical Companion to Shaw, 1954
- Theatrical Companion to Maugham, 1955
- The Artist and the Theatre, 1955
- Theatrical Companion to Coward, 1957
- A Picture History of British Theatre, 1957
- The Gay Twenties, 1958 (with J. C. Trewin)
- A Picture History of Opera, 1959 (with Philip Hope-Wallace)
- The Turbulent Thirties, 1960 (with J. C. Trewin)
- The Theatres of London, 1961, illustrated by Timothy Birdsall (2nd, revised edition, paperback, 1963; 3rd revised edition 1975)

- A Picture History of Gilbert and Sullivan, 1962
- British Music Hall: A Story in Pictures, 1965 (2nd edition, revised and enlarged 1974)
- Lost Theatres of London, 1968 (2nd edition, revised and enlarged, 1976)
- Musical Comedy: A Story in Pictures, 1969
- Revue: A Story in Pictures, 1971
- Pantomime: A Story in Pictures, 1973
- The Wagner Companion, 1977
- Victorian and Edwardian Entertainment from Old Photographs, 1978
- Guide to the W. Somerset Maugham Theatrical Paintings, 1980

Source: Who Was Who.

== Notes, references and sources ==
=== Sources ===
- Coward, Noël (1982). Graham Payn; Sheridan Morley (eds.). The Noël Coward Diaries (1941–1969). London: Methuen. ISBN 978-0-297-78142-4.
- Croall, Jonathan (2008). Sybil Thorndike: A Star of Life. London: Haus. ISBN 978-1-905791-92-7.
- Gaye, Freda, ed. (1967). Who's Who in the Theatre (fourteenth ed.). London: Sir Isaac Pitman and Sons. OCLC 5997224.
- Gielgud, John (2004). Richard Mangan (ed.). Gielgud's Letters. London: Weidenfeld and Nicolson. ISBN 978-0-297-82989-8.
- Hoare, Philip (1995). Noël Coward, A Biography. London: Sinclair-Stevenson. ISBN 978-1-4081-0675-4.
- Lesley, Cole (1976). The Life of Noël Coward. London: Cape. ISBN 978-0-224-01288-1.
