= Bertie Crewe =

English theatre architect (1860–1937)

- Born: 1860; Essex, England
- Died: 10 January 1937 (aged 77)
- Occupation: Architect
- Practice: Associated architectural firm[s]
- Buildings: Piccadilly Theatre, London; Palace Theatre, Manchester; Shaftesbury Theatre, London; Theatre Royal, Bury St Edmunds

William Robert 'Bertie' Crewe (1860 – 10 January 1937) was one of the leading English theatre architects in the boom of 1885 to 1915.

== Biography ==
Born in Essex and partly trained by Frank Matcham, Crewe and his contemporaries W.G.R. Sprague and Thomas Verity, were together responsible for the majority – certainly more than 200 – of the theatres and variety palaces of the great building boom which took place in Britain between 1885 and 1915, peaking at the turn of the century. Crewe became known as one of the most dynamic architects of the 1890s-1900s, specialising entirely in theatres and later cinemas. He also designed the Paris Alhambra for Thomas Barrasford, which opened in 1904.

Crewe trained in Paris and London, where, as a young man, he was a frequent visitor to Frank Matcham's home. Up to the mid-1890s, Crewe collaborated with Sprague, producing the Lincoln Theatre Royal as well as a number of theatres around London. It was after he branched out on his own that he developed what was to become his characteristic Baroque-influenced style. His work around the turn of the century was marked by horizontal balconies tied to ranges of stage boxes and elaborate ornamental features. Cecil Masey trained in Crewe's office, working on large theatres and music halls that Crewe designed before the First World War. Masey's designs include the theatre at Stanford Hall, Nottinghamshire. In the early 1930s Masey worked for Sidney Bernstein on the creation of the Granada cinema circuit, including the Tooting Granada.

Crewe's last project, jointly with Henry G. Kay was the Regal, Kennington Road (opened 17 November 1937) by the Arthur O'Connor circuit. Designed as split theatre-cinema, the Edwardian Kennington Empire would have been in decline by the time of building.

== After death ==
After World War II, many theatres that were not destroyed by bombing were in the way of redevelopment. The building boom of 1885 to 1915 was matched between 1950 and 1975 by theatre demolition. In that 25-year period, 35 theatres were demolished in Greater London alone.

Crewe's reputation has been re-established over the last 20 years. In 2004, the Palace Theatre, Redditch, (built 1913) completed a £3.7 million facelift. A now rare example of Edwardian theatre, it was successful in bidding for a Heritage Lottery Fund grant. Experts believe the Grade II-listed theatre is one of only six examples that can be fully attributed to Bertie Crewe.

== Theatres ==
Theatre	Location	Build date	Original seating capacity	Screens	Status	Notes
Royal Court Theatre	London	1888	642			As sub to Walter Emden. Next to the Metropolitan railway station (now Sloane Square tube). Reconstructed in 1952 and 1980. An unimpressive auditorium, whose sight-lines could be improved, is the strangely antique setting for modern drama that generally preaches change
Theatre Royal	Lincoln	1889	475		Refurbished	Reopened after refurbishment 2010
Olympic	London	1890			Demolished	With W.G.R. Sprague
Theatre Royal	Aldershot	16 February 1891	700		Demolished 1959	With W. G. R. Sprague
Euston Theatre of Varieties	Euston	26 December 1900	1,310		Demolished 1960	With Wylson & Long. In use as a Cinema from the mid-1930s to 1950, then renamed the Regent Theatre
Sadler's Wells	London	1901			Fifth theatre demolished 1996	Remodelled
Liverpool Royal Hippodrome	Liverpool	1902	4,000		Demolished 1984	The first of the Barrasford halls. The ceiling was painted by Secard, depicting flying cupids upon beds of clouds. From 1931 to 1967 it was a cinema
Hippodrome	Brighton	1902	2,000		Alterations	Frank Matcham converted a skating rink into a circus in 1901. When Thomas Barrasford bought the Hippodrome in October 1902 he called in Crewe to replace the circus ring with raked stalls seating, add boxes where the animal entrances has been and extend the apron with a new orchestra pit in front
Lyceum	London	1904	2,000		New Auditorium	Built behind Samuel Beazley's original facade and portico
Pavilion	Glasgow	1904	1.499			Now renovated, the theatre is a remarkable original survivor as a commercial theatre. Built for Tom Barrasford.
Palace	Gorbals, Glasgow	1904	2,000		Demolished 1976	Cine-variety from 1914, sold to H Maitles. Bingo from 1962
Theatre Royal	Bury St Edmunds	1906			Alterations	Designed by William Wilkins it opened on 11 October 1819. Redesigned by Crewe in 1906. Greene King purchased the freehold in 1920, but closed in 1925 and used as a barrel store. Air Vice-Marshal Stanley Vincent raised over £37,000 to restore and re-open the Theatre Royal in 1965, and leased to the National Trust in 1975 on a 999-year lease
Sheffield Hippodrome	Sheffield	23 December 1907			Demolished 1963	One of several large Hippodromes opened by Tom Barrasford in direct opposition to Oswald Stoll, then managing director of Moss Theatres
Royal Hippodrome	Belfast	1907	1,156		Demolished, now the site of the modern extension of the Grand Opera House, Belfast and Fitzwilliam Hotel	Became cinema in 1935, Odeon in 1961, and New Victoria Cinema in 1974. Bingo Hall in approx 1987 with occasional theatre use. Closed 1988. Demolished 1997
Nottingham Hippodrome	Nottingham	28 September 1908				The last Hippodrome to be erected by Thomas Barrasford
Hippodrome	Plymouth	1908			Destroyed by bombing and fire in 1941	Remains purchased in May 1958 by Plymouth Council for £4,000, building demolished
Oldham Palace	Oldham, Greater Manchester	1908	2,380		Demolished	Built for Walter de Frece, his wife Vesta Tilley performed on the opening night, and in 1915 it played host to the only pantomime undertaken by Gracie Fields. Converted to the Odeon Cinema in 1936, it became a three screen in 1974. Unsuccessful in this format, it closed the same year, and remained closed until demolition in 1983. Now the site of a council social services building
Hoxton Hall	London	1909			Internal Alterations	Built 1863 by James Mortimer, now an Arts Centre
Kingston Empire	Kingston upon Thames	1910			Converted to a pub and offices in 1956	With C J Bourne. Converted to a cinema in 1930, with Neon lighting was introduced to light the dome, the second theatre in the country to do this (the first being the London Coliseum) Sister theatre to Aldershot Hippodrome.
Shaftesbury	London	26 December 1911			changed to the Shaftesbury in 1963	Originally Prince's, it opened with the play The Three Musketeers
London Opera House / Stoll	London	1911	2,660		Demolished 1958, became site for an office block.	Designed for Oscar Hammerstein in 1912, sold to London Opera House Ltd (a newly formed company) in 1913, transformed into a cinema by Oswald Stoll in 1916. A smaller theatre, The Royalty, built nearby opened 1960. Renamed The Peacock Theatre it presented the Paul Raymond revues. Today the Peacock is owned by the London School of Economics, it is a lecture theatre by day and home of Sadler's Wells' West End programme by night.
Empire Burnley	Burnley	1911	1,200		Auditorium reconstructed	Built 1894 under G.B. Rawcliffe. Converted to a cinema in 1938, now a Gala Bingo
The Hippodrome	Aldershot	3 February 1913	1,000		Demolished 1961	Partly refurbished, it reopened fitfully until about 1960
Golders Green Hippodrome	Golders Green	1913	3,000		Sold, controversially, to El Shaddai International Christian Centre.	Former home of the BBC Concert Orchestra
The Holme	Regent's Park	1911	Private House			First villa to be erected in Regent's Park. Designed in 1816–18 by Decimus Burton aged 18 for his father, James Burton. Further wings were added in 1911 by Bertie Crewe. More alterations were carried out in 1935
Palace Theatre	Manchester	1913	1,955		Auditorium Reconstructed. Now leased to Ambassador Theatre Group	Built in 1891 by Alfred Darbyshire & F B Smith as the Manchester Palace of Varietie. The first computerised box office system in Europe was installed. Owned by the Palace Theatre Trust
Palace	Redditch	1913	399		£3.6M refurbishment and extension	Relatively small, it was used as a Bingo Hall from 1954 to 1971. Purchased by the council, converted to a theatre
Coliseum Theatre	Dublin	1915	3,000		Destroyed in the Easter Rising of 1916	With R.F. Bergin
Théâtre Mogador	Paris	1919	1,800		Since the nineties the Théâtre Mogador is also used as a concert hall	1913 Sir Alfred Butt leased an area in Paris. Built after World War I in the year 1919. The inauguration guests include President Wilson, in France to negotiate the Treaty of Versailles
Birmingham Hippodrome	Birmingham	1899	1,817		Internal Changes	Originally the Tower of Varieties and Circus, it is still a theatre as the Birmingham Theatre
Piccadilly Theatre	London	1928	1,400			With Edward A. Stone as a private theatre for Edward Laurillard. Interior decoration by Marc-Henri Levy and Gaston Laverdet
Phoenix	London	1930				Designed with Giles Gilbert Scott and Cecil Masey, with Theodore Komisarjevsky as Art Director. Hosted the opening production of Noël Coward's Private Lives, starring Coward, Gertrude Lawrence, Laurence Olivier and Adrienne Allen
Saville	Covent Garden	1931	1,426		Converted to a twin screen cinema in 1970, now a quad screen	With Leslie Scott Slaughter. Builders were Messers Gee, Walker and Slater and it was designed by architects T. P. Bennett & Son. Leased by Brian Epstein in the 60s and is where The Beatles filmed the videos of "Hello, Goodbye". Jimi Hendrix, Fats Domino, The Bee Gees, The Who, Pink Floyd, Gerry & The Pacemakers, Elton John, Chuck Berry, Harry Secombe and Leonard Rossiter
New Bedford Theatre	Camden	1898		1	Demolished	Closed 1950
Capitol Cinema	Southgate, London	1935		1	Demolished September 1982	Odeon opened on 16 October 1935 with Edward G. Robinson in "Passport to Fame"
Century Cinema	Kings Cross	1900		1	Demolished	Closed on 4 April 1968 with David McCallum in "The Heroin Gang" and Deborah Kerr in "Eye of the Devil". Purchased by Camden Council, an extension to the Town Hall was built on the site
Southend Hippodrome / Gaumont Cinema	Southend-on-Sea	1909		1	Demolished 1958	Converted into a cinema in 1933, modernised in 1956 and demolished two years later, a supermarket was subsequently built on the site
Olympia Theatre	Shoreditch	1889	2,170	1	Demolished 1939	Assisted by W.G.R. Sprague
Victoria Theatre	Salford	1900	3,000	1	For sale by Palatial Leisure Limited	Grade II listed, a bingo hall from 1973, closed 2008
Regal Cinema	Kennington	1932	2,000	1	Presently boarded up, it is to be converted to flats, 2006	With Henry G. Kay, consultant for Duchy of Cornwall estate: Louis de Soissons. Probably Crewe's last project - he died the year it opened. Converted to a cinema in 1961

== Notes ==
- Heathcote, Edwin (2001). Theatre London: an architectural guide. London: Ellipsis. ISBN 9781841660479.
