= The Empire Theatre, Burnley =

Building in Burnley, Lancashire, England

- Burnley Empire
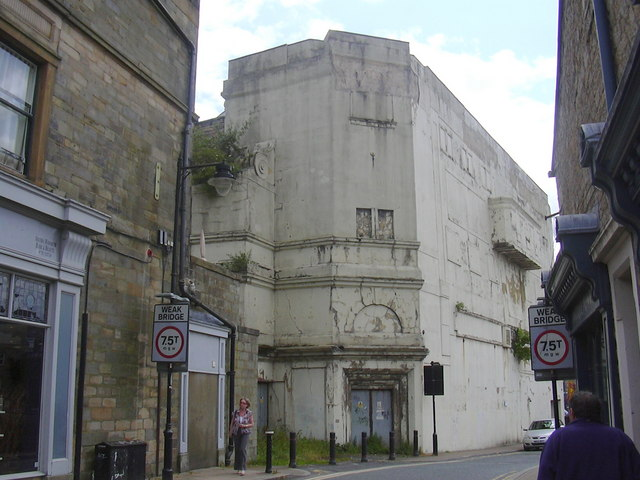
- Empire Theatre, Burnley
- Interactive map of The Empire Theatre, Burnley
- Former names: Empire Music Hall
- Address: Cow Lane; Burnley, BB111NN; United Kingdom
- Owner: Burnley Empire Trust
- Designation: Grade II listed
- Current use: In Need of Restoration

Construction
- Opened: 1894; 132 years ago
- Closed: 1995
- Rebuilt: 1911 Bertie Crewe
- Architect: 1894 George Birkbeck Rawcliffe - 1911 Bertie Crewe

Website
- burnleyempiretrust.co.uk

The Empire Theatre, built in 1894 and also known as the Burnley Empire, is a Grade II listed building located in Burnley, Lancashire. Built on the site of a former spinning mill, it is currently dilapidated but owned and managed by Burnley Empire Trust.

It is currently the last surviving purpose-built theatre/variety hall in Lancashire's northern cotton towns and has been on the Theatre Trust's at risk register since it was created in 2006.

== History ==
=== Opening scene ===
The Empire Theatre was opened as a variety hall by local stationer William Horner (1841–1922) who also ran the nearby Victoria Opera House. It was designed by local architect George Birkbeck Rawcliffe with an innovative dual staircase, described by the local Burnley Express newspaper, as a "double helix."

=== Act II ===
The theatre was extensively rebuilt in 1911 by celebrated London architect William Robert ‘Bertie’ Crewe, who was responsible for the design of the Paris Alhambra & the Shaftsbury Theatre and would go on to renovate the Palace Theatre in Manchester. It had a rather impressive capacity of 2,100 and featured richly formed plasterwork in the classical style which is still a principal feature of interest.

=== Final curtain ===
From 1938 to 1970 the building was used as a cinema.

The theatre eventually became a bingo hall and closed for the final time in 1995.

=== Encore ===
The Burnley Empire Trust, initially Burnley Empire Limited, was formed in 2018 to purchase the Empire Theatre from the Duchy of Lancaster after it was deemed to be "Bona Vacantia". With support from the Theatres Trust, National Trust & Theatresearch they initially set about stabilisation works. After securing grants they commissioned various viability studies to idenitify the work needed to restore the theatre to its former glory.

== Notable appearances ==
The world famous escapologist Harry Houdini staged a breakout from the local police cells on 9 December 1902 to advertise his show at the Empire. His show ran for six nights and he was noted to have escaped from three sets of bracelets on the stage.

A young unknown Charlie Chaplin was discovered at the Empire before he moved to Hollywood.

Margot Fonteyn and Gracie Fields have also trodden the boards.

In February 2024, local band the Milltown Brothers visited the Empire for a promotional photo & video shoot to support the theatre.
