= New Theatre Royal Lincoln =

Coordinates: 53.23056°N 0.53919°W

New Theatre Royal, Lincoln
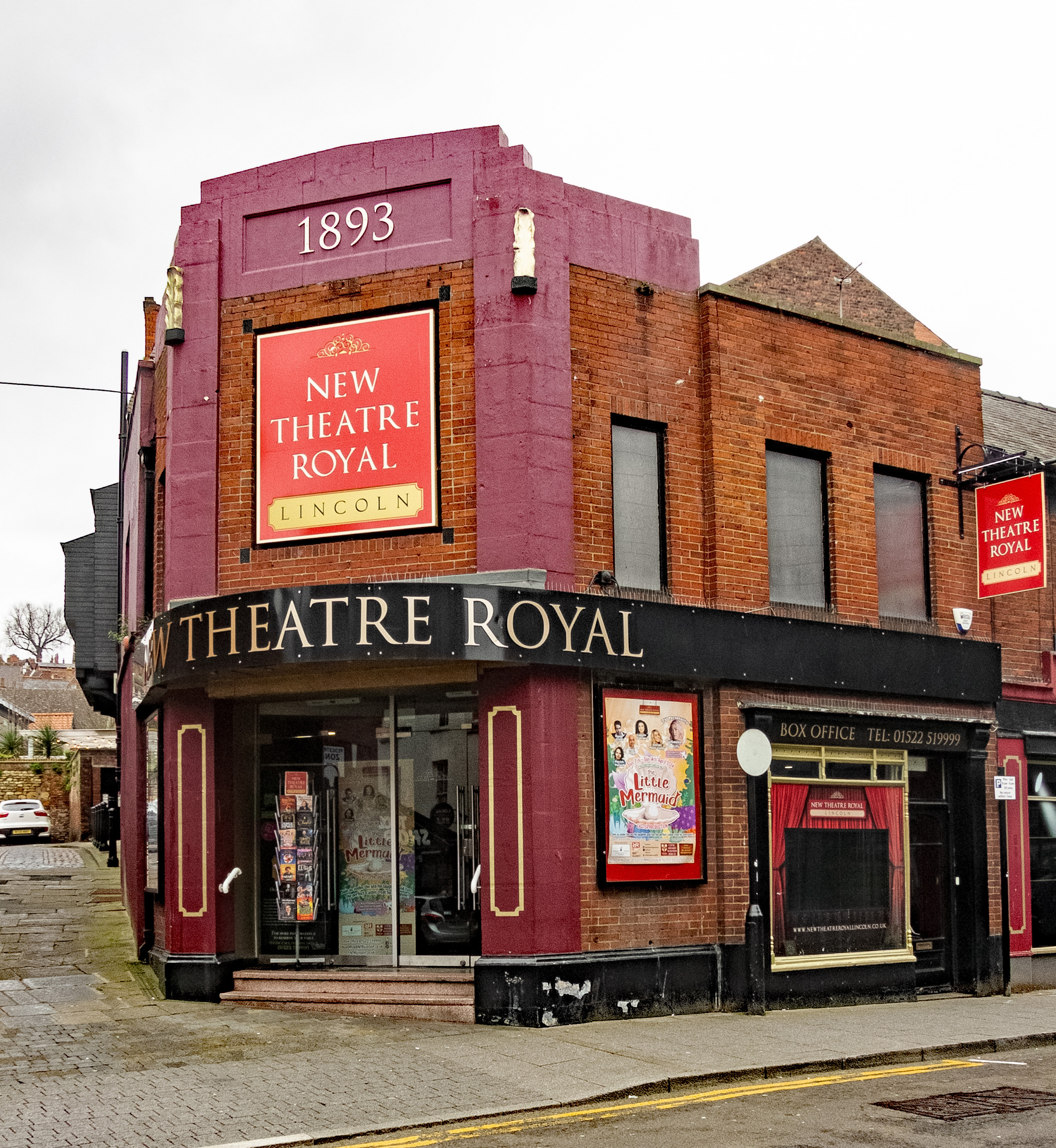
- Interactive map of New Theatre Royal, Lincoln
- Address: Clasketgate; Lincoln; England
- Capacity: 475
- Type: Receiving house
- Designation: Grade II

Construction
- Opened: 1893
- Architects: Bertie Crewe and W. G. R. Sprague

Website
- http://www.newtheatreroyallincoln.co.uk/

The New Theatre Royal Lincoln is a theatre in Lincoln, Lincolnshire, England.

The present theatre, initially called the New Theatre Royal, was built in 1893 to the designs of Bertie Crewe and W. G. R. Sprague. After an explosion and fire in 1892 had destroyed the previous Theatre Royal on the site, built in 1806. The 1806 theatre was, in turn, a rebuild of an earlier theatre of 1764 on Butchery Street, now called Clasketgate. The structure of the building remained the same until 1907, when the present frontage, foyer, and lounge were added, spinning the orientation of the entrance to face Clasketgate. A 2010 refurbishment of public non-auditorium space restructured and modernised the foyer and bar areas. The building is Grade II listed.

The New Theatre Royal Lincoln was renamed to the Theatre Royal Lincoln and then later changed back the New Theatre Royal Lincoln in 2016 when the theatre was taken over and refurbished after the previous management folded.

From 1893 to 1954 the theatre was run by a succession of leaseholders and managers presenting popular plays, musicals, music hall stars and film. In 1954 it became a weekly repertory theatre under the Lincoln Theatre Association until bankruptcy in 1976, after which it was taken over by Paul Elliot Entertainments in association with Chris Moreno. Under Elliot it became a producing house for its own shows, and a design and production facility for various UK theatre pantomimes, national tours and cruise-ship shows, and a continuing venue for amateur dramatic companies. Chris Moreno became sole manager and lessee in 1993.

In 2009 the local authority, Lincoln City Council, withdrew its ongoing subsidy which led to a threat of closure, and to scrutiny of how council funding had been used. Bids from amateur dramatic, church and community groups, and local entertainment businesses to take-over the theatre's lease were unsuccessful. The theatre survived and was taken over by ID Productions, using it as a base for its touring shows. Theatre Royal's professional theatre offer is now largely as a receiving house for UK theatre tours and musical acts.

During the Second World War, The Theatre Royal was popular with RAF personnel within the county, particularly Guy Gibson.

Sir Patrick Stewart’s debut as a professional actor, as Morgan in Treasure Island, was at the Theatre Royal.

During September 2002, author and former politician Jeffrey Archer, while serving part of his gaol sentence at North Sea Camp prison, worked backstage at the theatre.

In November and December 2003, Theatre of Dreams, a series of four fly-on-the-wall documentaries built around profiles of four employees at the Theatre Royal, was aired on BBC2.

In 2009, reality TV personality Jade Goody played the 'Wicked Witch' in Snow White and the Seven Dwarfs, but had to pull out through illness.

On 18 March 2011, Lord Chancellor Kenneth Clarke visited the theatre as part of the campaign in the May 2011 referendum on the Alternative Vote (AV) system in UK parliamentary elections.
