= Golders Green Hippodrome =

Theatre in London

Coordinates: 51°34′19″N 0°11′36″W

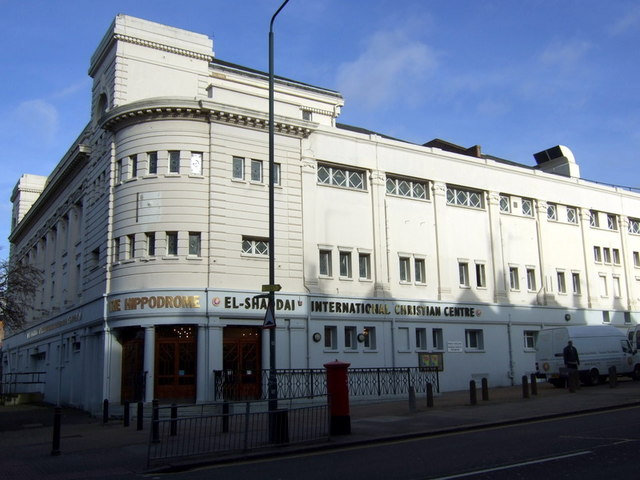
- The Golders Green Hippodrome in 2008, when it was used as a Christian church.
- Alternative names: Hillsong Church North London

General information
- Type: Megachurch
- Location: Golders Green, North End Rd; NW11 7RP, London, United Kingdom
- Year built: 1913
- Client: Hillsong Church

Design and construction
- Architect: Bertie Crewe

The Golders Green Hippodrome was built in 1913 by Bertie Crewe as a 3,000-seat music hall, to serve North London and the new London Underground Northern line expansion into Golders Green in the London Borough of Barnet, London, England.

Taken over by the BBC in the 1960s as a television studio, it has been put to more recent use as a radio studio and multi-purpose concert venue. In 2007, it became an evangelical church building. In 2017 it was acquired by Markaz El Tathgheef El Eslami (Centre for Islamic Enlightening). It was to be converted into an Islamic centre, but residents objected, and Barnet Council deferred a decision.

In October 2021, Hillsong Church bought the Hippodrome, with the intention of holding Sunday services there.

== History ==
The Grade II listed Hippodrome Theatre building next to Golders Green Underground station was built as a 3,000-seat music hall by Bertie Crewe, and opened on Boxing Day 1913.

Its capacity was reduced by half with the construction of a full theatre stage, and it began to be used for pre- and post-London tours. It has been used as a receiving venue for West End transfers, with Laurence Olivier, Marlene Dietrich, Stephane Grappelli, Arthur Askey, Charlie Chester, Django Reinhardt and Chico Marx appearing there. Donald Swann's Wild Thyme played in 1955, and its regular performances included an annual pantomime and Ralph Reader's Gang Show.

After the Streatham Hill Theatre opened in 1929, the two venues operated as sister-theatres, with shows appearing at both as part of their tours.

Touring opera was still popular at the time, and pre-war performances included the British National Opera Company and post-war in 1952 with the D'Oyly Carte Opera Company and a filmed production of The Mikado in 1966. The theatre appeared in an early British sexploitation nudist film called Naked as Nature Intended (1961) directed by Harrison Marks and starring Pamela Green. Charlie Girl premiered at the Hippodrome on 27 November 1965 before transferring to the Royal Adelphi on 15 December. It starred Anna Neagle, Joe Brown and Derek Nimmo.

=== BBC radio studio and concert hall ===
In 1969, the BBC were looking for additional television studio capacity to cope with the introduction of colour transmissions. They took out a long leasehold on the Hippodrome to 2060. In 1969, the Hippodrome was converted into a radio studio and concert hall with reduced capacity of 700 seats, as the BBC had been looking for a north London venue, and became home for the BBC Concert Orchestra, and also saw broadcasts and concerts from the BBC Big Band and BBC Radio Orchestra.

From May 1972 until December 1973, Radio 2's Jazz Club was recorded in the theatre. The move from the programme's previous venue at the BBC Camden Theatre in Mornington Crescent, London, was announced on air by Humphrey Lyttelton in a 22 May 1972 broadcast.

As a concert venue, it was used in various configurations for:

- Light music concerts – including Maria Friedman
- Rock bands – the first were Queen in 1973, Jethro Tull in 1977 and many that followed were for the John Peel show including Gentle Giant, AC/DC, ELO, Barclay James Harvest, The Kinks, UFO, Procol Harum, Roxy Music, Camel and Stiff Little Fingers. A private Christmas concert given by The Jam for members of their fan club in December 1981 was subsequently broadcast by the BBC.
- Theatre – including an early performance by Ian McKellen in a performance of James Saunders play A Scent of Flowers, which became his first West End performance and his first Award
- Boxing – as both a regional and national venue
- Comedy – including performances by Jim Davidson before he won New Faces, two episodes of the first series of Monty Python's Flying Circus in October 1969, The Val Doonican Show, and The Roy Castle Show.

The BBC recorded various radio specials at the Hippodrome, including the famous BBC Sight and Sound concert of January 1978. AC/DC's 27 October 1977 appearance at the Hippodrome for Sight and Sound in Concert was later released on DVD as Live '77.

The BBC also broadcast the weekly radio programme Friday Night Is Music Night from the Hippodrome, a traditional old light entertainment programme which had moved from the Camden Palace Theatre. Presented originally by Robin Boyle and conducted by Sidney Torch, it was presented latterly by Ken Bruce.

However, with a public brief to bring music to all of the people of the UK, and with additional high-quality space available all over London, the BBC announced its intention to leave the building in August 2003. This followed mounting minor repair work, and saw the BBC Concert Orchestra relocate to the Mermaid Theatre in central London, among other places.

In 2003, the BBC left the Grade II listed building vacant and deteriorating, although it was bought by El Shaddai International Christian Centre, an evangelical church.

=== Deterioration ===
After the BBC left the theatre in August 2003, it was left unused and deteriorated considerably, to the extent that, in early 2005, the venue was placed on English Heritage's 'buildings at risk' register, as its future had become so uncertain. Barnet Council was keen for the building to carry on being used as an entertainment venue, and the BBC was given 18 months to sell it as such. However, since no buyer was forthcoming, the local authority allowed it to be sold at auction in September 2006, with the potential for being developed for other uses, for which the BBC had already applied but been turned down.

For planning purposes, the Hippodrome came to be classed as 'D2' under the 'Use Classes Order', and not under sui generis, exclusively as a theatre, as no stage productions had taken place for more than 40 years. The 'D2' class meant that potential buyers could use the theatre for: "Cinemas, Dance and Concert Halls, Sports Halls, Swimming Baths, other Indoor Sports and Leisure Uses."

The theatre's potential fate galvanised a group formed of various interest groups and local newspapers, including Save London's Theatres Campaign, the Theatres Trust, the Hendon Times and the Hampstead & Highgate Express.

=== El Shaddai International Christian Centre ===
In early 2007, the Christian group El Shaddai International Christian Centre purchased the Hippodrome for £5 million, despite local concerns over the group's beliefs and its intentions for the building.

=== Centre for Islamic Enlightening ===
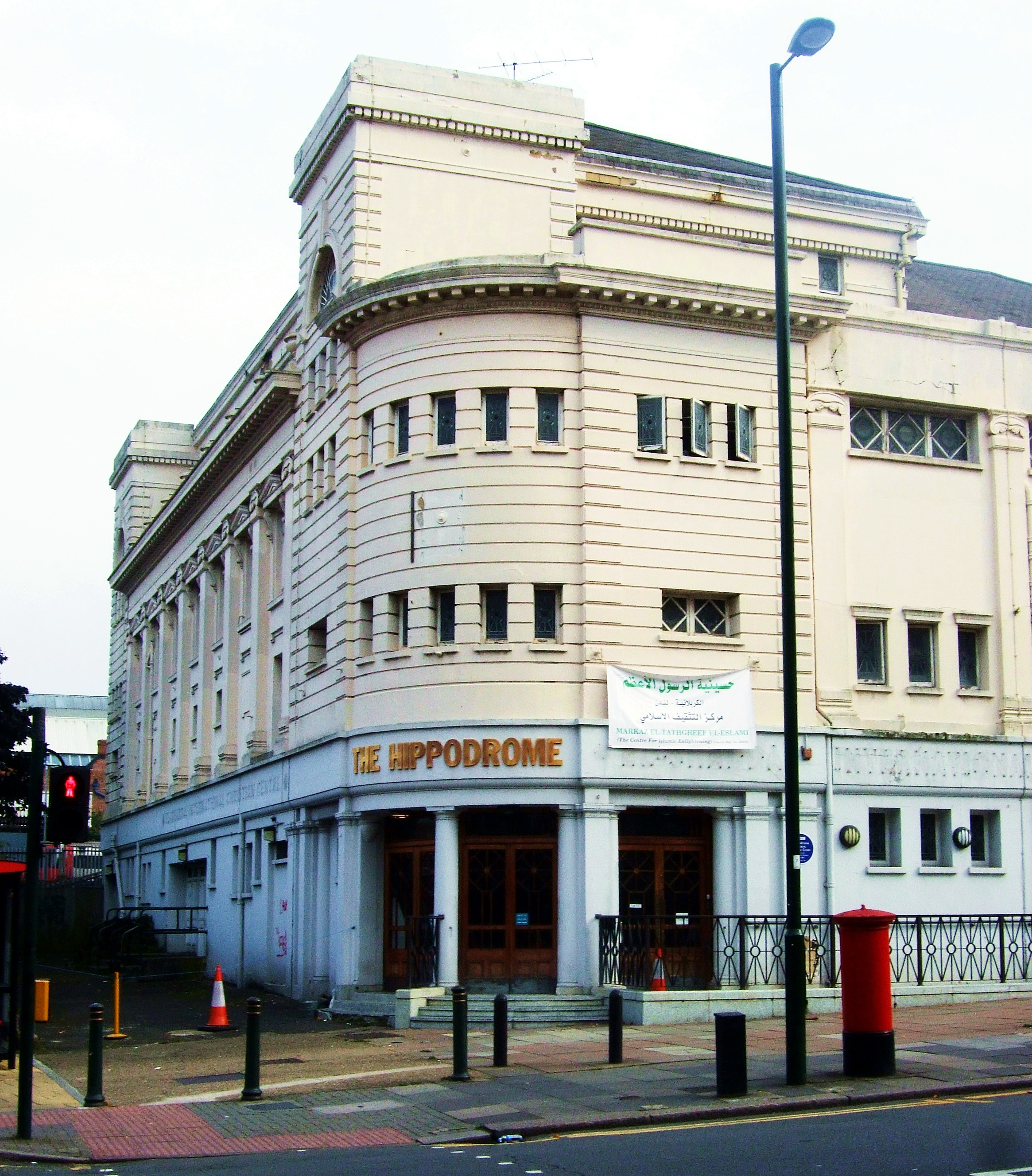
The building in 2017

In 2017, El Shaddai International Christian Centre sold the building and it was bought by the Markaz al-Tathgeef al-Islami (The Centre for Islamic Enlightening), a Shia Islamic centre.

There was a backlash from some members of the local community of Golders Green towards the centre, claiming that the venue should not be granted a 'place of worship' licence. Notably, Alan Jacobs of the Golders Green Residents Environment Group stressed the group's concern around traffic in the area, and a number of other residents wrote open letters. A minority reportedly went further, suggesting that "a Muslim presence in the neighbourhood could be dangerous and was undesirable." Barnet Council received 902 objections and 756 letters in support of the application. Sarah Sackman, acting for MTE, said it was hard to see how it had "not been treated differently to other religious groups who have previously used the building." Upon the sale of the venue, Chair of Barnet Citizens Ed Marsh said: "This is a sad moment for the borough of Barnet and sends the wrong message about the type of warm, welcoming and inclusive place that Barnet is. From the beginning the Markaz have sought to use and preserve an iconic local landmark and have been met with a campaign of smears and lies driven by racism and Islamophobia. The result of this has been a Muslim community who have made a great contribution to our borough for decades being driven out."

=== Vaccination centre ===
In May 2020, the Hippodrome became a pop-up vaccination centre as part of an interfaith drive to promote the COVID-19 vaccine across communities, with faith leaders getting vaccinated themselves.

=== Hillsong Church ===
In 2021, Hillsong Church, an evangelical Christian megachurch, and a Christian association of churches based in Australia bought the venue with no notable objection. Rabbi Josh Levy of North Western Reform Synagogue expressed his disappointment to hear of the sale, saying, "We have greatly valued the relationships we have built with the Markaz and its members over these past years." Alan Jacobs of the Golders Green Residents Environment Group welcomed the Hillsong Church move into the venue, citing that it was "a progressive, diverse and inclusive organisation which recognises the value of working with local communities", adding that "Church use is generally on a Sunday, which Golders Green is better able to cope with", whereas the Islamic centre had applied to be open from 8am until 11.30pm every day.
