= Annemarie Lewis Thomas =

Welsh composer and lyricist

- Born: Swansea, Wales, United Kingdom
- Education: Middlesex University
- Occupations: Composer; Lyricist; Musical theatre director
- Musical career
- Genres: Musical theatre
- Website: AnnemarieLewisThomas

Annemarie Lewis Thomas is a musical director, composer, lyricist. She founded the Musical Theatre Academy (MTA) in 2009, which was named as The Stage's School of the Year in 2012 and 2017.

== Early career ==
Thomas trained at Middlesex Polytechnic, graduating with a BA(Hons) in Performing Arts in 1989.

From 1994 to 2004 she was musical director of fringe theatre company, The Steam Industry with productions including Seven Brides for Seven Brothers, The King & I, The Sound of Music and the UK stage premiere of Calamity Jane, all at Battersea Arts Centre (BAC).

Thomas has been commissioned by British Youth Music Theatre (BYMT) to write several musicals including CCTV, The Open Door, Girl In The Ashes, Great Expectations and Fool’s Gold.

== Composition ==
Thomas has written the music and lyrics for almost 50 musicals including:

Year	Title	Type of work	Performance venues	Notes
1990	The Silent Tramp	Full length musical	Polish Theatre, Hammersmith	
1992	Wizard of Oz	Full length musical	Roses Theatre, Tewkesbury	
1995	Dangerous Nights	Full length musical	Jermyn Street Theatre, London	
2000	The Roaring Girl	Play with songs	Finborough Theatre, London	
2001	Uncle Ebenezer	Full length musical	Various	
2002	Around the World in 80 days	Full length musical	Various	Pub. Samuel French, Inc. Book and lyrics, Phil Willmott.
2002	Man Is Man	Play with songs	Finborough Theatre, London	
2003	The Wolf Boys	Full length musical		Yvonne Arnaud Theatre commission Book and lyrics, Phil Willmott
2007	Black Eyed Susan	Underscore for melodrama	Theatre Royal, Bury St Edmunds	
2010	Dangerous Daughters	Full length musical	The Drill Hall, London	With Nick Stimson
2013	Great Expectations	Full length musical		Book, Gerry Flanagan
2017	Dangerous Daughters	Full length musical	Bridewell Theatre, London	Book, Nick Stimson; Published by Samuel French.
2018	Oh My, Nellie Bly	Full length musical	Bridewell Theatre, London	Book, Nick Stimson; Published by Samuel French.
2020	The Time Machine	Full length musical	Bridewell Theatre, London	Book, Nick Stimson

Thomas also wrote the music and lyrics for the following pantomimes with the book by Daniel O'Brien: Cinderella (2007), Puss in Boots (2008), Jack and the Beanstalk (2009),Aladdin (2013), Beauty and the Beast (2014), Robinson Crusoe (2016), Mother Goose (2017), Robinson Crusoe, Dick Whittington and his Cat (2019), Covidella and the Masked Ball (2020) an online production and Jack and the Beanstalk (2021).

She wrote the music and lyrics for two online films by Nick Stimson: Coming Home (2020) and J (2021).

== Musical direction ==
Since 1989, Thomas has been musical director of over 150 productions, including:

Year	Title	Role	Performance venues	Notes
1994	The Night We Buried Judy Garland	Musical director	Shaw Theatre, London	Director: Phil Wilmott
1996	Ud's Garden	Musical director	Wimbledon Studios, London	
1996	Dick Daredevil	Musical director	Drill Hall, London	Director, Phil Wilmott
2000	The Ultimate Man	Musical director	Bridewell Theatre, London	Director, Paul Tomlinson
2004	Victor/Victoria	Musical director	Bridewell Theatre, London	Director, Phil Wilmots

== Teaching, accompanying and writing ==
Thomas was head of musical theatre at the Hertfordshire Theatre School and a staff member at Middlesex University.

In 2009, she founded the Musical Theatre Academy (The MTA) in Islington, London. It was named The Stage's School of the Year in 2012 and 2017. The MTA closed in September 2022 after it failed to secure financial backing.

As an accompanist, Thomas has worked with Maria Friedman, Liz Robertson, Patti Boulaye, Rachel Tucker, Mari Wilson, Diane Langton and Peter Polycarpou, amongst others.

Thomas wrote for The Reviews Hub for several years. In 2015, she created her own blog which evolved into a vlogging channel on YouTube. She writes for Backstage.com and has staffed their Office Hours forum on occasion. She has also contributed articles to The Stage, Backstage.com and Drama & Theatre.

In March 2015, together with Angie Peake a dual-registered nurse practitioner and therapist. Thomas organised the first conference for UK drama schools to discuss mental health in the arts which resulted in the #time4change Mental Health Charter. Launched by Mark Shenton in The Stage in July 2016, by December of the same year 115 major arts organizations had signed up.
