= Palace Theatre, Manchester =

Theatre in Manchester, England

Coordinates: 53°28′30″N 2°14′27″W

Palace Theatre
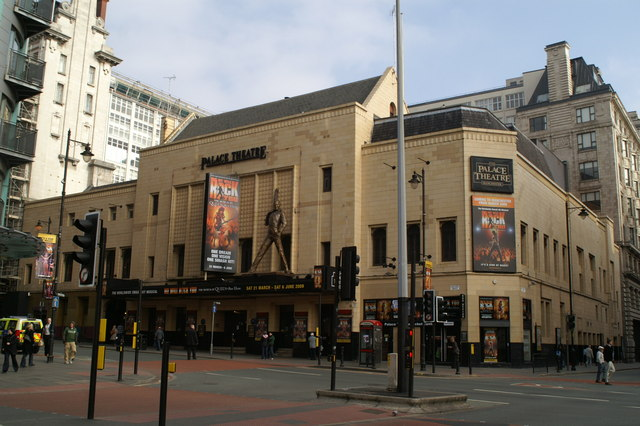
- Address: 97 Oxford Street; Manchester; England
- Owner: ATG Entertainment as a CIO
- Capacity: 1,955 (seated)
- Type: Receiving house

Construction
- Opened: 18 May 1891; 135 years ago
- Renovated: 1896 (redecorated and altered) by Frank Matcham; 1913 (interior) by Bertie Crewe
- Years active: 1891–present
- Architect: Alfred Darbyshire

Website
- Official website

Listed Building – Grade II
- Official name: The Palace Theatre
- Designated: 8 June 1977
- Reference no.: 1271227

The Palace Theatre is one of the main theatres in Manchester, England. It is situated on Oxford Street, on the north-east corner of the intersection with Whitworth Street. The Palace and its sister theatre the Opera House on Quay Street are both operated by parent company, ATG Entertainment. The original capacity of 3,675 has been reduced to its current 1,955.

== History ==
The theatre, originally known as "the Grand Old Lady of Oxford Street", opened on 18 May 1891, having been designed by the architect Alfred Darbyshire at a cost of £40,500. The Palace Theatre was redecorated and altered in 1896 to the designs of the renowned theatre architect Frank Matcham, and he again worked on some improvements to the theatre in 1899, when he was commissioned to put in a pass door so that the manager did not have to go outside in the rain and snow to reach backstage, and at the same time he also proposed to carry out some minor alterations and to redecorate the theatre. The interior of the theatre was renovated by Bertie Crewe in 1913; the renovation took seven months and the theatre reopened with a reduced seating capacity of 2,600. In September 1940, the theatre took a direct hit from a German bomb during the Manchester Blitz.

In the 1970s, audience numbers declined, as they did in many live venues, and the theatre was threatened with closure. It was designated a Grade II listed building on 8 June 1977. The Arts Council supported it in the 1980s, and after major internal refurbishment and an enlarged stage facility, it was run by a charitable trust, Norwest Holdings. It was subsequently sold to Ambassador Theatre Group in 2009. In March 2020, the theatre acquired Charitable Incorporated Organisation (CIO) status along with the Opera House.

It is one of the largest and best equipped theatres outside London. It hosts major touring musicals often with major celebrities and performances of opera and ballet, along with various other comedy acts and one night concerts.

=== Royal Opera House, Manchester ===
In 2008 the Royal Opera House and Manchester City Council began planning a new development known as Royal Opera House, Manchester. The proposal would have seen the Palace Theatre refurbished, to create a theatre capable of staging productions by both the Royal Ballet and Royal Opera. It was intended that the Royal Opera House would take residence of the theatre for an annual 18-week season, staging 16 performances by the Royal Opera, 28 performances by the Royal Ballet and other small-scale productions. A year later, The Lowry sent an open letter to the then Secretary of State for Culture, Olympics, Media and Sport, Ben Bradshaw, Arts Council England, Manchester City Council and the ROH, calling for the scheme in its current form to be scrapped, but the two venues reached an amicable settlement later the same year. In 2010 it was announced that the project was being shelved as part of larger arts-funding cuts.

== Productions ==
The opening presentation, to a capacity audience, was the ballet Cleopatra; however its initial presentations failed to gain popular support and for several years it struggled to make a profit. Only when it broadened its scope to include more popular performers was it a resounding success. During the early part of the 20th century it came into its own, with artists such as Danny Kaye, Gracie Fields, Charles Laughton, Judy Garland, Noël Coward and Laurel and Hardy making appearances.

Continuing a long tradition of tour openings in Manchester, the hit Broadway and West End musical The Producers opened at the theatre in February 2007 for a run until May, when it continued on tour around the UK. Peter Kay starred as Roger Debris for the Manchester dates.

Other shows to have played successful seasons at the Palace Theatre include the regional premiere of Les Misérables, which ran for 13 months from 1992 to 1993, the regional premiere of Miss Saigon in 2001, Chitty Chitty Bang Bang in 2006, and Mamma Mia! over the 2006/07 Christmas season. Broadway musical The Wedding Singer had its UK premiere at the theatre in 2008, and in December 2008 to March 2009 the theatre hosted a season of the UK tour of Mary Poppins, one of only six theatres in the country to accommodate the tour, both events further cementing the theatre's reputation as the flagship venue of the North of England. In July 2009, during the Manchester International Festival, the theatre, in association with Opera North, staged the world première of Rufus Wainwright's opera Prima Donna.

In the summer of 2019, The Book of Mormon UK tour opened at the Palace Theatre, marking the first time the show had been performed in the UK outside of London's West End. The show opened on 6 June 2019, and ran until 24 August.

On 11 November 2023, the first UK and Ireland tour of Hamilton opened at the Palace Theatre for a 15-week season until 24 February 2024.

== See also ==
- Listed buildings in Manchester-M1
- Opera House
- Live Nation deal – Ambassador Theatre Group's acquisition of venues previously owned by Live Nation UK
