= W. G. R. Sprague =

Australian theatre architect

- Born: William George Robert Sprague; 1865; Dunedin, New Zealand
- Died: 4 December 1933 (aged 68); Maidenhead, England
- Occupation: Theatre architect
- Notable work: 35 theatres, including the Aldwych, Ambassadors, St Martin's, Noël Coward, Novello, Sondheim and Wyndham's

William George Robert Sprague (1865 – 4 December 1933) was a theatre architect. He was apprenticed to Frank Matcham, and later established his own practice, designing at least thirty-five theatres between 1890 and 1929. Of his surviving London theatres, eleven are Listed – officially designated as of particular architectural or historic interest deserving special protection. Ten are listed in the basic category, Grade II, and one – Wyndham's is in the middle category, Grade II*.

The two substantially intact Sprague theatres outside London are the Lyceum, Sheffield, which is Grade II* Listed, and the Théâtre Édouard VII, Paris, designated a Monument historique.

== Life and career ==
Sprague was born in Dunedin, New Zealand, in 1865, the son of an English actress, Dolores Drummond, and her husband, William Drummond Sprague, a law clerk. (Note: Sprague senior is recorded in some official records as William Alonzo Spragg.) The couple were based in Melbourne, Australia, where Drummond had a successful career, sometimes using the stage name Dolly Green. After her husband died she moved to London with the young Sprague and his four sisters in the latter part of the 1870s.

Both in Australia and after moving to England, Sprague was a friend and protégé of the actor-manager Charles Wilmot, who was instrumental in securing for him an apprenticeship to Frank Matcham, the leading theatre architect of the time. Sprague remained with Matcham between the ages of sixteen and twenty, and was then articled to Walter Emden for three years.

He was in a partnership with Bertie Crewe until 1895. According to a 1982 study of Britain's old theatres, once he set up on his own, Sprague, "well trained in the practicalities of theatre architecture, but uninhibited by the pedantries of an academic education", designed numerous theatres including some that remain as "the most elegant smaller houses of the West End". Unlike Matcham and Emden, Sprague studied architectural forms and conventions and used his knowledge in his designs, saying of himself that he "liked the Italian Renaissance" as a style for his frontages, but would take liberties when needed "to get the best effects". He told an interviewer in 1897 that in his view there was nothing more foolish than to make a theatre too large:

For a populous district of working folk, where melodrama at cheap prices is to be done, a vast theatre is suitable. In a "genteel" suburb such a house would frequently be half empty, and the fatal atmosphere of depression would be created. For such a locality a small, elegant theatre, always seeming prosperous, is the thing.

Sprague often had to convince his clients that traditional theatre layouts of three or four tiers did not in reality accommodate a larger audience than his preferred two-tier auditorium: "Used with a proper ingenuity the two tiers can be made to accommodate the same number of people as three tiers, making them ever so much more comfortable and dividing the classes of playgoers quite as effectually". Sprague hated obstructive pillars in the construction of a theatre, and considered it the responsibility of the architect to ensure that every occupant of a seat had a clear view of the entire stage. The theatrical newspaper The Era commented in 1902:

Mr Sprague has made a feature of building theatres without columns, and consequently works greatly on the cantilever system. the chief strength of the circles is maintained by a specially designed bow-shaped girder, which spreads like a spider's web. This makes the ugly and interfering columns quite unnecessary. The advantage, too, of this principle is that it takes up very little room in the construction of tiers, and gives the greatest possible benefit to the sight lines. The old-fashioned shape of the dress and upper circles are no longer tolerated, and the use of the curve is almost brought to perfection.

Sprague married twice. His first marriage was in November 1890 to Mary Jane Beer; they had a daughter, Maud. They divorced in 1898 and in April 1900 he married Isabella Katherine Bennett; they had a daughter and two sons. Sprague died from heart failure at his home in Maidenhead on 4 December 1933, aged 68.

== Theatres ==
In London, except where stated. Of Sprague's surviving theatres, thirteen are Listed – officially designated as of particular architectural or historic interest deserving special protection. Eleven are listed in the lowest category, Grade II, and two – the Lyceum, Sheffield and Wyndham's, London are in the middle category, Grade II*.

Date	Theatre	Capacity	Notes
1890	Olympic Theatre, London (with Bertie Crewe)	3,000	Demolished 1905
1891	Theatre Royal, Aldershot (with Crewe)	700	Demolished
1893	Theatre Royal, Lincoln (with Crewe)	475	Exterior rebuilt in 1945. (Interior survives and is Listed Grade II)
1894	Camberwell Metropole (with Crewe)	2,200	Demolished 1937
1896	Shakespeare, Battersea	3,000	Demolished 1956
1897	Grand, Fulham	2,239	Demolished 1958
1897	Lyceum, Sheffield	3,000	Listed, Grade II*
1897	Lyceum, Newport	1,250	Demolished
1898	Coronet, Notting Hill Gate	1,143	Listed, Grade II
1899	Wyndham's	759	Listed, Grade II*
1899	Terriss Theatre, Rotherhithe (later called Rotherhithe Hippodrome)	2,087	Demolished 1955
1899	Holloway Empire	1,210	Demolished mid-1970s
1899	Princess of Wales's Theatre, Kennington	1,347	Demolished 1949
1899	Empire Palace of Varieties, Stratford	2,000	Demolished
1899	Royal Duchess, Balham	1,200	Demolished 1960s
1899	Empire, Bradford	2,000	Demolished 1980s
1900	Camden Theatre (now called Koko)	2,434	Listed, Grade II
1900	Euston Palace of Varieties (later called the Regent)	1,380	Demolished 1968
1902	King's, Hammersmith	3,000	Demolished 1965
1902	New, London (later called the Albery and then the Noël Coward Theatre)	1,250	Listed, Grade II
1902	Royal Artillery, Woolwich	1,000	Demolished 1956
1905	Hicks Theatre (now the Aldwych Theatre)	1,092	Listed, Grade II
1905	Waldorf (later the Strand; now called the Novello Theatre)	1,146	Listed, Grade II
1906	Globe (now called the Gielgud Theatre)	1,000	Listed, Grade II
1907	Queen's (now called the Sondheim Theatre)	1,120	Listed, Grade II
1907	Palace, Reading	1,460	Demolished 1961
1908	Grand Opera House, Norwich (later called the Hippodrome)	1,836	Demolished 1966
1908	New, Oxford	1,200	Demolished and replaced 1933
1910	Kilburn Empire (later called the Broadway)	1,913	Mainly rebuilt in 1970s; fragmentary remains of Sprague's work
1912	New, Northampton	2,300	Demolished 1950
1913	Ambassadors	490	Listed, Grade II
1913	Théâtre Édouard VII, Paris	800	Monument historique
1915	Penge Empire	1,500	Demolished 1960
1916	St Martin's	600	Listed, Grade II
1929	Streatham Hill Theatre	3,000	Listed, Grade II

Source: Mackintosh and Sell, and Arthur Lloyd website.

== Gallery ==
Camberwell Metropole
(1894)

Royal Duchess, Balham
(1899)

Camden Theatre
(1900 – now Koko music venue)

Waldorf
(1905 – now the Novello Theatre)

Hicks Theatre – now the Aldwych Theatre – 1905

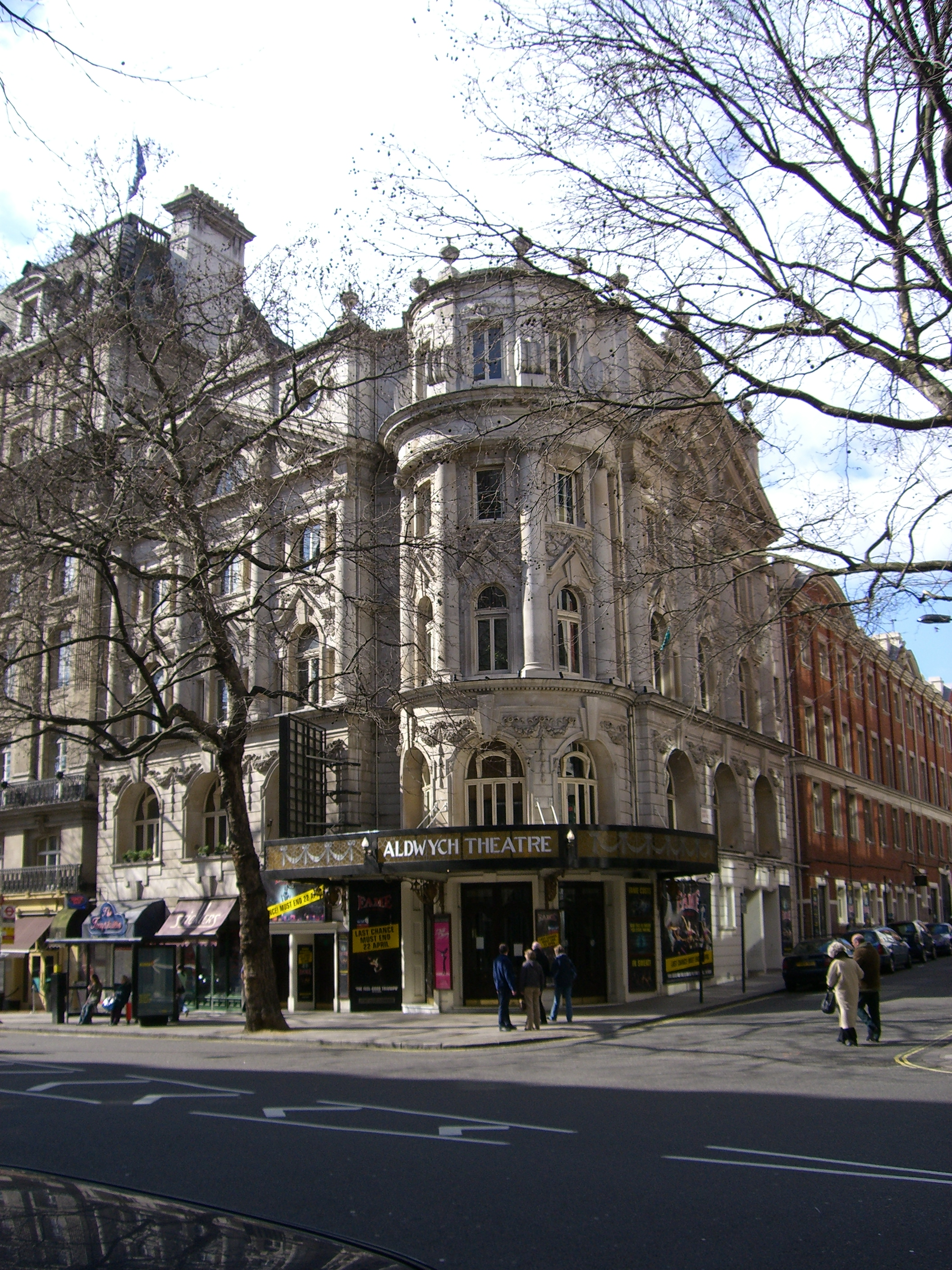
Aldwych Theatre in 2006

== Notes, references and sources ==
=== Sources ===
- Earl, John (2005). British Theatres and Music Halls. Princes Risborough: Shire. ISBN 0-74-780627-6.
- Mackintosh, Iain; Michael Sell, eds. (1982). Curtains!!!, or, A New Life for Old Theatres. Eastbourne: John Offord. ISBN 0-90-393142-7.
