= Streatham Hill Theatre =

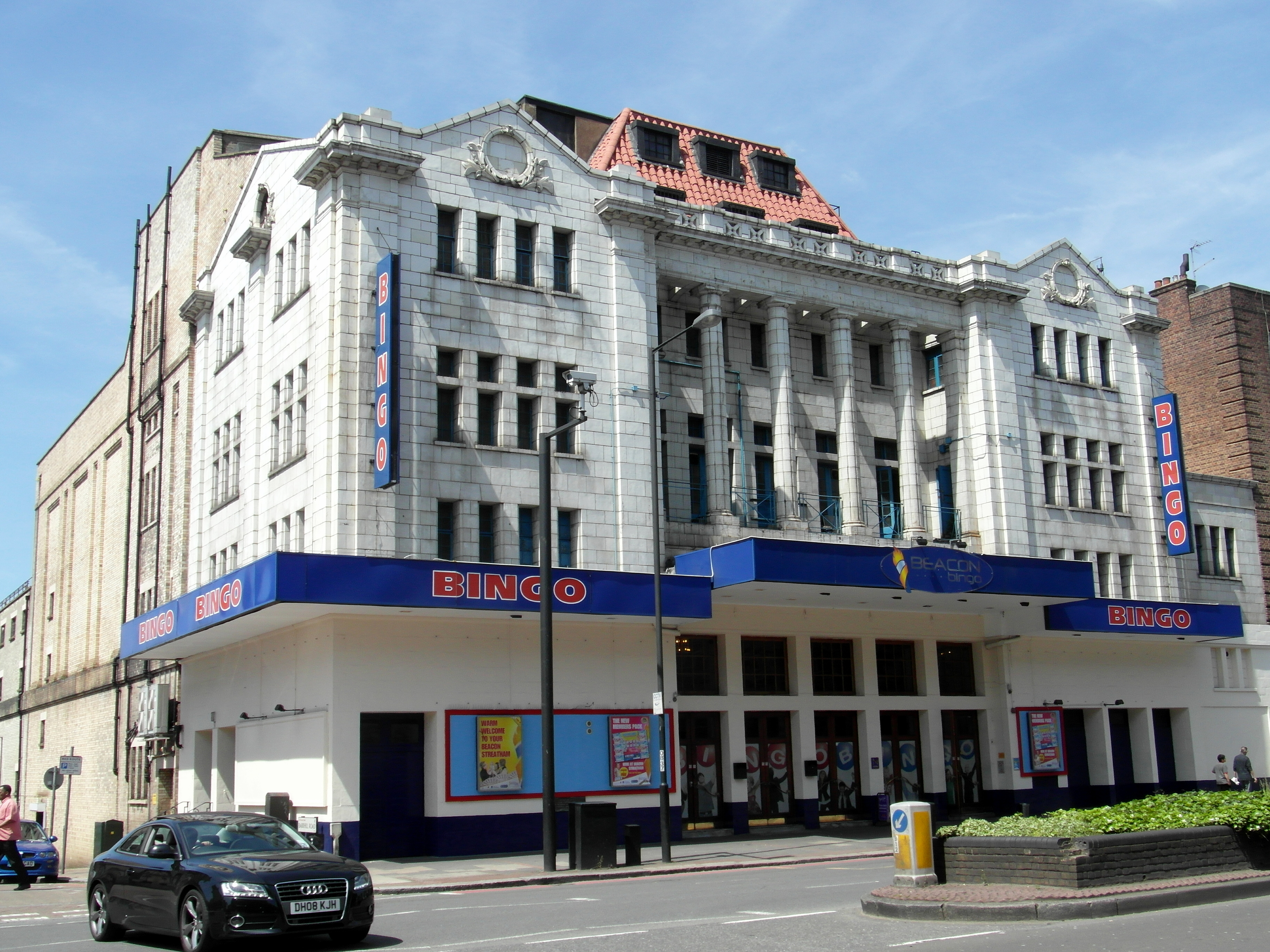
- Interactive map of Streatham Hill Theatre
- Location: London Borough of Lambeth
- Coordinates: 51.4405°N 0.1259°W

Website
- Official website

Streatham Hill Theatre is a historic theatre in Lambeth, England. It was built in 1928–29 and was the last theatre designed by W. G. R. Sprague.

Opening in 1929, it staged theatre, opera, ballet and variety until 1962, apart from a period between 1944 and 1950 when it was closed due to bomb damage. The venue operated as a sister-theatre to Golders Green Hippodrome.

In 1962 it closed to theatre, reopening as a Mecca bingo hall. Bingo continued under several operators until 2017.

It was Grade II listed in 1994 as "an unusually lavish example of a theatre built in the short-lived revival of building in 1929–30; as a suburban example of this date the building may be unique."

The building was added to the Theatre's Trust Theatres at Risk register in 2018.

Also in 2018, London Borough of Lambeth granted Asset of Community Value status to the theatre, renewing it in 2023.

Since 2018, the building remains out of use, apart from a small slot machine lounge, and there is a campaign to save the theatre for the community, led by the Friends of Streatham Hill Theatre.

In 2021, Historic England added the theatre to its Heritage at Risk register.

In June 2022, SAVE Britain's Heritage added the theatre to its Buildings at Risk register.

In 2022, the building's freehold was sold twice, first in May to a property company, then in July to a large church, who are intending to relocate from their current premises in Brixton slot machine operation continues behind part of the foyer, but the rest of the building was left empty until the church opened for services on 30th June 2024.
