= Theatre Royal, Bury St Edmunds =

Regency theatre in Bury St. Edmunds, Suffolk, England

Theatre Royal
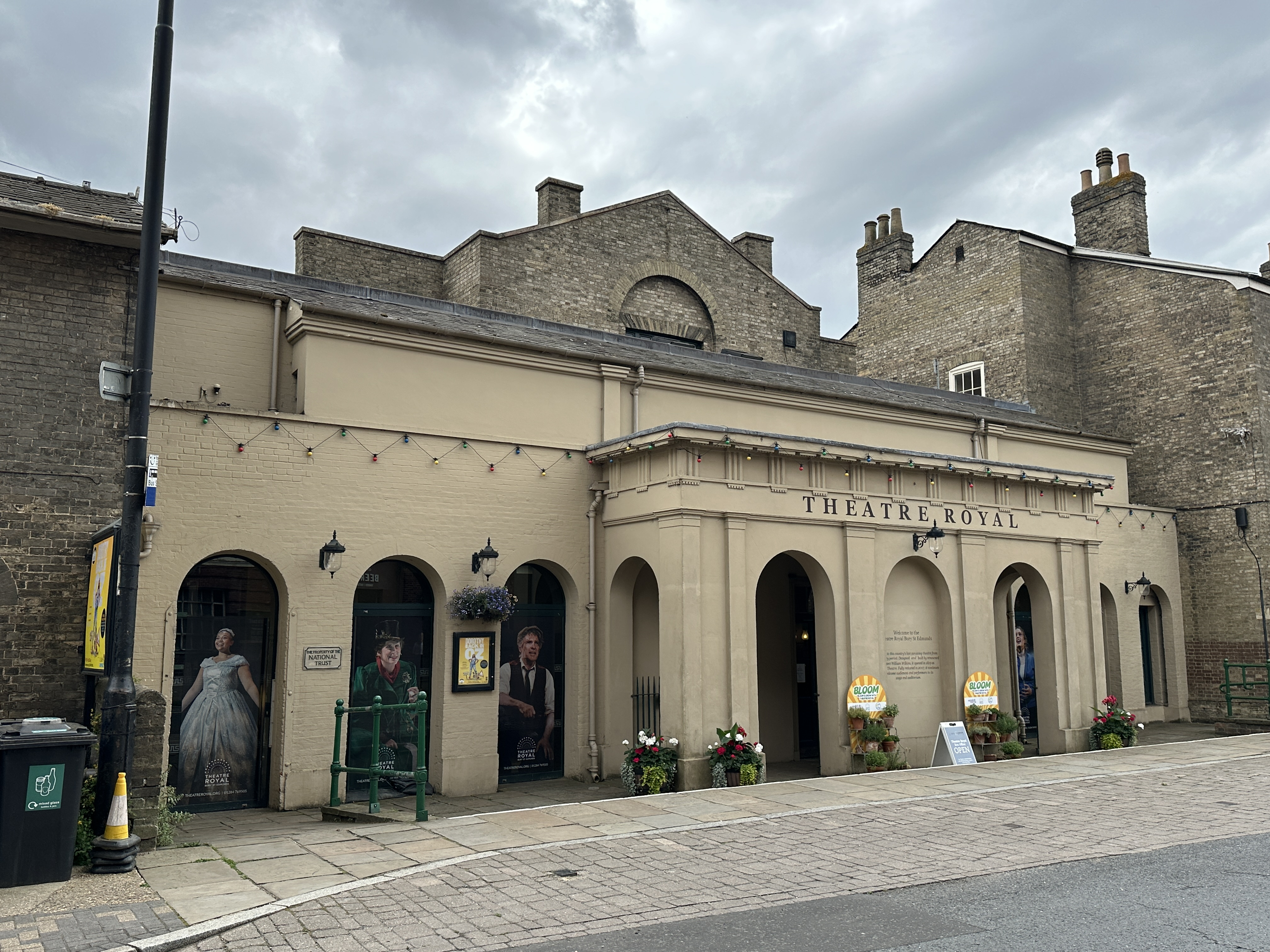
- Theatre Royal, Bury St Edmunds exterior
- Interactive map of Theatre Royal
- Address: Westgate Street; Bury St Edmunds; England
- Coordinates: 52.2406°N 0.7172°E
- Owner: Greene King
- Capacity: 360
- Designation: Listed Building Grade I
- Current use: Theatre

Construction
- Opened: 1819
- Renovated: 2005 -2007
- Architect: William Wilkins

Website
- http://www.theatreroyal.org/

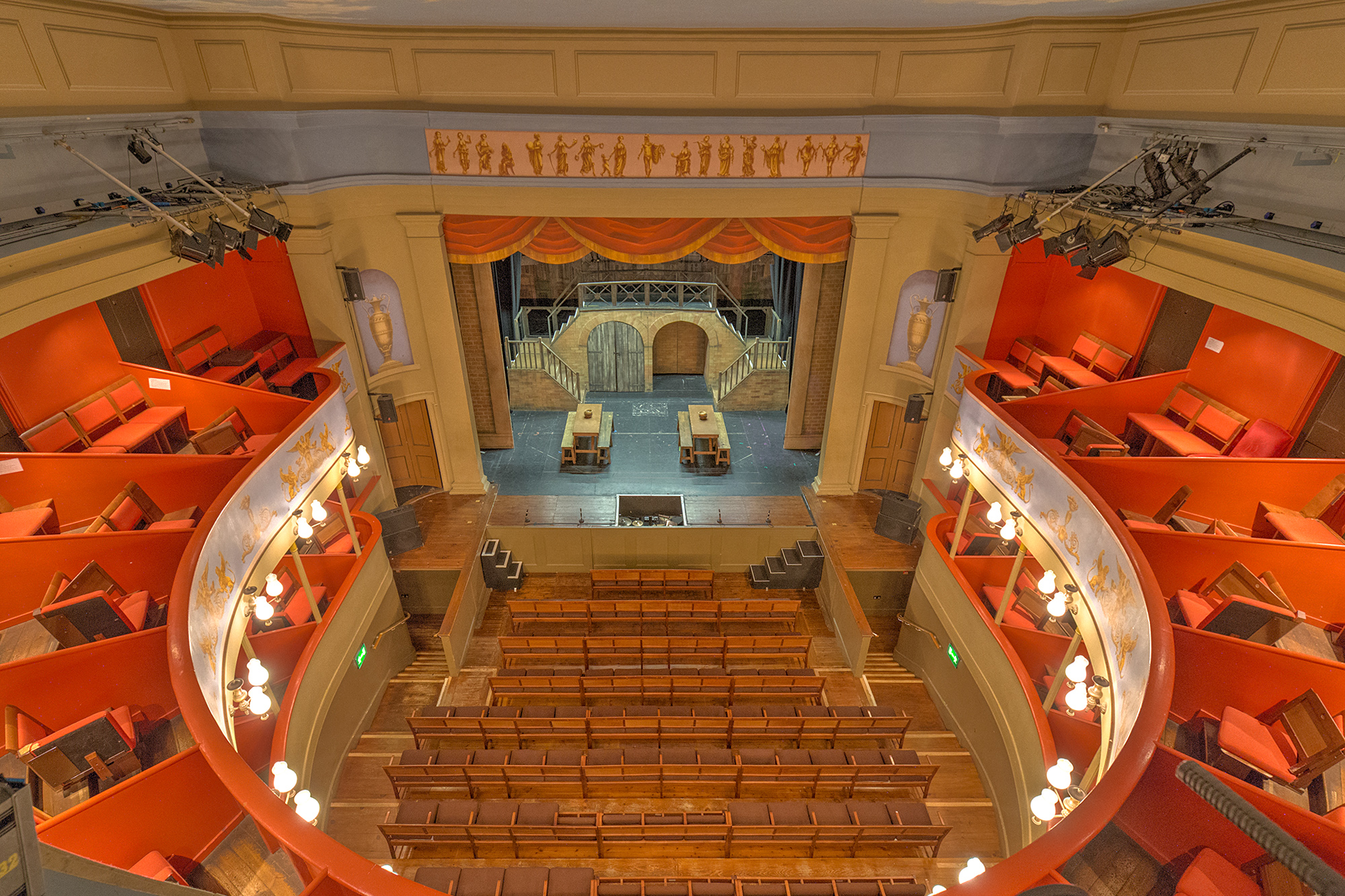
Interior of the Theatre Royal

The Theatre Royal, formerly the New Theatre, is a restored Regency theatre in Bury St. Edmunds, Suffolk, England. The building is one of eight Grade I listed theatres in the United Kingdom, and is the only working theatre operated under the auspices of the National Trust. It is considered to be one of the most perfect examples of Regency theatres in Britain.

The theatre presents a diverse programme of drama, music and stand-up comedy. It regularly produces its own work which tours nationally, recent productions include Torben Bett's Invincible in the summer of 2016 and, in early 2017, an adaptation of Jane Austen's Northanger Abbey.

The Theatre Royal is currently a member of the pioneering Black Theatre Live partnership, a consortium of eight UK theatres committed to effecting change nationally for BAME touring through a three-year programme of national touring, structural support and audience development.

== History ==
=== The New Theatre ===
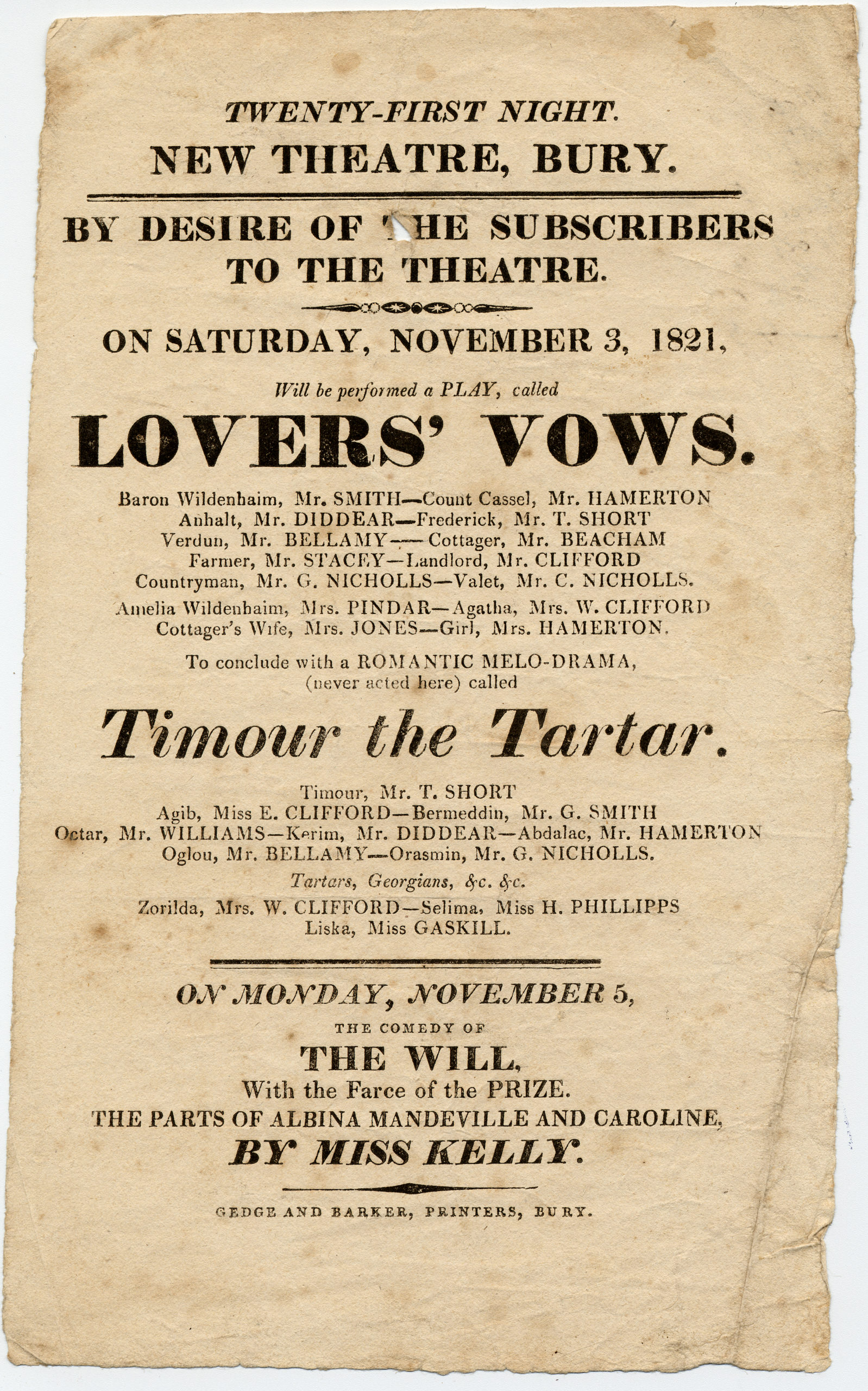
Playbill, 1821

The Theatre Royal was opened by its proprietor and architect William Wilkins on 11 October 1819 as the "New Theatre". It was one of the most sophisticated and up-to-date playhouses of its age. It has survived, without significant alteration into our time and it is now one of only three buildings to give the experience of theatre-going in pre-Victorian Britain.

Wilkins was an architect of national repute, responsible for, amongst other buildings, the National Gallery in London and Downing College, Cambridge. As the proprietor of the Norwich Theatre Circuit, he employed a small company of players to undertake an annual tour of six theatres: Yarmouth, Ipswich, Cambridge, Bury St Edmunds, Colchester and King's Lynn. Each was open for just one or two short seasons during the year. The Bury theatre opened for the Great Fair in early October to mid-November and was only available for special events at other times of the year. At that time, it would certainly have enjoyed large audiences particularly as the local community would not have been able to travel far for entertainment, until the arrival of the railway in the 1840s.

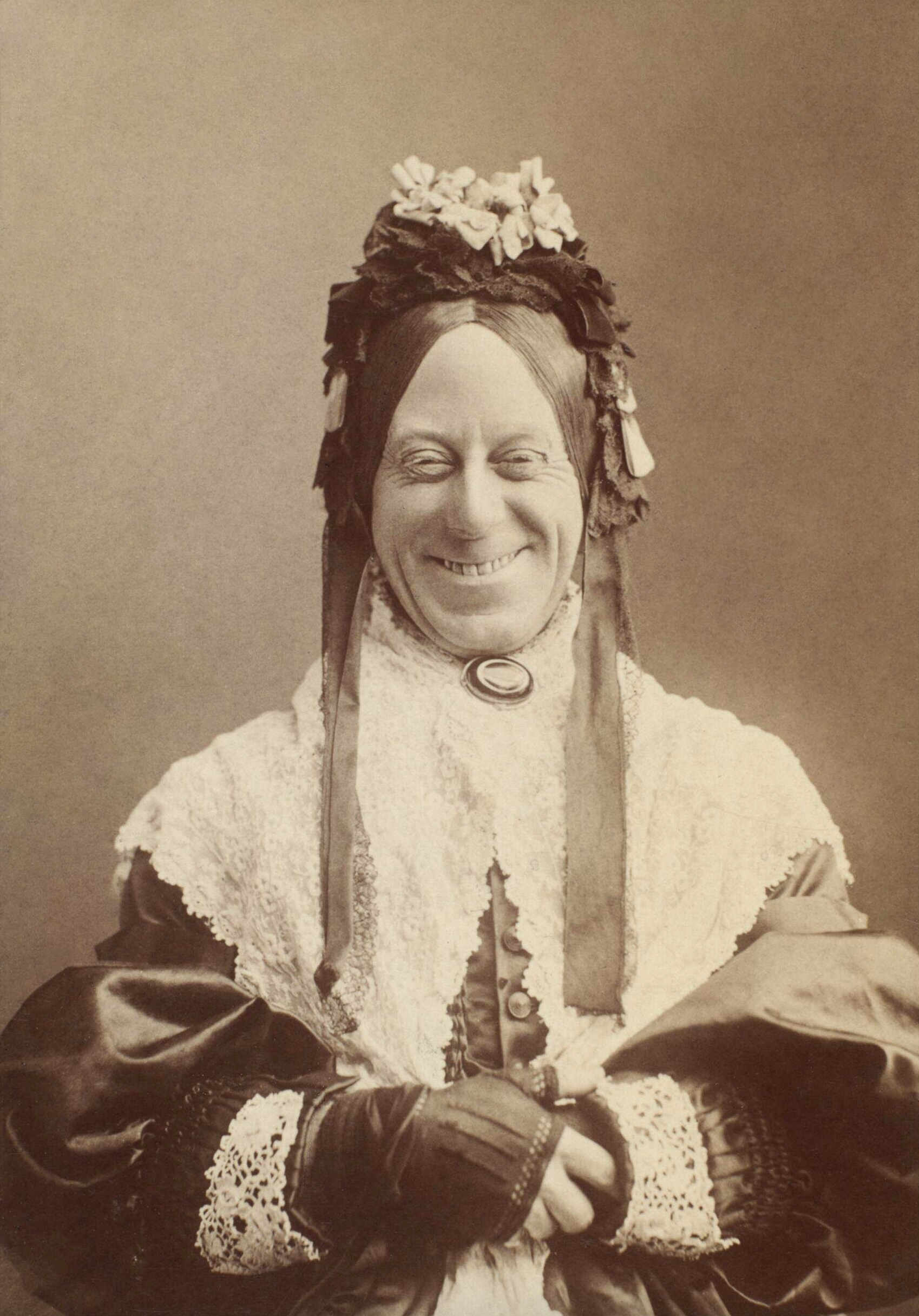
W. S. Penley as the first Charley's Aunt, Donna Lucia d'Alvadorez, performed at the Theatre Royal, Bury St Edmunds, in 1892.

The Norwich comedians were disbanded in 1843 and at Bury there followed more than half a century of economic difficulty. This was alleviated briefly in 1892 when the world premiere of Charley's Aunt was staged at the theatre. The theatre closed in 1903 but was reopened in 1906 when renovations to the building were made by the architect Bertie Crewe.

Greene King, the local brewery, purchased the freehold, which it still owns, in 1920. However, in 1925, in the face of overwhelming competition from two new cinemas, the theatre closed once more. Greene King had struggled to keep the theatre operating and was content to use the building as a barrel store. So it remained until the 1960s when a group of local people led by Air Vice Marshal Stanley Vincent raised over £37,000 to restore and re-open the theatre in 1965. The building was vested in the National Trust in 1975 on a 999-year lease. The Theatre Royal is now managed as an independent working theatre by the Bury St Edmunds Theatre Management Limited.

=== 2000s restoration ===
In September 2005 the Theatre was closed to begin a £5.3million restoration project to restore the building to its original 1819 configuration and decorative scheme. Architect Levitt Bernstein, in collaboration with theatre staff and the National Trust, drew up plans to restore the historic building to as true to its original design as possible.

Previous restorations to the building had removed the original Georgian entrances to the pit as well as its distinctive Georgian forestage. The boxes had also been removed from the dress circle and the seating layout changed throughout the building.

The project restored these aspects to recreate a theatre which could provide further insight into the architecture, stage techniques and repertoire of the 18th and 19th centuries, of which little is known in comparison to theatre of other periods. In addition to the restoration of the building the theatre's artistic team researched and re-discovered many of the lost texts of the Georgian repertoire.

Under the banner of "Restoring the Repertoire" the Theatre Royal produced some of plays of the Georgian period in the now restored building. On 11 September 2007 the theatre re-opened with a production of the 1829 nautical melodrama, Black-Eyed Susan, written by Douglas Jerrold with music by Annemarie Lewis Thomas.

In addition to the restoration of the main building a new, modern foyer was constructed to the side of the theatre to provide catering facilities, an additional bar and more toilets for the building.
