= Musical Theatre Academy =

The Musical Theatre Academy

Location
- Bernie Grant Arts Centre; Townhall Approach Road; London, N15 4RX; England; 51°32′52″N 0°6′23″W

Information
- Motto: Rigorously Professional
- Established: 2009
- Founder: Annemarie Lewis Thomas
- Specialist: Performing Arts
- Principal/CEO: Annemarie Lewis Thomas
- Gender: Mixed
- Students: 42
- Website: http://www.themta.co.uk/

The Musical Theatre Academy (The MTA) was a drama college based in Islington, London. Founded in 2009, the school closed at the end of the 2021–2022 academic year. The principal, Annemarie Lewis Thomas, announced that students in their final term would still graduate and the other students would be helped to find places in other institutions.

== College History ==
The MTA was opened in 2009 by Annemarie Lewis Thomas. In 2012, it was awarded The Stage Award of School of the Year in 2012, who described the school as "a new force in drama training." In 2017 The MTA was once again named as The Stage School of the Year. This time the citation commended them on the #time4change campaign, whilst acknowledging The MTA's growing influence within the training sector.

The academy was originally based at the Drill Hall (now the RADA Studios), before moving to 89 Holloway Road in 2011. In July 2015 the academy relocated to The Bernie Grant Arts Centre in Tottenham. Students received a guarantee that their fees are spent on training, not on securing a profit, and consequently the academy was granted charitable status in 2012.

== Teaching, productions and policies ==
The course ran over 4 terms per year with 40 hours contact time per week, with classes evenly divided between acting, dancing and singing. All of its staff were working in the theatre whilst teaching. It produced public performances every term – shows included the world premieres of Lia's Guide to Winning The Lottery (by Keren David, Paul Herbet and Andy Kaby), In Touch (by Dougal Irvine), Dangerous Daughters, Celebs Anon, The Sunshine Gang, The Ballad of Kitty Jay, Just the Ticket and The Venus Factor (all by Nick Stimson and Annemarie Lewis Thomas), and Animus (by Webborn and Finn).

The academy was the only UK college to have a policy of supporting new writing in the UK and regularly had composers coming in to work with the students on new material. The MTA saw itself as a college for life, providing graduates with care, support and help. In its first 10 years (2009-2019), 100% of students had secured agent representation prior to graduating.

One of the academy's productions was Something Old, Something New – The Musical Theatre Revue.

== Performances ==
The students (as part of their training) were regularly seen in the West End in professional shows/concerts, and to date its students have backed Shoshana Bean, Patina Miller performed with Katherine Jenkins at the London Palladium, and sung on the album Lift by Craig Adams and Ian Watson. They have also provided the ensemble for the Tommy Gala at the Prince Edward Theatre, the MMD 20th anniversary Gala at the Novello, and Julie Atherton – No Space for Air at the Apollo Theatre. More recently the students have been seen on several episodes of The Last Leg on Channel 4.

Performance History
Date	Performance	Venue	Writer	Music	Director	Choreographer
Mar 2010	Something Old, Something New	The Drill Hall		Annemarie Lewis Thomas		
June 2010	Bad Girls	The Drill Hall	Maureen Chadwick & Ann McManus	Kath Gotts	Simon Greiff	
15–17 Sept 2010	Dangerous Daughters	The Drill Hall	Nick Stimson	Annemarie Lewis Thomas	Nick Stimson	
Dec 2010	Cinderella	The Drill Hall	Daniel O'Brien	Annemarie Lewis Thomas		
16–19 Mar 2011	Something Old, Something New	The Drill Hall	Annemarie Lewis Thomas	Jack Gunn		
15–18 June 2011	Zombie Prom	The Drill Hall	John Dempsey	Dana P Rowe	Helen Evens	
14–17 Sept 2011	Celebs Anon	The Drill Hall	Nick Stimson	Annemarie Lewis Thomas	Pip Minnthorpe	
20–23 Dec 2011	Puss In Boots	Waterloo East	Daniel O'Brien	Annemarie Lewis Thomas	Gerry Flanagan	
14–16 Dec 2011	Don Juan	Waterloo East		n/a	Helen Evans	
14–17 Mar 2012	Something Old, Something New	Bridewell Theatre		Annemarie Lewis Thomas	Jack Gunn	
13–16 June 2012	In Touch	Bridewell Theatre	Dougal Irvine	Dougal Irvine	John Brant	
12–15 Sept 2012	The Sunshine Gang	Bridewell Theatre	Nick Stimson	Annemarie Lewis Thomas	Kate Golledge	
12–15 Dec 2012	Jack & The Beanstalk	Courtyard Theatre, London	Daniel O'Brien	Annemarie Lewis Thomas	Howard Samuels	
13–15 Dec 2012	Electra	Courtyard Theatre, London		n/a	Helen Evens	
13–16 Mar 2013	Something Old, Something New	Bridewell Theatre		Annemarie Lewis Thomas	Jack Gunn	
12–15 June 2013	Lia's Guide To Winning The Lottery	Bridewell Theatre	Keren David	Paul Herbert	Ryan McBryde	
11–14 Sept 2013	The Ballad of Kitty Jay	Bridewell Theatre	Nick Stimson	Annemarie Lewis Thomas	Pip Minnithorpe	
Dec 2013	Jack and the Beanstalk	Courtyard		Annemarie Lewis Thomas	Howard Samuels	
Dec 2013	Ting Tang Mine	Courtyard Theatre			Tilly Vosburgh	
Mar 2014	Something Old, Something New	Bridewell Theatre		Annemarie Lewis Thomas	Jack Gunn	
June 2014	Just So	Bridewell Theatre		Inga Davis-Rutter	Christian Durham	Cressida Carre
10–13 Sept 2014	Just The Ticket	Bridewell Theatre	Nick Stimson	Annemarie Lewis Thomas	Simon Greiff	Carly Hainsby
10–17 Dec 2014	Beauty & the Beast	Bernie Grant Arts Centre	Daniel O'Brien	Annemarie Lewis Thomas	Howard Samuels	Helen Siveter
15–17 Dec 2014	Welcome to Thebes	Bernie Grant Arts Centre		n/a	Tilly Vosburgh	
11–14 Mar 2015	Something Old, Something New	Bridewell Theatre		Annmarie Lewis Thomas	Cressida Carre	
10–13 June 2015	Sunshine On Leith	Bridewell Theatre	Stephen Greenhorn	Mary McAdam	Michael Howcroft	Helen Rymer
9–12 Sept 2015	The Venus Factor	Bridewell Theatre	Nick Stimson	Annemarie Lewis Thomas	Pip Minnithorpe	Carly Hainsby
9–19 Dec 2015	Cinderella	Bernie Grant Arts Centre	Daniel O'Brien	Annemarie Lewis Thomas	Howard Samuels	Cris Penfold
Dec 2015	A State Affair	Bernie Grant Arts Centre		n/a	Paul Foster	
9–12 Mar 2016	Something Old, Something New	Bernie Grant Arts Centre		Annemarie Lewis Thomas	Steve Elias	
8–11 June 2016	Around The World In 80 Days	Bernie Grant Arts Centre	Phil Willmott	Annemarie Lewis Thomas	Racky Plews	
7–10 Sept 2016	Animus	Bridewell Theatre	Michael Webborn & Daniel Finn	Michael Webborn	Christian Durham	Helen Rymer
Dec 2016	"Robinson Crusoe"	Bernie Grant Arts Centre	Daniel O'Brien	Annemarie Lewis Thomas	Howard Samuels	Nicky Griffiths
Dec 2016	"Tess of the D'Urbervilles"	Bernie Grant Arts Centre		n/a	Tilly Vosburgh	
March 2017	"Something Old, Something New"	Bernie Grant Arts Centre		Annemarie Lewis Thomas	Steve Elias	
June 2017	"All Shook Up"	Bernie Grant Arts Centre		Kevin Oliver Jones	Max Reynolds	Heather Douglas
September 2017	"Dangerous Daughters"	Bridewell		Annemarie Lewis Thomas	Racky Plews	
December 2017	"Mother Goose"	Bernie Grant Arts Centre		Annemarie Lewis Thomas	Omar F Okai	
December 2017	"By The Bog Of Cats"	Bernie Grant Arts Centre		N/A	Tilly Vosburgh	
March 2018	"Something Old, Something New"	Bernie Grant Arts Centre		Annemarie Lewis Thomas	Steve Elias	
June 2018	"Seussical"	Pleasance Theatre		Annemarie Lewis Thomas	Cressida Carré	
September 2018	"Oh My, Nellie Bly"	Bridewell		Annemarie Lewis Thomas	Simon Kane	Chris Whittaker
December 2018	"Cinderella"	Tower Theatre (Folkestone)		Annemarie Lewis Thomas	Omar F Okai	
December 2018	"Our Mutual Friend"	Tower Theatre		N/A	Tilly Vosburgh	
March 2019	"Something Old, Something New"	Bridewell		Annemarie Lewis Thomas	Steve Elias	
June 2019	"Calamity Jane"	Bridewell		Annemarie Lewis Thomas	Derek Bond	Lucie Pankhurst
September 2019	"The Sunshine Gang"	Bridewell		Annemarie Lewis Thomas	Simon Greiff	Alec Mann
December 2019	"Dick Whittington"	Tower Theatre (Folkestone)		Annemarie Lewis Thomas	Howard Samuels	Helen Siveter
December 2019	"For The Love of The Nightingale"	Tower Theatre		Tilly Vosburgh		
