= Lyceum Theatre, Sheffield =

Theatre in Sheffield, South Yorkshire, England

Coordinates: 53.380469°N 1.466586°W

Lyceum Theatre
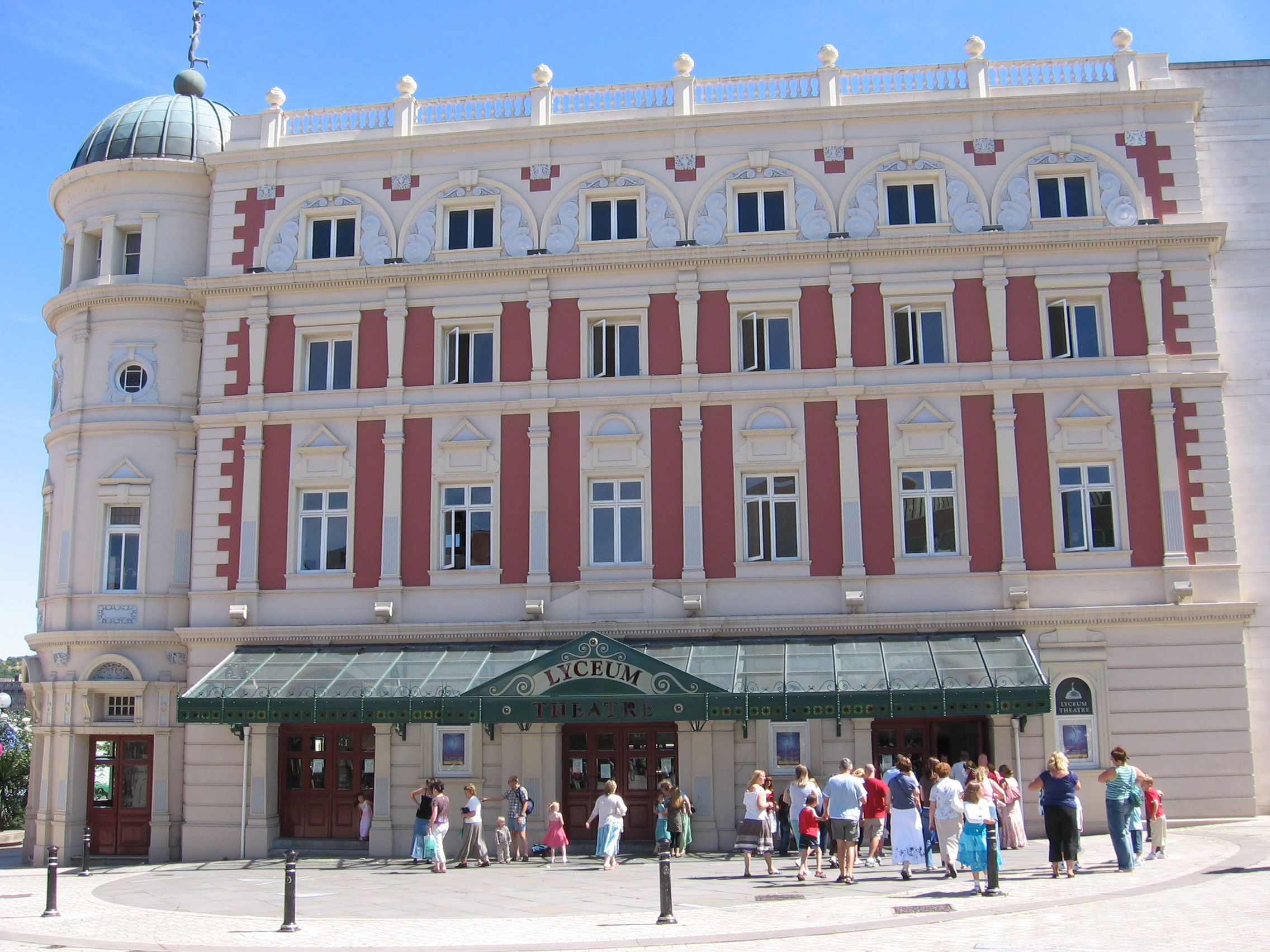
- The Theatre
- Interactive map of Lyceum Theatre
- Address: 55 Norfolk Street; Sheffield; England
- Owner: The Lyceum Theatre Trust
- Capacity: 1,068 (3 levels)
- Type: Proscenium
- Designation: Grade II* listed building
- Public transit: B P Y TT; Castle Square; Arundel Gate Interchange

Construction
- Opened: 1897
- Rebuilt: 1991
- Architect: WGR Sprague

Website
- www.sheffieldtheatres.co.uk

The Lyceum is a 1,068-seat theatre in the City of Sheffield, England.

== History ==
There has been a theatre on the site since 1879 when the Grand Varieties Theatre was built. Made of wood and originally intended to be used as a circus, the theatre was managed by the parents of the music hall comedian Dan Leno in 1883, who regularly performed there in the early stages of his career. Leno's lease came to an end in 1884 and the theatre burnt down in 1893. This was replaced by City Theatre but this was demolished six years later to make way for what is now the Lyceum.

Built to a traditional proscenium arch design, the Lyceum is the only surviving theatre outside London designed by the theatre architect W.G.R. Sprague and the last example of an Edwardian auditorium in Sheffield. The statue on top of the Lyceum Theatre is Mercury, son of Zeus and Maia.

By the late 1950s, the Lyceum was experiencing financial difficulties and by 1966 bingo callers were keeping the rumoured threat of demolition at bay. The theatre closed in 1969 and, despite being granted Grade II listed status in 1972, planning permission was sought for its demolition in 1975. The building was saved in part due to campaigning by the Hallamshire Historic Buildings Society.

Over the years the building changed ownership many times, being used variously as a bingo hall and a rock concert venue. By the 1980s, the interior was in a state of disrepair. The theatre was bought by two Sheffield businessmen in 1985, with financial support from Sheffield City Council, and it was reclassified to Grade II* listed status. Between 1988 and 1990 the Lyceum was completely restored at a cost of £12 million.

The theatre reopened in 1990 and now serves as a venue for touring West End productions, as well as locally produced shows. It is part of the Sheffield Theatres complex with the neighbouring Crucible Theatre and the Tanya Moiseiwitsch Playhouse.

== Home of pantomime ==
The Lyceum presents one of Sheffield's annual Christmas pantomimes. For many years the pantomime attracted prominent actors and variety turns and visiting producers in the months between Christmas Eve and Easter. In the 1940s, the Lyceum began to produce its own pantomime and was soon bringing in stars of radio such as Morecambe and Wise, Harry Secombe and Frankie Howerd.

However, closure of the Lyceum meant that after the final pantomime performance in March 1969, Sheffield's pantomimes took place in the neighbouring Crucible. The pantomime returned to the Lyceum in 1990s, as touring production companies were now using the venue.

In 2007, Sheffield Theatres replaced the touring companies by starting co-production with Evolution Pantomimes. Their first show Cinderella was followed by Aladdin in 2008 and Snow White and the Seven Dwarfs in 2009.

== See also ==
- Sheffield Theatres
- Crucible Theatre
- Crucible Studio

== Notes ==
- Olive, Martin (1994). Norfolk Street, Fitzalan Square. In Images of England: Central Sheffield, pp. 51–64. Stroud: Tempus Publishing Limited. ISBN 0-7524-0011-8
