= Thomas Barrasford =

English entertainment impresario

Thomas Barrasford (1859–1910) was a 19th-century British entrepreneur and entertainment impresario, who operated and built a number of theatres across Britain, mainly under the Barrasford Halls brand.

== Early career ==
Born in South Shields, County Durham, he attended the Royal Scotch Arms pub, and noticed its transformation under his later competitors Moss and Thornton into the Empire Music Hall in 1890. In 1895, in partnership with a man named Varah, Barrasford took over the wooden circus on the Ormond Street, Jarrow, turning it into a music hall, known as the Jarrow Palace of Varieties.

Expanding his empire quickly from 189o, he acquired the Leeds Tivoli theatre, renaming it the Leeds Hippodrome on 20 March 1899. This was his first encounter with fellow impresarios Edward Moss and Sir Oswald Stoll, whose chain had just opened the Leed Empire theatre, whose features and scale had, less than two months later, brought about the failure of the lessor and resultant sale of the Tivoli to Barrasford. Barrasford noticed that fellow impresario Frank MacNaughten in Bradford had countered the opening of the Stoll Bradford Empire in January 1899, by using an idea pioneered by George "Champagne Charlie" Laybourne in 1870 in his Wear music hall, offering a "twice nightly" performance schedule. The formula proved so successful at not only countering the drop in attendance figures normally experienced in existing theatres facing competition from a new Stoll theatre, but actually increased revenues. Barrasford borrowed MacNaughten's Bradford theatre manager to replicate the system in Leeds, with the choice proving so successful and lucrative, that Barrasford moved his home and the operational headquarters of his business to Leeds.

== Rivalry with Sir Edward Moss and Sir Oswald Stoll ==
The form of entertainment contract at the time was called a "tour," whereby an impresario would book an act to tour all of his venues. Barrasford had noticed that Stoll would try to run his theatres cheaply, by booking foreign acts on a one-week trial contract to fill-in for his headline British acts: if they were a success then they got a tour, if not their contract would terminate at the end of the week. Barrasford hence started to attend Stoll's theatres in competition to his on a Monday, and if the act proved a success would then find them and sign them to a tour of his theatres. This skull dugery as far as Stoll was concerned was immoral, and after he banned Barrasford and his employees from the entire Stoll empire, so began a long term battle between the two impresarios.

== Building the tour ==
Barrasford in return set about competing by resolving to build his theatres bigger and better than the Moss and Stoll empires. In 1900 he co-leased the short-lived Tivoli Theatre, Edinburgh and moved to Glasgow, opening three theatres there in 1902–04, including the Glasgow Pavilion. In 1901 he acquired the Birmingham Hippodrome (renamed from the Tower theatre), and then the Alhambra theatre, Kingston upon Hull. In 1902 he acquired the Glasgow Hippodrome, but his most important theatre in his business opened that year, the Bank Holiday opening of the brand new 4,000 seat Bertie Crewe designed Liverpool Royal Hippodrome, with prices at rock bottom. Although the now combined Moss-Stoll consortia already had a theatre in the city, they specifically built the Liverpool Olympia close by. Opened with a production of Tally Ho! direct from the London Hippodrome, it never paid its way thanks to the pulling power of the scale, extravagance and "twice-nightly" format of the Barrasford Hall.

Barrasford followed this success with the 1903 opening of the brand new Newcastle Pavilion in Westgate Road, with a bill topped by Tyneside contralto Madame Belle Cole. Barrasford in competition to Moss-Stoll added two further existing theatres to his tour in Liverpool: the Lyric Theatre in Everton Valley (opened Easter Monday, 1903); and the St Helens Hippodrome (previously the St Helens Empire), which opened with Fred Karno's comedy company in a production of Jail Birds. Barrasford also added the Grand Theatre, Manchester and the Regent Theatre in Salford, neither of which proved financially successful and where hence quickly disposed of.

In 1904, the second new Barrasford Hall opened in Glasgow, the Bertie Crewe designed Glasgow Pavilion on 29 February 1904. Barrasford also expanded south at this time, adding the Bristol Empire and the Brighton Hippodrome. He also took over the lease on the Britannia Theatre, Hoxton, letting Crewe refurbish it, but handed the lease over to Frank MacNaughten after nine months.

The St Helens Hippodrome was the fourteenth music hall added to the Tour in four years, with the empire spanning the following: Palace, Jarrow; Tivoli, Leeds; Tivoli, Edinburgh and Tivoli, Birmingham; Alhambra, Hull; Empire, Bristol; Lyric, Everton; Grand, Manchester, and Regent, Salford. The Britannia Theatre, Hoxton, together with the Hippodromes at Liverpool, Glasgow and Brighton and St. Helens.

Barrasford now expanded the physical footprint of his theatres further afield. Registering Barrasford Circuit as a limited company at Leicester Place, off Leicester Square, London, Barrasford was listed as managing director, and Hugh Astley ex-manager of the London Pavilion as chairman. They then purchased the Newcastle Pavilion, and after the closure of the Hoxton venture, took on Stoll in a direct race to open in the Westend. Barrasford bought the old Lyceum Theatre, just off The Strand, which he commissioned Bertie Crewe to refurbish. Although Stoll's Empire won the opening race (Christmas Eve, 1904), the Lyceum opened on Boxing Day.

But much of Barrasford's financial success had been based on alcohol sales, and London County Council refused a license on principle for the Lyceum. Although the Lyceum attracted royal patronage before the Empire, with the first production of the ballet Excelsior seen by the Prince and Princess of Wales, afterwards King George V and Queen Mary.

By mid-1905, Barrasford Halls were facing a mini-financial crisis. Barrasford, in trying to outpace Stoll and Moss by trialling acts in Europe, had opened Alhambra-themed halls in Brussels and Paris. However, the former lost money, while the Paris paid for itself. and the London Lyceum lost money. With no possibility of a liquor license, Barrasford ended his lease of the Lyceum.

== Consolidation ==
Barrasford moved the centre of his business operations to Brighton. Having turned the ice rink into the Brighton Hippodrome in 1902, he acquired an old music hall in New Road and refurbished it as the Brighton Coliseum. Barrasford himself lived in a converted warehouse next to the Hippodrome, called Hippodrome House.

There now followed a period of consolidation around the business. The Tivoli, Leeds, was refurbished and renamed the New Hippodrome, opening in 1906. The Hull Alhambra was refurbished as the New Hippodrome, but on completion of works the lease was handed to its manager Alfred Graham. The opening of the Coventry Hippodrome on 31 December 1906, also coincided with disposal of the loss-making theatres in Manchester.

On 23 December 1907, the Crewe designed Sheffield Hippodrome opened, followed the following year in the opening of the last Barrasford Hall, the Crewe designed Nottingham Hippodrome, opening on 28 September 1908.

== Other interests ==
Barrasford was an enthusiastic race horse owner, and after becoming a prominent figure at the Jockey Club, inventing the starting device the "Barrasford Gate." On an occasion of being assured that his horse would win at Pontefract Racecourse, he placed a five-shilling bet on behalf of every member of his staff at the Leed's Tivoli. After it won, the performances that night were cancelled at the Tivoli, as the entire staff spent the night celebrating.

== Cinema, and retirement ==
Barrasford was an early adopter of the new moving pictures invention, creating the Barrascope system for cinematograph projection. Holding a patent with Leeds photographer Owen Brooks, with assistance from an engineer named Borland, they first put the machine into the Leeds Tivoli from 1902. He later adapted a number of his theatres to use it, including the Brighton Coliseum in 1909.

By now, Barrasford was suffering from persistent ill health from Bright's Disease, and impresarios in USA and Britain expressed interest in taking over his entire tour. Sir Alfred Butt succeeded, in association with the Orpheum Circuit of America, and developed a new British circuit which rivalled the Moss-Stoll combine. Barrasford died at his home in Brighton on 1 February 1910. His second wife was former music hall singer Maud D'Almayne, with whom he had three sons, all of whom worked in the theatre business. His funeral was one of the largest ever held in Brighton.

== Bibliography ==
- Musgrave, Clifford (1981). Life in Brighton. Rochester: Rochester Press. ISBN 0-571-09285-3.
