= Lyceum Theatre, London =

West End theatre in London

Lyceum Theatre
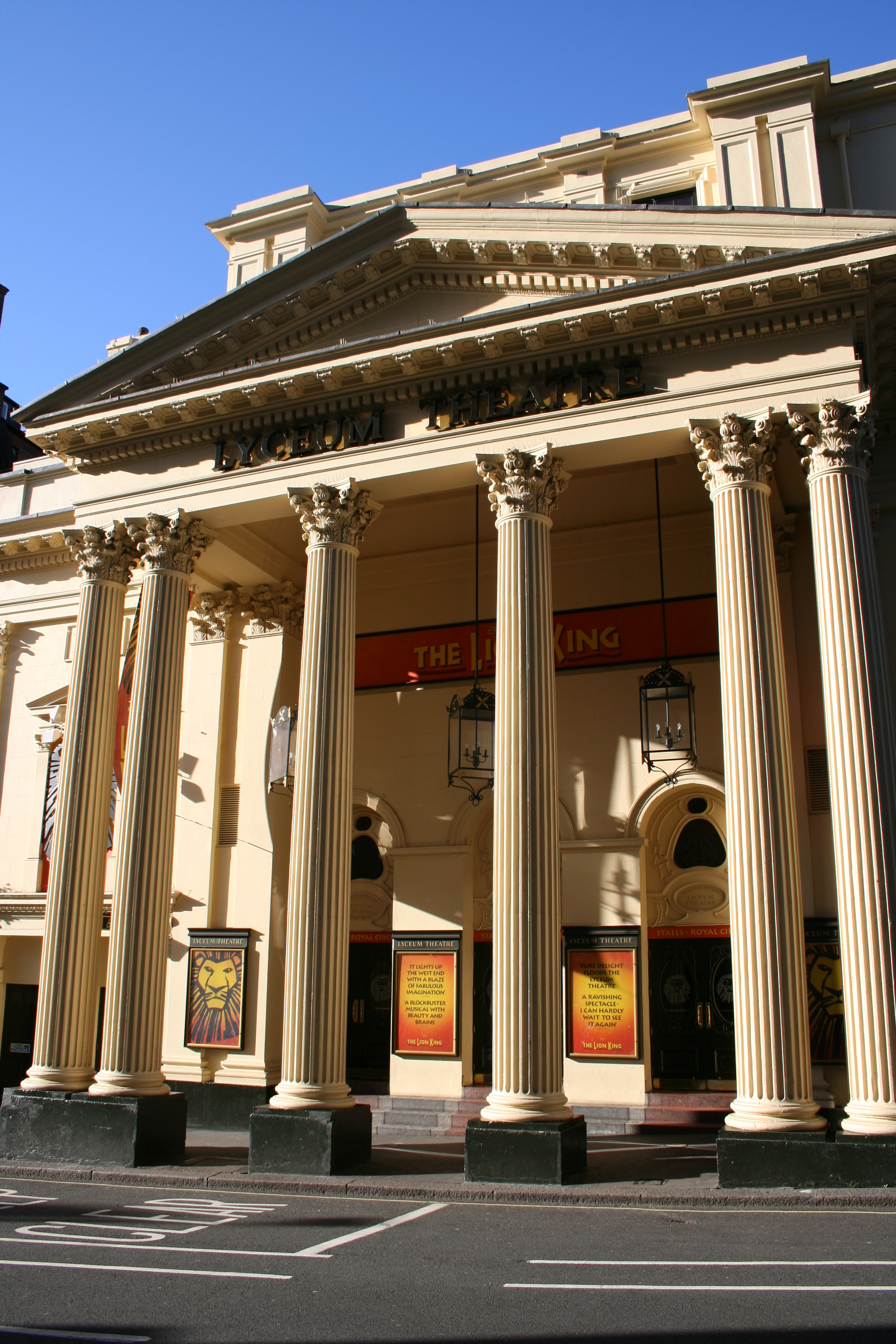
- The Lion King has been showing at the theatre since 1999.
- Interactive map of Lyceum Theatre
- Former names: Lyceum Ballroom
- Address: Wellington Street; London, WC2; United Kingdom
- Coordinates: 51°30′42″N 0°07′11″W
- Owner: ATG Entertainment
- Capacity: 2,100
- Type: West End theatre
- Designation: Grade II*
- Production: The Lion King
- Public transit: Covent Garden; Temple

Construction
- Opened: 14 July 1834; 192 years ago
- Rebuilt: 1882–1884 (C. J. Phipps); 1904 (Bertie Crewe); 1951 (Mathew & Sons); 1996 (Holohan Architects)
- Architect: Samuel Beazley

Website
- Official website

The Lyceum Theatre (/laɪˈsiːəm/ ly-SEE-əm) is a West End theatre located in the City of Westminster, on Wellington Street, just off the Strand in central London. It has a seating capacity of 2,100. The origins of the theatre date to 1765. Managed by Samuel Arnold, from 1794 to 1809 the building hosted a variety of entertainments including a circus produced by Philip Astley, a chapel, and the first London exhibition of waxworks by Madame Tussauds. From 1816 to 1830, it served as The English Opera House. After a fire, the house was rebuilt and reopened on 14 July 1834 to a design by Samuel Beazley. The building is unique in that it has a balcony overhanging the dress circle. It was built by the partnership of Peto & Grissell. The theatre then played opera, adaptations of Charles Dickens novels and James Planché's "fairy extravaganzas", among other works.

From 1871 to 1902, Henry Irving appeared at the theatre, especially in Shakespeare productions, usually starring opposite Ellen Terry. In 1904 the theatre was almost completely rebuilt and richly ornamented in Rococo style by Bertie Crewe, but it retained Beazley's façade and grand portico. It played mostly melodrama over the ensuing decades. The building closed in 1939 and was set to be demolished, but it was saved and converted into a Mecca Ballroom in 1951, styled the Lyceum Ballroom, where many well-known bands played. The Lyceum was closed in 1986 but restored to theatrical use in 1996 by Holohan Architects. Since 1999, the theatre has hosted The Lion King.

== History ==
=== Early years ===
The first Lyceum Theatre was housed in a building erected in 1765 on a site adjacent to the present theatre, with its entrance on The Strand, by the architect James Paine for the exhibitions of The Society of Artists. The Society of Artists was not a success, and the building was then leased out for dances and other entertainments, including musical entertainments by Charles Dibdin. Famed actor David Garrick also performed there. In 1794, the composer Samuel Arnold Sr rebuilt the interior of the building, making it into a proper theatre, but through the opposition of the existing patent theatres, he was not granted a patent. Therefore, he leased it to other entertainments again, including Philip Astley, who brought his circus there when his amphitheatre was burned down at Westminster. It was also used as a chapel, a concert room, and for the first London exhibition of waxworks displayed by Madame Tussauds in 1802.

The theatre finally became a licensed house in 1809, and until 1812 it was used for dramatic performances by the Drury Lane Company after the burning of their own theatre, until the erection of the new edifice. It staged one of the earliest tableaux vivants, as part of William Dimond's The Peasant Boy in 1811. In 1816, Samuel Arnold rebuilt the house to a design by Beazley and opened it as The English Opera House, but it was destroyed by fire in 1830. The house was famous for hosting the London première of Mozart's opera Così fan tutte (9 May 1811) and as the first theatre in Britain to have its stage lit by gas (6 August 1817). During this period, the "Sublime Society of Beef Steaks", which had been founded in 1735 by theatre manager Henry Rich, had its home at the theatre for over 50 years until 1867. The members, who never exceeded twenty-four in number, met every Saturday night to eat beefsteaks and drink port wine.

=== Present site ===
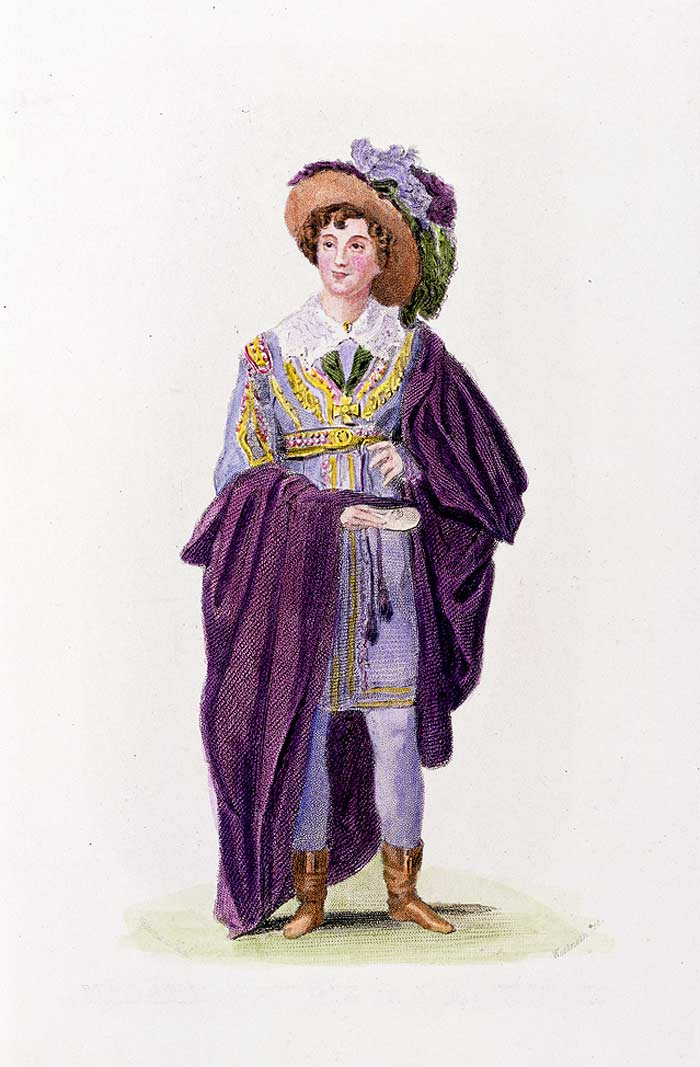
c. 1835 Engraving: Eliza Vestris in The Alcaid

In 1834, the present house opened slightly to the west, with a frontage on Wellington Street, under the name Theatre Royal Lyceum and English Opera House. The theatre was again designed by Beazley and cost £40,000. The new house championed English opera rather than the Italian operas that had played earlier in the century. Composer John Barnett produced a number of works in the first few years of the theatre, including The Mountain Sylph (1834), credited as the first modern English opera. It was followed by Fair Rosamund in 1837 and Farinelli in 1839 (both at the Theatre Royal, Drury Lane), and Blanche of Jersey here in 1840. In 1841–43, composer Michael William Balfe managed the theatre and produced National Opera here, but the venture was ultimately unsuccessful. From 1844 to 1847 the theatre was managed by husband and wife team Robert Keeley and Mary Anne Keeley, during which period the house became associated with adaptations of Charles Dickens's novels and Christmas books. For instance, an adaptation of Dickens' Martin Chuzzlewit ran for over 100 performances from 1844 to 1845 here, a long run for the time.

The Lyceum was later managed by Madame Lucia Elizabeth Vestris and Charles James Mathews from 1847 to 1855, who produced James Planché's "[fairy] extravaganzas" featuring spectacular stage effects. Their first big success was John Maddison Morton's Box and Cox. Tom Taylor's adaptation of A Tale of Two Cities, with Dickens himself as consultant, played in 1860, shortly after end of its serialisation and volume publication. Charles Fechter, who managed the theatre from 1863 to 1867 also favored spectacular productions. In 1866, Dion Boucicault's The Long Strike (his adaptation of Elizabeth Gaskell's Manchester novels Mary Barton and Lizzie Leigh) was produced here. Ethel Lavenu, the mother and grandmother of actors Tyrone Power Sr. and Tyrone Power performed in a number pieces at the theatre in the 1860s. W. S. Gilbert produced three plays here. In 1863, his first professional play, Uncle Baby, premièred. In 1867, he presented his Christmas pantomime, called Harlequin Cock Robin and Jenny Wren, and in 1884, he produced the drama Comedy and Tragedy.

In 1889, the world's finest Italian dramatic tenor, Francesco Tamagno, appeared at the Lyceum, singing the leading role in the first London production of Giuseppe Verdi's opera Otello.

=== Irving years ===
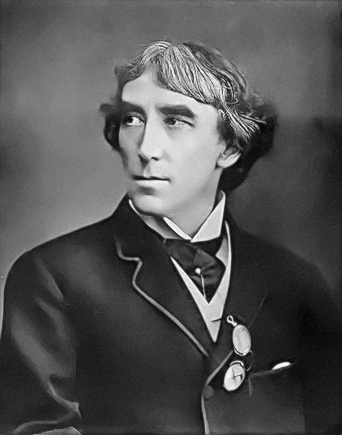
Sir Henry Irving

Beginning in 1871, under manager Hezekiah Linthicum Bateman and his wife Sidney Frances Bateman, Henry Irving appeared at the theatre in, among other things, many Shakespeare works. Irving began with the French melodrama The Bells, an instant hit in which he played the ghost-haunted burgomaster. The piece ran to sell-out crowds for 150 nights, which was an unusually long run at the time. Charles I, in 1872 was another hit, running for 180 nights. In 1874, Irving played Hamlet at the theatre, perhaps his greatest triumph, running for 200 nights. In 1878, after Bateman's death, Irving took over management of the theatre from his widow. The Builder, 28 September 1878 reported that there was a difference between Irving and Mrs. Bateman regarding the personnel of the company at the Lyceum. "Mr. Irving is said to have told Mrs. Bateman that he was resolved to have actors to act with him, and not dolls, otherwise he would no longer play at the Lyceum. The result was that Mrs. Bateman threw up the management of the theatre, and Mr. Irving takes her place." Mrs. Bateman became the manager of Sadler's Wells Theatre.

Irving continued to star in plays there, especially Shakespeare, until 1902, engaging co-star Ellen Terry for that entire period of 24 years. Bram Stoker worked between 1878 and 1898 as business manager of the theatre, and Irving was Stoker's real-life inspiration for the character Count Dracula in his 1897 novel, Dracula. Stoker hoped that Irving, with his dramatic, sweeping gestures, gentlemanly mannerisms, and speciality in playing villain roles, would play Dracula in the stage adaptation of his novel. However, Irving never agreed to appear in the stage version, although the play was produced at the Lyceum.

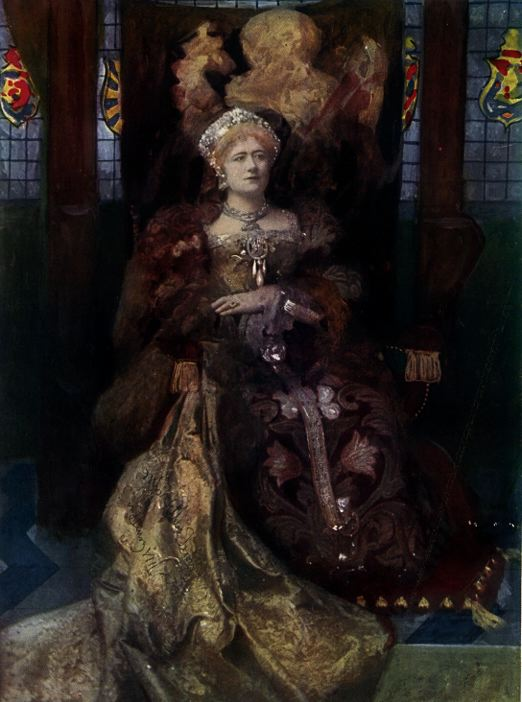
Ellen Terry as Katherine in Henry VIII

Irving and Terry began with Hamlet in 1878. Their 1879 production of The Merchant of Venice ran for an unusual 250 nights, and success followed success in the Shakespeare canon as well as in other major plays. Other celebrated productions included Much Ado About Nothing, The Lady of Lyons by Edward Bulwer-Lytton (1878), Romeo and Juliet, King Lear, The Lyons Mail by Charles Reade (1883), the immensely popular Faust by William Gorman Wills (1885, which even drew applications for reserved seats from foreigners), Macbeth (1888, with incidental music by Sir Arthur Sullivan), Henry VIII (1892), Becket by Alfred Tennyson (1893), King Arthur by J. Comyns Carr, with incidental music by Sir Arthur Sullivan (1895), Cymbeline (1896) and Victorien Sardou and Émile Moreau's play Madame Sans-Gêne (1897).

When Irving and Terry toured America, as they did several times beginning in 1883, the theatre played works with actors such as Johnston Forbes-Robertson, Mrs. Patrick Campbell, Sarah Bernhardt, and Eleonora Duse. Martin Harvey, a pupil of Irving's played a season there in 1899. Benoît-Constant Coquelin appeared as Cyrano de Bergerac in the summer of 1898.

=== Later years ===
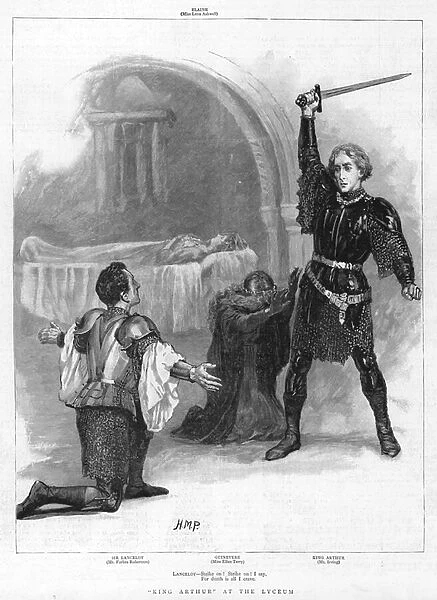
King Arthur at the theatre, 1895

After being bought by Thomas Barrasford in 1904, the theatre was rebuilt and richly ornamented in rococo style by Bertie Crewe, retaining only the façade and portico of the original building. The theatre presented music hall and variety, in an attempt to compete with the Palace Theatre and the new Stoll built London Coliseum, but this was not a success, and the theatre soon returned to presenting drama. From 1909 to 1938 the Melville Brothers ran a successful series of spectacular melodramas. In 1919, additional minor alterations to the theatre were made by Edward Jones. Between the wars, dramas played at the theatre for ten months each year, followed by Christmas pantomimes, including Queen of Hearts in 1938. The Lyceum was the last London theatre to continue the early practice of concluding pantomimes with a harlequinade, a free standing entertainment of slapstick clowning, juggling and tumbling. The tradition ended with the closure of the theatre in 1939.

In 1939, the London County Council bought the building, with plans to demolish it to make room for road improvement. The theatre closed that year with a landmark performance of Hamlet directed by and starring John Gielgud (Ellen Terry's great nephew). The road improvement plans collapsed, and after the war, in 1945, it was converted to a huge ballroom and reopened by Matthews and Sons, as the Lyceum Ballroom. The Miss World contest was staged at the venue every year from 1951 to 1968. Many big bands played here, including the Oscar Rabin Band which performed frequently. From the 1960s to the 1980s, the theatre was used as a pop concert venue and for television broadcasts. T.Rex and its earlier incarnation Tyrannosaurus Rex, the Sex Pistols, the Grateful Dead, The Groundhogs, The Clash, Bob Marley and the Wailers, Led Zeppelin, Queen, The Police, The Ramones, The Who, Emerson, Lake & Palmer, both incarnations of Adam and the Ants, U2, Colosseum, The Smiths, Iron Maiden and Pink Floyd all played here. Bob Marley and the Wailers' Live! album was recorded here on 18–19 July 1975. Genesis filmed a performance here in May 1980 for broadcast on the Old Grey Whistle Test. This footage appears on the 2007 CD/DVD re-release of their 1980 album Duke.

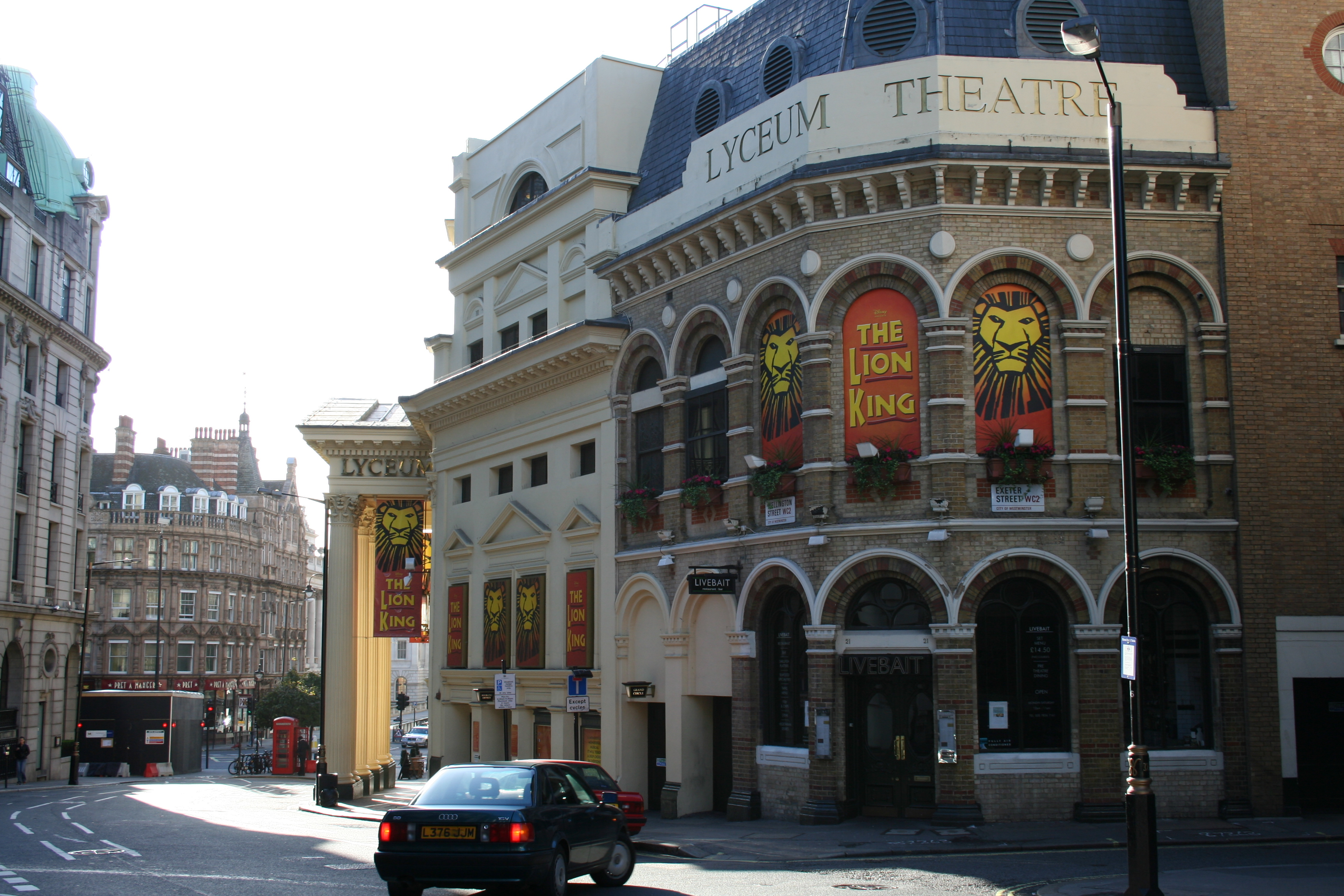
Side view of the theatre in 2006, with red Lion King displays visible

A proposed redevelopment of Covent Garden by the GLC in 1968 saw the theatre under threat, together with the nearby Vaudeville, Garrick, Adelphi and Duchess theatres. An active campaign by Equity, the Musicians' Union, and theatre owners under the auspices of the Save London Theatres Campaign helped save the theatre. In 1973, the theatre gained protection and was Grade II* listed as Interior despite adaptation and alteration for present ballroom use retains [a] substantial part of Crewe's work.

The theatre went dark in 1986, after the National Theatre's promenade performances (in 1985) of Bill Bryden's adaptation of the Mysteries trilogy. Brent Walker leased the theatre during this time but later gave up his lease, and in 1996 it was restored and reconverted into a theatre for large-scale musicals or opera (with a suitably large orchestra pit) by Holohan Architects. A production of Jesus Christ Superstar played from 1996 to 1998.

The theatre has been home to the musical theatre version of The Lion King since 1999. To celebrate the 10th anniversary of the production, which had grossed over £289 million and been seen by more than eight million people, 250 former cast members gathered onstage, together with designer-director Julie Taymor. James Earl Jones, who voiced the role of King Mufasa in the original Disney animated film, attended the performance. The theatre flooded on 11 May 2020 while the theatre was closed due to the COVID-19 pandemic, but the production reopened in July 2021.

== Recent and present productions ==
- Jesus Christ Superstar (19 November 1996 – 28 March 1998)
- Oklahoma! (February 1999 – June 1999)
- The Lion King (24 September 1999 – present)

== Sources ==
- Crowther, Andrew (2011). Gilbert of Gilbert & Sullivan: his Life and Character. London: The History Press. ISBN 978-0-7524-5589-1.
- Dickens, Charles Jr (2001) [1888, 1879]. "Lyceum Theatre entry". Dickens's Dictionary of London, 1888 (facsimile ed.). Devon: Old House Books. ISBN 1-873590-04-0. – A guide to London written by the novelist's son.
- Earl, John & Michael Sell, The Theatres Trust Guide to British Theatres 1750–1950 pp. 123–4 (Theatres Trust, 2000) ISBN 0-7136-5688-3
- Profile of the theatre
- Another profile of the theatre with images
- Article on the theatre
