= Victoria Theatre, Salford =

Theater in Lower Broughton, Salford, England

Coordinates: 53°29′28.5″N 2°15′33.5″W

Victoria Theatre
- The Old Lady of Broughton Bridge
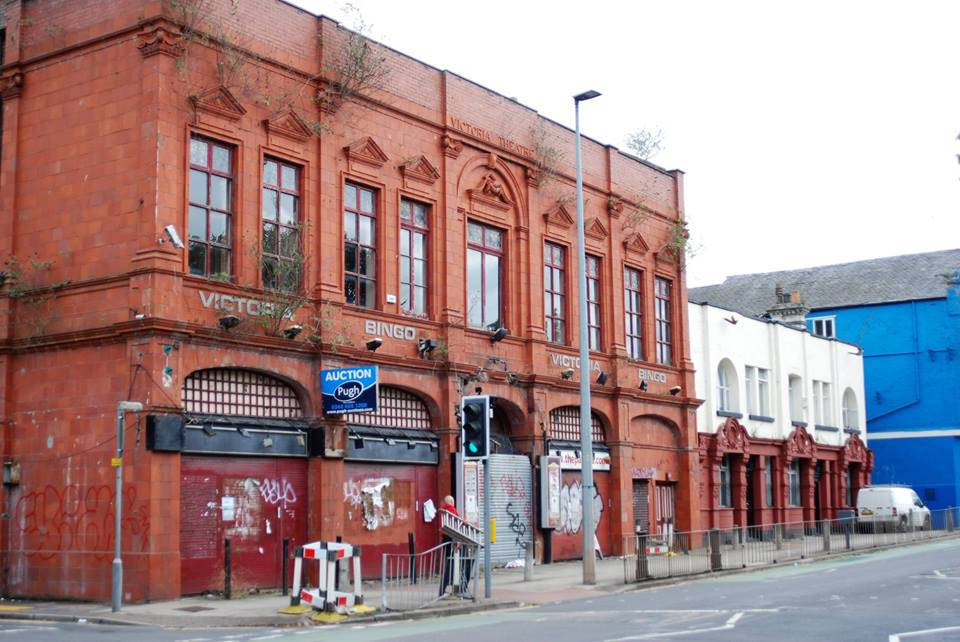
- Interactive map of Victoria Theatre
- Address: Great Clowes Street; Lower Broughton; Salford; Greater Manchester; M7 1RE; Salford; England
- Owner: Private purchaser, September 2018
- Capacity: 3,000
- Type: Theatre
- Designation: Grade II
- Current use: Vacant

Construction
- Opened: 10 December 1900 (closed 1971–1973) (closed 1973–1980s)
- Closed: 2008
- Years active: 95 approx
- Architect: Bertie Crewe

Website
- Save the Victoria Theatre Trust

The Victoria Theatre, Salford, is a theatre in the Lower Broughton area of Salford, Greater Manchester, England. It is situated on Great Clowes Street, on the corner of the Elton Street. The theatre officially opened 10 December 1900 and was last in use as a bingo hall in 2008. The original capacity was 2,000 seated, this was increased to 3,000 in 1910. Palatial Leisure Limited sold the building in September 2018.

== Background ==
The Victoria Theatre, designed by Bertie Crewe, was built by The Broughton Theatres Syndicate Ltd, the same syndicate which controlled the Regent Theatre, Cross Lane, Salford (destroyed by fire in 1952). The building's foundation stone was laid on 4 October 1899 by the actor Sir Henry Irving. Accompanying Irving was Bram Stoker, also in attendance were Bertie Crewe, the Civic Mayor of Salford Samuel Rudman, Frederick Platt-Higgins (Conservative MP for Salford North), C. V. Haworth (chairman of the syndicate), a large number of the members from the Salford Corporation, and former Civic Mayors of Salford Sir W. H. Bailey and Sir Richard Mottram. Crewe presented Irving with a mallet and a silver trowel. In a short speech Irving remarked, "I have always contended that a well-conducted playhouse is a centre of rational recreation, and without rational recreation no community can pretend to have its facultics in proper order."

When the application for the theatre's licence was heard by the town council, Mr. J. Broxap put forward an amendment, "That the resolution of the Watch Committee be approved subject to no application being made to the Excise for the licence to sell intoxicating drink." The amendment was seconded by Mr. Haworth who added, "Persons who went in and out to get drink interrupted the performance, to the annoyance of those who desired to see the piece." The council voted 25 for the amendment to alter the theatre's licence so that alcohol could not be sold, 32 against and 1 abstention. The Mayor declared the amendment lost.

The 2,000 seater theatre opened on 10 December 1900 with the play "Sign of the Cross," performed by William Greet's company, with Edward Vincent as the Prefect and Virginia Buckle as the Christian girl Mercia. The front of the theatre was described as "red terra-cotta, divided by Ionic pilasters into five bays" and the foyer was described as "a hall 34 feet long and 18 feet wide, with marble mosaic floor, walls panelled in fibrous plaster, and hand-painted ceiling". The dimensions of the stage were also recorded as "Its width is 74 feet, the distance from the curtain line to the back wall is 40 feet, the distance from stage to grid is 50 feet, and the proscenium opening is 30 feet in width.

== Use as a cinema ==
In November 1901, less than a year after opening, the theatre began showing films and in 1913 it was granted a cinema licence. The owner/managers, Messrs J. P. Moore & Montague Beadyn, also increased the capacity in 1910 from 2,000 to 3,000. However, from 1917 to 1919 the venue became a theatre once more.

In 1919 the theatre consultant Mr. Watson redesigned the auditorium with interior paintings and a Tudor Café and the theatre became predominantly a cinema again under H. D. Moorhouse, and remained a cinema until its closure in July 1958. The owner/managers from 1945 were Broughton Cinemas Ltd.

== 1958–1971 ==
Following the cinema's closure in July 1958 the theatre was used as a clothing / furniture store with some performances by repertory groups, including Venture Productions, and pantomimes being staged during the 1960s.

From the mid 1960s until the summer of 1971, the theatre was owned by a Salford businessman, Councillor Sam Goldberg. Goldberg allowed repertory groups such as Venture Productions to put on productions rent free. He also used the theatre as winter headquarters for his own Southport Repertory Company. Goldberg tried unsuccessfully to sell the freehold to Salford City Council, in the hope that they might operate the building as a civic theatre and arts centre. Talks stalled after it was estimated that the cost of modernising the building could be about £80,000, the theatre was running at a loss at the time of Goldberg's death. Councillor Cecil Franks, the chairman, said it was hopeless to try to maintain a "Victorian relic" of this size in its present form. Goldberg died prior to the North Manchester Amateur Operatic Society's production of "The Quaker Girl", May–June 1971, (music by Lionel Monckton, lyrics by Adrian Ross and Percy Greenbank), the theatre then lay dark.

== Use as a bingo hall ==
After a brief unsuccessful attempt to run the venue as a bingo hall in 1973 the theatre closed again. It then remained dark until the 1980s when a second attempt was successful and the bingo hall remained open until 2008. The theatre became a Grade II Listed Building on 18 January 1980. During its time as a bingo hall in the 1980s the building was severely damaged when its third floor was removed and replaced with a less ornate brick wall.

== 2008–2012 ==
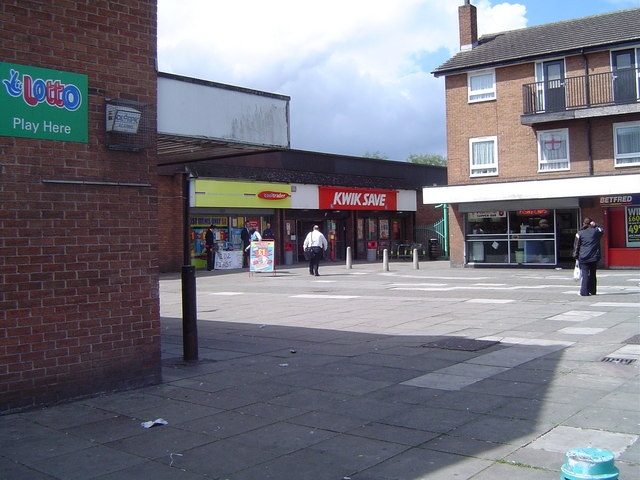
Mocha Parade, facing the theatre, 2009

Palatial Leisure Limited closed down Victoria Bingo Hall in 2008 and have since carried out work on the roof; however, urgent repairs are currently needed to deal with the plant growth on the venue's facade. The front canopy was also destroyed after a truck collided with it.

In 2012 Palatial Leisure Limited decided to put the theatre on the market for £275,000. In the same year the Theatres Trust placed the Victoria Theatre (Salford) on their Theatre Buildings at Risk (TBAR) register, although it was in the lowest of their four categories. The Theatres Trust noted that several of the theatre's original features are still intact, "There are substantial remains of wooden sub-stage machinery with paddle levers and the construction for corner traps and four bridges. The grave trap is complete with its platform."; they also noted the need for regeneration in the area surrounding the theatre.

A 'Save Victoria Theatre Campaign Meeting' was held on 1 August 2012 at the Robert Powell Theatre, University of Salford. The meeting resulted in the formation of a community group, Save the Victoria Theatre Salford (SVTS). In the group were David Dewsnip, a production technician at the University of Salford, who called the meeting, and Allen Christey, an electrical engineer, who was involved in a failed attempt to save the theatre from being turned into a bingo hall in 1971. Following the meeting a steering group was set up with Dewsnip and Christey as joint leaders, the rest of the steering group was named as: Roland Metcalf, Bob Howorth, Mary Ferrer, Estelle Neuman and Cath Connett. However concerns have been raised about how the members of the steering group were selected, such as the non-inclusion of Micky Dacks, and whether or not "the community is being used for the benefit of Salford University".

== 2013–present ==
In February 2013 Save the Victoria Theatre Salford formed Save the Victoria Theatre Trust (SVTT) to take forward the potential purchase, refurbishment and reopening of the building. The trust was initially composed of Dewsnip, Christey, Howorth, Ferrer, and John Lucas. Palatial Leisure is willing to sell the building to SVTT but they are unable to afford it. In May 2015 Salford City Council visited the site with a view to serving an Urgent Works Notice. However, the visit showed no evidence of water penetration so the council is considering other options and actions. These have yet to be determined and in the meantime the building is subject to continued deterioration. Ferrer resigned from the trust in January 2014 and Lucas resigned in January 2015. Two new directors, Samantha Kelly and Ray Walker, were appointed in November 2015.

External videos
- News item
- Save the Victoria Theatre Campaign reignites, 11 December 2017 via Quays News

In December 2017 Quays News reported that SVTT was being relaunched with the support of Salford City Council's mayor Paul Dennett and the local MP Graham Stringer. However, in September 2018 the theatre was put up for auction with a guide price of £350,000 which prompted the SVTT to campaign to have the building recognized as an 'asset of community value'. The council's Draft Local Plan (2016) document promised protection for the building, "securing its positive reuse, preferably for a community use in keeping with its original function and design", but its sale has caused concern within SVTT that the revised plan, due to be published in November 2018, will include a plan to demolish the theatre.

== Dimensions ==
The current stage dimensions are as follows (year):

- Stage dimensions (1972):

Depth: 12.19m (40 ft) and 0.61m (2 ft)
Forestage width: stage left: 10.97m (36 ft) / stage right: 7.92m (26 ft)
Proscenium width (1972): 9.75m (32 ft)

- Height to grid: 15.24 m (50 ft)
- Orchestra pit (1972): area with rail (now modified)
