= Relentless Church =

Evangelical denomination

Relentless Church (formerly El Shaddai International Christian Centre) was an Evangelical denomination led by Ramson Mumba. The church was also a member of the Evangelical Alliance.

The church no longer exists as an overarching entity. Some congregations have continued under other names:

- The London branch as Radiant City Church London
- The Manchester branch as Grace Life Church Manchester
- The Birmingham branch as The Revival City Church Birmingham
- The Bradford branch as Hope Church Family
- The Oxford branch as Oxford Word of Faith Church

== History ==
Ramson Mumba started his first church in 1998 in Bingley, West Yorkshire, with his first wife Linda Mumba and then moved to Bradford in 2000, experiencing considerable growth. In 2004, Ramson Mumba moved to London to plant a church, and churches have also been started in Manchester, Birmingham, Cardiff, and Lusaka, Zambia.

In early 2007, the London church purchased the Golders Green Hippodrome for £5 million. In 2010, the church took out a five-year lease on Castle Gate Congregational Centre in Nottingham.

Relentless Church planted its seventh church in the UK, into the city of Sheffield. Dr Ramson also moved to Houston, Texas to start the ninth church globally. After leaving his first wife and moving to the US without her, he married his second wife Estrella Mumba in 2014 and they made their home together in Houston, Texas.

Ramson Mumba is the spiritual child of Creflo Dollar, and has been affiliated with his organisation in 2002. Ramson Mumba was described as "chic and trendy" by Jonathan Oloyede in an article on the black church in Christianity Magazine.

ESICC is not a black-majority church, and makes it clear that it is a church where all are accepted, regardless of race, skin colour, or gender.

== Controversies ==
In 2017, El-Shaddai International Christian Centre went into winding up as a business and charity. Its buildings, including the Golders Green Hippodrome, were closed and repossessed. The US arm of the church continued under the Relentless Church name. In 2018, Ramson Mumba filed for bankruptcy in Texas. and legal action was taken against him in 2020 by Pacific Diversified Investments LLC.
