= Glossary of theater terms =

A list of theater terms, and brief descriptions, listed in alphabetical order.

- act: A division of a play, may be further broken down into "scenes". Also, what the performers do on-stage.
- ad-lib: When a performer improvises line on-stage. Derived from ad libitum (Latin).
- aisle: An open space amongst seating for passage.
- alternate: see understudy.
- amphitheater: an open-air theater, with seats rising in curved rows.
- angel investor: An individual or organization which provides financial support for a production.
- apron stage: The front area of the stage, nearest the audience; the portion of the stage in front of proscenium arch.
- aside: A line spoken by an actor/actress directly to the audience, unheard by the other performers on-stage.
- assistant director: Works very closely with the director and with the cast. They will gather research on the production, help keep the production true to the director's vision and help lead rehearsals should the director not be able to attend.
- assistant stage manager: Assists the production stage manager, with everything from taping floor plan marking to making sure that everyone has a copy of the script. They also make sure that the set has the needed props. Before a rehearsal the assistant stage manager helps the stage manager make sure everything is ready. At the end of rehearsal the assistant stage manager along with the stage manager will make sure that the space is locked up. Often shortened to ASM.
- audition: The activity where actors/actresses perform for the director or casting director, in order to obtain roles in a production.
- auditorium: The portion of a theater which contains the audience seating.
- avant-garde: Experimental or innovative works or people, derived from the French.
- balcony: An elevated portion of seating in the back of the auditorium.
- curtain call: At the end of a live performance the cast will come out and do a bow while the audience applauds.
- doubling: When an actor plays more than one character in a production. Most times this is done for economical reasons but it can be that because an actor would like to take on more than one role in the performance.
- producing house: A theatre which produces its own shows.
- receiving house:(sometimes called a roadhouse): A theatre which does not produce its own repertoire but instead receives touring theatre companies, usually for a brief period such as three nights or an entire week. The incoming company may receive a share of the box office takings or a minimum guaranteed payment. West End theatres in London and most Broadway theatres in New York City are also receiving houses, as the venue solely provides facilities to the incoming show even though the production may stay for many years. A theatre which produces its own shows is known as a producing house. Some regional theatres will be both a producing house and a receiving house.
- understudy (also known as an alternate): A person who learns the part of a specific character or characters. Should the performer who is cast in those roles be unable to perform their part due for any reason (e.g. illness, injury etc.), the understudy will step in and perform the role.
