= Georges Metaxa =

Romanian singer and actor (1894–1950)

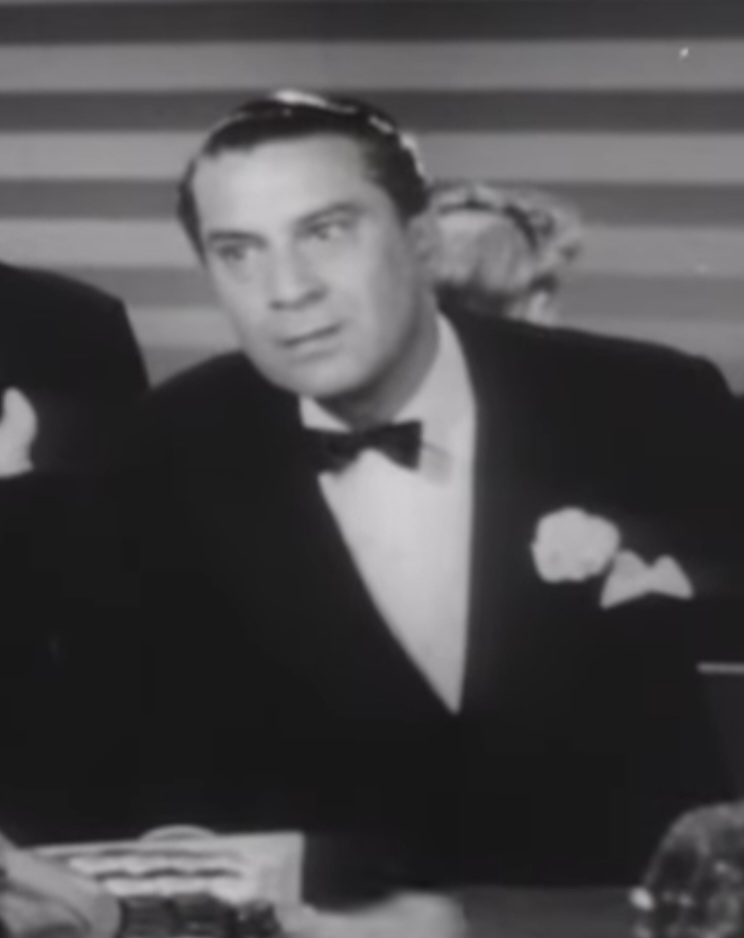
- Metaxa in Hi Diddle Diddle (1943)
- Born: George Radu Metaxa; 11 September 1894; Bucharest, Romania
- Died: 8 December 1950 (aged 56); Monroe, Louisiana, U.S.
- Occupations: Singer; actor
- Years active: 1931–1945
- Spouses: Helene Valoary (m. 19??; div. 1933); Margaret M. Stafford (m. 1933; died 1934) Byrnece Mcfadden Muckerman (m. 1936)
- Children: 1

George-Radu Metaxa (11 September 1899 – 8 December 1950) was a Romanian-born American singer, film & stage actor. He was known for his crooning high baritone voice and often portrayed genteel antagonists.

== Life and career ==
Metaxa was born in Bucharest, Romania, to Nicholas Metaxa and Emilie Theophilatos. He worked as a civil servant, becoming principal private secretary to the Romanian Ministry of Agriculture before emigrating to London in 1926 to pursue a career in musical comedy.

He first began his showbusiness career recording songs, the first being the Romanian folk song "Mandrulita" in 1927. After engaging with Charles B. Cochran, his first stage billing was in John Hastings Turner's 1929 musical revue Wake Up and Dream. Metaxa was then cast in Noël Coward's operetta Bitter Sweet. He continued to record songs in London until 1931, finishing with Ray Noble's "Goodnight Sweetheart" before moving to New York with the Bitter Sweet touring company.

His career in New York was slow to start, perhaps in part due to the saturation of similar male leads at the time. He nevertheless managed to find roles, his first film role being in Secrets of a Secretary in 1931. Metaxa was cast in the musical The Cat and the Fiddle and later the musical comedy Revenge with Music. He notably starred opposite Ginger Rogers and Fred Astaire in 1936's Swing Time, playing Astaire's love rival, the bandleader Ricky Romero.

He was married to Helene Valoary until their amicable divorce in July 1933, and they had one daughter. He then married 18-year-old actress Margaret Stafford in September 1933. In April 1934, Metaxa and Stafford were involved in an automobile accident in Miami, which killed Stafford and gravely injured Metaxa. He later married Byrnece Macfadden Muckerman (the daughter of American publisher and bodybuilder Bernarr Macfadden) in 1946.

Towards the end of his life, Metaxa's health declined to such a point he had to turn down roles, notably, the leading role in South Pacific that was being shown in London. Metaxa died suddenly of a heart attack 8 December 1950 at a hotel in Monroe, Louisiana, as he and his wife were on their way to their home in Beverly Hills after returning from a seven-month-long trip around Europe.

== Selected performances ==
=== Film ===
Year	Title	Role	Soundtrack
1931	Secrets of a Secretary	Frank D'Agnoll	
1931	The House That Shadows Built	Frank D'Agnoll	Compilation film released by Paramount Pictures to commemorate the studio's 20th anniversary
1933	Kissing Time (Short film)	Lieutenant Juan Segovia	Performed on the tracks Let's Drink and All My Life I've Waited (For Someone Like You)
1936	Swing Time	Ricky Romero	Performed on the tracks The Way You Look Tonight and A Fine Romance
1936	Sheik to Sheik (Short film)	Lieutenant Georges	Performed on the tracks The Song of the Sand and What Makes the Night So Beautiful?
1940	The Doctor Takes a Wife	Jean Rovere	
1941	Paris Calling	Waiter	
1943	Background to Danger	L.V. Bastaki (uncredited)	
1943	Submarine Base	Nazi Agent Anton Kroll	
1943	Hi Diddle Diddle	Tony Spinelli	
1943	West Side Kid	Dr. Kenton	
1944	The Mask of Dimitrios	Hans Werner	
1945	Scotland Yard Investigator	Henri	

=== Stage ===
Year	Title	Role	Notes
1929-1930	Bitter Sweet	Carl Linden	
1931-1932	The Cat and the Fiddle	Victor Florescu	395 Performances
1933	Twenty-five Dollars an Hour	Claude de Rozay	
1934-1935	Revenge with Music	Carlos	158 performances
