= Park Square Theatre (Boston) =

Theatre in Boston, Massachusetts, U.S.

Coordinates: 42°21′3.37″N 71°4′6.4″W

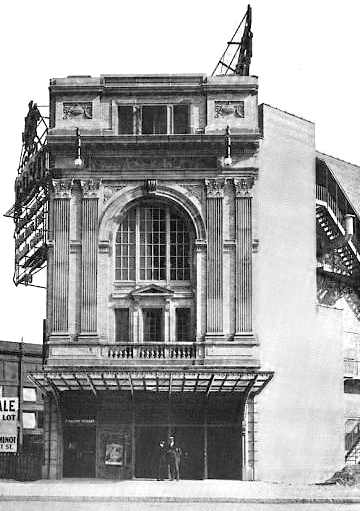
Park Square Theatre, Boston, 1915

The Park Square Theatre was a theatre in Park Square in Boston, Massachusetts, designed by architect Clarence Blackall. It opened January 19, 1914, as the Cort Theatre, named for impresario John Cort. It was his first theatrical venue in Boston.

In August 1915 the Cort Theatre was purchased by Archibald and Edgar Selwyn and renamed the Park Square Theatre. In 1921 it was renamed the Selwyn Theatre, one of many Selwyn theatres in the United States. In time the building was replaced by a parking garage.

== Shows ==
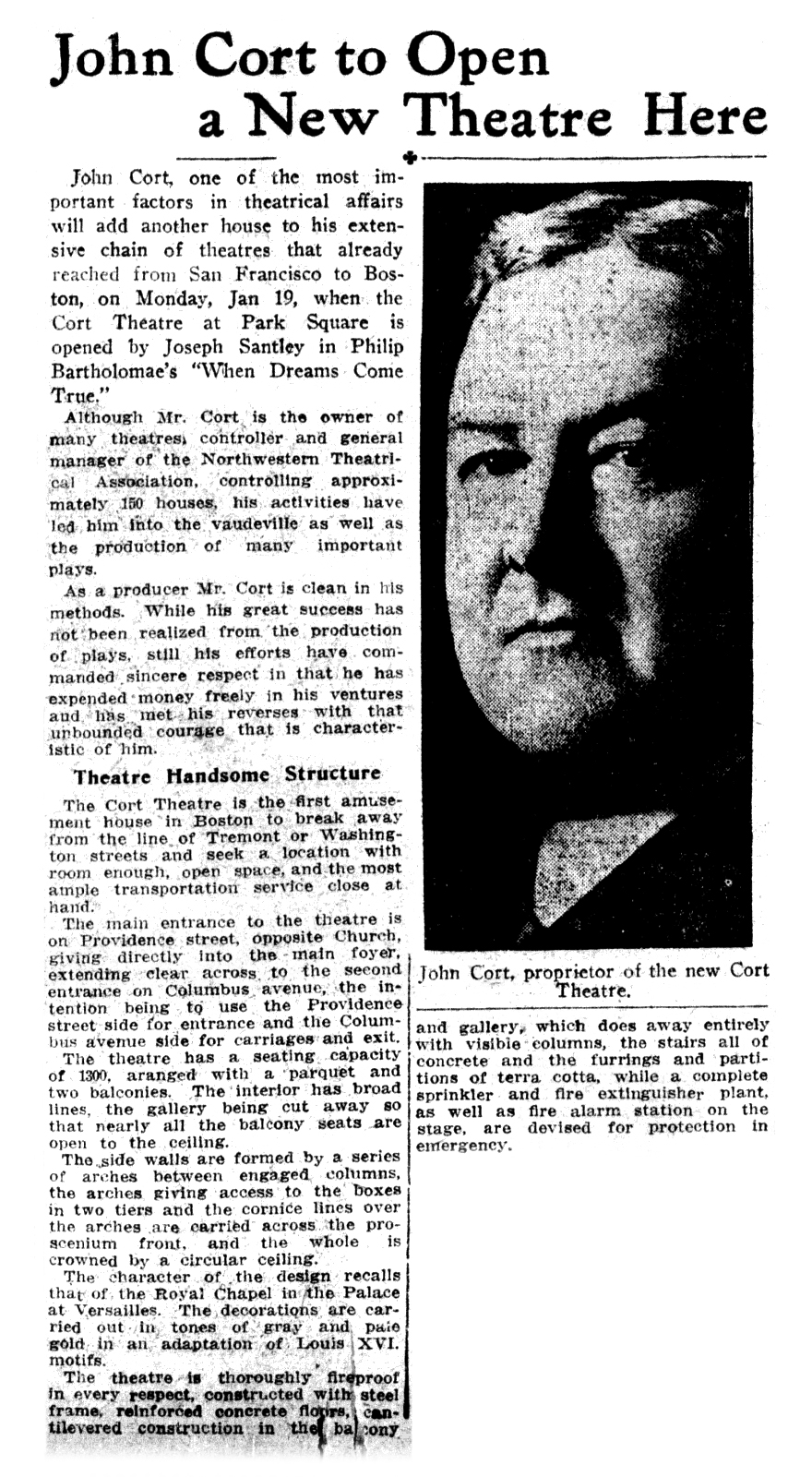
Feature story on the opening of the Cort Theatre in The Boston Sunday Post (January 11, 1914)

The Cort Theatre opened Monday, January 19, 1914, with the musical comedy, When Dreams Come True. Joseph Santley starred, reprising his role in the Broadway production. Other shows include the following:

- Twin Beds
- James Forbes' The Show Shop, with George Sidney and Zelda Sears
- Roi Cooper Megrue's Under Fire, with William Courtenay
- Edgar Selwyn's Rolling Stones
- Jane Cowl and Jane Murfin's Lilac Time
- Avery Hopwood's Fair and Warmer
- The Naughty Wife, with Charles Cherry
- George V. Hobart's Buddies
- Edgar Selwyn and Channing Pollock's The Crowded Hour, with Wilette Kershaw
- Eugene Walter's The Challenge, with Holbrook Blinn
- Nightie Night, with Francis Byrne
- Roi Cooper Megrue's T for 3, with Arthur Byron
- The Right Girl, with Charles Purcell

=== Gallery ===
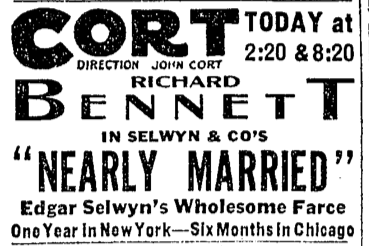
February 1915 ad

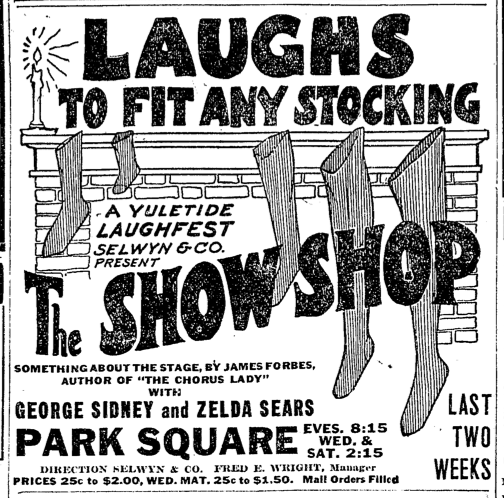
December 1915 ad

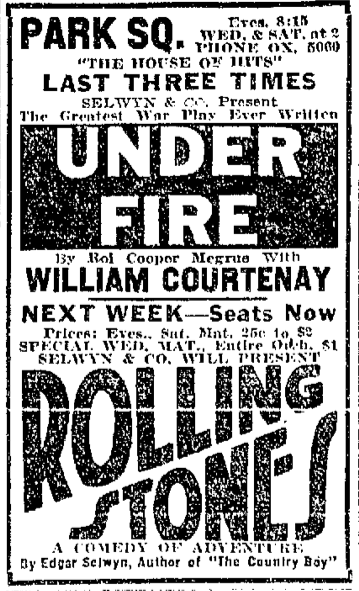
1916 ad

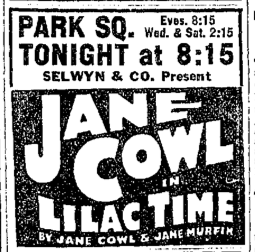
1917 ad

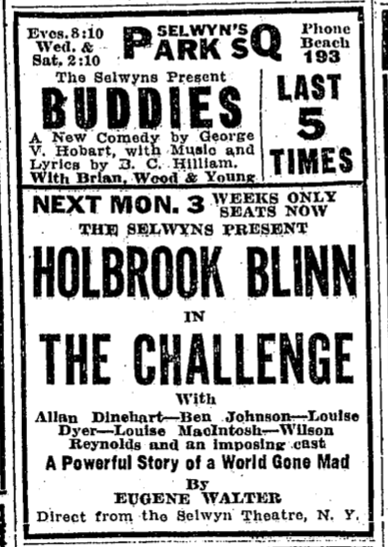
1919 ad

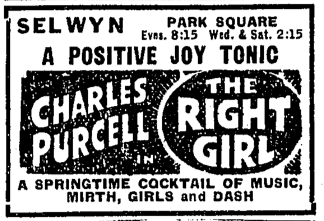
June 1921 ad

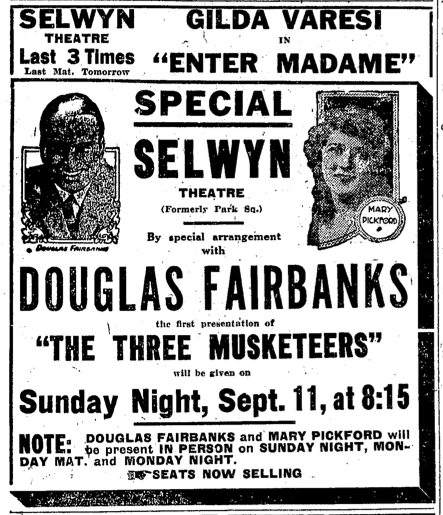
September 1921 ad
