= Archibald Selwyn =

American play broker, theater owner and stage producer

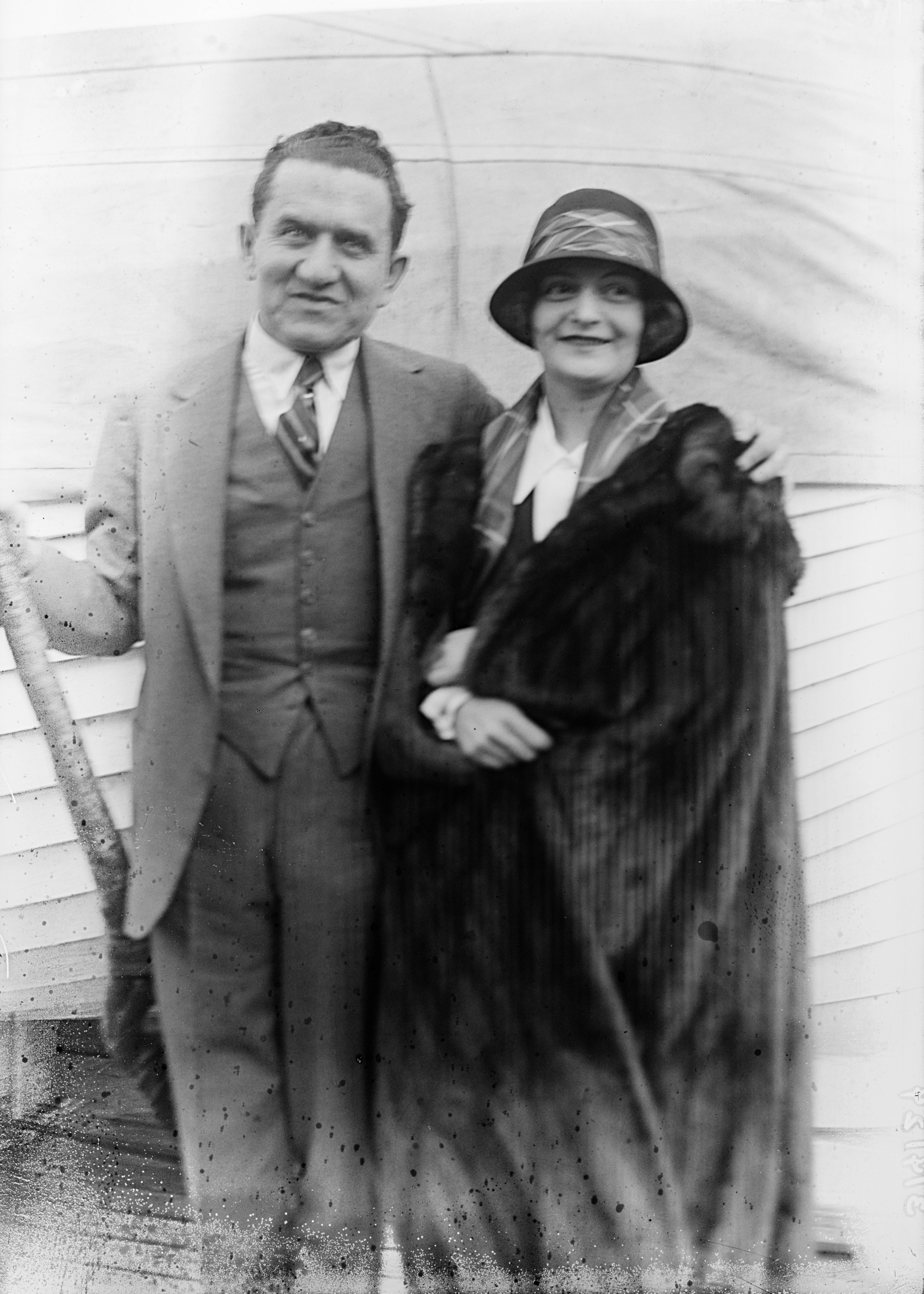
- Selwyn and his wife, 1920s
- Born: Archibald Simon; November 3, 1877; Canada
- Died: June 21, 1959 (aged 81); Los Angeles, California, USA
- Occupation: Theater Producer
- Known for: Broadway productions

Archibald Selwyn (also Arch or Archie Selwyn; November 3, 1877 – June 21, 1959) was a Canadian-American play broker, theater owner and stage producer who had many Broadway successes. He and his brother Edgar Selwyn were partners. They were among the founders of Goldwyn Pictures, later to be merged into MGM.

== Early years ==
Archibald Selwyn was born in Canada on November 3, 1877. The family name was Simon, later changed to Selwyn. Archibald and his family lived in Toronto, Ontario, then moved to Selma, Alabama, where his parents died. Archibald's brother Edgar Selwyn, an actor, moved to New York City. Archibald followed. His brother found a job for Archibald in the box office of the Herald Square Theatre. The brothers moved into the business of brokering tickets and then created the American Play Company in partnership with Elisabeth Marbury and John Ramsay. This was a play brokerage enterprise.

Upton Sinclair worked with Margaret Mayo in the summer of 1906 on a dramatization of The Jungle, which flopped after a six-week run. The Selwyn brothers, then acting as play brokers, met him at that time. Sinclair had lunch with Arch Selwyn and described The Metropolis, a novel that he was writing. Selwyn was enthusiastic about the project, and jokingly suggested that Sinclair find work with a rich family so he could learn about how these people lived. The next day a story appeared in the New York Morning Telegraph saying Sinclair was obtaining the material for his book by spying on the rich. Sinclair wrote the paper an indignant letter of denial, but the legend was established.

Edgar Selwyn, a prolific playwright as well as an actor, married Margaret Mayo. The two were co-authors of The Wall Street Girl (1912), in which Will Rogers had a role. The brother started to collaborate on producing plays. Where Edgar had a grounding in acting and writing plays, and understood what would appeal to the public, Archibald was a businessman. The Selwyns partnered with producer Crosby Gaige (1882–1949), with whom they produced the hits Within the Law (1912) and Why Marry? (1917). (Note: Why Marry, by Jesse Lynch Williams, was the first play to win a Pulitzer Prize.) They co-produced Lilac Time (1917) with Gaige, which also starred Jane Cowl. Gaige later broke with them and had a successful career on his own. Other pre-war plays and musicals produced by the Selwyn brothers included Under Cover (1914) and Fair and Warmer (1915).

== Films ==
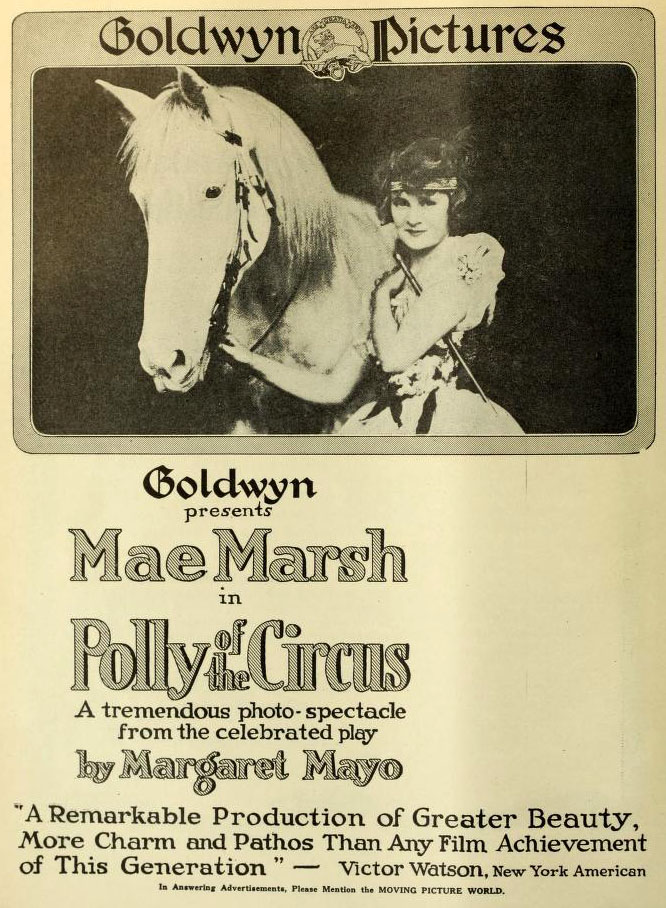
Poster for Polly of the Circus (1917)

The All-Star Feature Company was formed around 1913 to make feature films from famous plays. The playwright Augustus Thomas directed "the world's greatest plays enacted by distinguished stage celebrities." Archibald Selwyn and Philip Klein joined the company. Between 1913 and 1915 All-Star created Arizona, In Mizzoura, Colorado, Alabama and The Witching Hour, all written by Thomas, as well as Paid in Full (Eugene Walter) and Shore Acres (James A. Herne). The company also made The Arab, The Country Boy and Pierre of the Plains by Edgar Selwyn. In these films Edgar Selwyn repeated his stage performances.

In 1914 Archibald Selwyn was one of the producers of the film The Jungle, based on the Upton Sinclair novel. His sister-in-law Margaret Mayo wrote the script.

Sam Goldfish joined Edgar and Archibald Selwyn in 1916 to form Goldwyn Pictures. The company name was formed by combining the first part of "Goldfish" with the last part of "Selwyn". In September 1917 the company released its first film, Polly of the Circus starring Mae Marsh. The film was based on the 1907 play of the same name by Margaret Mayo. Goldwyn made all of its films in Fort Lee, New Jersey, in the first two years, first at the Solax studio and then at Universal. In a press release dated April 14, 1917, in which Goldwyn Pictures announced the move from Solax to Universal the company stated that "Samuel Goldfish, Edgar and Archibald Selwyn and Arthur Hopkins are determined to make good the promise of twelve completed pictures by September 1..." The filmed plays were not profitable, but the studio kept going with popular films that featured Lon Chaney and Will Rogers.

Sam Goldfish, who changed his name to Sam Goldwyn, was the driving force in the company. (Note: The name "Goldwyn"was copyrighted, but the copyright was held by Sam Goldfish, the President of the Goldwyn company. The court granted him permission to change his name to Sam Goldwyn. Judge Learned Hand remarked that "a self-made man may prefer a self-made name.") On March 10, 1922, Sam Goldwyn was voted out of the presidency of the company by the board of directors. The company was merged in 1923 with Metro Pictures to become Metro-Goldwyn Pictures, then renamed Metro-Goldwyn-Mayer after Louis B. Mayer took control.

== Theaters ==
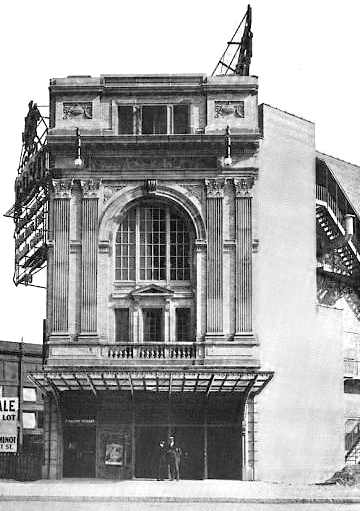
Park Square Theatre, Boston in 1915

Arch Selwyn partnered with the Shubert Brothers and William A. Brady in building the Princess Theatre, a small 299-seat auditorium on 39th street that opened in 1913. The theater was not successful at first, and Selwyn and Brady gave up their shares to the producer F. Ray Comstock. In 1915 the Selwyns bought the Cort Theatre in Boston, renaming it the Park Square Theatre. In 1921 they changed the name to the Selwyn Theatre, one of a chain of Selwyn Theatres. The theater was demolished around 1926 for a parking lot.

The Selwyns bought land along 42nd street, Manhattan, where they decided to build three theaters. The first was the 1,051-seat Selwyn Theatre built for them in 1918 in the Italian Renaissance style. The fan-shaped layout ensured that every seat felt close to the stage. The first play they staged there was Information Please starring Jane Cowl, which flopped. Later the theater put on many successful plays and minor musicals. The Selwyns sold this theater in 1927. The building was converted into a cinema in 1934.

In 1920 the Selwyn brothers bought the Bryant Theater, between 42nd and 43rd streets, a vaudeville theater with an elegant auditorium. They renamed it the Apollo and were successful staging musicals there until the Depression, when it was converted to a cinema. In 1922 the Selwyns partnered with Sam Harris to open two theaters on North Dearborn Avenue in Chicago. Before they could open they had to pay the mobster Timothy D. Murphy $10,000 for protection.

== Post-war production ==
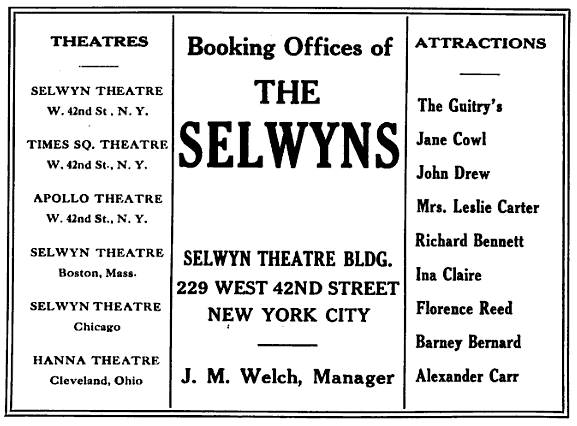
1921 advertisement

In 1919 John Golden arranged a meeting with his fellow producers Fred Zimmerman, Arch Selwyn, Florenz Ziegfeld, Jr., Winchell Smith and L. Lawrence Weber with the goal of cooperating on common issues such as censorship and ticket speculation. He wanted to set up a forum so the producers could share ideas, and wanted stop the rival organizations poaching each other's stars. This led to formation of the Producing Managers' Association, which may have inadvertently shown actors the value of organizing into the Actors' Equity Association.

The Selwyn brothers produced Smilin' Through in 1919. On June 2, 1921, they launched the review Snapshots of 1921 at their Selwyn Theatre, coproduced by the Selwyns, featuring numbers by George Gershwin and starring DeWolf Hopper, Lew Fields and Nora Bayes. The show ran for 60 performances. Reviews were generally favorable, although Variety said there were "boresome periods of blank stupidity" and the New York Times said there was "little or nothing for the adult intelligence."

In 1922 Arch Selwyn offered Mrs. Leslie Carter the role of Lady Kitty in W. Somerset Maugham's The Circle. The Circle drew large audiences in the spring of 1922, and relaunched Carter's career. She said "I don't believe I would ever have come back to the American stage had it not been for Arch Selwyn." The Circle went on tour in the 1922–23 season in cities such as Philadelphia, Chicago and Boston, with great success. In 1922 Arch Selwyn produced Channing Pollock's The Fool. The initial reviews were poor, but Pollock launched a publicity campaign that created a wave of interest and turned the play into a great success. The Selwyns produced Romeo and Juliet in 1923. Arch Selwyn produced Andre Charlot's Review in 1924 at the Times Square Theatre, a musical review from Britain directed by André Charlot. Stars included Gertrude Lawrence, Beatrice Lillie and Jack Buchanan. The show was a hit, with 289 performances.

The Selwyn brothers did not work together after 1924. (Note: Edgar Selwyn later produced hits such as a stage version of Gentlemen Prefer Blondes (1926) and Strike up the Band (1930).) Arch Selwyn continued to produce plays such as Noël Coward's Easy Virtue (1925) and This Year of Grace (1928). In 1926 he brought Andre Charlot's Review back to the Broadway stage with the original principals. Paulette Goddard appeared in Selwyn's production of The Unconquerable Male, which premiered in March 1927 in Atlantic City, New Jersey. The play was a flop, and closed after only three days. This Year of Grace opened in November 1928 and ran for 158 performances. Coward starred with Beatrice Lillie, and wrote the music, lyrics and sketches. Selwyn produced Coward's Bitter Sweet (1929), an operetta, in partnership with Florenz Ziegfeld, Jr. The show was praised by the New York critics, but ran for only 159 performances. On October 29, 1929, the stock market crashed, and Ziegfeld was wiped out.

After this Selwyn had little success. The musical comedy Wake Up and Dream, co-produced by Arch Selwyn, opened at The Selwyn on December 30, 1929, and ran to 136 performances. The cast included Jack Buchanan, Jessie Matthews and Tilly Losch. Cole Porter had written the music. The revue was tasteful, refined and intelligent, but was short of material. Reviews were mixed. Continental Varieties, a vaudeville review co-produced by Selwyn and Harold B. Franklin, opened at the Little Theatre on October 3, 1934, and ran for 77 performances. Yip Harburg wrote the lyrics.

Revenge with Music was a modern version of the Spanish short story The Three-Cornered Hat by Pedro Alarcón. It opened at the New Amsterdam on November 28, 1934, and included some of Arthur Schwartz's best songs. The Broadway treatment was not memorable. The show stayed open for twenty weeks, but the investment of $120,000 returned only $45,000. The comedy Foreigners appeared on December 5, 1939, but was cancelled after a few days. In April 1950 it was announced the Arch Selwyn, who had been absent from Broadway since 1939, was to co-produce the musical It's An Old Kansas Custom with Busby Berkeley and Alice Wellman Harris. There had been previous announcements of Selwyn productions that had not materialized. It's An Old Kansas Custom also never made it to the stage.

Archibald Selwyn died in Los Angeles, California, on June 21, 1959, at the age of 82, after a year of illness. He left a son, Billy Selwyn.

== Productions ==
Arch Selwyn's stage productions included:

- The Depths (Play, Drama) January 27, 1925 – Feb 1925
- The Monkey Talks (Play) December 28, 1925 – Mar 1926
- Charlot Revue (Musical, Revue) November 10, 1925 – March 6, 1926
- Fakir Rahman Bey (Special) May 25, 1926 – Jun 1926
- The Ghost Train (Play, Drama, Mystery) August 25, 1926 – Oct 1926
- The Garden of Eden (Play, Comedy) September 27, 1927 – Oct 1927
- This Year of Grace (Musical, Revue) November 7, 1928 – March 23, 1929
- Many Waters (Play, Drama) September 25, 1929 – Dec 1929
- The Middle Watch (Play, Comedy, Farce) October 16, 1929 – Nov 1929
- Bitter Sweet (Musical, Operetta) November 5, 1929 – March 22, 1930
- Wake Up and Dream (Musical, Revue) December 30, 1929 – April 26, 1930
- A Kiss of Importance (Play, Comedy) December 1, 1930 – Dec 1930
- The Devil Passes (Play, Comedy) January 4, 1932 – Mar 1932
- A Thousand Summers (Play, Romance) May 24, 1932 – Jul 1932
- Evensong (Play) January 31, 1933 – Feb 1933
- Forsaking All Others (Play, Comedy) March 1, 1933 – Jun 1933
- Lady Jane (Play, Comedy) September 10, 1934 – Oct 1934
- L'Aiglon (Play, Drama, Tragedy, Revival) November 3, 1934 – Dec 1934
- Continental Varieties (Musical, Revue) October 3, 1934 – November 13, 1934
- Conversation Piece (Play, Romantic Comedy) October 23, 1934 – December 8, 1934
- Revenge with Music (Musical) November 28, 1934 – April 27, 1935
- Foreigners (Play, Comedy) December 5, 1939 – December 9, 1939
