= The Villain Still Pursued Her =

1940 film

- Directed by: Edward F. Cline
- Written by: Elbert Franklin; Ethel La Blanche
- Produced by: Harold B. Franklin
- Starring: Richard Cromwell; Alan Mowbray; Buster Keaton; Anita Louise
- Cinematography: Lucien Ballard
- Edited by: Arthur Hilton
- Music by: Frank Tours
- Production company: Franklin-Black Productions
- Distributed by: RKO Radio Pictures
- Release date: October 11, 1940
- Running time: 66 minutes
- Country: United States
- Language: English
- Box office: $96,000

The Villain Still Pursued Her is a 1940 American comedy film directed by Edward F. Cline and starring Billy Gilbert and Buster Keaton. It is a parody of old stage melodramas but is based primarily on The Drunkard, a 19th-century prohibitionist play by William H. Smith that had also been lampooned in other productions, most notably in the 1934 W. C. Fields comedy The Old Fashioned Way.

The overall format of the film is that of a stage play, with much dialogue spoken directly to the camera.

Buster Keaton is notable in a speaking but minor supporting role as Dalton, a family friend.

== Plot ==
Mary Wilson lives with her mother in a cottage but cannot pay the mortgage. Mr. Cribbs, a mustachioed villain with cloak and cane, knocks on the door and spells out the Wilsons' financial position, suggesting that Mary should work in New York.

Cribbs hides while waiting for Mary to pass, but she also hides. A young man named Edward Middleton stops to pick up an injured bird and Cribbs questions him. Mary intervenes and instantly falls in love with Middleton. Mary marries Middleton, who extols the virtues of an alcohol-free life, but Cribbs tricks him into drinking rum, and Mary smells it on his breath.

Eight years later, Middleton is a drunkard. He has hidden bottles of whiskey and is able to down an entire bottle in ten seconds. He returns home to Mary and their daughter and chops down the cherry tree that his father had planted.

In New York in 1850, Middleton is living as a drunkard on the street, and Cribbs tries to trick him into deeper crime. Meanwhile, Mary lives alone in poverty with her daughter, her mother having died. Cribbs tries to press himself on Mary and she is saved by William Dalton.

Back in New York, Middleton is about to be arrested for drunkenness but is saved by a comic pie fight. Middleton then encounters the philanthropist Frederick Healy, who makes him sign a pledge of sobriety. Cribbs has Middleton forge the signature of Healy on a $5,000 check and he sends a boy to the bank to cash it, but Dalton exposes the crime.

Cribbs is exposed for various crimes and Middleton receives a certificate of sobriety.

== Cast ==
- Hugh Herbert as Frederick Healy
- Anita Louise as Mary Wilson
- Alan Mowbray as Mr. Cribbs
- Buster Keaton as William Dalton
- Joyce Compton as Hazel Dalton
- Richard Cromwell as Edward Middleton
- Billy Gilbert as Announcer
- Margaret Hamilton as Mrs. Wilson
- Diane Fisher as Julia
- Franklin Pangborn as Bartender
- Charles Judels as Dubois
- William Farnum as Vagabond

== See also ==
- The Villain Still Pursued Her, 1937 Terrytoons cartoon
