= Revenge with Music =

- Sheet music cover (cropped)
- Music: Arthur Schwartz
- Lyrics: Howard Dietz
- Book: Howard Dietz
- Productions: 1934 Broadway

Revenge with Music is a musical comedy with book and lyrics by Howard Dietz and music by Arthur Schwartz, that opened on Broadway in 1934. This was the first "book" musical by Dietz and Schwartz.

== Background and productions ==
Dietz, inspired by a trip to Spain, wrote his libretto based on the Spanish novel El sombrero de tres picos by Pedro Antonio de Alarcón. The duo had wanted to write something other than the revues they had been doing. The musical takes place in Spain in 1800, and involves a young Spanish couple, played by Libby Holman, as Maria, a young new bride, and Georges Metaxa as Carlos, her new groom. The story is based on a Spanish folk tale about seduction. Carlos seeks revenge on Don Emilio, the Spanish governor, for his attempt at seducing newly-wed Maria on their wedding night, by seducing the governor's willing wife, Doña Isabella.

Produced by Arch Selwyn and Harold B. Franklin, the Broadway production, opened on November 28, 1934, at the New Amsterdam Theatre for a total of 158 performances. The production had a brief closure from December 15, 1934, until December 24, 1934, to permit one of the leads, Charles Winninger, to recover from a broken ankle so that he could return to his role without having to use crutches.

The dance ensembles were by Michael Mordkin, direction by Theodore Komisarjevsky, orchestrations by Robert Russell Bennett. The cast starred Charles Winninger as Don Emilio, Ilka Chase as Doña Isabella, Libby Holman and Georges Metaxa.

The composers and members of the Broadway cast presented a 30-minute condensed version of Revenge with Music over the CBS radio network on the night of December 8, 1934.

The show was adapted for NBC radio's The Railroad Hour in 1950, with Gordon MacRae and Nadine Conner in the leads, and for NBC television's Colgate Comedy Hour in 1954, starring Ray Middleton, Ilona Massey and Harpo Marx.

A planned 1986 revival by Broadway's New Amsterdam Theatre Company was never staged, due to the death of the company's founding producer, Bill Tynes.

Although this show was considered a failure, it included two hit songs "You and the Night and the Music" and "If There Is Someone Lovelier Than You." The former was used again in The Band Wagon.

A Revenge with Music medley was the subject of the first recording session by Andre Kostelanetz and his orchestra, on November 9, 1934. It was Victor Records' 12-inch release No. 36142.

== Songs ==
Act I

- Flamenco – Dancing Soloists
- Never Marry a Dancer – Margarita
- If There Is Someone Lovelier Than You – Carlos
- In the Noonday Sun – Consuela and Ensemble
- That Fellow Manuelo – Alonzo, Carlos, Company, Dancing Soloists, Guitarists and Ensemble
- Think It Over – Don Emilio
- Maria – Carlos, Maria and Ensemble
- My Father Said – Carlos, Margarita and Ensemble
- You and the Night and the Music – Carlos and Maria

Act II

- Once in a While – Margarita, Miguel Rodriguez and Ensemble
- In the Middle of the Night – Alonzo and Ensemble
- Wand’ring Heart – Maria
