= The Blue Kitten =

1922 Broadway musical

- Lyrics: Otto Harbach and William Cary Duncan
- Book: Otto Harbach and William Carey Duncan
- Premiere: 1922: Selwyn Theatre

The Blue Kitten was a 1922 Broadway musical with a book and lyrics by Otto Harbach and William Cary Duncan and music by Rudolf Friml. It premiered at the Selwyn Theatre on January 13, 1922 and ran until May 13, 1922, totaling 140 performances.

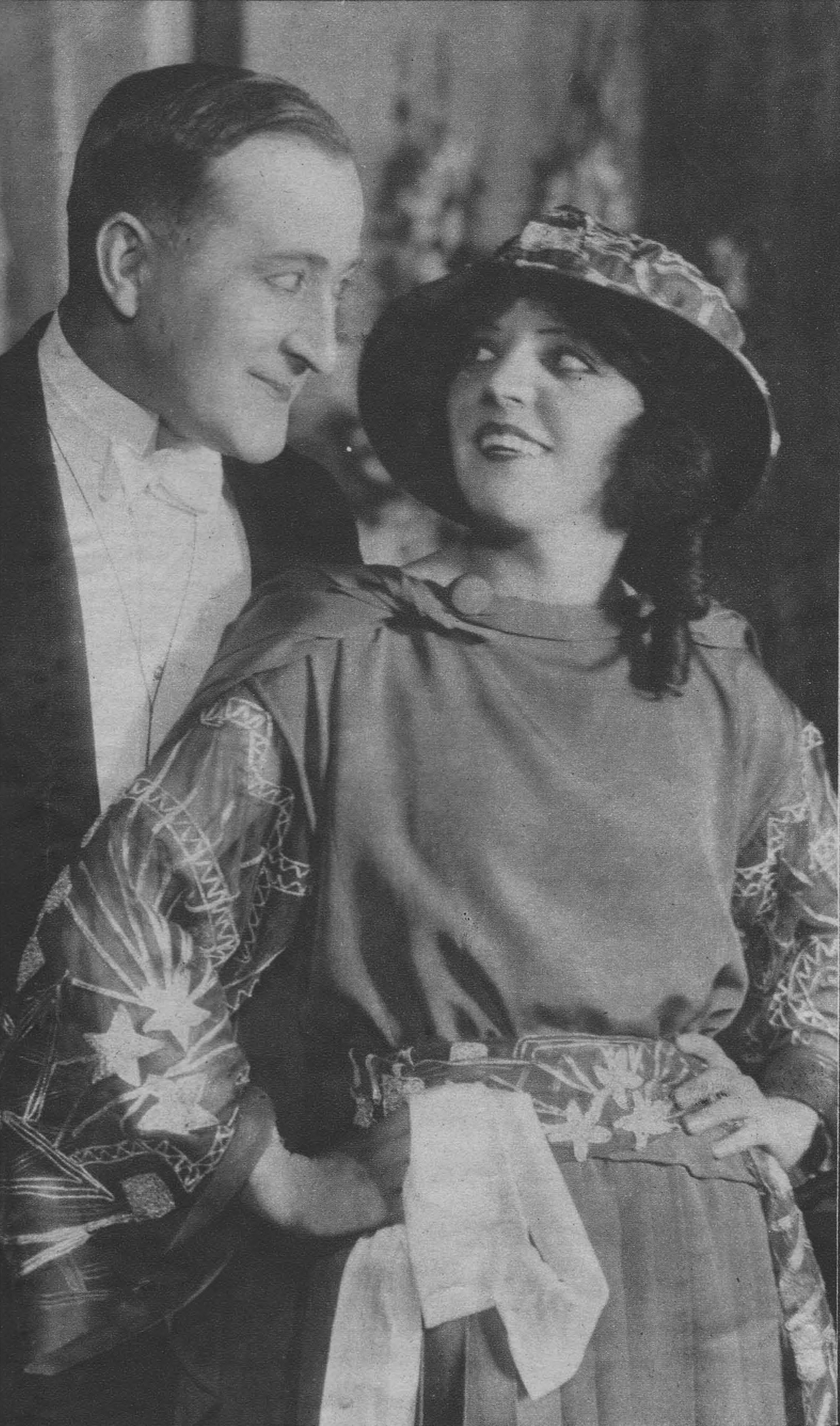
Victor Morley and Marion Sunshine in The Blue Kitten

The show was a "modest musical hit", although some critics called its score "inferior".

== Synopsis ==
Setting: The Foyer of "The Blue Kitten" Restaurant in Paris; At Vanderpop's Chateau at Fontainebleu; "The Blue Kitten" Café.

A headwaiter pretends to be upper-class so his daughter can marry a socialite.

== Cast ==
	1922 Broadway
Theodore Vanderpop	Joseph Cawthorn
Madelaine Vanderpop	Lorraine Manville
Mme. Lucile Vanderpop	Jean Newcombe
Fifi	Betty Barlow
Louis	Bill Hawkins
Durand	George Le Soir
Totoche	Lillian Lorraine
Giglais	Victor Morley
Marcelle	Carola Parson
Armand Duvelin	Douglas Stevenson
Cri Cri	Marion Sunshine
Popinet	Dallas Welford
Octave	Robert Woolsey

== Songs ==
- A 12 O'Clock Girl in a 9 O'Clock Town
- The Blue Kitten Blues
- Cutie
