= Todd Haimes Theatre =

Broadway theater in Manhattan, New York

- Selwyn Theatre (1918–2000); American Airlines Theatre (2000–2024)
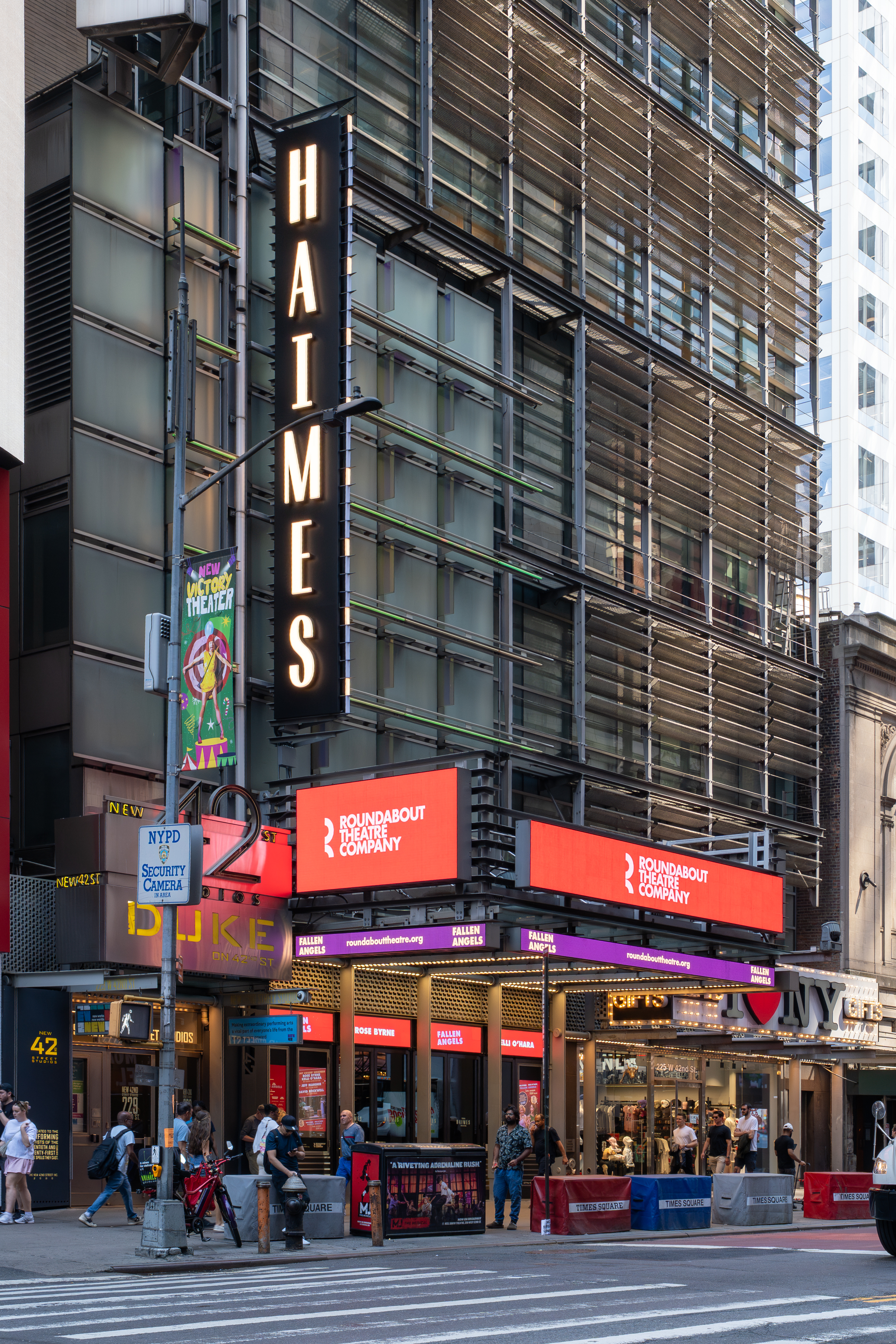
- (2026)
- Interactive map of Todd Haimes Theatre
- Address: 227 West 42nd Street; Manhattan, New York; United States
- Coordinates: 40°45′24.6″N 73°59′17.0″W
- Owner: City and State of New York (leased to New 42nd Street)
- Operator: Roundabout Theatre Company
- Capacity: 740
- Type: Broadway
- Production: The Imaginary Invalid
- Public transit: New York City Subway at Times Square–42nd Street and 42nd Street–Port Authority Bus Terminal

Construction
- Opened: October 2, 1918 (108 years ago)
- Reopened: June 30, 2000
- Architect: George Keister

Website
- www.roundabouttheatre.org

The Todd Haimes Theatre (previously known as the American Airlines Theatre and originally the Selwyn Theatre) is a Broadway theater at 227 West 42nd Street in the Theater District of Midtown Manhattan in New York City, New York, U.S. Built in 1918, it was designed by George Keister and developed by brothers Edgar and Archibald Selwyn, for whom the theater was originally named. The theater is owned by the city and state governments of New York and leased to New 42nd Street. It has 740 seats across two levels and is operated by Roundabout Theatre Company.

The Selwyn Theatre was designed in the Italian Renaissance style, with a brick-and-terracotta facade. The auditorium, which is on 43rd Street, had been accessed from the six-story Selwyn Building on 42nd Street, which collapsed at the end of 1997. The modern theater is accessed through the ten-story New 42nd Street Building, which has an illuminated steel-and-glass facade. The fan-shaped auditorium is designed in a blue-and-gold color scheme and has a shallow balcony, box seats, and murals. There are lounges for Roundabout subscribers above the auditorium and technical spaces in the basement. In addition, the New 42nd Street Building contains offices, rehearsal rooms, and an off-Broadway theater above the lobby.

The theater opened on October 2, 1918, with Jane Cowl's Information Please, and it initially hosted legitimate musical and dramatic productions. Arch Selwyn presented revues such as Wake Up and Dream (1929) and Three's a Crowd (1930). After Arch Selwyn's bankruptcy in 1934, the Selwyn became a cinema; the Brandt family took over the theater in 1937 and operated it for the next five decades. The Selwyn largely showed movies, except in 1949–1950, when legitimate plays alternated with film screenings. There were several proposals to redevelop theaters along 42nd Street in the 1980s. New 42nd Street took over the Selwyn and several neighboring theaters in 1990, leasing the Selwyn to the Roundabout Theatre Company in 1997. Following the collapse of the Selwyn Building, the theater was redesigned as part of the New 42nd Street Building. The theater reopened on June 30, 2000, after being renamed for American Airlines, which had bought the theater's naming rights. In June 2023, Roundabout announced that the theater would be renamed after Roundabout's artistic director, Todd Haimes, who had died in April of that year.

== Site ==
The Todd Haimes Theatre is at 229 West 42nd Street, on the northern sidewalk between Eighth Avenue and Seventh Avenue, at the southern end of Times Square in the Midtown Manhattan neighborhood of New York City, New York, U.S. The theater occupies two land lots. The main entrance and lobby are in the New 42nd Street Building on 42nd Street, while the auditorium is on a separate lot to the north on 43rd Street. The New 42nd Street Building occupies a rectangular lot covering around 7,538 ft^{2} (700.3 m^{2}), with a frontage of 75 ft (23 m) on 42nd Street (Note: A map published by New 42nd Street indicates that the New 42nd Street Building's and American Airlines Theatre's lobbies cover the western part of the site, measuring 37 ft 6 in (11.43 m) wide. A storefront covers the eastern part, measuring 37 ft 5 in (11.40 m) wide.) and a depth of 100 ft 5 in (30.61 m). The auditorium is also on a rectangular lot covering 9,708 ft^{2} (901.9 m^{2}), with a frontage of 96 ft 8 in (29.46 m) on 43rd Street and a depth of 100 feet 5 inches. Originally, the theater had a frontage of 37 ft (11 m) on 42nd Street and 96 feet on 43rd Street, with a depth of 100 feet from both streets.

The theater shares the block with the Hotel Carter building to the west, as well as the Lyric, Times Square, and New Victory theaters and 3 Times Square to the east. Other nearby buildings include 255 West 43rd Street, the St. James Theatre, and the Hayes Theater to the northwest; 229 West 43rd Street and 1501 Broadway to the north; 5 Times Square and the New Amsterdam Theatre to the southeast; and the Candler Building to the south.

The surrounding area is part of Manhattan's Theater District and contains many Broadway theaters. In the first two decades of the 20th century, eleven venues for Legitimate theatre were built within one block of West 42nd Street between Seventh and Eighth Avenues. The New Amsterdam, Harris, Liberty, Eltinge, and Lew Fields theaters occupied the south side of the street. The original Lyric and Apollo theaters (combined into the current Lyric Theatre), as well as the Times Square, Victory, Selwyn (now Todd Haimes), and Victoria theaters, occupied the north side. These venues were mostly converted to movie theaters by the 1930s, and many of them had been relegated to showing pornography by the 1970s.

== Design ==
The Todd Haimes Theatre was originally named the Selwyn Theatre, designed by George Keister and constructed in 1918 for brothers Edgar and Archibald Selwyn. The Selwyn was originally decorated in the Italian Renaissance style. The original design plans are preserved at the Shuger Archives. The current design dates to a late-1990s renovation, when the New 42nd Street Building (designed by Platt Byard Dovell) was constructed around it. The Todd Haimes is one of three Broadway theaters operated by the nonprofit Roundabout Theatre Company; the others are Studio 54 and the Stephen Sondheim Theatre.

=== Facade ===
==== Original facade ====
The theater had originally been accessed from the six-story Selwyn Building on 42nd Street, which collapsed at the end of 1997. The building's 42nd Street elevation was made of brick with terracotta trim. One architectural publication described the building as also containing "generous glass surfaces to light the interior". A marquee overhung the theater's entrance on 42nd Street. Six windows on the second story, directly above the marquee, were grouped together within a wide window frame. On each of the third through fifth stories, the windows were divided vertically into five bays, with the center bay being separated from the outer two bays on each side by piers. The windows on different stories were separated by decorated spandrels. An entablature with the words "Selwyn Building" ran above the fifth story, with a triangular pediment in the center. The sixth story was grouped into two bays of three windows, and a sign with the letter "S" was hung in between these windows. Above was a cornice with modillions, as well as a stone balustrade.

The 43rd Street elevation of the theater retains its original facade. Like the original Selwyn Building, it has brick, terracotta, and stonework. This elevation contains exit-only doors; the main entrance is through the current New 42nd Street Building. The stage door is also on 43rd Street.

==== Current facade ====
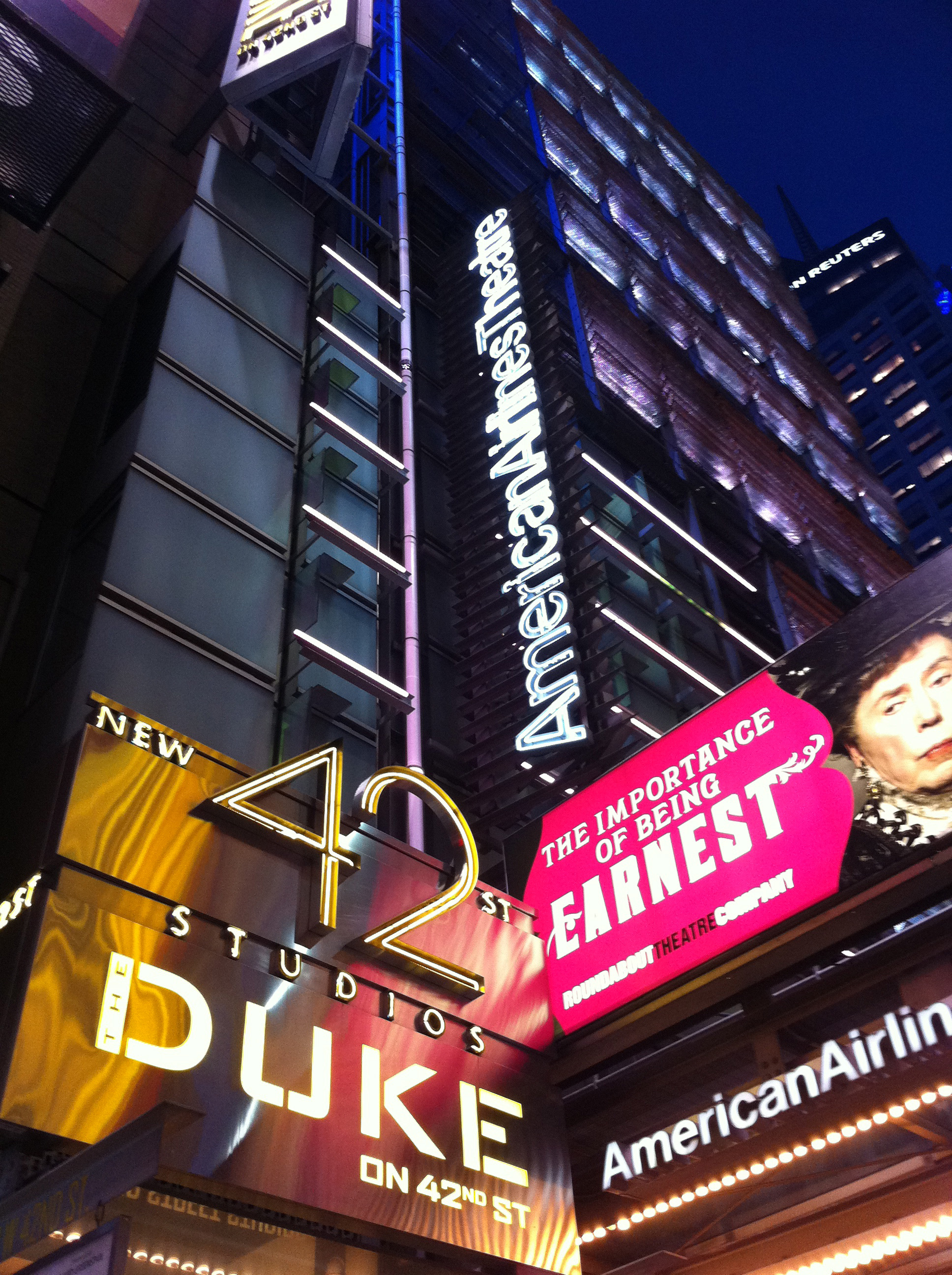
Night view of the building

The new facade on 42nd Street is part of the New 42nd Street Building. Initial plans for the building in 1997 had called for the original terracotta facade of the Selwyn Building to be preserved as a separate structure. The New 42nd Street facade would have been constructed as a glass box with two setbacks, contrasting with the Selwyn's facade, which rose straight from the street. The building's 42nd Street elevation would have been covered with a projecting angular steel-and-glass "armature". Lighting designer Anne Militello had also been hired to design color-changing illumination for the New 42nd Street Building. A marquee and entrance to the Selwyn Theatre, as well as a storefront, would have been placed at the base of the building. Plans for the facade of the New 42nd Street Building were modified slightly after the Selwyn Building's facade collapsed.

The 13,000 ft^{2} (1,200 m^{2}) facade is illuminated by 300 computer-controlled lamps, part of an illumination scheme created by Anne Militello. The building's 42nd Street elevation is covered in stainless steel bars, which act as brises soleil, screening the southern elevation from sunlight. The steel bars contain uplights that can be illuminated in many colors; these reflect onto a blue background. There are 54 rows of bars in total. Behind the bars is the building's glass curtain wall, which overlooks the studios inside. The leftmost portion of the second through fourth stories, marking the former site of the Selwyn Building, is left bare. This section measures 32 by 32 ft (9.8 by 9.8 m) across and consists of translucent and reflective glass panels. It uses dichroic glass, which can change colors based on the lighting conditions. There is a "light pipe" along the western part of the facade, measuring 175 ft (53 m) tall; it was designed by James Carpenter.

The building's illumination scheme allows it to blend in with other structures with billboards on Times Square. Under a zoning ordinance, the developers of new buildings had to install large signs facing Times Square, but New 42nd Street had not wanted to install a large billboard. Joseph Giovaninni of New York magazine wrote of the design: "The architects may have designed only what is, in the end, a familiar glass box, but with their totally original use of light they infused it with new life." Elaine Louie of The New York Times wrote that the structure "proves that a glass building can have a 21st-century reason for its transparency and not just be a nod to old-fashioned Modernism".

=== Interior ===
==== Auditorium ====
The Todd Haimes Theatre has a fan-shaped layout, which led one critic to observe that "a whisper in the farthest part of the stage may be heard at the most remote seat". While the theater originally had 1,180 seats, it has had 740 seats since the late 1990s. The modern theater has wider seats than the original Selwyn, necessitating the reduction in the number of seats. The original upholstery was replaced with vinyl in the mid-20th century, then changed to dark red in the late 1990s. The Selwyn was originally decorated in old Italian blue and antique gold. The theater had also contained Alps-green and Pavanazzo marbles, as well as murals and gold-leaf ornamentation. In the mid-20th century, the theater was repainted in red and cream. It was later renovated to feature a dark red color scheme, with hues of blue and green from the murals.

The orchestra level seats are arranged in 14 rows. The orchestra is more steeply raked than in the original design, and it contains two layers of sound insulation under the back rows. Two side aisles divide the orchestra seating into three sections. The Todd Haimes has a single balcony. At the time of the Selwyn's construction, many new theaters were being built with one balcony, rather than two, to make it appear more cozy. The balcony is even shallower than the orchestra, with seven rows of 40 seats each, or 280 seats in total. It has a continental seating configuration without any intermediate aisles. A technical booth is installed on the rear wall. The orchestra and balcony were connected by stairs with carved yellow marble balustrades. The walls were wainscoted in blue-veined marble. When the theater was renovated in 2000, it had 23 wheelchair-accessible seating locations; this was increased to 28 accessible seats as part of a 2025 renovation.

At mezzanine level, there are box seats within arched openings on either side of the auditorium; the rear box is higher than the front box. Above the boxes, sail vaults ride to the ceiling. There were five Italianate murals above the boxes and the proscenium opening. Arthur Brounet had painted the murals, which depicted various performers in classical garb, such as jesters. The murals were painted over in the mid-20th century before EverGreene Architectural Arts restored them in the late 1990s. The murals on house right were restored using historical photographs, as no trace existed of the murals there. A New York Daily News critic said the restored murals have "a graciousness modern design seldom achieves".

The stage measures 50 ft (15 m) deep and 75 ft (23 m) wide. The stage contains traps and three removable sections. The front of the stage can be disassembled to accommodate an orchestra pit measuring 40 by 10 ft (12.2 by 3.0 m) or a row of orchestra seating. A red house curtain and a fire curtain were also installed. The auditorium's roof is supported by four columns, two each in the front and in the back. When the theater was rebuilt in the 1990s, the columns were extended upward by 25 ft (7.6 m) to support two additional stories. The auditorium's dome is suspended from two trusses that run between the front and rear pairs of columns. The dome is painted blue and has a chandelier at its center. Smaller blue domes are placed near the rear of the ceiling. In front of the proscenium is a truss and rigging points for theatrical equipment. The rigging system includes 35 line sets. The front of the theater contains a safety beam that can accommodate up to 300 lb (140 kg) of equipment; two motors can pull the beam along a truss measuring 40 ft (12 m) wide.

==== Lobbies and lounges ====
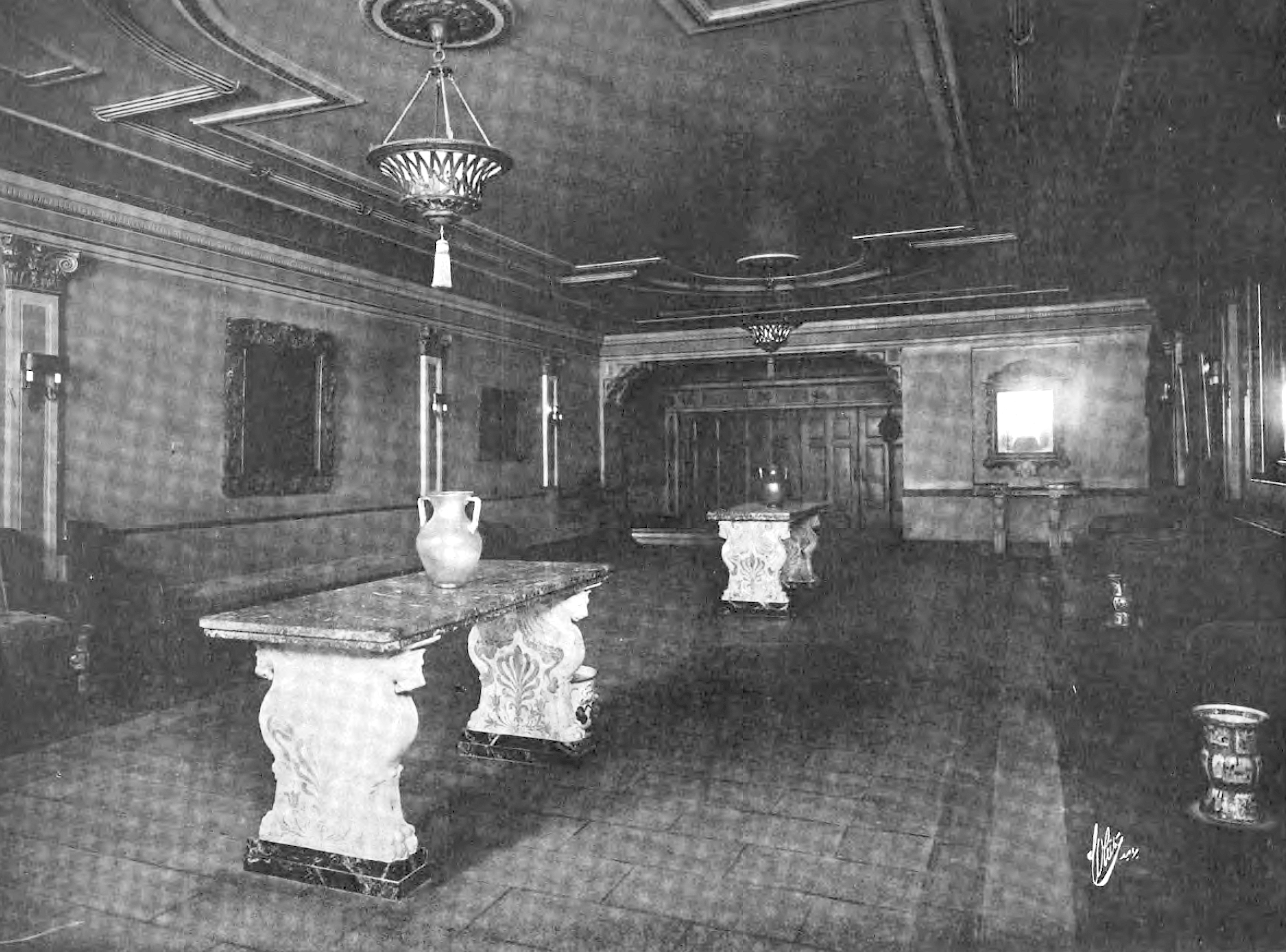
Interior of the Selwyn Theatre's original lounge

The first floor of the Selwyn Building was almost entirely occupied by the theater's lobby, lounges, and restrooms, while the other five floors were used as offices. The lounges and lobby were decorated in the same way as the auditorium, with ornate foyers, lounges, and restrooms. The Selwyn Theatre's design had several innovations, including separate smoking rooms for men and women, as well as a shower and telephone in each dressing room. The theater was retrofitted with a heating, ventilation, and air conditioning system when it was rebuilt.

When the theater was rebuilt in the 1990s, new spaces were constructed both above and below the original theater. A 13 ft-deep (4.0 m) basement was built beneath the existing auditorium. It contains classrooms, lounges, restrooms, storage space, and technical rooms. The Todd Haimes' dressing and wardrobe room, mechanical spaces, green room, and public restrooms are in a mechanical core within the New 42nd Street Building. Three elevators and two staircases were built when the theater was reconstructed. One of the elevators is housed within an old fire escape shaft. On the 42nd Street side of the New 42nd Street Building, a 15 ft-deep (4.6 m) space was added for backstage areas.

Two stories were built above the roof, with reception, kitchen/dining, and bar areas; they are supported by the four columns in the auditorium. The additional stories are placed on a separate structure that does not touch the roof of the auditorium. The upper stories contain a subscribers' lobby facing 43rd Street, as well as a smaller private lounge for large donors. The subscribers' lobby, covering 3,500 ft^{2} (330 m^{2}) or 4,000 ft^{2} (370 m^{2}), was originally named for snack company Nabisco, which had paid $500,000 for naming rights. This lobby consists of a foyer with a carpeted floor, as well as a main area with a gold-and-blue ceiling and gilded wall mirrors. The Wall Street Journal reported in 2015 that the subscribers' lobby was often unused, since many subscribers instead gathered in the ground-floor lobby during intermissions.

The private lounge is immediately above the subscribers' lobby. It was originally intended for donors who contributed over $1,500 annually to the Roundabout Theatre Company. It is known as the Langworthy Lounge, after donor Norma S. Langworthy. The space can fit 40 people seated for a dinner or 70 people standing for a cocktail reception. As part of a 2025 renovation, a multi-use space was added to the fifth floor.

==== Other spaces ====
The building also contains 84,000 ft^{2} (7,800 m^{2}) of rehearsal and performing space for New 42nd Street. There are two studio/reception spaces and 14 rehearsal rooms. The New 42nd Street Studios, as the rehearsal rooms are called, span five stories. The studios contain 13-to-15 ft-high (4.0-to-4.6 m) ceilings, sprung floors, and full-height mirrors. The other stories were designed with lower ceilings. The office space in the building is leased to nonprofit theatrical groups. Roundabout has its offices there, as do the Williamstown Theatre Festival and Parsons Dance Company. The building also houses The Duke on 42nd Street, a 199-seat off-Broadway theater, on the second floor. It is named for philanthropist Doris Duke, who donated $3.5 million toward its construction. The Duke on 42nd Street is housed within an enclosure measuring 57 by 49.5 ft (17.4 by 15.1 m) across and 19.5 ft (5.9 m) high. The building's ground level contains 2,500 square feet (230 m^{2}) of retail space next to the Todd Haimes Theatre's lobby.

== History ==
Times Square became the epicenter for large-scale theater productions between 1900 and the Great Depression. Manhattan's theater district had begun to shift from Union Square and Madison Square during the first decade of the 20th century. From 1901 to 1920, forty-three theaters were built around Broadway in Midtown Manhattan. George Keister had designed several of these Broadway theaters, including the Selwyn, Astor, Belasco, and Earl Carroll theaters, in addition to other commissions such as Harlem's Apollo Theater. The Selwyn brothers, meanwhile, developed several Broadway theaters on 42nd Street. Before the Selwyn Theatre was developed, the brothers operated the Harris Theatre on 42nd Street.

=== Original Broadway run ===
==== Construction and opening ====
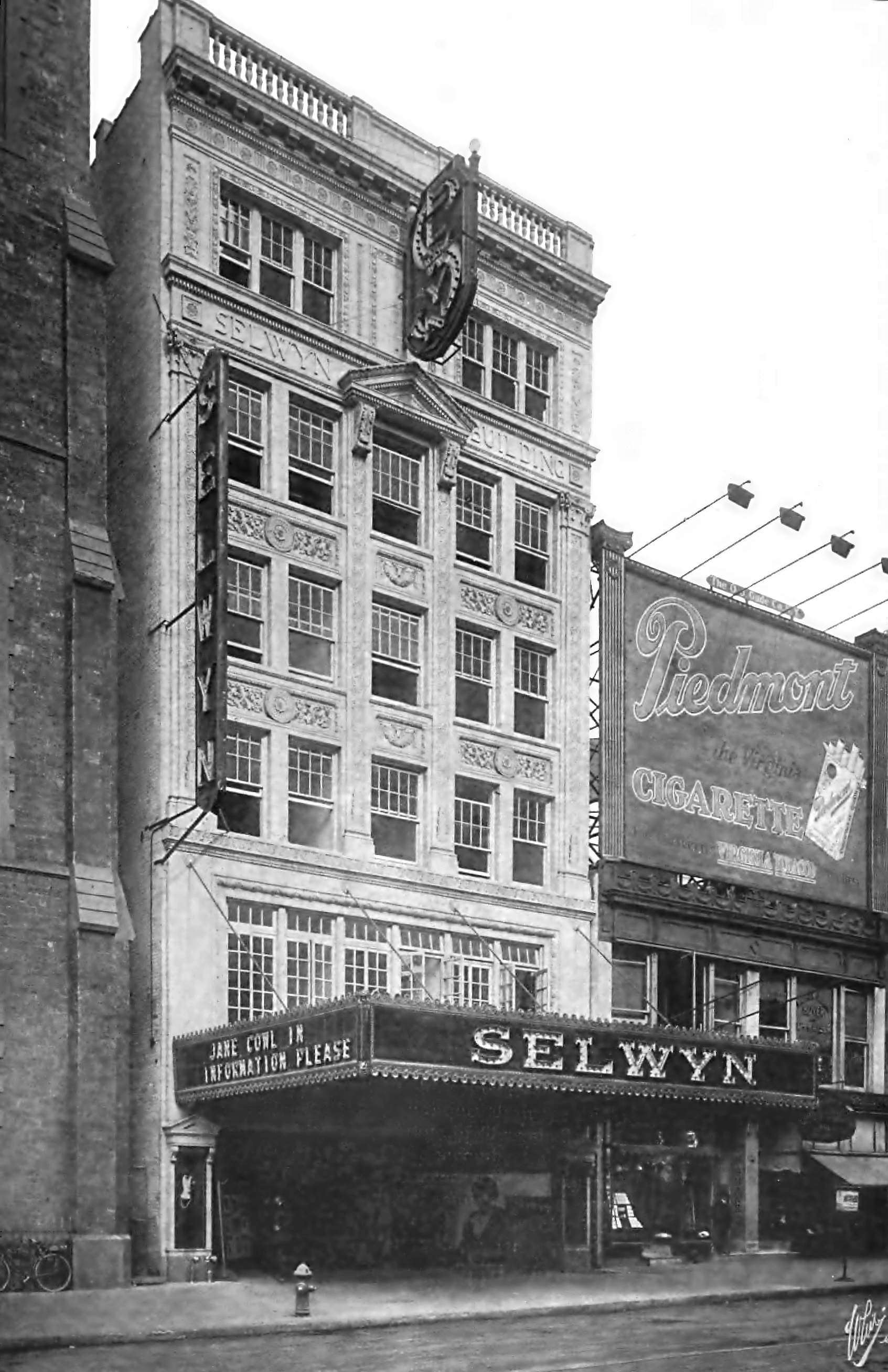
Selwyn Theatre in 1918, showing the original facade

At the beginning of January 1917, the Selwyn brothers announced their intention to build a theater on 240–248 West 43rd Street, with an entrance on 42nd Street. The theater was planned to have 1,100 seats and, according to The New York Times, "novel features" such as rehearsal rooms and a women's lounge. In May 1918, the Selwyns filed plans with the Manhattan Bureau of Buildings for their theater, to be designed by George Keister. In addition, Keister designed a renovation for the existing three-story building on 42nd Street, owned by Mary L. Cassidy, into an office structure. Crosby Gaige would oversee the theater and office building's construction. The project was expected to cost $200,000 in total, and the theater would be known as the Selwyn. At the time, it was one of three theaters being erected on the block of 42nd Street between Seventh and Eighth Avenues, which already had nine theaters.

By September 1917, the site of the Selwyn Theatre was being cleared. The Selwyn brothers had announced two additional theaters on an adjoining site to the east, later the Apollo (42nd Street) and Times Square theaters. In February 1918, the Selwyn brothers agreed to give the exclusive booking rights for their plays to the Shubert family. Thereafter, the Shuberts held a partial interest in the three theaters that the Selwyns were constructing. The gangster Arnold Rothstein reportedly provided some financing for the project. Work was halted temporarily in early 1918 due to legal issues and material shortages. Construction of the office building resumed that April, at which point the auditorium had been completed. The same month, the Selwyns announced that the theater's first production would be a play written by Jane Cowl. By that July, the Selwyn brothers' company Selwyn & Co. indicated it would relocate its offices to the new building. Edgar Selwyn's wife Margaret Mayo also had an office in the building.

The theater informally opened for media tours on October 1, 1918, and Cowl's Information Please opened at the theater the next day. To mark the theater's official opening, the Selwyn brothers decorated the stage curtain with World War I Allied nations' flags, and they played the United States' national anthem, "The Star-Spangled Banner", before the first performance. Information Please flopped with 46 performances. This was followed the same November by The Crowded Hour, in which Cowl also starred. Because of the theater's acoustic qualities, Selwyn & Co. announced in December 1918 that it would host concerts in the Selwyn on Sundays. The first such concert took place on December 30, 1918. This was followed in 1919 by Rudolf Friml and Otto Harbach's musical Tumble In and Eugene Walter's play The Challenge. The first hit at the theater was George V. Hobart's musical Buddies, which opened in October 1919 and ran for 269 performances over the next eight months.

==== 1920s and early 1930s ====
Oscar Hammerstein II, Otto Harbach, and Frank Mandel's musical Tickle Me opened at the Selwyn in 1920. This was followed the next year by the revue Snapshots of 1921, as well as W. Somerset Maugham's comedy The Circle, the latter of which was the theater's first non-musical hit. The theater also hosted films around this time, including a Greek war film. In 1922, the Selwyn brothers purchased the site of the Selwyn Building on 42nd Street from Mary Cassidy. Most of the Selwyn's productions in 1922 and early 1923 were not hits. The musical The Blue Kitten opened in January 1922 with Joseph Cawthorn and Lillian Lorraine, followed by Partners Again that May. At the end of that year, the theater installed a Teleview projection system for screening stereoscopic motion pictures. The theater hosted three short-lived productions in early 1923. The next hit was the Marc Connelly and George S. Kaufman musical Helen of Troy, New York, which opened in June 1923 and ran for several months before moving to the Times Square Theatre. Also popular was the musical Battling Buttler, which arrived that October and ran for nearly 300 performances.

French impresario André Charlot hosted his popular Charlot Revue at the Selwyn during early 1924. It was followed immediately afterward by the musical Kid Boots, which had transferred from the Earl Carroll and ran for 489 total performances. The Selwyn housed several flops in early 1925, including The Gorilla. Charlot hosted another edition of his revue later that year, which continued for 138 performances. The Shubert brothers also negotiated to operate the Selwyn, but that deal was canceled in September 1925 because the Selwyn brothers felt they could manage the theater themselves. The hypnotist Fakir Rahman Bey performed at the Selwyn in May 1926, and the comedy The Man from Toronto had a short run the same year. George White took over the Selwyn's operation that July. Afterward, the theater hosted the musical Castles in the Air, which opened that September and ran for 160 performances. That October, Arch Selwyn assumed responsibility for the theater's bookings for one year. The play The Constant Nymph also opened at the Selwyn in 1926; despite a successful West End run, it stayed on Broadway for a relatively short 148 performances.

The theater's bookings in 1927 consisted of several short runs, such as The Mating Season, The Manhatters, The Garden of Eden, and Nightstick. The next hit was Kaufman and Edna Ferber's The Royal Family, which opened in December 1927 and ran for nearly a year. By then, a lack of steady income led the Selwyn brothers to host shows on Sunday nights, when most other Broadway theaters did not operate. In addition to legitimate bookings, the Selwyn hosted events such as a debate about Benito Mussolini. Under Arch Selwyn, the theater became known for hosting revues. In November 1928, Arch Selwyn brought Noël Coward's musical This Year of Grace to the theater for 158 performances. The revue Keep It Clean opened in June 1929 but lasted only a short time. More successful was Cole Porter's Wake Up and Dream, which opened that December and ran for 138 performances.

The Selwyn hosted the revue Three's a Crowd with Clifton Webb in October 1930, which lasted 272 performances. The Selwyn brothers received a $650,000 loan for the office building and theater in 1931. At the onset of the Great Depression, many Broadway theaters were impacted by declining attendance. The Selwyn Theatre was among the venues that suffered, hosting 11 consecutive flops from 1931 to 1933. The Dry Dock Savings Bank, which had given the Selwyn brothers a mortgage loan on the theater, had stipulated that it would not foreclose on the mortgage as long as the brothers could produce a hit. Arch Selwyn hired Crosby Gaige to produce several shows, but none of them lasted for very long; one play, Ragged Army, ran for just two days.

=== Movie theater and decline ===
==== Early use and attempted live-show revival ====
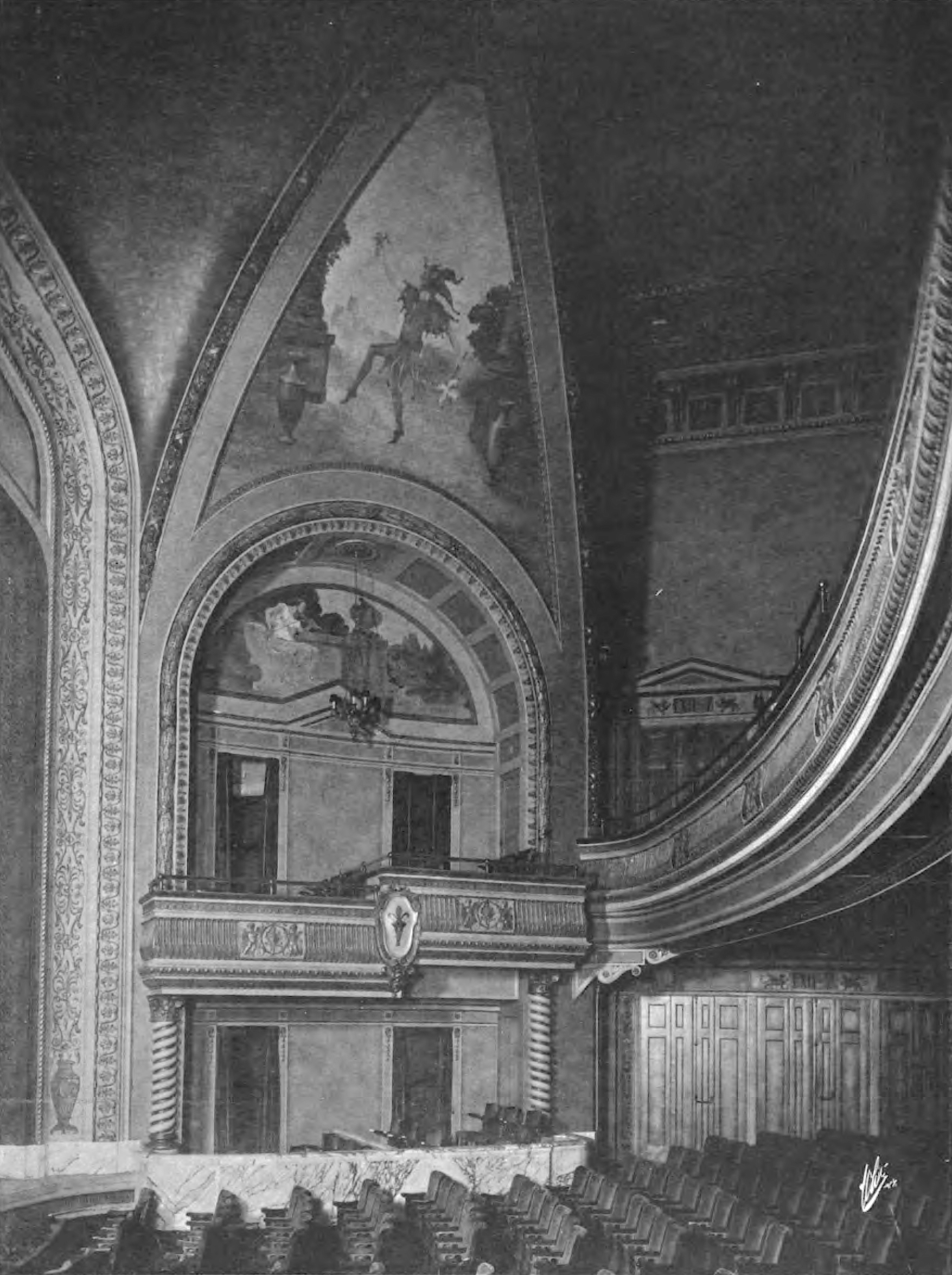
View of boxes inside the Selwyn Theatre

The theater was leased in April 1934 to the Anru Amusement Corporation, which started operating the Selwyn as a movie house the following month. The Selwyn brothers never again hosted a show at the theater. Arch Selwyn filed for bankruptcy shortly afterward; one of his debts was secured by a mortgage on the theater and office building. The theater was placed for sale at a foreclosure auction, and Dry Dock Savings Bank bought the theater in August 1934 for $610,000. Later the same year, Joseph Fitzula renovated the Selwyn Building. Among the office building's tenants at the time was the National Shakespearean Studio of Dramatic Art. The Brandt family bought the Selwyn Theatre and offices in 1937, subject to an existing first mortgage loan of $620,000. The theater operated under a "grindhouse" format, with films running continuously. This was part of a decline in the Broadway theater industry in the mid-20th century; from 1931 to 1950, the number of legitimate theaters decreased from 68 to 30. The box seats were removed when the Selwyn became a movie theater.

Billy Rose considered restoring either the Selwyn or the Apollo to legitimate use in 1943. By then, the ten theaters along 42nd Street between Seventh and Eighth Avenues were all showing movies; this led Variety to call the block the "biggest movie center of the world". The Brandts owned seven of these theaters, while the Cinema circuit operated the other three. The Brandt theaters included the Selwyn, Apollo, Times Square, Lyric, and Victory theaters on the north side of 42nd Street, as well as the Eltinge and Liberty theaters on the south side. The Brandts used the Selwyn as their flagship theater on 42nd Street, screening first runs of Loews movies; some of the Selwyn's films moved to the Liberty afterward. Several producers offered to stage legitimate productions in these theaters, but none of the offers were successful. William Brandt indicated in 1946 that he might replace the theaters on the north side of 42nd Street with a skyscraper. By then, there was a shortage of new films in the theaters along 42nd Street, which led to decreased attendance.

In August 1949, George Brandt suggested running live shows in their 42nd Street theaters, though his father William was initially against it. Even so, the Brandts announced the same December that they would stage a live show at the Selwyn, The Respectful Prostitute, the first such show in 15 years. There were five performances on most days and four on Sundays, presented in conjunction with the film Flame of Youth. Two casts were hired, rotating between performances. To accommodate the mixed format, the plays had to be less than an hour long, though the Brandts had difficulty finding such short plays. Though ticket prices ranged from 38 cents in the morning to $1.10 on Sunday nights, the theater earned $24,000 during The Respectful Prostitute's first week, compared to $8,000 weekly before the new policy was implemented. Ninety percent of the audience members had never seen a play before. The Respectful Prostitute closed in February 1950 and was followed by a dramatization of the film Ladies' Night in a Turkish Bath. This show ran for four weeks before going on tour.

==== 1950s to 1970s ====
The Selwyn returned to showing movies exclusively in early 1950, after two months of alternating films and live shows. Though the stage-and-film format had the potential to be lucrative, there were not enough plays that fit the Brandts' criteria. William Brandt said in 1953 that any of his 42nd Street theaters could be converted to a legitimate house within 24 hours' notice, but producers did not take up his offer. By the late 1950s, the Selwyn was classified as a "move-over house", displaying features immediately after they ran at the Lyric, one of the street's two first-run theaters (the other being the New Amsterdam). As a move-over house, the Selwyn charged less than the first-run theaters but more than the "reissue houses" that screened old films. The Selwyn and the other 42nd Street theaters operated from 8 a.m. to 3 a.m., with three shifts of workers. The ten theaters on the block attracted about five million visitors a year between them.

The 42nd Street Company was established in 1961 to operate the Brandts' seven theaters on 42nd Street. By the early 1960s, the surrounding block had decayed, but many of the old theater buildings from the block's heyday remained, including the Selwyn. Martin Levine and Richard Brandt took over the 42nd Street Company in 1972. The Selwyn still operated as a move-over house, screening films that had previously played at the Lyric. The other five theaters showed a variety of genres, though Levine said none of the company's 42nd Street theaters showed hardcore porn. The Brandts' theaters had a combined annual gross of about $2 million and operated nearly the entire day. However, the area was in decline; the Brandts' theaters only had three million visitors by 1977, about half of the number in 1963. The Brandts' movie theaters on 42nd Street continued to operate through the mid-1980s, at which point the Selwyn was primarily screening successful mainstream films, interspersed with double bills of exploitation films.

=== Restoration ===
The 42nd Street Development Corporation had been formed in 1976 to discuss plans for redeveloping Times Square. The same year, the City University of New York's Graduate Center hosted an exhibition with photographs of the Selwyn and other theaters to advocate for the area's restoration. Another plan, in 1978, called for restoring the Selwyn, Apollo, and Harris for opera and dance, rather than for theatrical purposes. Other nearby buildings would have been razed to create a park. The Brandt family's Brandt Organization converted the Apollo to legitimate use in 1979; the company also planned to convert the Lyric and Selwyn, but there were few bookings for either theater.

==== Preservation attempts ====
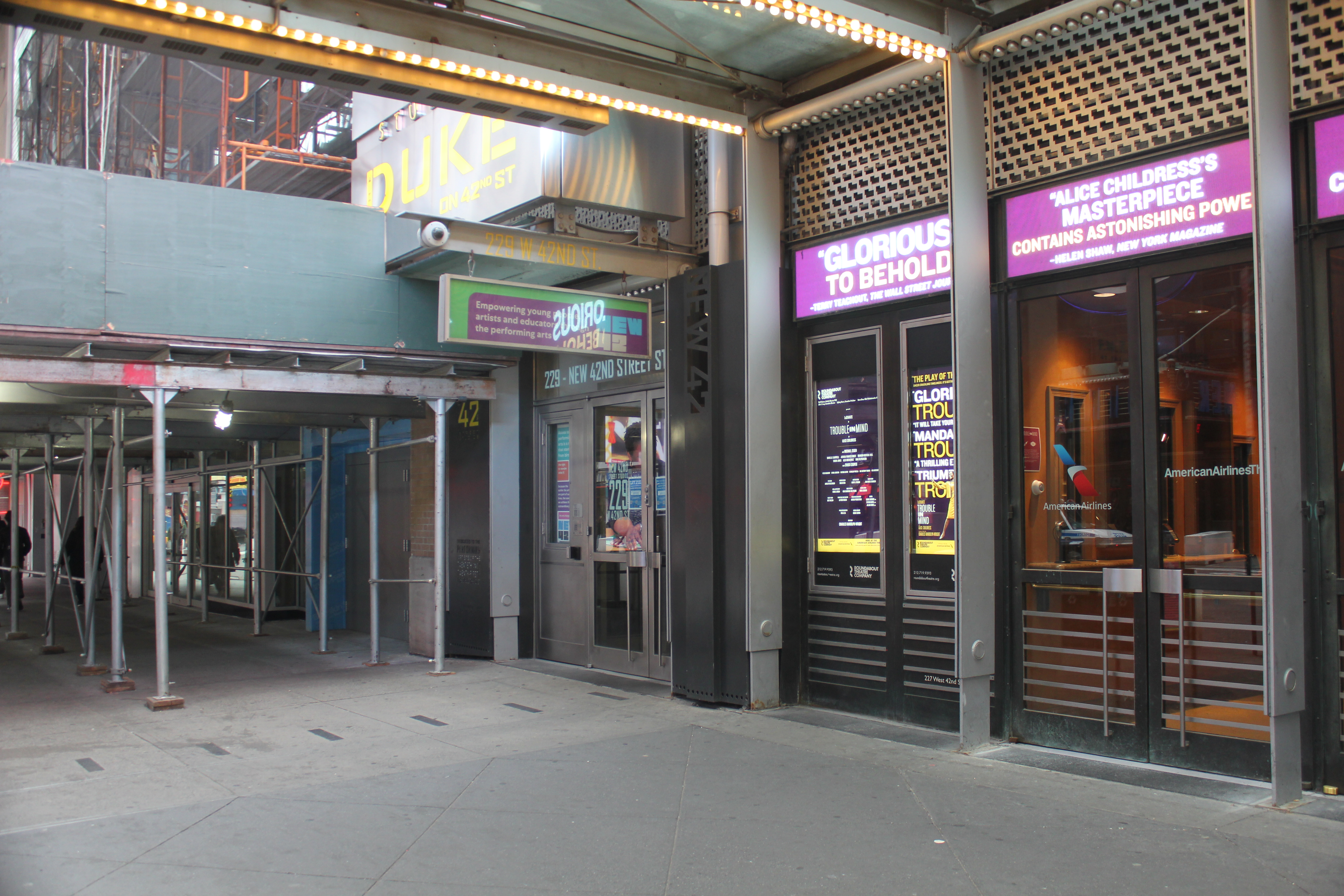
Theater entrance

Another plan, called the City at 42nd Street, was announced in December 1979 as part of a proposal to restore West 42nd Street around Times Square. Under the plan, the Selwyn would have been preserved, and some of the other theaters would have been modified. Mayor Ed Koch wavered in his support of the plan, criticizing it as a "Disneyland on 42nd Street". Subsequently, Hugh Hardy conducted a report on 42nd Street's theaters in 1980. His report, in conjunction with a movement opposing the demolition of the nearby Helen Hayes and Morosco theaters, motivated the New York City Landmarks Preservation Commission (LPC) to survey fifty of Midtown Manhattan's extant theaters in the early 1980s.

The LPC started to consider protecting theaters, including the Selwyn Theatre, with discussions continuing over the next several years. While the LPC granted landmark status to many Broadway theaters starting in 1987, it deferred decisions on the exterior and interior of the Selwyn Theatre. Further discussion of the landmark designations was delayed for several decades. In late 2015, the LPC hosted public hearings on whether to designate the Selwyn (by then American Airlines) and six other theaters as landmarks. The LPC rejected the designations in February 2016, as the theaters were already subject to historic-preservation regulations set by the state government.

==== Redevelopment proposals ====
The Urban Development Corporation (UDC), an agency of the New York state government, then proposed redeveloping the area around a portion of West 42nd Street in 1981. The plan centered around four towers that were to be built at 42nd Street's intersections with Broadway and Seventh Avenue, developed by Park Tower Realty and the Prudential Insurance Company of America. (Note: The sites were: Northwest corner of 42nd Street and Seventh Avenue: now 3 Times Square; Northeast corner of 42nd Street and Broadway: now 4 Times Square; Southwest corner of 42nd Street and Seventh Avenue: now 5 Times Square; South side of 42nd Street between Seventh Avenue and Broadway: now 7 Times Square (Times Square Tower)) The Brandt family planned to submit a bid to redevelop some of the theaters they owned on 42nd Street. In June 1982, the Brandts' five theaters on the north side of 42nd Street, including the Selwyn, were added to the redevelopment plan. In August 1984, the UDC granted Jujamcyn Theaters the right to operate the Selwyn, Apollo, and Lyric theaters; as part of the same project, the Times Square Theatre would have become retail space. In response, Brandt and Cine Theater Corp. sued the UDC, claiming that the moves shut out independent theatrical operators, but a state court dismissed the lawsuit. Michael J. Lazar would have renovated the four theaters for Jujamcyn, but the city and state removed him from the project in 1986 following a parking scandal. The Brandts also leased all their movie theaters on 42nd Street, including the Selwyn, to the Cine 42nd Street Corporation in 1986.

From 1987 to 1989, Park Tower and Prudential hired Robert A. M. Stern to conduct a study on the Apollo, Lyric, Selwyn, Times Square, and Victory theaters on the north side of 42nd Street. Stern devised three alternatives for the five theaters. City and state officials announced plans for the five theaters, along with the Liberty Theatre on the south side of 42nd Street, in September 1988. Stern presented a model of his plan the next month. The plan called for reducing the size of the Selwyn Theatre to accommodate "intimate drama", as well as replacing the Selwyn Building with a structure containing rehearsal studios. The UDC opened a request for proposals for six of the theaters that October. The Liberty and Victory were to be converted into performing-arts venues for nonprofit organizations, while the Selwyn, Apollo, Lyric, and Times Square were to be converted to commercial use. By the end of the year, the plans were threatened by a lack of money.

In early 1989, several dozen nonprofit theater companies submitted plans to the UDC for the takeover of six theaters. Most of the bids were for the Liberty and Victory, but the Selwyn, Apollo, Lyric, and Times Square theaters received 13 bids between them. That year, The Durst Organization acquired the leases to eight theaters in Times Square, including the Selwyn. It subsequently announced plans to renovate the eight theaters in February 1990. The New York state government acquired the theater sites that April via eminent domain. The city had planned to buy out the theaters' leases but withdrew after the 42nd Street Company indicated it would lease the theaters to another developer. Although Durst protested the move, a New York Supreme Court judge ruled that the condemnation could occur. By then, the Selwyn was derelict; its marquee had the text "Enjoy a movie on 42d Street and bring the family."

A nonprofit organization, New 42nd Street, was formed in September 1990 to restore six of the theaters and find uses for them. Government officials hoped that development of the theaters would finally allow the construction of the four towers around 42nd Street, Broadway, and Seventh Avenue. In 1992, New 42nd Street received $18.2 million for restoring the six theaters as part of an agreement with Prudential and Park Tower. Artists Kristin Jones and Andrew Ginzel placed an art installation in the empty theater the next year. By 1994, the Warner Music Group considered leasing the Selwyn as a recording studio. After Disney committed to restoring the New Amsterdam Theatre in 1994, most of the other theaters around 42nd Street were quickly leased, but the Selwyn remained empty. The Times Square Business Improvement District opened a visitor center in the Selwyn's lobby in April 1996, and Jujamcyn again considered leasing the theater at that time. Though Jujamcyn was a for-profit operator, the New York City government had specified that the Selwyn operate as a nonprofit venue. There was still no long-term plan for the Selwyn, even as plans had been announced for all the other theaters on the block.

==== Roundabout lease and building collapse ====
The Roundabout Theatre Company had submitted a bid for one of the six theaters on 42nd Street, but its artistic director Todd Haimes initially rejected the area as being too rundown. Instead, Roundabout leased one Broadway and one off-Broadway space at the nearby Criterion Center, but it still had no permanent building. In October 1996, Haimes and 42nd Street Development Corporation executive Rebecca Robertson began discussing the possibility of Roundabout leasing a theater on 42nd Street. By January 1997, the company was negotiating for the Selwyn Theatre, just as New 42nd Street was planning a six-story headquarters on the adjacent site. Two months later, amid a rapid increase in the valuation of real estate along Times Square, the Criterion Center's owner notified Haimes that Roundabout's lease would be terminated in March 1999. The impending eviction prompted the company to intensify its search for a permanent home. Haimes wanted a theater that contained at least 500 seats, as well as fly space and wings.

The Wooster Group brought a limited production of Eugene O'Neill's The Hairy Ape to the Selwyn in April 1997 for an eight-week run. By that time, the buildings to the west were being demolished to make way for the E-Walk project, requiring motion detectors to be installed on the Selwyn Building. Roundabout committed to renovating the Selwyn in September 1997. At the time, Roundabout had raised about half of the $10–12 million required for the Selwyn's restoration. Roundabout did not receive any of New 42nd Street's $18.2 million grant, as the latter had already announced plans for its new building. The development of the New 42nd Street Building forced the closure of the Grand Luncheonette in the Selwyn's lobby in October 1997; the restaurant had operated in Times Square for 58 years.

In late December 1997, E-Walk contractors noticed cracks on the Selwyn Building's facade but failed to notify the New York City Department of Buildings (DOB) of any potential problems. The Selwyn Building collapsed during a heavy rainstorm on December 30, 1997. The collapse destroyed several pieces of memorabilia in the Times Square visitor center, including pinball machines and sex-store advertisements. The building had been vacant at the time, but police cordoned the area off because the collapse had occurred just before the Times Square Ball drop. The Times Square visitor center was subsequently relocated to the Embassy Theatre. In August 1998, the DOB found that the Big Apple Wrecking and Construction Corporation, a contractor for the E-Walk project, was liable for the Selwyn Building's collapse. Big Apple had failed to underpin the building's foundation when it was excavating the E-Walk site, which contributed to the collapse. The DOB could only penalize Big Apple by issuing fines of several thousand dollars.

==== Redesign and funding ====
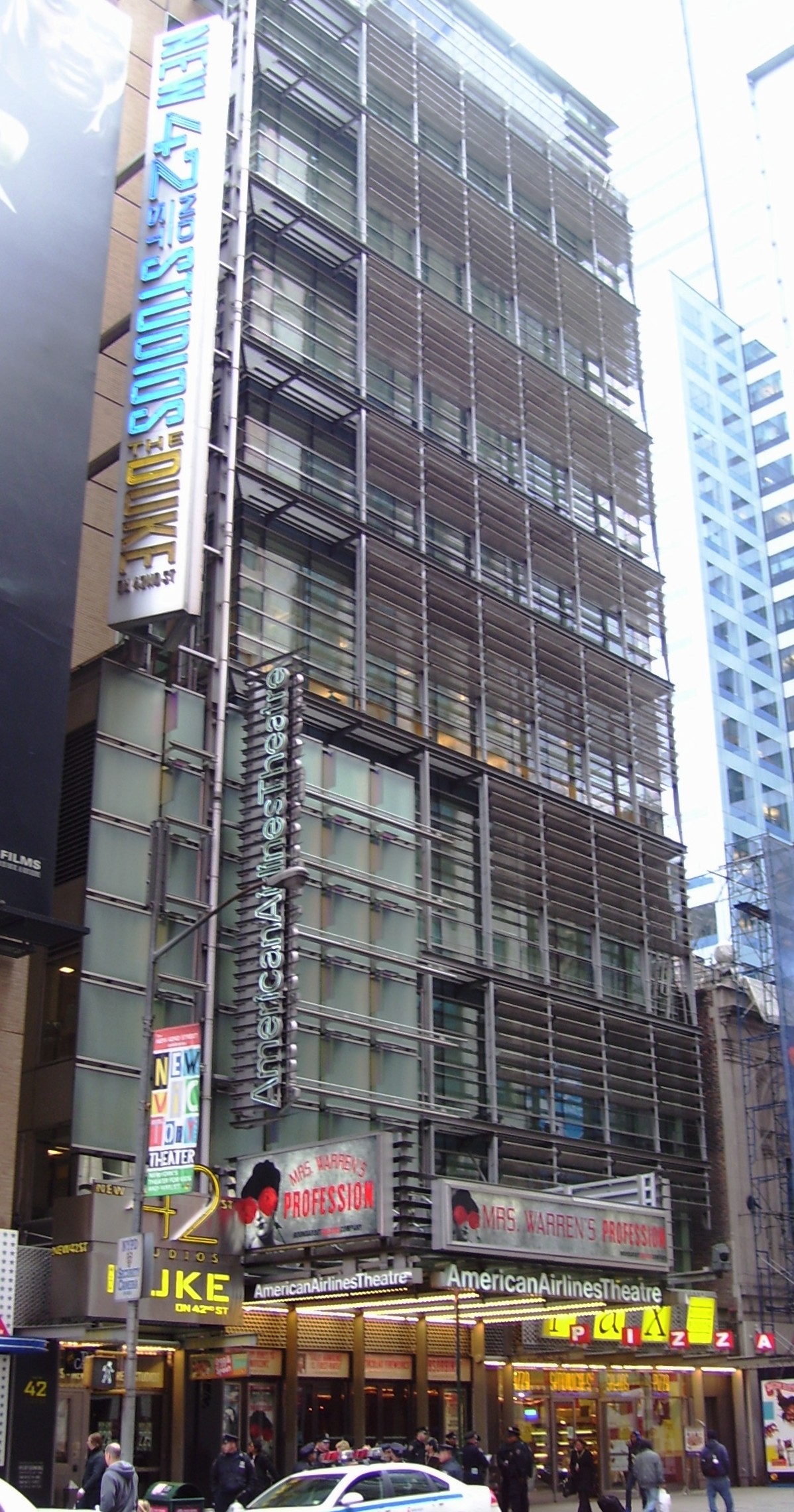
The Todd Haimes Theatre is accessed through the New 42nd Street Building.

The collapse of the Selwyn Building had forced New 42nd Street to redesign its proposed building. According to New 42nd Street president Cora Cahan, the original plans "had been more than 75 percent drawn". The New York State Council on the Arts, which had pledged funding for the Selwyn's restoration, instead allocated the money toward a new design for the New 42nd Street Building. In September 1998, the Doris Duke Foundation donated $3.5 million to New 42nd Street. The project also received $11.9 million from the developers of the 42nd Street Redevelopment's four large towers; $4 million from the city government; and $1 million from the LuEsther T. Mertz Charitable Trust. The next month, the organization announced that it had finalized plans for its building and would start construction immediately. The ten-story building was to cost $22.9 million and was planned to be completed by the end of the next year.

In February 1999, Roundabout announced that it would raise $17 million for the theater. At the time, $10 million had been raised. Roundabout hoped to raise the remaining funds by selling off "gift opportunities". Donors could pay $5,000 for a plaque affixed to one of the orchestra-level seats; $75,000 for a bathroom; $375,000 for the orchestra pit; and $10 million for naming rights to the entire theater. Roundabout was still negotiating with performers' unions over the operation of the rebuilt theater. Roundabout hired Robert Ascione and Karlsberger Architecture to redesign the theater. In addition, Francesca Russo was the restoration architect, while Tony Walton was the scenic designer. The Selwyn was reduced to 740 seats as part of the renovation.

After being evicted from the Criterion Center in March 1999, Roundabout had to rent temporary space for several months. In May 1999, the Tony Awards' administration committee ruled that the Selwyn counted as a Broadway theater, so productions there would be eligible for the Tonys. By that September, Roundabout had raised $15 million of a $21.5 million endowment for the theater. The Selwyn was renamed in March 2000 after American Airlines (AA), which would pay $850,000 annually over at least ten years. AA's name would be placed on the marquee as well as all advertisements and tickets. At the time, Broadway theaters were typically named for actors or theater operators rather than companies. The renaming was the most controversial part of the renovation. In total, the existing theater cost $25 million to renovate, while the new building cost $29.6 million.

=== Roundabout operation ===
==== 2000s ====
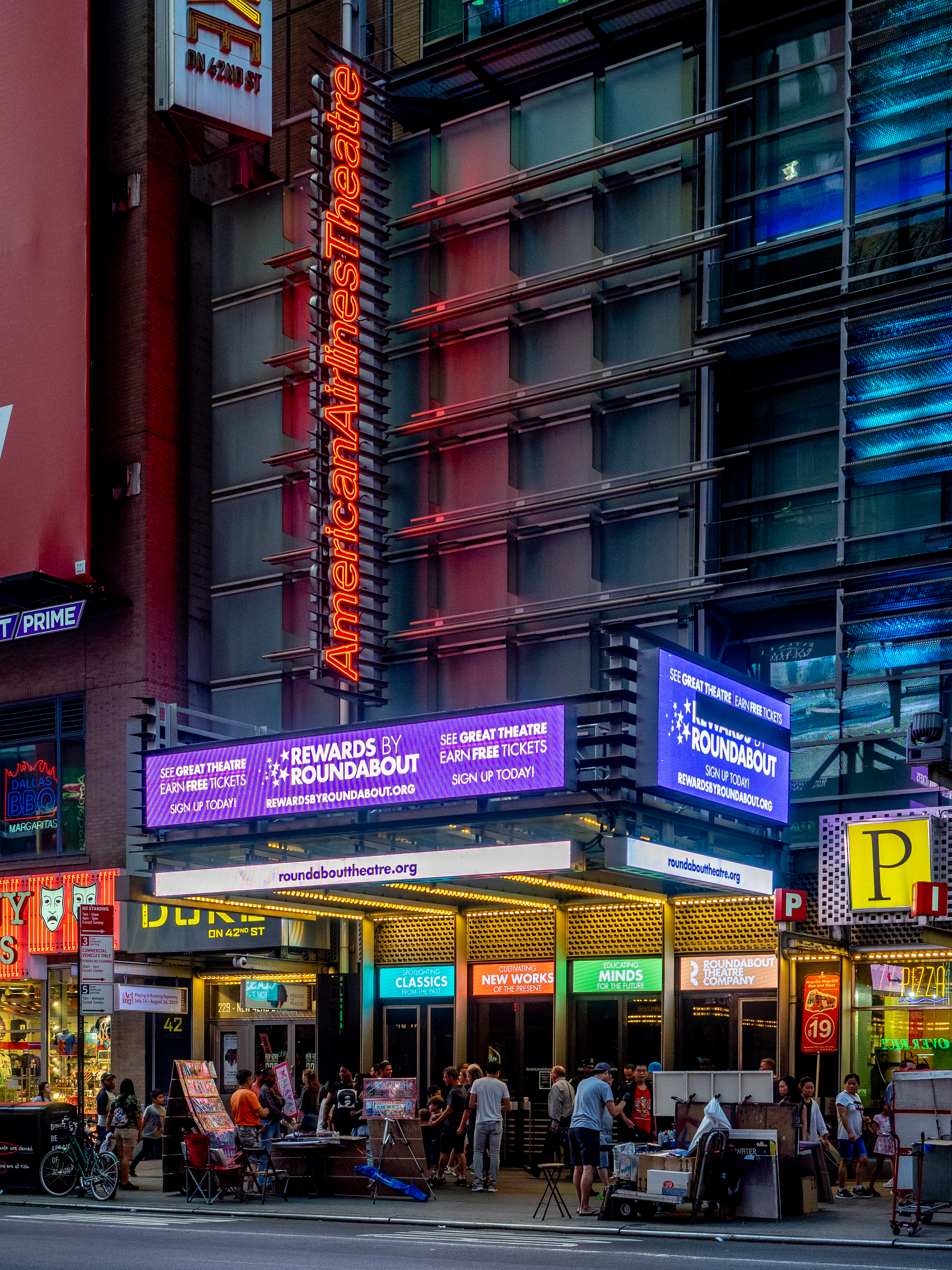
A view of the theater when it was known as the American Airlines Theatre

A revival of Uncle Vanya was originally scheduled as the renovated theater's first production, but Roundabout instead booked a revival of The Man Who Came to Dinner in late 1999. New 42nd Street opened the studios in its new building on June 20, 2000. The American Airlines Theatre informally reopened on June 30, 2000, even though the subscribers' lobby was incomplete at the time. At the time, Roundabout had 46,000 subscribers; this was nearly three times the 17,000 subscribers it had in 1983. The theater formally reopened on July 27, 2000. Typically, the American Airlines hosted two to five Broadway productions per season due to Roundabout's subscription format; most shows ran for fewer than 100 performances. In the first decade of the 21st century, the theater had the most new productions of any Broadway venue, since all productions had limited runs regardless of their success. Actors at the theater were originally paid a lower rate than those at for-profit Broadway theaters, but this was changed in 2002 following negotiations with the Actors' Equity Association.

The reopened theater featured the plays The Man Who Came to Dinner and Betrayal in 2000; Design for Living, Major Barbara, and The Women in 2001; and An Almost Holy Picture and The Man Who Had All the Luck in 2002. During mid-2002, on evenings when The Man Who Had All the Luck did not perform, Mario Cantone hosted a stand-up comedy show at the theater. Roundabout's first musical at the theater was The Boys from Syracuse at the beginning of the 2002–2003 season. The theater then hosted the plays Tartuffe and A Day in the Death of Joe Egg and the musical Big River in 2003. Additionally, Yakov Smirnoff performed the comedy show As Long As We Both Shall Laugh on nights when Joe Egg did not perform. Despite critical acclaim for these shows, Roundabout recorded a net loss during the 2002–2003 season, the company's first in two decades. The 2003–2004 season saw revivals of the plays The Caretaker, Twentieth Century, and After the Fall.

The American Airlines opened the 2004–2005 season with a revival of the play Twelve Angry Men, which was extended several times and became Roundabout's longest-running show at the theater. That season also saw a revival of the play The Constant Wife. The American Airlines next hosted the play A Naked Girl on the Appian Way and the musical The Pajama Game during the 2005–2006 season; although The Pajama Game was especially popular, it closed instead of transferring to another theater. The theater was then occupied by the plays Heartbreak House, Prelude to a Kiss, and Old Acquaintance during the 2006–2007 season, as well as Pygmalion, The 39 Steps, and Les Liaisons Dangereuses in the 2007–2008 season. 39 Steps, which transferred to other Broadway theaters after its run at the American Airlines, was Broadway's most successful play in several years, running through 2010. The American Airlines' 2008–2009 season saw more revivals of plays, namely A Man for All Seasons, Hedda Gabler, and The Philanthropist. Roundabout presented the plays After Miss Julie and Present Laughter and the musical Everyday Rapture in the 2009–2010 season.

==== 2010s ====
In 2010, Roundabout and AA agreed to renew their naming-rights contract. The theater hosted the plays Mrs. Warren's Profession and The Importance of Being Earnest in the 2010–2011 season, (Note: For a listing of which shows were performed in a given season, see: "Past Shows". Roundabout Theatre Company – Broadway, Off-Broadway Tickets & Shows.) with the latter production being extended due to its popularity. This was followed by the plays Man and Boy, The Road to Mecca, and Don't Dress for Dinner in 2011–2012; Cyrano de Bergerac, Picnic, and The Big Knife in 2012–2013; and The Winslow Boy and Machinal in 2013–2014. The musical Violet, whose limited run spanned 128 performances, was also performed during the 2013–2014 season. During the 2014–2015 season, the theater hosted the play The Real Thing and the musical On the Twentieth Century, the latter of which had 144 performances.

The American Airlines hosted a mixture of revivals and original plays in the late 2010s, including Old Times, Noises Off, and Long Day's Journey into Night in the 2015–2016 season and The Cherry Orchard, The Price, and Marvin's Room in the 2016–2017 season. Next, the theater hosted the play Time and the Conways, John Lithgow's solo Stories by Heart, and the play Travesties in 2017–2018. The theater staged Bernhardt/Hamlet, True West, and All My Sons for the 2018–2019 season. Only two plays were performed in the 2019–2020 season: The Rose Tattoo and A Soldier's Play. The American Airlines' regular season was cut short when the theater closed on March 12, 2020, due to the COVID-19 pandemic. It reopened with previews of the play Trouble in Mind on October 29, 2021.

==== 2020s to present ====
The 2021–2022 season had three shows: Trouble in Mind, the play Birthday Candles, and the musical 1776. These shows had originally been delayed to early 2021, but they were pushed further due to the extension of COVID-19 restrictions. A one-year-long renovation of the penthouse lobby was also announced in 2021. The play Fat Ham opened at the American Airlines during the 2022–2023 season. After Todd Haimes died in April 2023, Roundabout announced in June 2023 that the American Airlines would be renamed the Todd Haimes Theatre in the following year. The theater's new marquee was unveiled on January 31, 2024. During the 2023–2024 season, the theater hosted the play I Need That and the play Doubt. This was followed during the 2024–2025 season by the plays Home, Yellow Face, English, and a jazz-themed revival of The Pirates of Penzance titled Pirates! The Penzance Musical.

Following the 2024–2025 season, Roundabout planned to temporarily close the theater in late 2025 for an interior renovation. The project began in August 2025 and included restoring the interior, elevators, mechanical systems, and restrooms, as well as replacing the seats and making accessibility upgrades. The $24 million cost was partially funded by several New York state agencies: the New York State Council on the Arts, Empire State Development, and the Dormitory Authority of the State of New York. The theater reopened in March 2026, and the play Fallen Angels was then staged at the Todd Haimes that April.

== Notable productions ==
Productions are listed by the year of their first performance. This list only includes Broadway shows; it does not include films screened at the theater. No productions were hosted at the theater between 1950 and 2000.

=== Selwyn Theatre ===
Notable productions at the theater
| Opening year | Name | Refs. |
|---|---|---|
| 1918 | The Crowded Hour | |
| 1919 | Buddies | |
| 1920 | Tickle Me | |
| 1920 | The Emperor Jones | |
| 1921 | The Circle | |
| 1922 | The Blue Kitten | |
| 1922 | Partners Again | |
| 1923 | Battling Buttler | |
| 1924 | Charlot Revue (1924) | |
| 1924 | Kid Boots | |
| 1925 | The Gorilla | |
| 1925 | Charlot Revue (1925) | |
| 1926 | Castles in the Air | |
| 1926 | The Constant Nymph | |
| 1927 | The Royal Family | |
| 1928 | This Year of Grace | |
| 1929 | Wake Up and Dream | |
| 1930 | Three's a Crowd | |
| 1932 | Electra | |
| 1932 | The Great Magoo | |
| 1933 | Evensong | |
| 1933 | Walk a Little Faster | |
| 1949 | The Respectful Prostitute | |
| 1950 | Ladies' Night in a Turkish Bath | |

=== American Airlines Theatre and Todd Haimes Theatre ===
Notable productions at the theater
| Opening year | Name | Refs. |
|---|---|---|
| 2000 | The Man Who Came to Dinner | |
| 2000 | Betrayal | |
| 2001 | Design for Living | |
| 2001 | Major Barbara | |
| 2001 | The Women | |
| 2002 | An Almost Holy Picture | |
| 2002 | The Man Who Had All the Luck | |
| 2002 | An Evening with Mario Cantone | |
| 2002 | The Boys from Syracuse | |
| 2003 | Tartuffe | |
| 2003 | A Day in the Death of Joe Egg | |
| 2003 | As Long As We Both Shall Laugh | |
| 2003 | Big River | |
| 2003 | The Caretaker | |
| 2004 | Twentieth Century | |
| 2004 | After the Fall | |
| 2004 | Twelve Angry Men | |
| 2005 | The Constant Wife | |
| 2005 | A Naked Girl on the Appian Way | |
| 2006 | The Pajama Game | |
| 2006 | Heartbreak House | |
| 2007 | Prelude to a Kiss | |
| 2007 | Old Acquaintance | |
| 2007 | Pygmalion | |
| 2008 | The 39 Steps | |
| 2008 | Les Liaisons Dangereuses | |
| 2008 | A Man for All Seasons | |
| 2009 | Hedda Gabler | |
| 2009 | The Philanthropist | |
| 2009 | After Miss Julie | |
| 2010 | Present Laughter | |
| 2010 | Everyday Rapture | |
| 2010 | Mrs. Warren's Profession | |
| 2011 | The Importance of Being Earnest | |
| 2011 | Man and Boy | |
| 2012 | The Road to Mecca | |
| 2012 | Don't Dress for Dinner | |
| 2012 | Cyrano de Bergerac | |
| 2013 | Picnic | |
| 2013 | The Big Knife | |
| 2013 | The Winslow Boy | |
| 2014 | Machinal | |
| 2014 | Violet | |
| 2014 | The Real Thing | |
| 2015 | On the Twentieth Century | |
| 2015 | Old Times | |
| 2016 | Noises Off | |
| 2016 | Long Day's Journey into Night | |
| 2016 | The Cherry Orchard | |
| 2017 | The Price | |
| 2017 | Marvin's Room | |
| 2017 | Time and the Conways | |
| 2018 | John Lithgow: Stories by Heart | |
| 2018 | Travesties | |
| 2018 | Bernhardt/Hamlet | |
| 2019 | True West | |
| 2019 | All My Sons | |
| 2019 | The Rose Tattoo | |
| 2020 | A Soldier's Play | |
| 2021 | Trouble in Mind | |
| 2022 | Birthday Candles | |
| 2022 | 1776 | |
| 2023 | Fat Ham | |
| 2023 | I Need That | |
| 2024 | Doubt | |
| 2024 | Home | |
| 2024 | Yellow Face | |
| 2025 | English | |
| 2025 | Pirates! The Penzance Musical | |
| 2026 | Fallen Angels | |

== Box office record ==
I Need That achieved the box office record for the Todd Haimes Theatre. The production grossed $905,467 over eight performances for the week ending December 31, 2023, breaking the previous record of $638,811 set by True West on the week ending March 17, 2019.

== See also ==
- List of Broadway theaters
