= Harold B. Franklin =

American cinema chain executive and producer

- Born: 4 May 1889; New York City, New York, US
- Died: 21 April 1941 (aged 51); Mexico City, Mexico
- Occupations: Theatrical producer and manager

Harold B. Franklin (4 May 1889 – 21 April 1941) was an American cinema chain executive who later moved into production of stage shows and films. He co-produced the musical comedy Revenge with Music (1934). He produced the 1940 melodrama parody film The Villain Still Pursued Her.

== Life ==
Harold B. Franklin was born in New York City, New York, on 4 April 1889. He started his career as a vaudeville booking agent. In 1914 he became a theater manager.

=== Cinema executive ===
Franklin joined Adolph Zukor's Famous Players–Lasky and became vice-president of Publix Theatres. At the start of 1928 the Fox Film Corporation bought West Coast Theaters (Wesco), with over 232 houses. Franklin continued in charge of Wesco, based in Los Angeles. Dynamite, directed by Cecil B. DeMille, premiered on 25 July 1929 at the Carthay Circle Theatre in Los Angeles. The next day Franklin wrote to DeMille asking him to cut almost forty minutes from the 129-minute film so that when it went into general release the smaller houses could get more daily screenings. DeMille said he would try, but the longer version is the one that has survived. In 1930 Franklin lobbied against Daylight Saving, which he said cut 10% to 30% of gross theater sales. Industries involved in outdoor activities such as sports and barbecues were in favor of Daylight saving.

On 6 April 1930 Harley L. Clarke was elected president of Fox Films and Fox Theaters, replacing William Fox. Clarke wanted more control over the Fox West Coast Theater chain, which Franklin had been running without much interference. After six months he offered Franklin a contract buy-out, which he accepted. Franklin then became president of Hughes Franklin Theatres. In 1932 RKO had a management shake-up driven by David Sarnoff, chairman of the board and president of RKO's parent, RCA. Franklin became president of the theater division, Keith-Albee-Orpheum. Franklin reorganized the division and eliminated twenty-eight unprofitable theaters, but gross revenues declined due to lack of good pictures and a general downturn in cinema attendance. Franklin was transferred to become president of the RKO circuit.

=== Producer ===
In 1933 Franklin left RKO and joined up with Archibald Selwyn to form Frankwyn Productions, a stage production company. He also became president of Standard Theatres. Continental Varieties, a vaudeville review co-produced Selwyn and Franklin, opened at the Little Theatre on 3 October 1934 and ran for 77 performances. Yip Harburg wrote the lyrics. Franklin's independent production company filmed Gambling in August–September 1934 at the ESSI studio in Astoria, Queens, directed by Rowland V. Lee. The picture was adapted from a 1929 stage melodrama written by George M. Cohan, in which he also starred. Cohan was again the star of the film. The film was a failure, described as "a stodgy adaptation of a definitely dated play directed in obsolete theatrical technique.

Franklin briefly worked for Columbia in 1935. He managed the "Motion Pictures' Greatest Year" campaign in 1938. In 1940 Franklin's independent film company Franklin-Blank released The Villain Still Pursued Her, which was distributed by RKO. The script by Elbert Franklin was based on the play The Fallen Saved. The film is a parody of Victorian melodramas, described as "more silly than funny". Buster Keaton introduced some genuinely humorous moments. The film was a flop when it was released, but still has some fans.

Franklin died in Mexico City, Mexico, on 21 April 1941.

== Work ==
=== Theater productions ===
Franklin is credited as producer of the following stage pieces:CITEREFHarold_B._Franklin,_IBDB

- Lady Jane (Play, Comedy) Sep 10, 1934 - Oct 1934
- Continental Varieties (Musical, Revue,) Oct 03, 1934 - Nov 13, 1934
- Conversation Piece (Play, Romantic Comedy) Oct 23, 1934 - Dec 08, 1934
- L'Aiglon (Play, Drama, Tragedy, Revival) Nov 03, 1934 - Dec 1934
- Revenge with Music (Musical) Nov 28, 1934 - Apr 27, 1935

=== Films ===
Franklin is credited as producer in the following:

- Gambling (1934) directed by Rowland V. Lee, starring George M. Cohan, Wynne Gibson, Dorothy Burgess
- The Villain Still Pursued Her (1940) directed by Edward F. Cline, starring Billy Gilbert, Anita Louise, Margaret Hamilton

=== Books ===
Franklin wrote two books:

- 'Franklin, Harold B. (1927). Motion picture theatre management. Garden City, N.Y.: Doubleday, Doran. p. 365.
- 'Franklin, Harold B. (1929). Sound Motion Pictures, from the Laboratory to Their Presentation. Garden City, N.Y. p. 401.

== Sources ==
- Birchard, Robert S. (2009-12-01). Cecil B. DeMille's Hollywood. University Press of Kentucky. ISBN 978-0-8131-3829-9.
- Erickson, Hal (2014). "The Villain Still Pursued Her (1941)". Rotten Tomatoes.
- "Harold B Franklin". MPPDA Digital Archive. Flinders Institute for Research in the Humanities.
- "Harold B. Franklin". IMDb.
- "Harold B. Franklin". IBDB.
- Jewell, Richard B. (2012-03-02). RKO Radio Pictures: A Titan Is Born. University of California Press. ISBN 978-0-520-95195-2.
- Koszarski, Richard (2008-08-27). Hollywood On the Hudson: Film and Television in New York from Griffith to Sarnoff. Rutgers University Press. ISBN 978-0-8135-4552-3.
- Meade, Marion (1997). Buster Keaton: Cut to the Chase. Perseus Books Group. ISBN 978-0-306-80802-9.
- Meyerson, Harold; Harburg, Ernie (1995). Who Put the Rainbow in the Wizard of Oz?: Yip Harburg, Lyricist. University of Michigan Press. ISBN 0-472-08312-0.
- Solomon, Aubrey (2011-04-04). The Fox Film Corporation, 1915-1935: A History and Filmography. McFarland. ISBN 978-0-7864-8610-6.
- ""Unlimited Possibilities for Evil": Hollywood Resists Daylight Saving". History Matters.
