= William Cary Duncan =

American lyricist

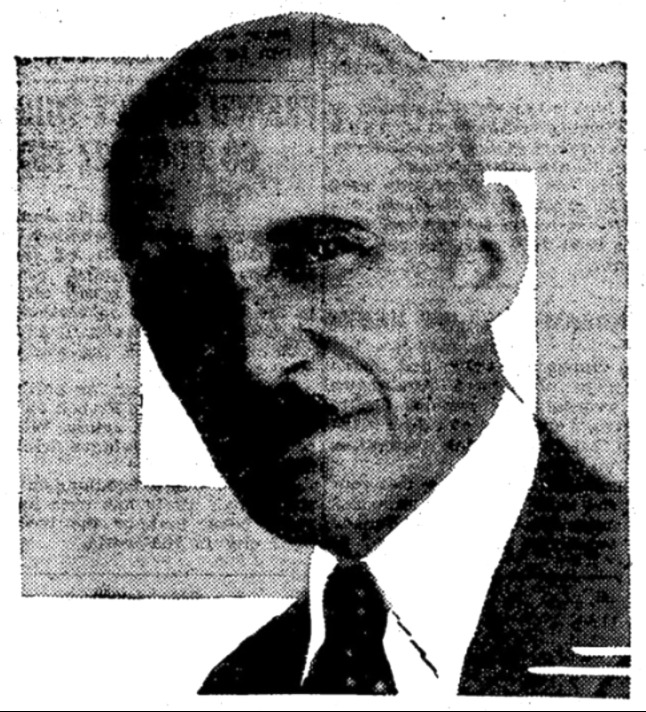
Carey in 1930 (from Variety)

William Cary Duncan, sometimes given as William Carey Duncan, (6 February 1874, North Brookfield, Massachusetts – 21 November 1945, North Brookfield, Massachusetts) was an American playwright, lyricist, editor, writer, and educator. He is best remembered for authoring the book and/or lyrics to many musicals; fifteen of which were staged on Broadway from 1913 through 1929. He also wrote a biography on Eliza Jumel, The Amazing Madame Jumel (published in 1935), and a book on the racehorse Goldsmith Maid; Golden Hoofs The Story of an Amazing Mare (published 1938).

== Life and career ==
William Cary Duncan was born in North Brookfield, Massachusetts on February 6, 1874. His half brother was James Eaton Tower; a longtime editor of Good Housekeeping. He was educated at Amherst College where he graduated in 1897. After graduating he joined the teaching staff of Brooklyn Polytechnic Preparatory School (now Poly Prep Country Day School) in the Fall of 1897. He taught English and public speaking at that school for the next 20 years.

Duncan began writing musicals in 1911.

In addition to writing and teaching, Duncan was a dog enthusiast who served terms as president of the Irish Setter Club of America and director of the American Kennel Club. He was a judge for the Westminster Kennel Club Dog Show at Madison Square Garden in 1929.

== Personal life and death ==
At the age of 71, William Cary Duncan died of heart disease on November 21, 1945, at his home in North Brookfield, Massachusetts. He was married to Louise Duncan (née Van Cleef) with whom he had one son, William Cary Duncan Jr.

== Partial list of stage works ==
- The Blue Kitten (1922)
- Mary Jane McKane (1923)
- Yes, Yes, Yvette (1926)
- Sunny Days (1928)
