= Secrets of a Secretary =

1931 film

- Poster
- Directed by: George Abbott
- Written by: George Abbott (adaptation)
- Story by: Charles Brackett
- Produced by: George Abbott
- Starring: Claudette Colbert; Herbert Marshall
- Cinematography: George J. Folsey
- Edited by: Helene Turner
- Music by: Johnny Green
- Distributed by: Paramount Pictures
- Release date: September 5, 1931
- Running time: 71 minutes
- Country: United States
- Language: English

Secrets of a Secretary is a 1931 American pre-Code drama film directed by George Abbott, and starring Claudette Colbert and Herbert Marshall. The film was stage actress Mary Boland's first role in a talkie. From a story by Charles Brackett.

== Plot ==
Society girl becomes a social secretary when her father dies penniless.

== Cast ==
- Claudette Colbert as Helen Blake
- Herbert Marshall as Lord Danforth
- Georges Metaxa as Frank D'Agnoll
- Betty Lawford as Sylvia Merritt
- Mary Boland as Mrs. Merritt
- Berton Churchill as Mr. Merritt
- Averell Harris as Don Marlow
- Betty Garde as Dorothy White
- Hugh O'Connell as Charlie Rickenbacker
- Joseph Crehan as Reporter (uncredited)
- Porter Hall as Drunk (uncredited)
- H. Dudley Hawley as Mr. Blake (uncredited)
- Olaf Hytten as Court Reporter (uncredited)
- Edward Keane as Albany Hotel Manager (uncredited)
- Barry Macollum (uncredited)
- Millard Mitchell as Policeman (uncredited)
- William Pawley (uncredited)
- Charles C. Wilson as Police Captain (uncredited)

== See also ==
- The House That Shadows Built (1931 promotional film by Paramount Pictures)
