= Wake Up and Dream (musical) =

- sheet music
- Music: Cole Porter
- Lyrics: Cole Porter
- Book: John Hastings Turner
- Productions: 1929 London; 1929 Broadway

Wake Up and Dream is a musical revue with a book by John Hastings Turner and music and lyrics by Cole Porter and others. The most famous song from the revue is the Porter standard "What Is This Thing Called Love?"

The revue opened in London while Porter's Paris was still running on Broadway. Producer Charles B. Cochran asked Porter to write the score, even though in their previous dealings Porter had treated him with some discourtesy. Opening on December 30, 1929, the production was the last to open on Broadway in the 1920s.

The title later would be used for unrelated films in 1934, 1942 and 1946.

== Synopsis ==
The show was a revue with 24 sets, 500 costumes, a large international cast, and "a thread of a book." The song "Let's Do It, Let's Fall in Love" (performed in London) had "sensual choreography," and was set in front of a large African idol, with a tom-tom beat with Tilly Losch dancing and Elsie Carlisle singing in torch singer style. The elaborate ballet for the song "Wake Up and Dream" uses folklore and history. "Coppélia" is danced as seen from the wings. According to critic Brooks Atkinson of The New York Times, "A 'Gothic' number, to music by Bach, brings the reverence of the cathedral into the theatre."

== Songs (Broadway) ==
Act I

- Wake Up and Dream
- More Incredible Happenings (music and lyrics by Ronald Jeans)
- I Loved Him (but He Didn't Love Me)
- Coppélia (music by Léo Delibes)
- Operatic Pills
- Why Wouldn't I Do? (music and lyrics by Desmond Carter and Ivor Novello)
- She's Such a Comfort to Me (lyrics by Douglas Furber and Donovan Parsons; music by Arthur Schwartz)
- The Banjo That Man Joe Plays
- Entrance of Emigrants
- Farruca
- Saragossa Jota

Act II

- What Is This Thing Called Love?
- Fancy Our Meeting (lyrics by Douglas Furber; music by Joseph Meyer and Philip Charig)
- Gothic (music by Johann Sebastian Bach)
- An Old English Folk Song (music and lyrics by Douglas Furber; Jack Buchanan and Charles Prentice)
- Romba
- (After All, I'm) Only a Schoolgirl
- Which Is the Right Life?
- I'm a Gigolo

Several songs in the London production, most notably "Let's Do It, Let's Fall in Love", were not included in the Broadway version.

== Productions ==
The piece originally was called Charles B. Cochran's 1929 Revue. Tryouts began on 5 March 1929 at the Palace Theatre in Manchester, England. It then opened on 27 March 1929 at the London Pavilion and ran for 263 performances. The production was directed by Frank Collins with choreography by Jack Buchanan, Tilly Losch, and Max Rivers, with a cast that featured Jessie Matthews, Sonnie Hale, Tillie Losch, Douglas Byng and Elsie Carlisle.

After the London production closed, a Broadway production opened at the Selwyn Theatre on 30 December 1929 and closed on 26 April 1930 after 136 performances. Produced by Arch Selwyn in association with Cochran, the London director and choreographers reprised their work, and the cast featured Buchanan (replacing Hale), Matthews and Losch.

== Critical reaction ==
The London show had mixed reviews from the critics but still had a run of 263 performances, but the 1929 stock market crash affected the Broadway box office.

Brooks Atkinson (The New York Times) wrote that when the revue was at its best "which is not all the time, it is entertainment of a very superior style--light, swift and beautiful... For half the length of the new revue ... the superb grace of the dancing ... the dainty, wry touch of comedy ... the meaningful splendor of the costumes, the lyrics, the frank make-believe of the scenery turn this revue into a hippodrome of civilized delights. But when the material is flimsy, as it is through most of the second half, the perfection of the talent is merely wasted."

The critic for The New Yorker wrote that it was "one of the dullest revues ever put on the local boards." However, columnist Walter Winchell praised the revue and Porter's songs, especially noting that "What is This Thing Called Love?" was one of the "newest breed of love songs."
