= List of performances by Felice Lascelles =

Felice Lascelles (née Felicia Madge Lessels; 19 July 1904 – 29 April 1961) was a musical comedy actress, singer and dancer who performed on stage in the UK and Ireland from the early 1920s to 1940.

== Introduction ==
The following table is an incomplete list of shows performed by Felice Lascelles; it provides the following information:

- Title – the title of the show
- Role – the role performed, or (Unknown)
- Theatre – the venue where the show was performed
- Location – the venue's location
- Opening date – the date of the show's first performance
- Closing date – the date of the show's last performance
- # of perf. – the number of performances
- Ref. – one or more reference(s) for the performance (this column is not sortable).

== Musical theatre ==
Title	Role	Theatre	Location	Opening date	Closing date	# of perf.	Ref.
The Cabaret Girl	(Chorus girl)	Grand Theatre	Blackpool	25 Dec 1922	6 Jan 1923	13	
The Cabaret Girl	(Chorus girl)	Empire Theatre	Hartlepool	8 Jan 1923	13 Jan 1923	6	
The Cabaret Girl	(Chorus girl)	Grand Opera House	Middlesbrough	15 Jan 1923	20 Jan 1923	7	
The Cabaret Girl	(Chorus girl)	Empire Theatre	Preston	22 Jan 1923	27 Jan 1923	7	
The Cabaret Girl	(Chorus girl)	Theatre Royal	Bolton	29 Jan 1923	3 Feb 1923	7? (Note: The source(s) provide(s) only the opening date, venue and location, not the opening times or number of performances.)	
The Cabaret Girl	(Chorus girl)	Grand Theatre	Wolverhampton	5 Feb 1923	10 Feb 1923	7?	
The Cabaret Girl	(Chorus girl)	Royal Court Theatre	Liverpool	12 Feb 1923	17 Feb 1923	7	
The Cabaret Girl	(Chorus girl)	Grand Theatre	Hull	19 Feb 1923	24 Feb 1923	7	
The Cabaret Girl	(Chorus girl)	Prince's Theatre	Bristol	26 Feb 1923	3 Mar 1923	7	
The Cabaret Girl	(Chorus girl)	New Theatre	Cardiff	5 Mar 1923	10 Mar 1923	7	
The Cabaret Girl	(Chorus girl)	Theatre Royal	Portsmouth	12 Mar 1923	17 Mar 1923	7	.
The Cabaret Girl	(Chorus girl)	Theatre Royal	Brighton	19 Mar 1923	24 Mar 1923	7	
The Cabaret Girl	(Chorus girl)	Prince of Wales Theatre	Birmingham	26 Mar 1923	31 Mar 1923	7	
The Cabaret Girl	(Chorus girl)	Prince's Theatre	Manchester	2 Apr 1923	7 Apr 1923	8	
The Cabaret Girl	(Chorus girl)	Theatre Royal	Newcastle	9 Apr 1923	14 Apr 1923	7	
The Cabaret Girl	(Chorus girl)	Lyceum Theatre	Sheffield	16 Apr 1923	21 Apr 1923	7	
The Cabaret Girl	(Chorus girl)	Grand Theatre	Blackpool	9 Aug 1923	11 Aug 1923	6	
The Cabaret Girl	(Chorus girl)	Royal Court Theatre	Liverpool	13 Aug 1923	18 Aug 1923	7	
The Cabaret Girl	(Chorus girl)	Royal Lyceum Theatre	Edinburgh	20 Aug 1923	25 Aug 1923	7	
The Cabaret Girl	(Chorus girl)	King's Theatre	Glasgow	27 Aug 1923	1 Sep 1923	7	
The Cabaret Girl	(Chorus girl)	Grand Opera House	Harrogate	3 Sep 1923	8 Sep 1923	7?	
The Cabaret Girl	(Chorus girl)	Empire Theatre	Sunderland	10 Sep 1923	15 Sep 1923	7	
The Cabaret Girl	(Chorus girl)	Grand Theatre	Blackpool	17 Sep 1923	22 Sep 1923	6	
The Cabaret Girl	(Chorus girl)	Theatre Royal	Newcastle	24 Sep 1923	29 Sep 1923	7	
The Cabaret Girl	(Chorus girl)	Empire Theatre	Hartlepool	1 Oct 1923	6 Oct 1923	6	
The Cabaret Girl	(Chorus girl)	Grand Theatre	Hull	8 Oct 1923	13 Oct 1923	7	
The Cabaret Girl	(Chorus girl)	Prince's Theatre	Bradford	15 Oct 1923	20 Oct 1923	7	
The Cabaret Girl	(Chorus girl)	Theatre Royal	Leeds	22 Oct 1923	27 Oct 1923	7	
The Cabaret Girl	(Chorus girl)	Grand Opera House	Middlesbrough	29 Oct 1923	3 Nov 1923	7	
The Cabaret Girl	(Chorus girl)	Theatre Royal	Birmingham	5 Nov 1923	10 Nov 1923	7	
The Cabaret Girl	(Chorus girl)	Prince's Theatre	Manchester	12 Nov 1923	17 Nov 1923	7	
The Cabaret Girl	(Chorus girl)	Theatre Royal	Nottingham	19 Nov 1923	24 Nov 1923	7	
The Cabaret Girl	(Chorus girl)	Prince's Theatre	Bristol	26 Nov 1923	1 Dec 1923	7	
The Cabaret Girl	(Chorus girl)	King's Theatre	Hammersmith	3 Dec 1923	8 Dec 1923	7?	
The Cabaret Girl	(Chorus girl)	New Theatre	Wimbledon	10 Dec 1923	15 Dec 1923	7?	
The Beauty Prize	Shinny Fane	Royal Lyceum Theatre	Edinburgh	24 Dec 1923	19 Jan 1924	32	
The Beauty Prize	Shinny Fane	King's Theatre	Glasgow	21 Jan 1924	2 Feb 1924	14	
The Beauty Prize	Shinny Fane	Royal Court Theatre	Liverpool	4 Feb 1924	16 Feb 1924	14	
The Beauty Prize	Shinny Fane	Theatre Royal	Newcastle	18 Feb 1924	1 Mar 1924	14	
The Beauty Prize	Shinny Fane	Prince's Theatre	Bristol	3 Mar 1924	8 Mar 1924	7	
The Beauty Prize	Shinny Fane	Lyceum Theatre	Sheffield	10 Mar 1924	15 Mar 1924	7	
The Beauty Prize	Shinny Fane	Theatre Royal	Birmingham	17 Mar 1924	22 Mar 1924	8	
The Beauty Prize	Shinny Fane	Grand Theatre	Leeds	24 Mar 1924	29 Mar 1924	7	
The Beauty Prize	Shinny Fane	Grand Theatre	Hull	31 Mar 1924	5 Apr 1924	7	
The Beauty Prize	Shinny Fane	Theatre Royal	Nottingham	7 Apr 1924	12 Apr 1924	6	
The Beauty Prize	Shinny Fane	Prince's Theatre	Manchester	21 Apr 1924	3 May 1924	14	
Toni	(Chorus girl)	Theatre Royal	Hanley	6 Aug 1923	11 Aug 1923	7	
Toni	(Chorus girl)	(National tour)	(34 venues)	13 Aug 1923	10 May 1924	34 wks	
Toni	(Chorus girl)	Shaftesbury Theatre	London	12 May 1924	13 Dec 1924	248	
Boodle	Phyllis	Prince of Wales Theatre	Birmingham	26 Dec 1924	24 Jan 1925	24	
Boodle	Phyllis	Royal Court Theatre	Liverpool	26 Jan 1925	31 Jan 1925	8	
Boodle	Phyllis	King's Theatre	Glasgow	2 Feb 1925	14 Feb 1925	14	
Boodle	Phyllis	Royal Lyceum Theatre	Edinburgh	16 Feb 1925	21 Feb 1925	8	
Boodle	Phyllis	Grand Theatre	Hull	23 Feb 1925	28 Feb 1925	8	
Boodle	Phyllis	Prince's Theatre	Manchester	2 Mar 1925	7 Mar 1925	7	
Boodle	Phyllis	Empire	London	10 Mar 1925	30 May 1925	94	
On With the Dance	(Understudy)	Pavilion	London	30 Apr 1925	14 Nov 1925	229	
Still Dancing	One of the Ladies	Pavilion	London	19 Nov 1925	27 Feb 1926	114	
Kid Boots (West End)	(Chorus girl)	Winter Garden	London	2 Feb 1926	3 May 1926	160	
Kid Boots (West End)	(Chorus girl)	Winter Garden	London	18 May 1926	10 Jul 1926	160	
Kid Boots (National tour)	Polly	Prince of Wales Theatre	Birmingham	16 Aug 1926	21 Aug 1926	7	
Kid Boots (National tour)	Polly	Palace Theatre	Manchester	23 Aug 1926	11 Sep 1926	21	
Kid Boots (National tour)	Polly	Empire Theatre	Liverpool	13 Sep 1926	25 Sep 1926	14	
Kid Boots (National tour)	Beth	King's Theatre	Glasgow	27 Sep 1926	9 Oct 1926	13	
Kid Boots (National tour)	Beth	Alhambra Theatre	Bradford	11 Oct 1926	16 Oct 1926	?	
Kid Boots (National tour)	Beth	Winter Gardens	Blackpool	18 Oct 1926	23 Oct 1926	7	
Kid Boots (National tour)	Beth	King's Theatre	Southsea	25 Oct 1926	30 Oct 1926	7	
Kid Boots (National tour)	Beth	New Theatre	Cardiff	1 Nov 1926	6 Nov 1926	8	
Kid Boots (National tour)	Beth	Hippodrome	Golders Green	8 Nov 1926	13 Nov 1926	6	
Kid Boots (National tour)	Beth	Theatre Royal	Leeds	15 Nov 1926	27 Nov 1926	14	
Kid Boots (National tour)	Beth	King's Theatre	Edinburgh	29 Nov 1926	11 Dec 1926	14	
Kid Boots (National tour)	Beth	Theatre Royal	Nottingham	13 Dec 1926	18 Dec 1926	7	
Kid Boots (National tour)	Beth	Empire Theatre	Newcastle	27 Dec 1926	22 Jan 1927	25	
Kid Boots (National tour)	Beth	Hippodrome	Golders Green	24 Jan 1927	29 Jan 1927	7	
Sunny	Sunny Peters	Hippodrome Theatre	Margate	4 Jul 1927	9 Jul 1927	8	
Sunny	Sunny Peters	Pleasure Gardens	Folkestone	11 Jul 1927	16 Jul 1927	8	
Sunny	Sunny Peters	Gaiety Theatre	Hastings	18 Jul 1927	23 Jul 1927	8	
Sunny	Sunny Peters	Devonshire Park Theatre	Eastbourne	25 Jul 1927	30 Jul 1927	8	
Sunny	Sunny Peters	Theatre Royal	Chatham	1 Aug 1927	6 Aug 1927	8	
Sunny	Sunny Peters	Grand Theatre	Southampton	8 Aug 1927	13 Aug 1927	8	
Sunny	Sunny Peters	Theatre Royal	Bournemouth	15 Aug 1927	20 Aug 1927	?	
Sunny	Sunny Peters	Theatre Royal	Plymouth	22 Aug 1927	3 Sep 1927	16	
Sunny	Sunny Peters	Royal Theatre	Torquay	5 Sep 1927	10 Sep 1927	8	
Sunny	Sunny Peters	Grand Theatre	Swansea	12 Sep 1927	17 Sep 1927	?	
Sunny	Sunny Peters	Lyceum	Newport	19 Sep 1927	24 Sep 1927	8	
Sunny	Sunny Peters	Grand Theatre	Hanley	26 Sep 1927	8 Oct 1927	14	
Sunny	Sunny Peters	Grand Theatre	Wolverhampton	10 Oct 1927	15 Oct 1927	8	
Sunny	Sunny Peters	New Theatre	Oxford	17 Oct 1927	22 Oct 1927	8	
Sunny	Sunny Peters	Grand Theatre	Derby	24 Oct 1927	29 Oct 1927	8	
Sunny	Sunny Peters	Royal Opera House	Leicester	31 Oct 1927	5 Nov 1927	8	
Sunny	Sunny Peters	Opera House	Cork	7 Nov 1927	19 Nov 1927	14	
Sunny	Sunny Peters	Gaiety Theatre	Dublin	21 Nov 1927	3 Dec 1927	14	
Sunny	Sunny Peters	Grand Opera House	Belfast	5 Dec 1927	17 Dec 1927	14	
Sunny	Sunny Peters	His Majesty's Theatre	Aberdeen	19 Dec 1927	24 Dec 1927	8	
Sunny	Sunny Peters	(Absent due to illness) (Note: Lascelles became unwell during the 26 December 1927 performance at the King's Theatre in Dundee and her understudy, a 17-year old chorus girl named Miss Boulson, stood in for part of the show and again full time the next day, when Lascelles was rushed to the Dundee Infirmary to undergo emergency surgery for appendicitis.(Dundee Evening Telegraph; 28 Dec 1927) On Saturday 7 January 1928, Pearl Greene took over the lead role of Sunny from Boulson for the last day of the Dundee run,(Dundee Evening Telegraph; 6 Jan 1928) and for the following eight weeks, at: the Empire in South Shields (9 January);(The Stage; 12 Jan 1928, p. 15; col.4) the Empire in West Hartlepool (16 January);(The Stage; 12 Jan 1928, p. 1; col.4) the Opera House in Middlesbrough (23 January);(Newcastle Daily Chronicle; 24 Jan 1928) the Hippodrome in Darlington (30 January);(The Stage; 2 Feb 1928) the Theatre Royal in York (6 February);(Yorkshire Post; 8 Feb 1928) the Grand Theatre in Hull (13 February)(Hull Daily Mail; 14 Feb 1928) and the Hippodrome in Huddersfield (20 February),(Halifax Evening Courier; 21 Feb 1928) after which Lascelles returned to the role on 27 February 1928, at the Theatre Royal in Halifax.(Halifax Evening Courier; 28 Feb 1928))	–	26 Dec 1927	25 Feb 1928	(N/A)	
Sunny	Sunny Peters	Theatre Royal	Halifax	27 Feb 1928	3 Mar 1928	8	
Sunny	Sunny Peters	Theatre Royal	Blackburn	5 Mar 1928	10 Mar 1928	8	
Sunny	Sunny Peters	Empire Theatre	Preston	12 Mar 1928	17 Mar 1928	?	
Sunny	Sunny Peters	Grand Theatre	Oldham	19 Mar 1928	24 Mar 1928	?	
Sunny	Sunny Peters	Grand Opera House	Middlesbrough	2 Apr 1928	07 Apr 1928	7	
Sunny	Sunny Peters	Grand Theatre	Derby	9 Apr 1928	14 Apr 1928	8	
Sunny	Sunny Peters	Royal Opera House	Leicester	16 Apr 1928	21 Apr 1928	8	
Sunny	Sunny Peters	New Theatre	Cambridge	23 Apr 1928	28 Apr 1928	7	
Sunny	Sunny Peters	Theatre Royal	Norwich	30 Apr 1928	5 May 1928	?	
Sunny	Sunny Peters	New Theatre	Northampton	7 May 1928	12 May 1928	8	.
Sunny	Sunny Peters	Opera House	Tunbridge Wells	14 May 1928	19 May 1928	8	
Sunny	Sunny Peters	Devonshire Park Theatre	Eastbourne	21 May 1928	26 May 1928	8	
Sunny	Sunny Peters	Pleasure Gardens Theatre	Folkestone	28 May 1928	2 Jun 1928	8	
Sunny	Sunny Peters	Gaiety Theatre	Douglas	16 Jul 1928	21 Jul 1928	?	
Sunny	Sunny Peters	Grand Theatre	Llandudno	23 Jul 1928	28 Jul 1928	?	
Sunny	Sunny Peters	Pavilion Theatre	Rhyl	30 Jul 1928	4 Aug 1928	8	
Sunny	Sunny Peters	Opera House	Harrogate	6 Aug 1928	11 Aug 1928	?	
Sunny	Sunny Peters	Theatre Royal	York	13 Aug 1928	18 Aug 1928	?	
Sunny	Sunny Peters	Winter Gardens Theatre	New Brighton	20 Aug 1928	25 Aug 1928	7	
Sunny	Sunny Peters	Tower Pavilion	Morecambe	27 Aug 1928	1 Sep 1928	8	
Sunny	Sunny Peters	Palace Theatre	Hull	3 Sep 1928	8 Sep 1928	7	
Sunny	Sunny Peters	Opera House	Scarborough	10 Sep 1928	15 Sep 1928	?	
Sunny	Sunny Peters	Palace Theatre	Burnley	17 Sep 1928	22 Sep 1928	8	
Sunny	Sunny Peters	Theatre Royal	Huddersfield	24 Sep 1928	29 Sep 1928	7	
Sunny	Sunny Peters	Grand Theatre	Hanley	1 Oct 1928	6 Oct 1928	7	
Sunny	Sunny Peters	Grand Theatre	Wolverhampton	8 Oct 1928	13 Oct 1928	8	.
Sunny	Sunny Peters	Theatre and Opera House	Cheltenham	15 Oct 1928	20 Oct 1928	8	
Sunny	Sunny Peters	Theatre Royal	Portsmouth	22 Oct 1928	27 Oct 1928	7	
Sunny	Sunny Peters	Theatre Royal	Bournemouth	29 Oct 1928	3 Nov 1928	?	
Sunny	Sunny Peters	Theatre Royal	Exeter	5 Nov 1928	10 Nov 1928	8	
Sunny	Sunny Peters	Theatre Royal	Plymouth	12 Nov 1928	17 Nov 1928	7	
Sunny	Sunny Peters	Lyceum Theatre	Newport	19 Nov 1928	24 Nov 1928	7	
Sunny	Sunny Peters	Grand Theatre	Swansea	26 Nov 1928	1 Dec 1928	7	
Sunny	Sunny Peters	The Hippodrome	Gloucester	3 Dec 1928	8 Dec 1928	8	
Sunny	Sunny Peters	Theatre Royal	Chatham	10 Dec 1928	15 Dec 1928	8	
Sunny	Sunny Peters	Theatre Royal	Dewsbury	26 Dec 1928	12 Jan 1929	22	
Sunny	Sunny Peters	Theatre Royal	Rochdale	14 Jan 1929	19 Jan 1929	?	
Sunny	Sunny Peters	Theatre Royal	Bury	21 Jan 1929	26 Jan 1929	6	
Sunny	Sunny Peters	Palace Theatre	Hull	28 Jan 1929	2 Feb 1929	7	
Sunny	Sunny Peters	Empire Theatre	Hartlepool	4 Feb 1929	9 Feb 1929	7	
Sunny	Sunny Peters	His Majesty's Theatre	Aberdeen	11 Feb 1929	16 Feb 1929	7	
Sunny	Sunny Peters	Hippodrome	Darlington	18 Feb 1929	23 Feb 1929	?	
Sunny	Sunny Peters	Theatre Royal	Halifax	25 Feb 1929	2 Mar 1929	7	
Sunny	Sunny Peters	Opera House	Blackpool	4 Mar 1929	9 Mar 1929	7	
Sunny	Sunny Peters	Empire Theatre	Preston	11 Mar 1929	16 Mar 1929	?	
Sunny	Sunny Peters	Theatre Royal	Blackburn	18 Mar 1929	23 Mar 1929	7	
Sunny	Sunny Peters	Theatre Royal	Nottingham	25 Mar 1929	30 Mar 1929	6	
Sunny	Sunny Peters	Empire Theatre	Sheffield	1 Apr 1929	6 Apr 1929	7	
Sunny	Sunny Peters	Empire	Chiswick	3 Feb 1930	8 Feb 1930	12	
Sunny	Sunny Peters	Empire	New Cross	10 Feb 1930	15 Feb 1930	12	
Sunny	Sunny Peters	Empire	Finsbury Park	17 Feb 1930	22 Feb 1930	12 (Note: On 20 February 1930, The Stage reported: 'In addition to the production of Rio Rita, Mr. Lee Ephraim has also six companies on tour. (...) and Sunny, with Mr. Eric Fawcett as Jim Demming and Miss Felice Lascelles in the title-role, are all playing at twice-nightly theatres round London, and are booked up to the end of June.'(The Stage; 20 Feb 1930))	
Sunny	Sunny Peters	Empire	Stratford	24 Feb 1930	1 Mar 1930	12	
Sunny	Sunny Peters	Chelsea Palace Theatre	Chelsea	3 Mar 1930	8 Mar 1930	12	
Sunny	Sunny Peters	Empress Theatre	Brixton	10 Mar 1930	15 Mar 1930	12	
Sunny	Sunny Peters	Palace Theatre	Walthamstow	17 Mar 1930	22 Mar 1930	12	
Sunny	Sunny Peters	Empire Theatre	Kilburn	24 Mar 1930	29 Mar 1930	12	
Sunny	Sunny Peters	Empire Theatre	Hackney	31 Mar 1930	5 Apr 1930	12	
Sunny	Sunny Peters	Empire Theatre	Holborn	7 Apr 1930	12 Apr 1930	12	
Sunny	Sunny Peters	Hippodrome	Willesden	14 Apr 1930	19 Apr 1930	12	
Sunny	Sunny Peters	Empire	Finsbury Park	21 Apr 1930	26 Apr 1930	12	
Sunny	Sunny Peters	Palace Theatre	Leicester	28 Apr 1930	3 May 1930	12	
Sunny	Sunny Peters	Hippodrome	Manchester	5 May 1930	10 May 1930	14	
Sunny	Sunny Peters	Palace Theatre	Hammersmith	12 May 1930	17 May 1930	12	
Sunny	Sunny Peters	Empire Theatre	Kingston	19 May 1930	24 May 1930	12	
Sunny	Sunny Peters	Hippodrome	Ilford	26 May 1930	31 May 1930	12	
Sunny	Sunny Peters	Empire Theatre	Newcastle	24 Dec 1932	31 Dec 1932	15	
Sunny	Sunny Peters	Empire Theatre	Newcastle	16 Jan 1933	18 Jan 1933	6	
Goldilocks and the Three Bears	Goldilocks	Theatre Royal	Birmingham	21 Dec 1929	1 Feb 1930	8 wks	
Darling, I Love You	Peggy Sylvester	Theatre Royal	Huddersfield	19 Jan 1931	24 Jan 1931	7	
Darling, I Love You	Peggy Sylvester	Royal Court Theatre	Liverpool	26 Jan 1931	31 Jan 1931	7	
Darling, I Love You	Peggy Sylvester	Hippodrome	Darlington	2 Feb 1931	7 Feb 1931	?	
Darling, I Love You	Peggy Sylvester	Hippodrome	Bristol	9 Feb 1931	14 Feb 1931	12	
Darling, I Love You	Peggy Sylvester	Grand Theatre	Derby	16 Feb 1931	21 Feb 1931	12	
Darling, I Love You	Peggy Sylvester	Hippodrome	Manchester	23 Feb 1931	28 Feb 1931	12	
Darling, I Love You	Peggy Sylvester	Hippodrome	Sheffield	2 Mar 1931	7 Mar 1931	12	
Darling, I Love You	Peggy Sylvester	Empire	Hackney	9 Mar 1931	14 Mar 1931	?	
Darling, I Love You	Peggy Sylvester	Grand Theatre	Swansea	16 Mar 1931	21 Mar 1931	?	
Darling, I Love You	Peggy Sylvester	Grand Theatre	Wolverhampton	23 Mar 1931	28 Mar 1931	12	
Darling, I Love You	Peggy Sylvester	Grand Theatre	Leeds	6 Apr 1931	11 Apr 1931	7	
Darling, I Love You	Peggy Sylvester	Theatre Royal	Hanley	13 Apr 1931	18 Apr 1931	7	
Darling, I Love You	Peggy Sylvester	Empire Theatre	Chiswick	20 Apr 1931	25 Apr 1931	12	
Darling, I Love You	Peggy Sylvester	Empire Theatre	Finsbury Park	27 Jul 1931	1 Aug 1931	12	
Darling, I Love You	Peggy Sylvester	Empire Theatre	Kingston	3 Aug 1931	8 Aug 1931	12	
Darling, I Love You	Peggy Sylvester	Pavilion Theatre	Rhyl	10 Aug 1931	12 Aug 1931	3	
Darling, I Love You	Peggy Sylvester	Pier Pavilion	Colwyn Bay	13 Aug 1931	15 Aug 1931	3	
Darling, I Love You	Peggy Sylvester	Empire Theatre	South Shields	17 Aug 1931	22 Aug 1931	12	
Darling, I Love You	Peggy Sylvester	Empire Theatre	Nottingham	24 Aug 1931	29 Aug 1931	12	
Darling, I Love You	Peggy Sylvester	Winter Gardens Theatre	New Brighton	31 Aug 1931	5 Sep 1931	7	
Darling, I Love You	Peggy Sylvester	Tower Theatre	Morecambe	14 Sep 1931	19 Sep 1931	7	
Darling, I Love You	Peggy Sylvester	Palace Theatre	Hull	21 Sep 1931	26 Sep 1931	12	
Darling, I Love You	Peggy Sylvester	Palace Theatre	Halifax	28 Sep 1931	3 Oct 1931	12	
Darling, I Love You	Peggy Sylvester	Palace Theatre	Blackburn	5 Oct 1931	10 Oct 1931	?	
Darling, I Love You	Peggy Sylvester	Hippodrome	Boscombe	12 Oct 1931	17 Oct 1931	12	
Darling, I Love You	Peggy Sylvester	Palace Theatre	Reading	2 Nov 1931	7 Nov 1931	12	
Darling, I Love You	Peggy Sylvester	Palace Theatre	Chelsea	9 Nov 1931	14 Nov 1931	12	
Darling, I Love You	Peggy Sylvester	Palace Theatre	East Ham	16 Nov 1931	21 Nov 1931	12	
Goody Two-Shoes	Goody	Theatre Royal	Exeter	26 Dec 1931	13 Feb 1932	69	
Stand Up and Sing	Ena	Grand Theatre	Wolverhampton	31 Oct 1932	5 Nov 1932	?	
Stand Up and Sing	Ena	Grand Opera House	Belfast	14 Nov 1932	18 Nov 1932	7	
Stand Up and Sing	Ena	Gaiety Theatre	Dublin	21 Nov 1932	26 Nov 1932	7	
Stand Up and Sing	Ena	Empire Theatre	Sheffield	28 Nov 1932	3 Dec 1932	12	
Stand Up and Sing	Ena	Empire Theatre	Leeds	5 Dec 1932	10 Dec 1932	12	
Stand Up and Sing	Mary	Empire Theatre	Newcastle	9 Jan 1933	14 Jan 1933	15	
That's a Good Girl	Moya Malone	Empire Theatre	Newcastle	2 Jan 1933	7 Jan 1933	15	
That's a Good Girl	Moya Malone	Empire Theatre	Newcastle	19 Jan 1933	21 Jan 1933	6	
Follow the Girl	Girl	Palace Theatre	Halifax	30 Oct 1933	4 Nov 1933	12	
Follow the Girl	Girl	Opera House	Blackpool	20 Nov 1933	25 Nov 1933	12	
Follow the Girl	Girl	Theatre Royal	Brighton	27 Nov 1933	2 Dec 1933	12	
Bubbles (Concert party)	Soubrette and dancer	Princess Pier	Torquay	17 Jun 1935	22 Jun 1935	?	
Bubbles (Concert party)	Soubrette and dancer	Victoria Pavilion	Ilfracombe	1 Jul 1935	21 Sep 1935	12 wks	
Gaiety Whirl of 1936	Herself	Gaiety Theatre	Ayr	8 Jun 1936	3 Oct 1936	204	
Venus in Silk	Mizzy	King's Theatre	Southsea	31 Jan 1938	5 Feb 1938	8	
Venus in Silk	Mizzy	Prince of Wales	Cardiff	7 Feb 1938	12 Feb 1938	8	
Venus in Silk	Mizzy	Embassy Theatre	Peterborough	14 Feb 1938	19 Feb 1938	8	
Venus in Silk	Mizzy	Theatre Royal	Newcastle	21 Feb 1938	26 Feb 1938	8	
Venus in Silk	Mizzy	Garrick Theatre	Southport	28 Feb 1938	5 Mar 1938	8	
Venus in Silk	Mizzy	New Theatre Royal	Norwich	7 Mar 1938	12 Mar 1938	8	
Venus in Silk	Mizzy	Palace Theatre	Manchester	14 Mar 1938	19 Mar 1938	8	
Venus in Silk	Mizzy	Alhambra Theatre	Bradford	21 Mar 1938	26 Mar 1938	8	
Venus in Silk	Mizzy	Theatre Royal	Nottingham	28 Mar 1938	2 Apr 1938	8	
Venus in Silk	Mizzy	Grand Theatre	Leeds	4 Apr 1938	9 Apr 1938	8	
Venus in Silk	Mizzy	Opera House Theatre	Blackpool	11 Apr 1938	23 Apr 1938	16	
Going Greek	(Unknown)	(National tour)	South Africa	9 Jun 1939	? Aug 1939	?	
Swing Along	Miami	(National tour)	South Africa	9 Jun 1939	? Aug 1939	?	
The Fleet's Lit Up	Tilly	Hippodrome	Birmingham	20 Nov 1939	25 Nov 1939	13	
The Fleet's Lit Up	Tilly	Empire Theatre	Newcastle	27 Nov 1939	2 Dec 1939	13	
The Fleet's Lit Up	Tilly	Empire Theatre	Nottingham	4 Dec 1939	9 Dec 1939	13	
Aladdin and His Wonderful Lamp	Princess	Grand Theatre	Wolverhampton	26 Dec 1939	27 Jan 1940	44	
