= Felice Lascelles =

British actress (1904–1961)

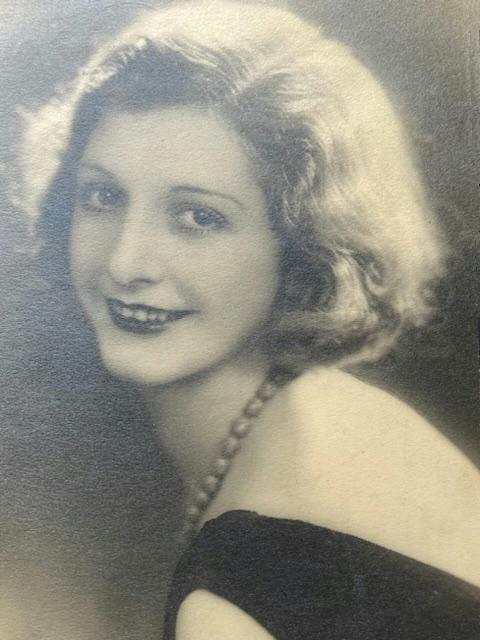
- Felice Lascelles (c. 1928)
- Born: Felicia Madge Lessels; 19 July 1904; Wallasey, Merseyside, (Note: Lascelles' birth place is disputed: O'Toole has Lisburn, County Antrim; Lessels Yates—a professional genealogist and distant relative—built the family tree recording Lascelles' birth place as Wallasey, Merseyside, as she herself stated in an interview with the Liverpool Evening Express on 14 September 1926. Whenever she performed in the Liverpool area, local papers would often refer to her association with Wallasey as a past resident.) England
- Died: 29 April 1961 (aged 56); London, England
- Occupation: Musical comedy actress
- Years active: Early 1920s–1940
- Children: Susan Neil; Andy Irvine

Felice Lascelles (née Felicia Madge Lessels; 19 July 1904 – 29 April 1961) was a British musical comedy actress, singer and dancer. She performed on stage in the UK and Ireland from the early 1920s to 1940, under the managements of George Grossmith Jr., Jack Buchanan, Charles Cochran, Leslie Henson, and Lee Ephraim.

She is best known for her lead roles in the national tours of Kid Boots (1926), Sunny (1927–1930), Darling, I Love You (1931), Stand Up and Sing (1932), and Venus in Silk (1939), among other shows. She took the lead in the pantomime adaptations of Goldilocks and the Three Bears (1930), Goody Two-Shoes (1931), and Aladdin and His Wonderful Lamp (1939–1940). She was the mother of stage actress Susan Neil and folk musician Andy Irvine.

== Early life ==
Lascelles was born Felicia Madge Lessels on 19 July 1904, in Wallasey, Merseyside. Her father, William Lessels, was born in Leeds and her mother, Elizabeth Malvina Cunningham, in Salford. The couple settled in Merseyside, and Felicia was the fourth of their seven children, five of whom survived into adulthood. The eldest child, Leonie Margaret Isabel Lessels (b. 13 May 1893), who later adopted the stage name of Leonie Lascelles, became a pianist and singer, and left Wallasey to start her career in London. One of Leonie's first advertised performances was in June 1912, in a sextet called The Gollies.

Felicia had performed at concerts from the age of five and, since she had always aspired to be an actress, also left Wallasey for London. In the early 1920s, after playing in silent films for three years from the age of 14, she decided to seek an engagement on the stage, even though she had no idea on how to obtain an audition. She simply turned up at the Winter Garden Theatre in London, and was offered a place in the chorus where she gained experience in her chosen profession, under the stage name of Felice Lascelles.

== Career ==
=== 1922–1926: Chorus girl and understudy ===
Lascelles began her stage career touring in two plays by George Grossmith Jr. & J. A. E. Malone. First, as a chorus girl in The Cabaret Girl (1922–1923), starring Margaret Campbell and Norman Griffin, which opened at the Grand Theatre, Blackpool, on Christmas Day, 25 December 1922, and closed at the King's Theatre, Hammersmith, on 8 December 1923. (Note: The touring schedule for The Cabaret Girl was split into two runs of 17 consecutive weeks each, with a break from 21 April (after the last show at the Lyceum Theatre, Sheffield) until 9 August (when the second run opened at the Grand Theatre, Blackpool). According to the Liverpool Evening Express, Griffin had taken the opportunity of this break to return to the Winter Garden Theatre, London, and play his part of "Gravvins" there during the summer season.) In the second play, The Beauty Prize (1923–1924), which opened at the Royal Lyceum Theatre, Edinburgh, on 24 December 1923 and closed at the Prince's Theatre, Manchester, on 3 May 1924 for a total of 130 performances, she played the small role of Shinny Fane alongside Joan Lockton, Claude Hulbert and Peter Haddon. The Stage praised her performance in two reviews, and the Liverpool Evening Express described her as "a young and promising Liverpool artiste."

Lascelles toured with Jack Buchanan's company in both Toni (1924) and Boodle (1925). She joined the chorus line in Toni, which had initially been rehearsed during a trial week starting on 6 August 1923 at the Theatre Royal, Hanley, followed immediately by a tour of 34 further venues (Note: Buchanan played the lead role in Toni from 6 August 1923 until the end of the shows at the Grand Theatre, Wolverhampton, on Saturday 1 December 1923, when he left—temporarily—to join André Charlot's London Revue of 1924. This new show's trial week drew big audiences, including the Prince of Wales, at the Hippodrome, Golders Green, when it opened on Monday 3 December. The national tour of Toni resumed four weeks later at the Royal Theatre, Brighton, on Monday 24 December, with Leo Franklyn in the lead role. On 17 December, André Charlot's company, numbering 42, with its principals—Buchanan, Beatrice Lillie, and Gertrude Lawrence—and its chorus of two dozen girls, left Waterloo station on the Southampton boat train, and sailed to America on the RMS Aquitania two days later. Their first performance was given at the Apollo Theatre in Atlantic City on New Year's Eve, and relocated to the Times Square Theatre, New York, a week later. Buchanan, having committed only to the minimum 16-week run, returned to London on 21 April 1924, for rehearsals of Toni, scheduled to open its long run at the Shaftesbury Theatre on 12 May 1924.) that ended at the Prince of Wales Theatre, Birmingham, on 5 May 1924, right before its run of 248 performances at the Shaftesbury Theatre, London, from 12 May to 13 December 1924. (Note: Lascelles' role in Toni is not credited among the principal actors by Wearing, nor in any of the cast lists published for the trial week at the Theatre Royal, Hanley; for the 34-venues nationwide tour; or for the London run at the Shaftesbury Theatre. She might therefore have been in the chorus line during the initial shows in late 1923, i.e. before the opening of The Beauty Prize on 24 December 1923 (in which she played Shinny Fane), although this presupposes that she left the chorus line of The Cabaret Girl before it closed on 8 December 1923. More likely, Lascelles joined the chorus line of Toni for the full run at the Shaftesbury Theatre (12 May — 13 December 1924), i.e. after the close of The Beauty Prize on 3 May 1924, and before the opening of Boodle on 26 December 1924 (in which she played Phyllis).) Lascelles then played Phyllis in Boodle, starring Buchanan, June Tripp and Elsie Randolph, which opened at the Prince of Wales Theatre, Birmingham, on 26 December 1924, where it remained until 24 January 1925. It then toured through Liverpool, Glasgow, Edinburgh, Hull, and Manchester, closing there on 7 March, and opened at the Empire Theatre, London, on 10 March for 94 performances, closing on 30 May 1925.

Later that year, Lascelles joined the cast of Charles B. Cochran's On With the Dance, which starred Alice Delysia and Leonid Massine, and included songs by Noël Coward. In addition to playing a small, uncredited comedy part, (Note: Lascelles' "small comedy part" in On with the Dance is not credited in Mander & Mitchenson.) Lascelles understudied Hermione Baddeley for a year. The show opened at the London Pavilion on 30 April and closed on 14 November, after 229 performances. Five days after its run ended, a new edition of this show—minus the Coward material—called Still Dancing, opened at the same venue on 19 November, with the same cast, including Lascelles in several scenes, and Florence Desmond, with whom she was sharing a dressing room. A preview, published in the Weekly Dispatch on 15 November, included her photo, captioned: "Felice Lascelles, to appear in Still Dancing, the new revue at the Pavilion." The show closed on 27 February 1926, after 114 performances.

=== 1926–1930: Kid Boots and Sunny ===
Lascelles was again part of a chorus in the 1926 run of Kid Boots at the Winter Garden, London, when Leslie Henson saw her rehearsing as understudy to the leading lady and made her an offer of her first leading part as Polly in that play's national tour, which opened at the Prince of Wales Theatre, Birmingham, on 16 August 1926, and in which she sang "The Two Of Us" with Claude Bailey. In addition to Henson in the principal role, the initial cast included Robert Nainby, Guy Fane, Fedora Roselli, and Viola Compton, as well as the brother-and-sister duo of dancers, Eric & Rene Le Fre. After the last show of Kid Boots at the Liverpool Empire Theatre, Lascelles switched to playing the part of Beth on 27 September at the King's Theatre, Glasgow and for the remainder of the tour, (Note: The role of Polly was taken on by Annie Croft, who held it until the last show in Bradford on 16 October 1926, after which it was played by Margaret Campbell until the end of the tour.) which closed at the Hippodrome, Golders Green, on 29 January 1927, for 157 performances.

Lascelles starred in the title role of Sunny Peters in the national tour of Sunny (1927–1930), presented by Jack Buchanan and Lee Ephraim, in which she sang "Who?", "Do You Love Me?", "The Wedding Knell", and "When we get our Divorce". After a dress rehearsal on Sunday night, 3 July 1927, personally conducted by Buchanan, the tour opened at the Hippodrome Theatre in Margate on 4 July. The cast included Max Kirby (in Buchanan's original role of Jim Demming), Rex Rodgers, Naylor Grimson, George Neil, Ethel Stewart, Kathleen Burgess, and Iris White as principal dancer. The whole company was deemed about the strongest on the road, with over 70 people: performers, bandsmen, stage carpenters, baggage men, flymen, wardrobe women and dressmakers. Nineteen tons of scenery and electrical effects were carried in seven railway carriages, including one for the horse and the dogs. This musical comedy was so popular that the partnership of Ephraim and Buchanan had two companies—identified as companies A and B in The Stage—touring it simultaneously in the provinces and some London boroughs. (Note: Company A, starring Lalla Collins—who had been understudy to Binnie Hale as "Sunny" at the London Hippodrome—in the title role, was assembled in late 1926 and had a run of 24 consecutive weeks in 10 venues, opening at the Alhambra Theatre, Glasgow, on 13 December 1926, and closing at the Palace Theatre, Manchester, on 28 May 1927. After a break, that company resumed touring at the King's Theatre, Southsea, on 1 August 1927, with Elsa Brown taking over as "Sunny", during an intermittent run that closed on 28 April 1928 at the Borough Theatre, Stratford. Company B, starring Lascelles as "Sunny", was assembled in time to open at the Hippodrome Theatre, Margate, on 4 July 1927, for a long tour that closed at the Hippodrome Theatre, Ilford, on 31 May 1930. In 1932, Lee Ephraim organised a new, one-week tour at the Alhambra Theatre, Glasgow (6–11 June 1932), with Lalla Collins returning as "Sunny". Lascelles reprised the role for a final time during Lee Ephraim's short, year-end seasonal run from 24 December 1932 to 21 January 1933.) Lascelles' company B did so for nearly three years, closing at the Hippodrome in Ilford on 31 May 1930, with Lascelles performing throughout the whole run, except for an absence of ten weeks due to illness, from 26 December 1927 until 27 February 1928, during which Pearl Greene stood in for her. (Note: Lascelles became unwell during the Monday, 26 December 1927 performance at the King's Theatre in Dundee and her understudy, a 17-year old chorus girl named Miss Boulson, stood in for part of the show and again full time the next day, when Lascelles was rushed to the Dundee Infirmary to undergo emergency surgery for appendicitis. On Saturday 7 January 1928, Pearl Greene took over the lead role of Sunny from Boulson for the last day of the Dundee run, and for the following eight weeks, at: the Empire in South Shields (9 January); the Empire in West Hartlepool (16 January); the Opera House in Middlesbrough (23 January); the Hippodrome in Darlington (30 January); the Theatre Royal in York (6 February); the Grand Theatre in Hull (13 February) and the Hippodrome in Huddersfield (20 February), after which Lascelles returned to the role on 27 February 1928, at the Theatre Royal in Halifax.)

=== 1930–1932: Goldilocks to Goody Two-Shoes ===
Lascelles' first leading appearance in pantomime was as Goldilocks in Goldilocks and the Three Bears (1929–1930), in which she sang "Tip-Toes", and Elsie Prince was Principal boy (Roland). This show opened at the Theatre Royal, Birmingham, on 21 December 1929 and closed there on 1 February 1930, after eight weeks. One week into the run, the reviewer for the Sunday Mercury—"Astra"—commented on Lascelles' performance: "Goldilocks and the Three Bears is her first experience in pantomime, and she has made good. It would be difficult to find a more graceful principal girl."

For most of 1931, Lascelles joined the national tour of Darling, I Love You, a musical comedy starring Gus McNaughton, in which she played Peggy Sylvester, the show's heroine, after taking over from Elsie Arnold for her first performance in that role at the Theatre Royal, Huddersfield, on 19 January. When the show was at the Royal Court Theatre, Liverpool, for the second week after Lascelles joined the tour, the reviewer for the Liverpool Echo reported that: "Miss Felice Lascelles, a pretty and graceful heroine in voice and presence, learned in a tribute of flowers how Merseyside rejoices in the success of its local talent." By the time the company reached the Empress Theatre, Brixton, on 23 November 1931, Lascelles had passed the role of Peggy on to Lillian Newman.

For that year's winter season, she had been pre-announced for the role of principal girl in the pantomime adaptation of Robinson Crusoe. However, she joined another pantomime instead, Goody Two-Shoes, which opened at the Theatre Royal, Exeter, on 26 December 1931. She played the lead role of Goody, and Irene Lister was the Principal boy (Colin). In that role, she sang solo: "Tie a little string about your finger", "Prince Charming", and "All Change for Happiness", as well as duets with Lister: "For You" and "Close Your Eyes". The show closed on 13 February 1932, after 69 performances.

=== 1932–1933: Stand Up and Sing to Follow the Girl ===
After taking a long break around the birth of her daughter in June 1932, Lascelles returned to the stage in October of that year, playing the role of Ena in the national tour of Stand Up and Sing, in which she sang "Mercantile Marine" and "Take It or Leave It". This run opened at the Grand Theatre, Wolverhampton, on 31 October 1932, and was suspended after the 10 December show at the Empire Theatre, Leeds, to be merged into the Christmas season organised by Lee Ephraim at the Empire Theatre in Newcastle (see next paragraph). On Saturday, 3 December 1932, Lascelles and Eric Fawcett—among other members of the cast of Stand Up and Sing and other theatrical companies—volunteered to appear in a charity special matinee performance at the Empire Theatre, Sheffield, in aid of Sheffield Council of Social Service, in which they sang the amusing duet "It's Not You".

During Lee Ephraim's Musical Comedy Season, which took place from 24 December 1932 to 21 January 1933 at the Empire Theatre in Newcastle, Lascelles was part of a company of 80 artists assembled to perform in three of Jack Buchanan's musical comedy shows in succession over four weeks: Sunny, That's a Good Girl, and Stand Up and Sing. At the end of the first performance of Sunny on 24 December, after Lascelles had reprised her leading role of Sunny for the first time in nearly two years, the delighted audience called for repeated curtains and Eric Fawcett—who played Jack Buchanan's original part of Jim Demming—addressed the audience in appreciation. For the second of these three shows, opening on 2 January 1933, Lascelles debuted her role of Moya Malone in That's a Good Girl, in which she sang "Fancy Our Meeting" with Eric Hodges as Francis Moray, and the principals were Fawcett as Bill Barrow and Ethel Stewart as Joy Dean. For the third show, opening on 9 January 1933, Lascelles played the role of Mary Clyde-Burkin in Stand Up and Sing, departing from her usual role of Ena which was, on this run, performed instead by Ethel Stewart, who had originally played it opposite Jack Buchanan. The fourth and final week, opening on 16 January 1933, was divided between re-runs of Sunny and That's a Good Girl, with three consecutive days allocated to each play. Later in 1933, Lascelles was "the girl" in Follow the Girl, a show that was well received but ran for only three weeks, one each at the Palace Theatre in Halifax on 30 October, at the Opera House in Blackpool on 20 November, and at the Theatre Royal in Brighton on 27 November.

=== 1935–1936: Concert party and Variety shows ===
On 17 June 1935, Lascelles and her husband George Neil joined one of Will Seymour's Bubbles concert party companies (Note: Will Seymour was a theatre actor, producer and director who, in the spring and summer of 1935, ran two separate concert party companies presenting Bubbles. Company 1 played a trial week at the South Parade Pier in Southsea on 20 May, before opening for their third consecutive summer residency at the Grove Park Pavilion, Weston-Super-Mare, on 8 June, closing on 30 September. Its artists, directed by Will Seymour, were: Connie Clive, Helen Brothers, Madeline Rossiter, Douglas Young, Trevor Watkins, Harry Brunning, Peggy and Betty Nicholls, and Seymour himself, with Winifred Swinford at the piano. Company 2 played a trial week at the Princess Pier in Torquay on 17 June, prior to opening their own summer season's residency at the Victoria Pavilion in Ilfracombe on 1 July, closing on 21 September. Its artists, directed by George Neil, were: Gwen Adeler, Eileen Cusack, Felice Lascelles, Harry Turner, and Neil himself, with Jacqueline & Leo Conriche at the pianos.) for a trial week at the Princess Pier in Torquay, with Lascelles playing a soubrette and dancer, and Neil directing as well as performing light comedy. On 1 July, the show relocated to the Victoria Pavilion, Ilfracombe, for the summer season's residency, closing on 21 September after 12 weeks. Their performance was also relayed on regional radio, at 8pm on 9 July.

The following year, Lascelles appeared as herself, performing in the Gaiety Whirl of 1936, a yearly variety show organised by Ben Popplewell & Sons Ltd. at the Gaiety Theatre, Ayr for the whole summer, opening on 8 June and closing on 3 October, totalling 204 performances. However, she left the show on 26 September, before the final week at Ayr, where she was replaced by Caprice Proud who remained with the company when they went on a short tour at the Theatre Royal, Edinburgh (5–17 October) and at the Pavilion Theatre, Glasgow (19–31 October).

=== 1938–1940: Venus In Silk to Aladdin and His Wonderful Lamp ===
Lascelles was Mizzi in Venus In Silk (1938), a musical comedy written by Robert Stolz and starring Carl Brisson, Kitty Reidy, Leo Franklyn, and Arthur Rigby. In this role, she sang three songs with Franklyn's Lt. Ladislaus: "One Will Do For Two", "Get Your Man", and "We'll Hire a Skiff". Although it had been intended for a West End production, the show stayed away from London because of the war, but toured in the provinces, opening at the Kings Theatre, Southsea on 30 January 1938 and closing at the Opera House Theatre, Blackpool on 23 April, for a total of 96 performances.

When World War II broke out in September 1939, Lascelles had been in South Africa and Rhodesia with Leslie Henson's Gaiety Company since June of that year, performing in Going Greek (Note: Going Greek was a musical comedy in two acts, by Guy Bolton, Fred Thomson, and Douglas Furber, directed by Leslie Henson & Herbert Bryan, with lyrics and music by Sam Lerner, Al Goodhart and Al Hoffman, and choreography by Jack Donohue. It had been produced at Blackpool under the management of Leslie Henson on 30 August 1937 for two weeks, then opened at the Gaiety Theatre, London, on 16 September 1937 for a run of 303 performances, closing on 11 June 1938. On the 1939 South African tour, the cast included Henson, Lascelles and her husband George Neil, Richard Hearne, Ivy Tresmand, Gavin Gordon, Rosalind Atkinson, Richard Caldicot, John E. Coyle, George Nelson, and Leslie Spurling, with choreography arranged by Pat Gaunt.) and Swing Along, (Note: Swing Along was a musical comedy in two acts, also by Guy Bolton, Fred Thomson, and Douglas Furber, directed by Leslie Henson & Herbert Bryan, with lyrics by Graham John, music by Martin Broones, and choreography by Fred Lord. It had been produced at the Opera House, Manchester, under the management of Firth Shephard on 17 August 1936 for two weeks, then opened at the Gaiety Theatre, London, on 2 September 1936 for a run of 311 performances, closing on 5 June 1937. On the 1939 South African tour, the cast was the same as in Going Greek, with Lascelles playing the role of "Miami", which had been performed by Zelma O'Neal in London.) on a tour that was scheduled to end in late autumn. But on 1 September, they left for England on a blacked-out liner, the Windsor Castle. During the voyage, which ended on 26 September, the company entertained the other passengers, as well as the crews of three naval vessels one afternoon on 15 September, during a stay in port at Sierra Leone for seven days while waiting for a warship to escort the liner back to England.

Back in England, Lascelles played the role of Tilly alongside Billy Tasker and Helen Barnes in The Fleet's Lit Up, which opened at the Hippodrome, Birmingham, on 20 November 1939, and closed at the Empire Theatre, Nottingham, on 9 December, after 39 performances. Her final appearance on stage was as the Princess in that Christmas season's pantomime adaptation of Aladdin and His Wonderful Lamp at the Grand Theatre, Wolverhampton, with Elsie Prince in the role of Aladdin; this show ran from 26 December 1939 to 27 January 1940, for 44 performances.

== Personal life ==
In January 1927, Lascelles secretly married actor George Anderson Neil in Newcastle when they were on tour in Kid Boots at the Empire Theatre, from 27 December 1926 until 22 January 1927. At the time, Neil had been her fellow principal in that show, and later in Sunny. They had a daughter, Susan Neil, born on 13 June 1932, who also became an actress. From a second marriage to Archibald Kennedy Irvine in 1941, Lascelles gave birth on 14 June 1942 to a son, Andrew, who started out as a child actor in 1950 and performed on stage, in film, and on TV. As a teenager, he also studied classical guitar and eventually moved to Ireland in 1962, where he carried on acting for a while before changing careers to become a folk musician, known as Andy Irvine.

Lascelles died of cancer on 29 April 1961.

She had a great collection of 78s, songs from long-forgotten musical comedies that I listened to on a wind-up gramophone. She was wonderful. Regretfully, I didn't listen enough to all the stories she had when she was alive. She always had to be the centre of attention. As I always say about her: she may have given up the stage, but she never stopped acting!

— Andy Irvine, The Humours of Planxty, "The Child Actor", by Leagues O'Toole (2006).

== Works ==
=== Musical theatre ===
- The Cabaret Girl (1922–1923) – (Chorus girl)
- The Beauty Prize (1923–1924) – Shinny Fane
- Toni (1924) – (Small part, uncredited / Chorus)
- Boodle (1925) – Phyllis
- On with the Dance (1925) – (Small part, uncredited / understudy to Hermione Baddeley)
- Still Dancing (1925–1926) – One of the Ladies
- Kid Boots (1926–1927) – Chorus girl / understudy (London run); first Polly, then Beth (National tour)
- Sunny (1927–1930) – Sunny Peters
- Goldilocks and the Three Bears (1929–1930) – Goldilocks
- Darling I Love You (1931) – Peggy Sylvester
- Goody Two-Shoes (1931–1932) – Goody
- Stand up and Sing (1932) – Ena / Mary Clyde-Burkin
- That's a Good Girl (1933) – Moya Malone
- Follow the Girl (1933) – Girl
- Bubbles (1935) – Soubrette and dancer
- Gaiety Whirl of 1936 (1936) – As herself
- Venus In Silk (1938) – Mizzi
- Going Greek (1939) – (Unknown)
- Swing Along (1939) – Miami
- The Fleet's Lit Up (1939) – Tilly
- Aladdin and His Wonderful Lamp (1939–1940) – Princess

=== Partial filmography ===
In an interview with the Liverpool Evening Express in September 1926, Lascelles said that she "has acted on many occasions for the films, but prefers the stage, and in particular musical comedy." In an April 1928 interview with the Leicester Chronicle, she stated having acted in film for three years and that, although quite young, she often played older roles, adding that, at 15, she played a mother of three. In 1939, a theatre programme featuring her mini-biography mentioned that, at the age of 14, she was made up to look like a young woman of 28.

- Love and the Whirlwind (1922)
