= Susan Neil =

British actress (1932–2021)

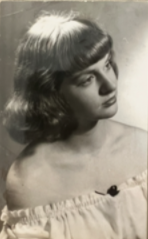
- Susan Neil (c. 1949)
- Born: Susan J. Neil; 13 June 1932; Kensington, London, UK
- Died: 10 October 2021 (aged 89); Paddington, London, UK
- Occupation: Actress
- Years active: 1949–1958
- Spouse: Lawrence Ashmore (m. 1956)
- Parent(s): George A. Neil; Felice Lascelles
- Relatives: Andy Irvine (half-brother)

Susan Neil (13 June 1932 – 10 October 2021) was an English actress on the stage, radio and television in the 1950s. She is best known for touring nationally in comedy with Leslie Henson (1955 and 1957), Wally Patch (1956), and George Formby (1958).

She was the daughter of actors George Anderson Neil and Felice Lascelles, and the half-sister of child actor and folk musician Andy Irvine.

== Early life ==
Susan Neil was born in London on 13 June 1932, to Felice Lascelles and George Anderson Neil. Her parents had both been in the theatre as principals in musical comedies such as Kid Boots (1926) and Sunny (1927–1930). Susan attended Broombank School, Selsey, Sussex, (Note: Broombank School offered "sound education with special facilities for music and art". It was housed in the former residence of the music hall entertainer Bransby Williams, next to the Selsey Hotel. The owner/headmaster from the early 1950s until the school's closure was William Percy Higgs (died Bristol 1986), a former Cambridge University organ scholar and music master at Eton. Higgs made Broombank a music and arts school attracting the children of well-known actors, artists and musicians as well as temporary pupils from France, whose numbers occasionally matched those of the British children. The school closed in 1969.) where, in July 1946, she passed the examination for the College of Preceptors and the elocution examination of the L.A.M.D.A., both with distinction. In 1949, while attending boarding school in Switzerland, she decided to become an actress and secured a placement for six months in repertory, training as a student at the Embassy Theatre, London.

I was surprised when she wrote from Switzerland and told me she was going to be a dramatic actress. She is an excellent writer and I thought journalism might be her career, but I knew I couldn't change her mind even if I wanted to; she's good, you know.

—Felice Lascelles, quoted in "Views and News", Hampstead News (4 August 1949).

== Stage career ==
One of Neil's first advertised roles was as "Pheasant" in Whiteoaks by Mazo De La Roche, presented by the Playhouse Repertory Company at the Playhouse Theatre, Buxton, on 13–18 June 1949. The cast included Joan Sanderson, Myles Rudge, Shaun Sutton, and Richard Bebb. A month later, she played the role of the "American girl" in Fit for Heroes, by Harold Brooke and Kay Bannerman, at the Embassy Theatre, London, on Thursday 28 July 1949. The cast included Raymond Lovell, Phyllis Neilson-Terry, Sheila Burrell, and Laurence Payne. Early in the following year, she was "one of two girls" in James Forsyth's The Medicine Man, also at the Embassy Theatre, London, on Tuesday, 14 February 1950, with the "other girl" played by Marjorie Thomson. The rest of the cast featured Archie Duncan, Russell Hunter, Jack Stewart, and Betty Henderson.

In early 1952, Neil played the role of "Sheila Watkins" in Patrick Cargill's Desire in the Night, at the Pavilion, Liverpool, on 24–29 March, for 12 performances, and the following week at the Dolphin Theatre, Brighton, on 31 March – 5 April, for 9 performances. The rest of the cast comprised Alathea Siddons, Carleen Lord, Colin Archer, Winnie Sloane, and John Forbes-Robertson.

In April 1952, Neil joined the Forbes-Russell Repertory Company (Note: In 1952, the Forbes-Russell Repertory Company included: Peter Forbes-Russell as general manager, George Ricarde as manager, Peter Drew as stage director, and Marigold Sharman as assistant stage manager. The regular company of players were Donald Carter, Barbara Cole, Peter Drew, Eric Lindsay, Susan Neil, George Ricarde, Marigold Sharman, Olive Sloane, Mable Spencer, Haydn Williams, and Peter Wilson. In July 1953, Neil was no longer listed as part of the company.) to perform in three successive plays at the Palace Pier, Brighton, in association with Butlin's Ltd. The first was as "Christina Deed" in John Dighton's comedy, Who Goes There?, on 12–19 April, for 10 performances; the second was as "Peggy Dobson" in R. C. Sherriff's Home at Seven, on 21–26 April, for 7 performances; and the third was as "Rose" in Boy Wanted, a play by Jonty Dewhurst, on 28 April – 3 May, for 8 performances. A few weeks later, she appeared with Joseph Fisher in the same company's production of Henry Wilkinson's comedy Mountain Air, on 17–21 June, for 5 performances at the Butlin Theatre, Skegness. In August 1952, she was again listed with the Forbes-Russell Repertory Company when it was partnering with the Butlin's holiday camp in Filey, where the actors also performed separately at the nearby Southdene Pavilion.

At the end of the following year, she was "Molly Manners" in The Fortune Hunters, by Mark Paul, at the Kemble Theatre, Hereford, on 7–12 December 1953, for 7 performances, in a cast that featured Laurie Main and included Pat Franklin, Terence Hankins, Peter Street, Joanna Clarke, Winifred Braemar, Jennifer Hutt, and Francis Hampton.

In early August 1955, Leslie Henson assembled a new company for another tour of Mary Chase's Harvey, (Note: After Sid Field died during a performance of Harvey on Friday 3 February 1950, his role as "Elwood P. Dowd" was played for a few days by his understudy, Harry Brunning. Leslie Henson took over the part and first performed it on Saturday 11 February 1950 for a month at the Prince of Wales Theatre, London. The play moved to the Piccadilly Theatre on Tuesday 14 March 1950, where it closed on Saturday 1 July 1950 after a total West End run of 613 performances. Leslie Henson then took it on tour for a run of 24 consecutive venues, opening at the Wimbledon Theatre on Monday 17 July 1950, and closing at the Prince of Wales Theatre, Cardiff on Saturday 20 January 1951.) with Neil in the role of "Myrtle Mae Simmons". After suffering a heart attack on 13 August while on holiday in Jersey, Henson recovered quickly but delegated his role of "Elwood P. Dowd", first to Clifford Mollison for the play's opening at the Marlowe Theatre, Canterbury (22–27 August), and then to Bobby Howes for the following three weeks at the Streatham Hill Theatre, Lambeth (29 August–3 September), at the Hippodrome, Golders Green (5–10 September), and at the Devonshire Park Theatre, Eastbourne (12–17 September), where the run ended. The cast also included Marjorie Hawtrey, Ann Burton, Stuart Wagstaff, and Harry Brunning.

In 1956, Neil played the role of "Natalie Sparling" in a national tour of This Happy Home, a comedy by Michael Wilson, along with a cast that included Wally Patch, Doreen Season, Susan Arnold, C. Denier Warren, Gawn Grainger, Dorothy Summers, and Barbara Robins. The first half of the tour opened at the Palace Theatre, Leicester, on 19 March, and closed at the Marlowe Theatre, Canterbury, on 21 April. After a three-month break, the second half of the tour opened at the Theatre Royal, Nottingham, on 23 July, and closed at the Empire Theatre, Sunderland, on 1 September.

List of venues toured for This Happy Home (March–September 1956)

Theatre	Location	Opening date	Closing date	# of perf.	Ref.
Palace Theatre	Leicester	19 March 1956	24 March 1956	12	
Theatre Royal	Norwich	26 March 1956	31 March 1956	? (Note: The source(s) provide(s) only the opening date, venue and location, not the opening times or number of performances.)	
Royal Hall	Harrogate	2 April 1956	7 April 1956	?	
Hippodrome	Derby	9 April 1956	14 April 1956	?	
Marlowe Theatre	Canterbury	16 April 1956	21 April 1956	?	
Theatre Royal	Nottingham	23 July 1956	28 July 1956	7	
Empire Theatre	Swansea	30 July 1956	4 August 1956	?	
Theatre Royal	Hanley	6 August 1956	11 August 1956	12	
Hippodrome	Golders Green	13 August 1956	18 August 1956	8	
Streatham Hill Theatre	Lambeth	20 August 1956	25 August 1956	?	
Empire Theatre	Sunderland	27 August 1956	1 September 1956	12	

In 1957, Neil reprised her role of "Myrtle Mae Simmons" in Harvey—with Leslie Henson back as "Elwood P. Dowd"—during a four-week tour of the British Forces in Rhineland, Germany, starting on Monday 8 July. The cast included Amelia Bayntun, Bee Duffell, Anne Burton, John Bonney, Frank Henderson, Joan Deering, Sydney Arnold, and Roger Williams.

In 1958, Neil played the role of "Sally Pearson", the attractive daughter, in Beside the Seaside, a comedy by Leslie Sands, during a 12-week tour (10 March – 31 May) in the provinces. The cast featured George Formby as her father, "Wilf Pearson", and Barbara Mitchell as his wife, "Ethel Pearson". The rest of the cast included Doreen Andrew, Anne Jameson, Michael Lomax, Dennis Spencer, and Rosemary Towler, while Nancy Roberts and Kathleen St John shared the role of "Mrs Austin", each for six weeks. The tour opened at the New Theatre, Hull, on 10 March, and closed at the Theatre Royal, Nottingham, on 31 May, after 96 performances. On 27 May, the reviewer from the Nottingham Guardian wrote that "Susan Neil is charming and pleasant as Sally".

List of venues toured for Beside the Seaside (March–May 1958)

Theatre	Location	Opening date	Closing date	# of perf.	Ref.
New Theatre	Hull	10 March 1958	15 March 1958	7	
Lyceum Theatre	Sheffield	17 March 1958	22 March 1958	8	
Hippodrome Theatre	Brighton	24 March 1958	29 March 1958	8	
Pavilion Theatre	Bournemouth	31 March 1958	5 April 1958	?	
Alexandra Theatre	Birmingham	7 April 1958	12 April 1958	8	
New Theatre	Oxford	14 April 1958	19 April 1958	8	
Opera House	Manchester	21 April 1958	26 April 1958	8	
Grand Theatre	Blackpool	28 April 1958	3 May 1958	?	
Royal Court Theatre,	Liverpool	5 May 1958	10 May 1958	9	
Grand Theatre	Leeds	12 May 1958	17 May 1958	8	
Coventry Theatre	Coventry	19 May 1958	24 May 1958	8	
Theatre Royal	Nottingham	26 May 1958	31 May 1958	8	

One of Neil's final roles on the stage was as "Sally Middleton" in The Voice of the Turtle, a comedy by John William Van Druten, at the Intimate Theatre, High Wycombe, on 16–21 June 1958, with Ivor Kimmel and Tangie Bird.

== Radio and TV ==
In 1953, Neil performed in roles broadcast on the BBC Home Service, including unknown parts in Paul Temple and Steve Again (13 April 1953), and in Evelyn Russell's adaptation of Graham Greene's Brighton Rock (13 July 1953). Two months later, she was "Elaine Didsbury" in The Secret Agent, adapted for radio by Felix Felton and produced by Martyn C. Webster, which was broadcast twice (12 & 17 September 1953) as part of the Saturday Night Theatre series.

A mini-biography published in the theatre programme for the German tour of Harvey in 1957 stated that Neil had "made a big success in television with the Ted Ray series". Her first television role was in that show, broadcast on Saturday 26 May 1956, where she featured as Tarzan's "jungle girl" to ex-champion wrestler Joe Robinson.

== Personal life ==
Susan Neil was the half-sister of child actor and folk musician Andy Irvine, born on 14 June 1942 from Lascelles' second marriage to Archibald Kennedy Irvine in 1941.

On 4 August 1954, Neil was the first person to be selected for the Daily Mail's "Dream Wish" competition, to fulfil her dream to pull pints at the Star Tavern near her home at Grove End Road, St John's Wood.

Soon Susan was pulling beer that the regulars could drink without grimacing. It usually takes a week for a barmaid to learn the art of pulling a pint—but Susan was quick on the draw. What was Susan's verdict of the day her dream wish came true? "My feet ache, and my arms ache", she said. "But I enjoyed it. The funniest thing is seeing people only from the waist up". "And now, after your day's work, let me get you a drink", said pub owner Mr. Jones. "Thanks," said Susan happily. "I'll have a fizzy lemonade."

—Keith Waterhouse, "Barmaid for a day!", Daily Mirror (4 August 1954).

She married Lawrence Ashmore (born 'Robinson') at Christ Church, Lancaster Gate, on 15 September 1956.

Susan Neil died on 10 October 2021, in St Mary's Hospital, Paddington, London.

== Works ==
=== Theatre ===
- Whiteoaks (1949) – "Pheasant"
- Fit for Heroes (1949) – "American girl"
- The Medicine Man (1950) – "One of two girls"
- Desire in the Night (1952) – "Sheila Watkins"
- Who Goes There? (1952) – "Christina Deed"
- Home at Seven (1952) – "Peggy Dobson"
- Boy Wanted (1952) – "Rose"
- Mountain Air (1952) – (Unknown)
- The Fortune Hunters (1953) – "Molly Manners"
- Harvey (1955) – "Myrtle Mae Simmons"
- This Happy Home (1956) – "Natalie Sparling"
- Harvey (1957) – "Myrtle Mae Simmons"
- Beside the Seaside (1958) – "Sally Pearson"
- The Voice of the Turtle (1958) – "Sally Middleton"

=== Radio ===
- Paul Temple and Steve Again (1953) – (Unknown)
- Brighton Rock (1953) – (Unknown)
- The Secret Agent (1953) – "Elaine Didsbury"

=== Television ===
- The Ted Ray Show (1956) – "Jane"
