= Beside the Seaside =

1958 play

Beside the Seaside is a comedy play in three acts by British actor and playwright Leslie Sands. A notable production was promoted in 1958 by Derek Salberg and directed by Maxwell Wray during a 12-week national tour (10 March – 31 May) for 96 performances in the provinces, starring George Formby, Barbara Mitchell, Susan Neil, Nancy Roberts, and Kathleen St John.

== Background ==
Beside the Seaside was written by Leslie Sands—under the pen name of "Barney Stevens"—as the first of his Seaside Trilogy of comedy plays; the second was A Basinful of Briny, and the third Good Old Summertime.

Although Beside the Seaside was written as a straight play, not a musical, Formby included performances of two songs during the 1958 tour: "Leaning on a Lamp-post" and "Swimmin' With The Wimmin'".

== Synopsis ==
A good-hearted Lancashire couple, Wilf and Ethel Pearson, are on holiday with their attractive daughter Sally at "Seaview", a drab boarding-house overlooking the gasworks in a seaside resort "somewhere in the North". They run into trouble with their grasping landlady, the battle-axe Mrs Austin, whom Wilf has to placate. He must also bring an end to a violent row between a honeymoon couple, Mr and Mrs Pepper, and avert the elopement of his own daughter with fellow guest Tony Brett, a philandering Canadian actor and married man. Brett performs in concert party at the local Pier with melodramatic actress Pat Marlow, also resident at "Seaview". Florrie is Mrs Austin's slapstick maid.

== Cast ==
The cast of the 1958 tour was as follows, in order of appearance:

- Nancy Roberts/Kathleen St John as Mrs Austin (Note: Nancy Roberts (well known for playing "Grandma Grove" in The Grove Family) played Mrs Austin for the first six weeks of the tour, beginning in Hull (10 March 1958) and until the last performance in Oxford (19 April); Kathleen St John took over the role for the last six weeks, beginning in Manchester (21 April) and until the end of the run in Nottingham (31 May).)
- Rosemary Towler as Pat Marlow
- Doreen Andrew as Florrie
- Dennis Spencer as Tony Brett
- Barbara Mitchell as Ethel Pearson
- George Formby as Wilf Pearson
- Susan Neil as Sally Pearson
- Michael Lomax as Mr Pepper
- Anne Jameson as Mrs Pepper

== Performances ==
The following table lists the venues visited during the 1958 tour.

Theatre	Location	Opening date	Closing date	# of perf.	Ref.
New Theatre	Hull	10 March 1958	15 March 1958	7	
Lyceum Theatre	Sheffield	17 March 1958	22 March 1958	8	
Hippodrome Theatre	Brighton	24 March 1958	29 March 1958	8	
Pavilion Theatre	Bournemouth	31 March 1958	5 April 1958	8? (Note: The source(s) provide(s) only the opening date, venue and location, not the opening times or number of performances.)	
Alexandra Theatre	Birmingham	7 April 1958	12 April 1958	8	
New Theatre	Oxford	14 April 1958	19 April 1958	8	
Opera House	Manchester	21 April 1958	26 April 1958	8	
Grand Theatre	Blackpool	28 April 1958	3 May 1958	8?	
Royal Court Theatre,	Liverpool	5 May 1958	10 May 1958	9	
Grand Theatre	Leeds	12 May 1958	17 May 1958	8	
Coventry Theatre	Coventry	19 May 1958	24 May 1958	8	
Theatre Royal	Nottingham	26 May 1958	31 May 1958	8	

== Critical reception ==
On 17 April 1958, Alan Bendle of the Manchester Evening News wrote: "This is one of those comedies full of unsophisticated laughter through which George drifts happily with an effect the greater because of its apparent lack of direction or effort."

On 2 May 1958, the reviewer of the Liverpool Echo—"H.W.R."— wrote: "It is apparently becoming fashionable for leading music-hall comedians to try their fortunes in straight plays, and at the Court Theatre next week we are to see George Formby's second venture in this field. Leslie Sands's comedy Beside the Seaside sounds like an ideal vehicle for the irrepressible George who, of course, lives in the Blackpool area and, as the action takes place in a seaside boarding house, should be in his element."

On 6 May 1958, the Liverpool Daily Post reviewer—"N.H."— wrote: "Beside the Seaside is as homely, as inconsequential, and every bit as corny as it sounds. (...) Despite all this, last night's audience found plenty to delight them, and the nasty-minded critics left the theatre in a considerable minority. The moral seems to be that those who have not yet seen their fill of boarding-house comedies will find this a good specimen of its kind. And there is an opportunity–far too rare nowadays–of hearing Mr Formby sing "Leaning on a Lamp-post"."

On 16 May 1958, the reviewer of the Coventry Standard commented: "Beside the Seaside [is] a new comedy by Leslie Sands, at which audiences all over England have been chuckling in recent weeks. (...) This is only his second venture into "straight" comedy, and a climax in the career of the former jockey, who has long been such a favourite as a star of pantomime, variety, films and revue."

In his biography of George Formby, David Bret (2002) recorded that, away from northern venues, "the critics—and the public—were simply not interested in witnessing the exploits of a boring family of Northerners whose only pleasure in life appeared to be spending a rowdy week in Blackpool, engaged in a full-scale battle with a battleaxe landlady. Blackpool theatregoers, on the other hand, had loved the play, and every house had been a sell-out. (...) [George] therefore told the producer, Maxwell Wray, that the production would more than recuperate its losses if he allowed him to add a few more songs and return with it to the Blackpool Grand, or even the Opera House, but Wray would not hear of this, and George lost his temper, vowing never to appear in another stage play."

== Other productions (1950s) ==
On 15 November 1954, Beside the Seaside was performed for one week at the Connaught Theatre, Worthing, produced by Jack Williams and starring John Merivale as Wilf Pearson, Hazel Bainbridge as Ethel Pearson, Vanda Godsell as their daughter Sally, Peggy Mount as Mrs Austin, Richard Coleman as Mr Pepper, Jill Dixon as Mrs Pepper, Anne Bishop as Florrie, Mercy Haystead as Pat Marlow, and Lawrence Davidson as Tony Brett.

On 30 May 1955, it was performed for one week by two separate companies simultaneously: by The Arthur Brough Players at the Leas Pavilion, Folkestone, and by The Saxon Players at the Theatre Royal, Leicester.

The Court Players performed it for a week at the Prince's Theatre, Bradford, on 14 June 1955, featuring Michael Hall as Wilf Pearson, Jill Forest as Ethel Pearson, Mary Brophy as Sally, Sylvia Melville as Mrs. Austin, Jean Kitson as Mrs. Pepper, Jimmie Gill as Mr. Pepper, Janet Whiteside as Florrie, Robina King as Pat Marlow, and Martin Carrol as Tony Brett.

Three weeks later, it was produced by Derek Salberg at the Alexandra Theatre, Birmingham, where it opened on 4 July 1955, and ran for a fortnight, closing on Saturday 16 July after 16 performances. Sands himself played the role of Wilf Pearson, (Note: At the time, Leslie Sands was an actor with Salberg's repertory company at the Alexandra, which he had joined soon after the opening of the 1949 repertory season. He and his wife Pauline Williams—who was also a member of the company—left it in 1957, after she was overlooked for a role they both felt she deserved to play. Nonetheless, the couple remained on friendly terms with Salberg, who would go on to promote the 1958 national tour of Beside the Seaside.) and his real life wife, Pauline Williams, was his stage wife Ethel Pearson. The rest of the cast included: Erica Yorke as Sally, Eileen Draycott as Mrs. Austin, Julia Lang as Florrie, Jeannette Hutchinson as Mrs. Pepper, Robert Chetwyn as Mr. Pepper, and Ward Williams as Tony Brett.

The following week, Anthony Finigan directed the Royalty Players company at the Royalty Theatre, Morecambe, where it opened on 18 July and ran for 6 days, closing on Saturday 23 July after 7 performances. The cast featured Tim Hudson and Mary Steele as Mr. and Mrs. Pearson, Fiona Dorning as Sally, Patsy Byrne as Mrs. Austin, Josephine Tewson as Mrs. Pepper, Graham Armitage as Mr. Pepper, Oriel Taylor as Florrie, Caroline Ryland as Pat Marlow, and Alan Leigh as Tony Brett.

On 10 October 1955, it was produced by Steven Scott for a week at the Intimate Theatre, High Wycombe, with Rosemary Rogers and Harry Gwyn Davies in the leads, and Bob Grant as Tony Brett.

On 2 August 1959, the play was broadcast on the BBC's Sunday-Night Theatre television programme as an episode in the Brian Rix Presents series, starring Leo Franklyn as Wilf Pearson, Sheila Mercier as Ethel Pearson, Merylin Roberts as Sally, Marjorie Rhodes as Mrs. Austin, Joan Sims as Mrs. Pepper, Rix as Mr. Pepper, Edna Hopcroft as Florrie, Christine Russell as Pat Marlow, and Peter Mercier as Tony Brett.
