= Tommy Fields =

British actor, variety entertainer and music hall performer (1908–1988)

Tommy Fields

Tommy Fields (28 June 1908 – 3 June 1988) was a British actor, variety entertainer and music hall performer. He was the younger brother of Gracie Fields.

== Early life ==
Fields was born Tom Stansfield, the youngest of four children and only son of Frederick Stansfield (1874–1956) and his wife Sarah Jane 'Jenny' Stansfield née Bamford (1879–1953), in Rochdale, Lancashire. His great-grandfather, William Stansfield (b.1805), of Hebden Bridge, Yorkshire, was a descendant of the Stansfield family of Stansfield, Yorkshire. As a boy Field enjoyed being with his father on his allotment where Fred Stansfield operated as an illegal bookmaker and 'rat worried'.

== Stage career ==
While his older sisters, including Gracie were on tour with their manager Archie Pitt (also the husband of Gracie Fields), Tommy Field remained at home with his parents until it was time for him to join his sisters in their act on stage. His own wish was to join the Royal Navy, but he was overruled by his mother, and he made his first stage appearance in 1921 at Oldham. In 1924 he joined his sisters' review act Mr Tower of London, initially selling postcards of his sisters for a penny during the interval, and in time joining them on stage. In the revue Mr Tower of London he garnered good reviews as the ticket conductor in the 'Mr Tower’s Omnibus' scene.

In 1926 Tommy Fields joined his sisters Gracie and Edith as the principal comedian in Archie Pitt's new revue By Request, and when they were joined by accordionist Nino Rossini (1901–1965), he and Tommy Fields decided to form a new double act, Fields and Rossini, with Tommy Fields playing the violin and performing eccentric dancing and Rossini playing his accordion and performing comedy. During 1928 and 1935 Fields and Rossini toured South Africa with Gracie Fields before joining Archie Pitt's new revue, The Show’s the Thing, in which he sang three solos, "I Wish She'd Come Along Now", "Connie in the Cornfield", and "I Ain't Certain".

Throughout the 1930s Fields and Rossini met with success, playing at various venues, including the London Palladium on the same bill as Gracie Fields. They played at other variety theatres including the London Coliseum, the Hackney Empire and the Holborn Empire. In December 1937 the duo appeared in the pantomime Jack and the Beanstalk at the Empress Theatre in Brixton in which Fields played Dame Trot. The double act separated at the end of 1938 when Fields decided to pursue a solo stage career. In 1939 he recorded two songs with his sister Gracie, "Two Sleepy People" and "The Umbrella Man", and in 1948 "Papa, Won't You Dance With Me?". He later recalled, "We only recorded a few songs together. They weren’t very good, but I treasure them." The two also performed together on the soundtrack version of "Love Is Everywhere" (written by Harry Parr-Davies), from the 1935 film Look Up and Laugh.

Fields on a poster for the Opera House Theatre in Blackpool in the 1960s

He continued to appear on variety bills throughout the 1960s, including appearing at the Opera House Theatre in Blackpool on a bill that included Cliff Richard and Richard Hearne. In addition, he appeared in musicals, including in a revival of Mr Tower of London (1949) and Where's Charley? in 1950, a musical version of Charley’s Aunt. He continued to perform with his sister Gracie Fields, the last time in 1957 in Hughie Green's Saturday Spectacular. In 1962 he played the pantomime dame Widow Twanky in Aladdin at the Pavilion Theatre in Bournemouth opposite Adam Faith in the title role.

== Film and television ==
His film and television roles included: Sidney Pearson in Look up and Laugh (1935); Tommy Barcroft in The Penny Pool (1937); Member of the Three Bolas in Keep Smiling (1938); Jack Hylton's Monday Show (1958); Gracie Fields: Sing As We Go (1984)

== Personal life ==
He was married three times: to dancer Cynthia Rawson in 1947, with whom he had two daughters, Melanie Stansfield (1951–) and Isla Stansfield (1953–); to dancer Dorothy Whiteside in 1930, with whom he had a son, Michael Frederick John Stansfield (1934–2008), and Annette Thornton in 1967, with whom he had a daughter, Marisa Stansfield (1968–). He died in Lewes in Sussex in June 1988 and was buried in the churchyard of St Laurence's Church at Telscombe Village in Sussex.
