= The Penny Pool =

1937 film

- Directed by: George Black
- Written by: Arthur Mertz; Ronald Gow
- Produced by: John E. Blakeley
- Starring: Douglas Wakefield; Billy Nelson; Chuck O'Neil
- Cinematography: Germain Burger
- Production company: Mancunian Films
- Distributed by: Mancunian Films
- Release date: 1937
- Running time: 85 minutes
- Country: United Kingdom
- Language: English

The Penny Pool is a 1937 British comedy film directed by George Black and starring Douglas Wakefield, Billy Nelson and Chuck O'Neil. It was made at Highbury Studios.

== Cast ==
- Douglas Wakefield as Duggie
- Billy Nelson as Billy
- Chuck O'Neil as Chuck
- Jack Butler as Jack
- Louanne Shaw as Renee Harland
- Tommy Fields as Tommy Bancroft
- Rex Alderman
- Elsie Brown as Elsie
- Gabrielle Brune
- Howard Douglas
- Jennie Gregson
- Langley Howard
- Jack Lewis Singing Scholars as Variety Act
- Macari as And His Dutch Serenaders
- Marie Louise Sisters as Variety Act
- Mascotte as Specialty Act
- Helen Morant
- Charles Sewell as Henry Bancroft
- Fred Stilton as Tenor
- Harry Terry as Jerry Rogers

== Bibliography ==
- Low, Rachael. Filmmaking in 1930s Britain. George Allen & Unwin, 1985.
- Wood, Linda. British Films, 1927-1939. British Film Institute, 1986.
