= Douglas Wakefield =

British actor (1899–1951)

- Born: 28 August 1899; Hull, Yorkshire, England
- Died: 14 April 1951 (aged 51); London, England
- Occupation: Actor
- Years active: 1933-1940 (film)

Douglas Wakefield (actual first name was Albine but changed to Duggie for stage) (28 August 1899 – 14 April 1951) was a British music hall performer and film actor. He is often credited as Duggie Wakefield. He appeared in two films with sister-in-law Gracie Fields, playing her brother in the 1933 comedy This Week of Grace. In 1940 he starred in an espionage comedy-thriller, Spy for a Day.

== Selected filmography ==
- This Week of Grace (1933)
- Look Up and Laugh (1955)
- The Penny Pool (1937)
- Calling All Crooks (1938)
- Spy for a Day (1940)

== Bibliography ==
- Murphy, Robert. British Cinema and the Second World War. A&C Black, 2005.
