= Spy for a Day =

- Directed by: Mario Zampi
- Written by: Story: Stacy Aumonier; Screenplay: Ralph Block, Emeric Pressburger, Hans Wilhelm, Anatole de Grunwald
- Produced by: Mario Zampi
- Starring: Douglas Wakefield, Paddy Browne, Jack Allen
- Cinematography: Bernard Knowles
- Edited by: David Lean
- Music by: Nicholas Brodszky
- Production company: Two Cities Films
- Distributed by: Paramount British Pictures
- Release date: 27 April 1940 (UK)
- Running time: 71 minutes
- Country: United Kingdom
- Language: English

Spy for a Day is a 1940 British comedy thriller film directed by Mario Zampi and starring Douglas Wakefield, Paddy Browne and Jack Allen. The screenplay concerns a British farmer who is abducted by the Germans during World War I.

== Premise ==
During World War I, a British farmer is abducted by the Germans to take the place of a spy about to be executed whom he closely resembles.

== Cast ==
- Douglas Wakefield as Sam Gates
- Paddy Browne as Martha Clowes
- Jack Allen as Captain Bradshaw
- Albert Lieven as Captain Hausemann
- Nicholas Hannen as Colonel Pemberton
- Gibb McLaughlin as Colonel Ludwig
- Allan Jeayes as Colonel Roberts
- Alf Goddard as Sergeant Bryan
- George Hayes as Corporal Boehme
- Eliot Makeham as Trufit
- Hay Petrie as Britt
- O. B. Clarence as Medical Officer
