= Kate Carney =

English singer (1869–1950)

- Born: Catherine Mary Pattinson; 15 August 1869; Southwark, London, England
- Died: 1 January 1950 (aged 80); Wandsworth, London
- Resting place: Putney Vale Cemetery (Plot D5 no 47)
- Occupations: Singer, comedian, theatre operator
- Spouse(s): George Shea (aka Barclay, 1868–1944)
- Children: George (b. 1887); Richard (b. 1889); William (1891–1915); Harry (b. 1893); Kate (b. 1899)
- Relatives: Gladys Mavius

Kate Carney (born Catherine Mary Pattinson; 15 August 1869 – 1 January 1950) was an English singer and comedienne who played the music halls in London.

== Biography ==
She was born in the London district of Southwark. Her father worked in a double act, the Brothers Raynard, and her mother also performed on stage. Kate began singing on stage as Kate Patterson; in 1886, she married George Shea, who assumed the stage name Barclay and performed in a double act, "Barclay and Perkins, the Brewers of Mirth".

After a break when her first two sons were born, she reappeared in 1890 under the name Kate Carney at the Albert Music Hall in Canning Town, singing Irish ballads such as "Here's My Love to Old Ireland". She soon became popular, and gradually replaced the Irish songs in her act with Cockney songs, including "Three Pots a Shilling" and "Sarah, Sarah (A Donkey Cart Built for Two)". She became known as "The Cockney Queen", "The Coster Queen", or "The Coster Comedienne". Writer Roy Busby described her as "..a buxom woman, dressed in a coster dress of pearly and a large hat trimmed with enormous ostrich plumes... Her songs combined a ripe humour with the pathos of East London life...". Among her most successful songs were "Has Anyone Seen My Yiddisher Boy?", "When the Summer Comes Again", "Three Pots a Shilling", and "Are We to Part Like This, Bill?", written by Harry Castling and Charles Collins. Carney performed at the Empress Theatre in Brixton on its opening night in December 1898. She appeared in her first Royal Variety Performance in 1912.

Her husband stopped performing to act as her agent – later also managing Ted Ray, among others – and she became one of the most successful music hall performers. She established her own company of dancers to support her own stage act, and acquired enough wealth to buy a large house in Brixton as well as racehorses and expensive cars.

After the First World War, she restricted her appearances, re-emerging in the early 1930s when she performed with a butler accompanying her on piano, as well as her own chorus and musicians. She appeared in the 1935 and 1938 Royal Variety Performances. During the Second World War, she became known for ignoring air raid warnings and inviting audience members to join her on stage. After the death of her husband in 1944, she became the lessee of Grand Theatre, Clapham Junction in her own right.

Carney also appeared on BBC radio, and continued to perform until her last broadcast in 1949. Upon her eightieth birthday on August 15, she received "best wishes" from Queen Mary that "the coming years may bring many happy days". Carney died four-and-a-half months later, on New Year's Day, 1950. She had five children with her husband George Shea and is buried alongside her husband, and a son who pre-deceased her, in Putney Vale Cemetery. She was also the mother-in-law of Canadian dancer Gladys Mavius.

== Songs ==
- Are We to Part Like This, Bill
- Three Pots a Shilling
- Sarah
- A Donkey Cart Built for Two
- Here's To An English Tar
- Mother, I Love You
- Stand Up For The Rose
- There's A Nice Little Home A-Waiting

== Sources ==
- Gammond, Peter (1991). Oxford Companion to Popular Music. ISBN 0-19-311323-6.
- Barker, Anthony. Music Hall magazine, issue MH44.
- Kilgarriff, Michael (1999). Grace, Beauty & Banjos.
