= George Black (producer) =

British theatre impresario (1890-1945)

- Born: 20 April 1890; Small Heath, Birmingham, Warwickshire, England
- Died: 14 March 1945 (aged 54); London, England
- Occupations: Producer; impresario; theatre manager
- Years active: 1912–1945
- Children: Alfred, George Jr.

George Black (20 April 1890 – 4 March 1945) was a British theatrical impresario who controlled many entertainment venues during the 1930s and 1940s and was a pioneer of the motion picture business.

== Biography ==
=== Early years ===
Black was born on 20 April 1890, at 3 Court, 7 Sutton Street, in Small Heath, Birmingham. He left school at the age of eleven to work for his father who had previously been a travelling showman and now worked in the film industry. Aged twelve, he was looking after his father's Flea Circus. Black served throughout the Great War as a private in the Northumberland Fusiliers and rose to the rank of Lance-Corporal. After the war, Black helped his father establish the first permanent motion-picture theatres in the UK. Black was a grafter and learnt about the entertainment business from his father. One of Black's initial jobs in his father's cinema was to show films on a Paul's Theatrograph, which was the name of the first commercially produced 35mm film projector. Within a few years, Black had become proprietor of a circuit of theatres and music halls on the North East coast of Britain.

=== Managing Director of the London Palladium ===
In 1928, Black moved to London and took over the management of GTC (General Theatre Corporation), which ran a chain of theatres, cinemas and dance halls. He also took over the management of the London Palladium, which was the flagship of the corporation. The Hippodrome, London in Leicester Square, Brighton Hippodrome and Blackpool Opera House were also under his control. When Black arrived as managing director of the London Palladium he'd previously owned a string of thirteen cinema theatres, which he'd sold for £300,000. Although the Palladium had recently fallen on hard times due to falling ticket sales (the theatre had lain dark during autumn of that year), Black's vision was to revive the Palladium as the number one variety theatre in the UK. On 3 September 1928, he re-opened the theatre with a superb variety bill that included Gracie Fields, Dick Henderson, Billy Bennett and Ivor Novello and a full supporting cast. Ticket sales skyrocketed and Argyll Street outside the Palladium's entrance became congested with a mass of unlucky patrons who'd been turned away at the box office. By headlining top-notch homegrown stars on the bill, Black secured continuous success through the remainder of the '20s and throughout the '30s. In defence of his entertainment policy Black was quoted as saying, 'Variety is an integral part of English life, the finest expression of the English character and as necessary to our social life as food and drink.' From October 1928 until 1931, Black allowed live broadcasts over the radio to be transmitted from the London Palladium, which proved extremely popular with radio audiences. Black even looked abroad for acts, bringing many of the top American stars to the UK to perform at the Palladium including Duke Ellington and his Orchestra, Adelaide Hall, Cab Calloway, Fats Waller, Vic Oliver and Ethel Waters. In 1937, Black brought Josephine Baker over to the UK direct from the Folies-Bergere in Paris to headline a British tour on the Moss Empires circuit, which culminated on 27 June 1938 with her appearance at the London Palladium, her first engagement there. Film stars were also booked onto the bill including the juvenile actor Jackie Coogan (who'd appeared alongside Charlie Chaplin in the hit film The Kid). Coogan proved so popular he was held over for an extra week.

In 1928, Black took over the presentation of the Royal Variety Performance. That year it was staged on 1 March at the London Coliseum in the presence of King George V and Queen Mary. After a gap of one year, on 22 May 1930, Black presented the Royal Variety Performance at the London Palladium, again in the presence of King George V and Queen Mary. The show was broadcast live by BBC Radio. Black went on to present and compere at the Royal Variety Performance each year (excluding 1936) thereafter up to 1938 after which the performance was halted for the duration of the Second World War.

Pantomime became a regular feature at the London Palladium for many years, and the Christmas pantomime Peter Pan was so popular with audiences that Black made it a fixture at the theatre every year from 1930 to 1938.

In the early 1930s, Black, along with his assistant Charles Henry, decided to experiment with the content of the shows they produced at the Palladium. They came up with the novel idea of pairing together comedy double-acts. On 30 November 1931, Black organised Crazy Week at the Palladium, which brought together various comedy acts. It was under Black's watchful eye that this format was developed into the act that became known collectively as the Crazy Gang consisting of Nervo and Knox, Naughton and Gold and Flanagan and Allen. Black devised and produced the shows and revues that starred the Crazy Gang at the Palladium. Many theatre programmes of the 1930s had the words "Produced by George Black" on their cover. The Crazy Gang dominated the Palladium scene until the war years; then subsequently at the Victoria Palace Theatre. The average season attendance at one of the Crazy Gang shows was between 500,000 and 600,000 paying customers. By 1937, Black had signed the Crazy Gang up for a film and stage contract worth £100,000. Black's 1937 production with the Crazy Gang titled London Rhapsody received plaudits from the press. It was considered to be one of the most spectacular shows ever produced at the Palladium. A contemporary critic noted, "whereas Ivor Novello has put Drury Lane back on the map by altering the standard of production there to a point far removed from the theatre's traditions, George Black has achieved the same results at the Palladium by a different process. The London Palladium reviews have been going one better every time. London Rhapsody is the best yet." In 1938 Black co-wrote and staged another Crazy Gang show These Foolish Things, which also featured the Sherman Fisher Girls.

On 5 May 1940, Black presented A Grand Variety Gala from the London Palladium that was broadcast on the BBC Radio Forces Programme in aid of the Variety Artists' Benevolent Fund. In August 1940, Black's musical revue Apple Sauce opened at the Holborn Empire starring Max Miller and Vera Lynn. After the theatre was bombed in 1941, the show transferred to the London Palladium where it ran until November 1941.

In her book The Time of My Life, musical star Pat Kirkwood recounts her time appearing at the London Palladium in Top of the World during the air raids of 1940. She had just opened in the new show:

"We had raids every night and we never knew who would be on stage when they dropped. Tommy Trinder had a side-bet arranged, based on which of the comics would be on when one dropped. It was always Tommy! I had my turn too: one night in the middle of singing ‘Rhumboogie’ a bomb fell so near to the theatre that all the stalls heavy double-plated doors burst open and the whole auditorium shook. Everyone onstage carried on regardless and the audience never moved. This happened on the Saturday night of our first week at the Palladium. On Sunday morning I had a telephone call from Charles Henry, George Black's second in command, to inform me that the show was closing and that all theatres would be shut down until further notice. What we were not told was that on the Saturday night a landmine had landed on the roof of the Palladium and become lodged in the chimney. The bomb disposal men had defused it then carried it out through the stage door on Sunday morning!"

By late autumn of 1940 the German bombing blitz was well under way and more producers and stars packed their trunks and headed out of London. Some moved to Northern England, (Blackpool especially), for the duration of the war. Jack Hylton and George Black were just two impresarios who ran their showbiz empires from Blackpool. The Tower Company who owned Blackpool Tower and its ballroom benefited greatly from this arrangement as their premises were used for shows in rehearsal and for the launch of national tours. Black was president of the VAA (Variety Artists Association) and during the war staged several shows that financially benefited American, British and Allied charities; one such show being Irving Berlin's This Is The Army. On 7 July 1944, Black's forthcoming production Happy and Glorious, set to open at the London Palladium starring Tommy Trinder, Zoe Gail and Elisabeth Welch, was previewed at the Proms as part of Sir Henry Wood's Jubilee Season of Promenade Concerts and broadcast over the radio on the BBC Home Service.

=== Managing Director of Moss Empires ===
Black oversaw the merging of GTC with Moss Empires variety circuit in 1932. He was then in charge of the new company Moss Empires Group and was in control of a chain of 53 theatres all over the UK. In 1938, he became the joint managing director of Moss Empires. As manager of the London Palladium and controlling boss of Moss Empires, Black became one of London's most powerful producers. When the chairman Colonel J. J. Gillespie of Moss Empires died in January 1942, Mr. R. H. Gillespie became chairman and George Black was promoted to sole managing director.

== Family ==
George Black Sr. was born in Newcastle upon Tyne in 1857. By 1861 the family had moved to live in nearby Sunderland. Black Sr. worked for many years at the Comedy Theatre in Manchester (later named the Gaiety Theatre) and at Theatre Royal, Birmingham. In time, he bought a huge waxworks exhibition, which he toured the UK with. In May 1906, Black Sr. opened the Monkwearmouth Picture Hall in Bonnersfield, Sunderland, in a building that had formerly been St Stephen's Presbyterian Chapel. The building had ceased to be a church since 1903. It was in this building he would store and sometimes exhibit his waxworks exhibition when it wasn't on tour. Black Sr. along with his three sons (Gerorge, Alfred and Edward) ran the cinema as the British Animated Picture Company and claimed it was the first permanent cinema north of Birmingham. There is evidence to suggest that moving pictures were put on as early as 1904, as an added attraction to the waxworks. The paying customers sat in the old chapel pews in front of a white sheet, which was used as the screen and was tied to the lectern. Black Sr. employed his three sons to work at the cinema: his son George operated the hand-cranked kinematograph, Alfred ran the box-office and Edward wrote the prologues for the silent films. The first film shown was a newsreel called The Launching of the Mauretania, (which was released on 20 September 1906). As early as 1907, Black Sr. anticipated the Cinematograph Act 1909, (which came into operation on 1 January 1910), and separated the projector from the audience. They also ran 'twice nightly' shows. The Black family made a considerable amount of money when in 1914 Black Sr. purchased the local areas screening rights to show the film Tillie's Punctured Romance starring Charlie Chaplin, Marie Dressler and Mabel Normand.

In 1909, Black Sr. opened the New Picture Palace in Gateshead. He also became sole proprietor of the Palace Theatre, West Hartlepool, the Blyth Theatre Royal and the Borough Theatre in North Shields and the lessee of the Picture Hall, West Hartlepool and the Tivoli, Laygate Circus in South Shields. Black Sr. was known amongst the community to be a charitable man and distributed food and shoes among the poor children of Sunderland.

After George Black Sr.'s death in 1910, the Black brothers controlled a chain of twelve cinemas. In 1916, their original cinema (the Monkwearmouth Picture Hall in Bonnersfield, Sunderland) was renamed the Bridge Cinema. George Black claimed that he and his father experimented with the idea of 'talkies' before 'talkies' arrived: 'We collected a couple of old women and old men who saw the film through once, chose what parts they wanted to play, stood behind the screen on the first night of its performance and made up the dialogue as they went along.'

When George Black (b.1891) broke his ties with the local entertainment scene by moving to London in 1928, his brothers Alfred and Edward continued with the family business and opened their most luxurious cinema, the Regal in 1932. In 1936, Edward gave up his interest in the family business and turned his hand to film producing and worked for Gainsborough Films, Gaumont British, London Films, Twentieth Century Fox and the Rank Organisation. Eventually, many of the Blacks' cinemas, including the later-built Regal Cinemas and Essoldo Cinemas, were sold to other companies.

George Black died in London in 1945. Acknowledging the service he'd given to the entertainment industry, on 12 April 1945, the BBC aired the radio programme George Black Memories. After his death his two sons George Jr. and Alfred took over the family's flourishing entertainment empire.

George Black (b. 1891) had two sons, Alfred (b. 1913 d. 2002) and George Jr. (b. 1911 d. 1970) who both entered show business and followed in their father's footsteps as successful producers and impresarios. Together they founded Black Brothers TV Ltd. It was George Jr. who gave Nicholas Parsons his first big break in television. In 1956, Independent Television began. George Jr. and Alfred were keen to muscle in on this new medium and decided to produce a new series together based upon their father's wartime show Strike A New Note and stated in their press handout, ‘to discover the new and unknown stars of Independent Television’. The first show was transmitted in January 1956 and the comedian Arthur Haynes appeared on it. Nicholas Parsons appeared on the third show. The show received a bit of a panning so after the sixth show, George Jr. said to Parsons, "I'm getting rid of everybody but I'm going to keep Arthur Haynes and you. I think the two of you should do sketches together". George Jr. changed the title of the show to Get Happy and the show continued for another eighteen weeks until George Jr. thought he'd exhausted it all. George Jr. and Alfred also produced several West End musicals together including the 1954 production Wedding in Paris at the London Hippodrome.

During the Second World War, Captain George Black Jr. along with Colonel Basil Brown and Major Bill Alexander formed the organisation Stars in Battledress (SIB) that entertained the troops.

Alfred Black married the actress and leading West End musical star Roma Beaumont (b. 1913 d. 2001). Roma starred in several hit musicals including The Dancing Years, Perchance to Dream and in Cinderella at the London Palladium in 1948. Alfred and Roma's daughter is the actress Susan Beaumont who appeared in many films throughout the 1950s. Roma Beumont's cousin was the dancer/singer Roma King (b. 1934 d. 2013) who appeared in several West End musicals including Love from Judy (1952–54), Lilac Time and Summer Song (1954). In January 1959, George Jr. and Alfred (with the film producer Sidney Box) founded the independent TV Station Tyne Tees Television that served North East England.

The English writer, composer, musician and comedian Bill Oddie's wife, the writer Laura Beaumont, is related to Roma Beaumont.

On 6 May 1975, BBC Radio 2 broadcast an episode of the radio series The Impresarios, devoted to the work of George Black. Narrated by Michael Craig, the series documented the stories of the men who created the world of entertainment. During this episode, George's son Alfred states: "The London Palladium was a dead duck, they'd tried everything there – circuses, films, plays. It was going through a terribly bad patch and they said to my Dad, 'That's yours, what are you going to do with it?' Dad said, 'I'll make it the number one Variety theatre of the world." The programme contains interviews with Tommy Trinder, Roma Beaumont, Alfred Black, Pauline Black and Alec Shanks.

== Credits ==
=== Crazy Gang shows ===
- Crazy Week – London Palladium – opened 30 November 1931
- Crazy Week (second edition) – London Palladium – opened 21 December 1931
- We Go Crazy – London Palladium – opened 6 June 1932
- Loose Nuts – London Palladium – opened 1932
- Gingerella – London Palladium – opened during the summer of 1932
- The Third Crazy Month – London Palladium – opened November 1932
- The Fourth Crazy Month – London Palladium – opened 6 March 1933
- New Edition of the 5th Crazy Month – London Palladium – opened 9 October 1933
- March Hares – London Palladium
- Crazy Show (sixth edition) – London Palladium – opened 21 May 1934
- Crazy Show (seventh edition) – London Palladium – opened 22 October 1934
- Life Begins at Oxford Circus – (first edition) – London Palladium – January 1935
- Life Begins at Oxford Circus (second edition) – London Palladium – opened 20 May 1935
- Round About Regent Street – London Palladium – opened 26 August 1935
- All Alight at Oxford Circus – London Palladium – opened 11 March 1936
- O-Kay For Sound – London Palladium – opened 14 September 1936
- London Rhapsody – London Palladium – opened 11 October 1937
- These Foolish Things – London Palladium – opened 3 October 1938
- The Little Dog Laughed – London Palladium – 13 September 1939
- Top of the World – London Palladium – 4 September 1940

=== Other Palladium shows ===
- Peter Pan – Christmas pantomime produced annually from 1930 -1939
- London Symphony (1938) – with costumes designed by Erté
- Gangway (1942) – a musical revue (ran from 17 December 1941 to 24 October 1942)
- Best Bib and Tucker (1942) – a musical revue
- This Is The Army (1943) – an Irving Berlin show with flu G.I. cast
- Happy and Glorious (1944) – a musical fanfare

=== London shows ===
- The Fleet's Lit Up (1938) – Hippodrome, London
- George Black's Intimate Rag: Black Velvet (1939) – Hippodrome, London
- Black Velvet (1938/39) (starring Roma Beaumont) – Hippodrome, London
- Haw Haw! – George Black's Laughter Show (1939–1940) – Holborn Empire (formerly known as Weston's Music Hall, London
- Apple Sauce (1940) – opened at the Holborn Empire on 27 August 1940. After the theatre was bombed the show transferred to the London Palladium and ran from 5 March 1941 to 29 November 1941
- Get a Load of This (1941) – Hippodrome, London The production transferred to London's Prince of Wales Theatre in November 1942
- The Lisbon Story (1943) – Hippodrome, London
- Strike a New Note (1943) – Prince of Wales Theatre, London
- Jenny Jones (1944) – Hippodrome, London
- Strike it Again (1945) – Prince of Wales Theatre, London

=== Other shows ===
- Simple Simon (1934) – Christmas Pantomime at Glasgow Empire Theatre
- Josser's Detective Agency (1935) – A musical revue starring Ernest Lotinga (regional tour)
- Jack and the Beanstalk (1935) – Christmas Pantomime at the Palace Theatre, Manchester
- Mother Goose (1935) – Christmas Pantomime at the Liverpool Empire Theatre
- Cinderella (1935) – Christmas Pantomime at The Empire Theatre, Newcastle
- Red Riding Hood (1935) – Christmas Pantomime at the Theatre Royal, Leeds
- Mother Goose (1935) – Christmas Pantomime at The Prince's Theatre, Manchester
- Twinkle (1936) – A holiday summer show
- Will C. Pepper's' White Coons (1936) – A Concert Party show
- Radio Pie (1936) – Radio Show
- Cinderella (1936) – Christmas Pantomime at Edinburgh's Empire Theatre
- Holiday Fare (1937) – Variety show at Boscombe Hippodrome, Bournemouth
- The Gang Show (1938) – The cast included 150 Boy Scouts from Newcastle and district at the Empire Theatre, Newcastle
- All The Best (1938) – Blackpool Opera House
- The Silent Melody (1938) – A Musical Play starring Bebe Daniels and Ben Lyon
- George Black presents Debroy Somers and his Band (1940) – Radio show compered by George Black featuring Debroy Somers
- George Black presents a Grand Variety Gala (1940) – Radio show
- It's That Man Again (1940) – Palace Theatre, Manchester
- Hullabaloo (Summer 1941) – Blackpool Opera House
- Black Vanities (1941) – Brighton Hippodrome from 11 April 1941 before transferring to the Victoria Palace Theatre from 24 April 1941 to 17 January 1942
- Black and Blue (1941) – Blackpool Opera House
- Black Vanities (1942) – Blackpool Opera House
- Youth Must Have Its Swing (1943) – Regional tour
- If It's Laughter You're After (1944) – Birmingham Hippodrome

=== Filmography ===
- Just My Luck (1933) – assistant director
- The Penny Pool (1937) – Director
- Calling All Crooks (1938) – Director
