= Calling All Crooks =

1938 British film by George Black

- Directed by: George Black
- Written by: Arthur Mertz
- Produced by: John E. Blakeley
- Starring: Douglas Wakefield; Billy Nelson; Leslie Perrins
- Cinematography: Desmond Dickinson
- Production company: Mancunian Film
- Distributed by: Mancunian Film
- Release date: October 1938
- Running time: 85 minutes
- Country: United Kingdom
- Language: English

Calling All Crooks is a 1938 British comedy film directed by George Black and starring Douglas Wakefield, Billy Nelson and Leslie Perrins. It was made by the Manchester-based Mancunian Film, but shot at Cricklewood Studios in London.

== Cast ==
- Douglas Wakefield as Duggie
- Billy Nelson as Billy
- Leslie Perrins as Duvane
- Helen Barnes as Joan Bellamy
- Chuck O'Neil as Chuck
- Jack Butler as Jack
- Dan Young as Dan

== Bibliography ==
- Low, Rachael. Filmmaking in 1930s Britain. George Allen & Unwin, 1985.
- Wood, Linda. British Films, 1927-1939. British Film Institute, 1986.
