= Empress Theatre (Brixton) =

UK theater (1898–1992)

Coordinates: 51.4621°N 0.1163°W

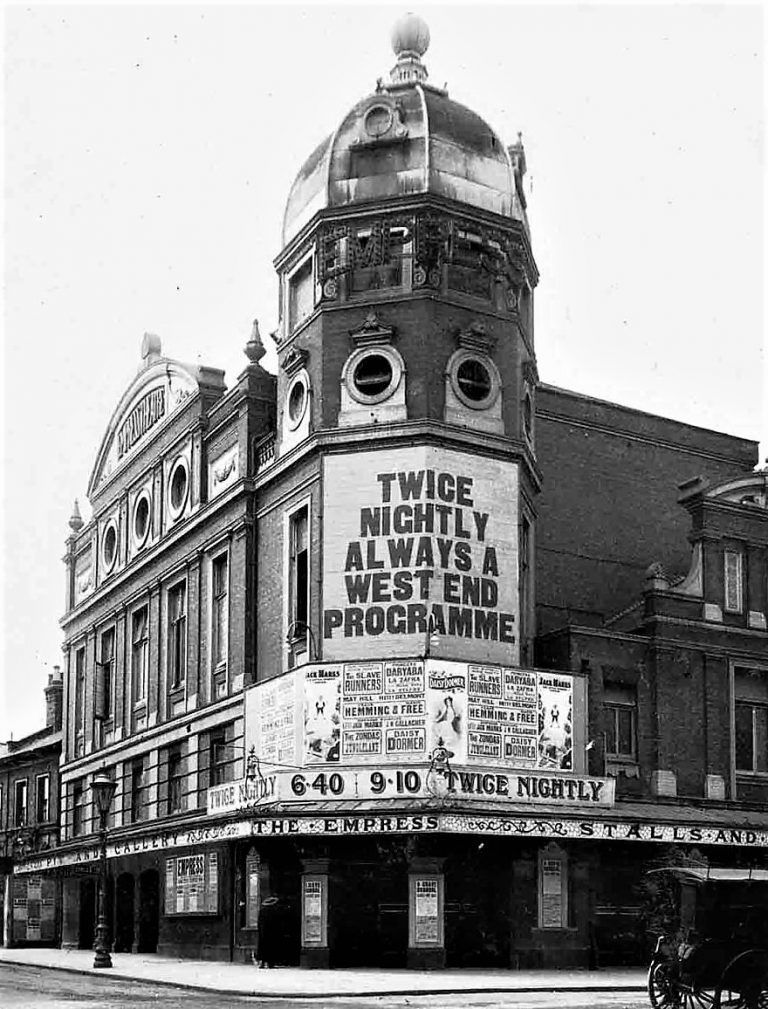
The Empress Theatre in Brixton in 1910

The Empress Theatre (variously later known as: The Empress Theatre of Varieties; Empress Music Hall; and, from 1957, Granada Cinema) was an entertainment venue located on the corner of Bernay's Grove and Brighton Terrace in Brixton, south London from 1898 to 1992 when the building was demolished and the site redeveloped for housing.

The Empress Theatre was built for Messrs W. H. Burney and W. J. Grimes and was designed by Wylson & Long and built by the contractor T. L. Green. The Empress could seat 1,260 on three levels, stalls and pit, Dress Circle and Gallery, and had a large stage 60 foot wide by 40 deep with a proscenium opening 30 foot wide. The electric lighting and heating was installed by Messrs Strode and Co.. The box-office hall was decorated with marble mosaic by Messrs Diespeker and Co., and was fitted with Japanese leather decorations. The auditorium, decorated in the French Renaissance style, was fitted with 'chaste embellishments' of nine panels 'each ornamented by a heraldic dive of griffins.. clawing a shield in delicate pink' measured 75 foot by 64 foot in the clear over which was a "lofty saucer-shaped dome". Over the proscenium, on each top corner, were positioned reclining female figures of Euterpe and Terpsichore, while over the two boxes, placed on each side of the proscenium on the dress circle level, were paintings, again in the French Renaissance style. The Empress opened on Boxing Day 1898 with a variety show. The Music and Theatre Review of 30 December 1898 recorded that on the theatre's opening night hundreds of patrons were turned away. On the 'bill' that night were Brixton's Kate Carney as well as a display of the Thomas Edison moving pictures. The singer and comedian Arthur Lloyd appeared here in 1900, 1901 and 1902. Other performers to appear at the Empress at this time included Joe Elvin, Vera Lynn, Tommy Fields, Wilson, Keppel and Betty, Marie Lloyd and Harry Lauder.

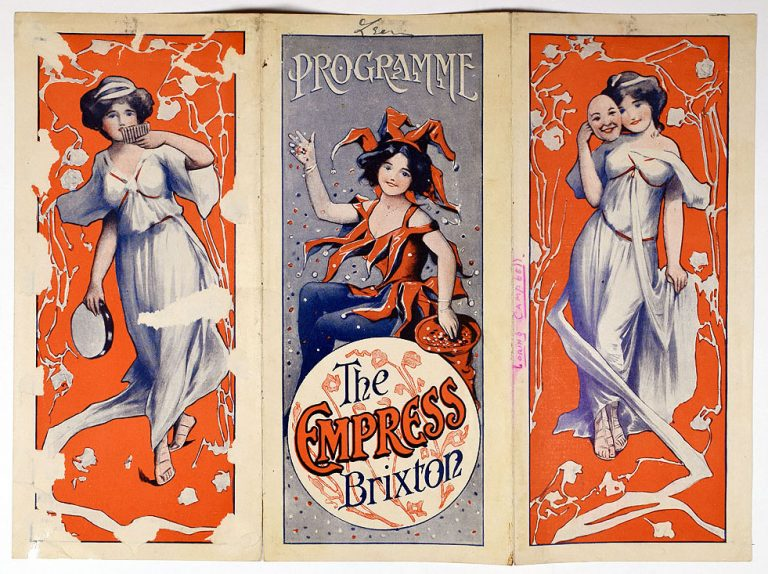
Theatre programme from 1915

During the 1950s and 1960s various well-known performers appeared at the Empress, including Tony Hancock, Dorothy Squires, Alma Cogan, Joe Brown, Shirley Abicair, Hughie Green, Charlie Chester, Max Miller, Stan Laurel and Oliver Hardy and Bruce Forsyth.

The Empress Theatre was variously known as the Empress Theatre of Varieties and the Empress Music Hall. In 1930 it was taken over by Variety Theatre Consolidated as a variety theatre and the auditorium was remodelled in the Art Deco Style to seat 2,000. It was the Granada Cinema from 1957 until the 1970s when it was repurposed as a bingo hall. The Empress eventually became a furniture warehouse before being demolished in 1992. A small housing development now stands on the site.
