= King's Theatre, Hammersmith =

Former theatre in London, England

Coordinates: 51.4934°N 0.2197°W

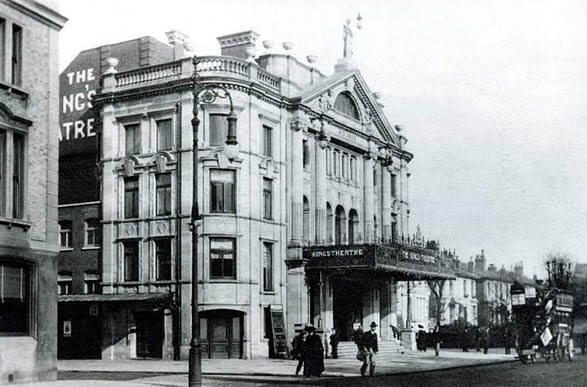

King's Theatre was a live entertainment venue in Hammersmith, West London, on the corner of Hammersmith Road and Rowan Road. It was built in 1902 as a music hall, with a seating capacity of 3,000.

== History ==
The theatre was designed by W. G. R. Sprague for entrepreneur J. B. Mulholland, who also built the New Wimbledon Theatre. The first show was a pantomime, Cinderella, which opened on 26 December 1902.

In 1954 it was refitted by the BBC as a temporary studio while their Television Theatre complex was being upgraded. It also served as a recording studio for radio programmes.

The BBC sold the building in 1959 and it was demolished in 1963.
