= The Fleet's Lit Up =

Musical comedy from 1938

The Fleet's Lit Up is a musical comedy first staged in London in 1938 with music and lyrics by Vivian Ellis and a book by Guy Bolton, Fred Thompson and Bert Lee. It ran for 191 performances at the London Hippodrome from August 1938 to February 1939. The original cast included Stanley Lupino, Frances Day and Adele Dixon. It was produced and directed by George Black. The title refers to the phrase used constantly by BBC commentator Thomas Woodrooffe during a drunken broadcast for the 1937 Spithead Review.

== Bibliography ==
- Wearing, J.P. The London Stage 1930-1939: A Calendar of Productions, Performers, and Personnel. Rowman & Littlefield, 2014.
