= Theatre Royal, Hanley =

Former theatre in Hanley, Stoke-on-Trent, England, now a pub

Coordinates: 53.0250°N 2.1778°W

The Theatre Royal, Hanley was a theatre in Stoke-on-Trent, England with a long history.

== History ==
=== First building ===
The Royal Pottery Theatre opened on 25 November 1852 in Brunswick Street, Hanley, and was initially run by James Rogers. The building was converted from a Chartist meeting hall, and was originally a Methodist chapel. In 1857, this building was gutted and extended to create a larger venue for 1,400, such was the theatre's success.

=== Second building ===
In 1870 the old Royal Pottery Theatre was demolished and the new Theatre Royal and Opera House constructed. Designed by R. Twemlow to a cost of £4,500, it could hold 3,600. The facade of this building can be seen in Brunswick Street today as the entrance to the 'Fiction' nightclub. James Elphinstone took over in 1872, and his family ran the theatre for decades.

=== Third building ===
Elphinstone obtained plans from Charles J. Phipps and Frank Matcham, renowned theatrical architects, and again rebuilt the venue in 1887. A new auditorium was constructed to the south of the old theatre, which was converted into the stage. Entrance for the 2,600 patrons was still from Brunswick Street until a new entrance block was constructed in Pall Mall, still visible today with additional rendering. Further work took place in 1894 by Frank Matcham to extend the auditorium southwards to increase its capacity, and to install electric light.

The theatre mainly featured a mix of drama, opera, and musical comedy until the 1920s when variety became the mainstay. The theatre's 'Hanley Babes', formed from young girls from local dance groups, became synonymous with the annual pantomime.

On 2 June 1949, the stage and auditorium of the venue were destroyed by fire in the early hours during a run of the Sadler's Wells Ballet.

=== Fourth building ===
==== 1951–1961 ====
Work began in 1950 to construct a new theatre in the ruins of the old. Designed by Edward Foresaw and George Greaves. it could hold 1,800 people over three levels. The opening performance was on 14 August 1951, with the national tour of Annie Get Your Gun.

The rise of television meant audiences dwindled, and owners Mecca converted the theatre to bingo in 1961 although local amateur dramatics still hired the venue. In 1966 a casino was opened on the stage, ending this practice.

==== 1981–2000 ====
In 1981 Mecca closed the bingo operation, and a local trust purchased the theatre. Following minor renovation it reopened in December 1982 with the pantomime Babes in the Wood. The theatre became moderately successful in the 1980s, producing a number of shows including Cabaret and the legendary UK tour of The Rocky Horror Show. The theatre's finances and management were troubled, suffering numerous lawsuits, bankruptcy hearings and new management teams.

Whilst the nearby Regent Theatre obtained funding to be refurbished, local businessman Mike Lloyd purchased the Theatre Royal in 1996 and commenced a full refurbishment and renamed the building 'The Royal'. This too failed, with the building being sold off and gutted in 2000. Purchased by Luminar Leisure, it now houses two nightclubs.
