= Grand Theatre, Blackpool =

UK theatre (opened 1894)

Blackpool Grand Theatre
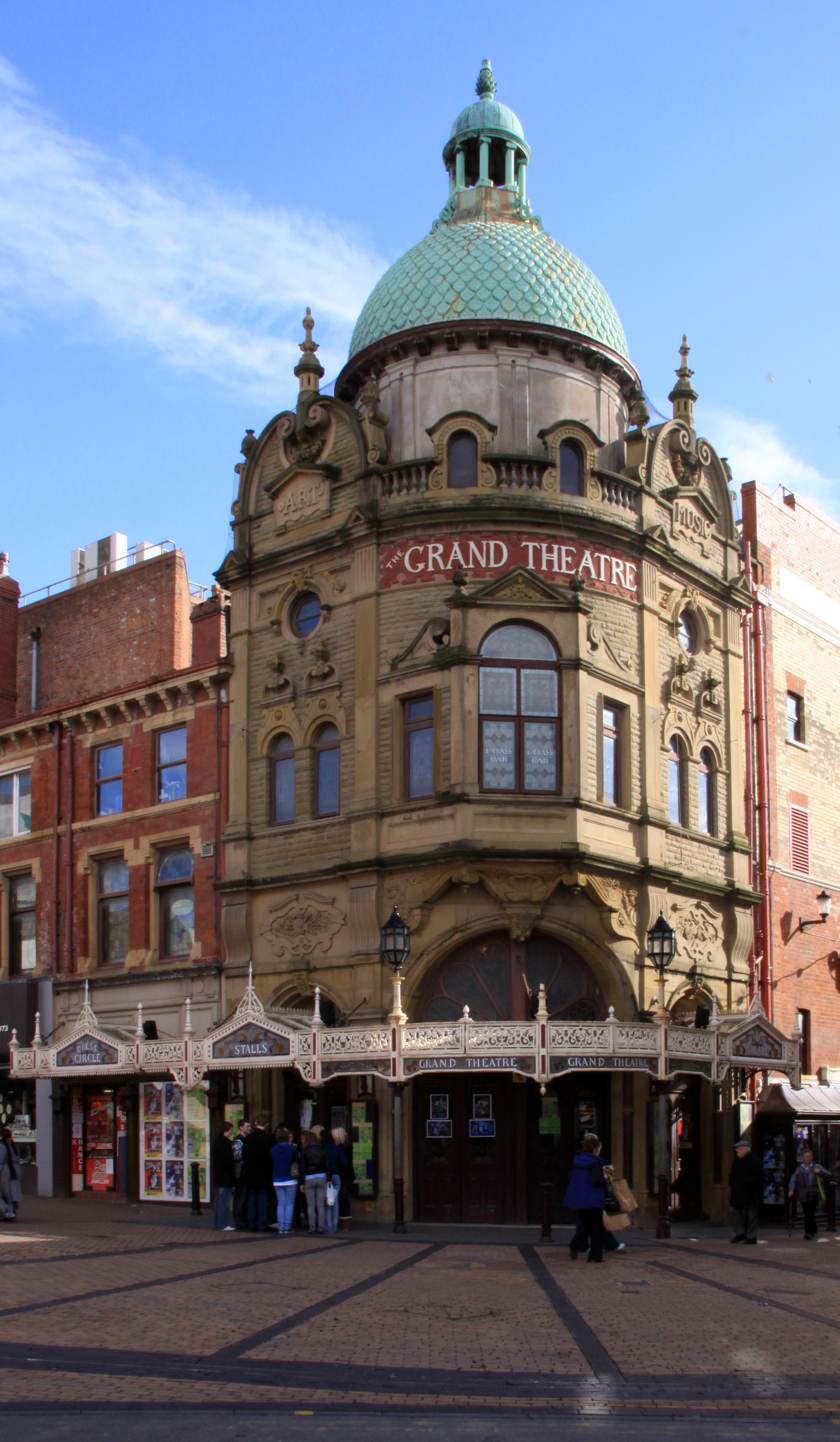
- Blackpool Grand Theatre

- Location in Blackpool
- Address: 33 Church Street; Blackpool; England
- Coordinates: 53.817287°N 3.053476°W
- Owner: Blackpool Grand Theatre Trust Ltd
- Capacity: 1,100
- Type: Provincial

Construction
- Opened: 1894
- Reopened: 23 March 1981
- Architect: Frank Matcham

Website
- www.BlackpoolGrand.co.uk

Listed Building – Grade II*
- Official name: Grand Theatre
- Designated: 26 January 1972
- Reference no.: 1280615

Blackpool Grand Theatre, known locally as The Grand, is a theatre in Blackpool, Lancashire, England. Since 2006, it has also been known as the National Theatre of Variety. It is a Grade II* Listed Building.

== History ==
The Grand was designed by Victorian theatre architect Frank Matcham and was opened in 1894 after a construction period of seven months, at a cost of £20,000 between December 1893 and July 1894. The project was conceived and financed by local theatre manager Thomas Sergenson who had been using the site of the Grand for several years to stage a circus. He had also transformed the fortunes of other local theatres.

Matcham's brief was to build Sergenson the "prettiest theatre in the land". The Grand was Matcham's first theatre to use an innovative 'cantilever' design to support the tiers, thereby reducing the need for the usual pillars and so allowing clear views of the stage from all parts of the auditorium.

Sergenson's successful directorship of the theatre ended in 1909 when he sold the operation to the Blackpool Tower Company for a considerable profit.

The success of the Grand continued through World War I and on until the 1930s. The theatre now faced stiff competition from the newly introduced talking pictures and the building was operated as a cinema outside the summer tourist season. This practice continued until 1938 when the nearby Opera House was constructed.

The Grand was able to stay open during World War II but the post-war rise in the popularity of television was probably the cause of the theatre's dwindling popularity toward the 1960s. The theatre's programme archives show that from 1964 the Grand was a summer seasonal venue. Plans were filed for the demolition of the historic site in 1972 but the Grand had become a Grade II* listed building earlier in the year, thanks to the initiative Jeffrey Finestone, a member of the Victorian Society. This enabled a group of theatre friends to successfully oppose any redevelopment.

The theatre was unused for three years before an agreement was reached with the Grand's owners, EMI, that a refurbishment of the then unused building would take place if it could be used as a bingo hall. After three years of bingo use, the group of friends, now called the Friends of the Grand, with the support of Blackpool Borough Council negotiated to lease and eventually buy the theatre back from EMI over a period of a few years. The purchase was complete by 1 October 1980 and a refurbishment, achieved partly through voluntary effort, was begun. Finally, on 23 March 1981 the Grand re-opened as a theatre once again to stage an Old Vic performance of William Shakespeare's The Merchant of Venice featuring Timothy West and Prunella Scales. The theatre's return was further confirmed in May of the same year when a Royal Variety Performance was staged in the presence of Charles, Prince of Wales.

== Current status ==
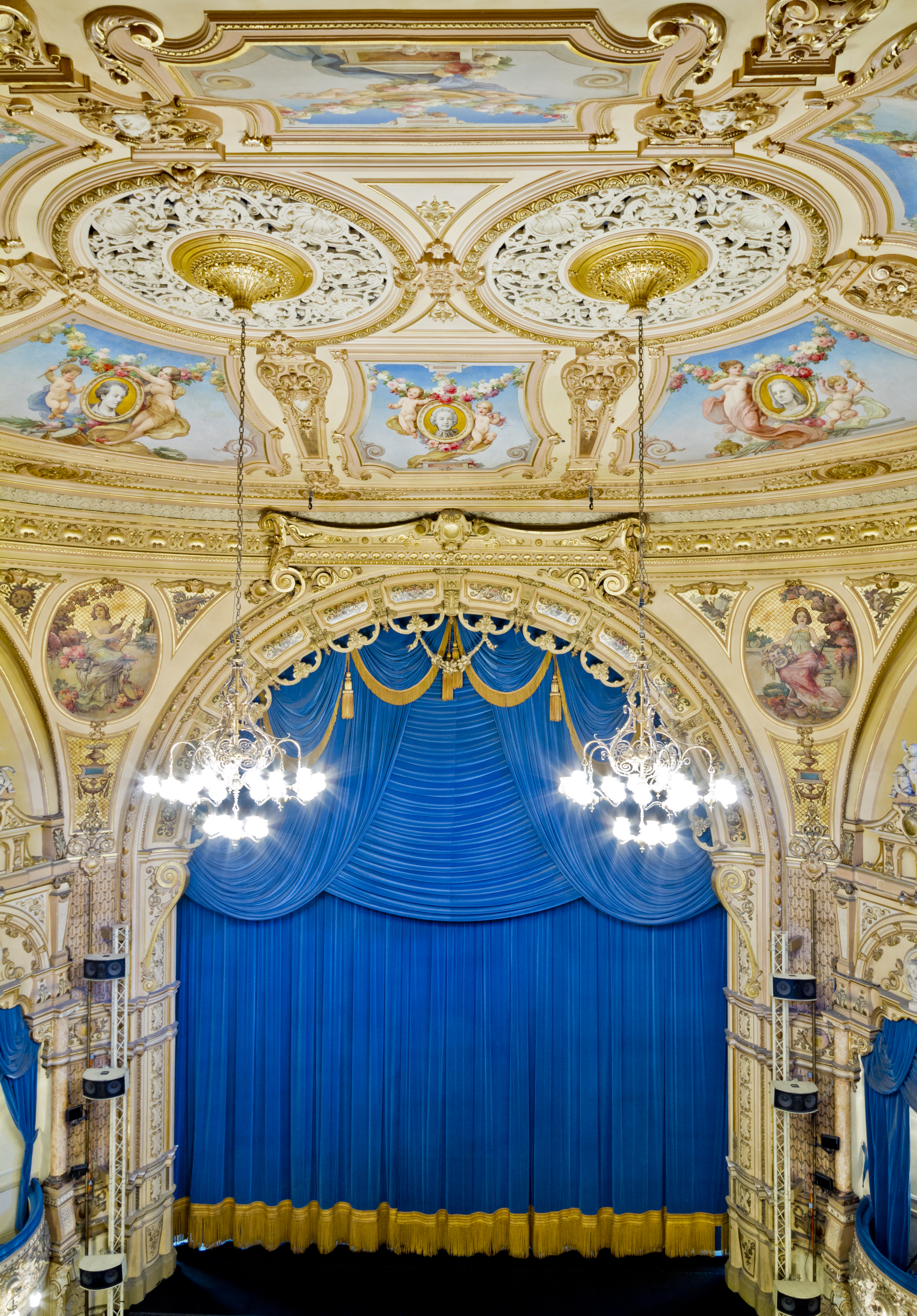
Inside the theatre

The theatre saw its centenary in 1994 and a restoration project was begun in the 1990s that was completed in 2007 after fifteen years of work and about £3million of investment.

In 2006, the Grand was named the United Kingdom's National Theatre of Variety. The title was awarded nationally by Equity who staged an all-star gala performance to celebrate the theatre's new accolade.

Since reopening in 1981, the board of directors of Blackpool Grand Theatre Trust Limited, theatre proprietors, has been led by chairmen John Hodgson (to 1981), W Geoffrey Thompson OBE (1982 to 1993), Samuel G Lee (1993 to 2003), David Coupe (2003 to 2009) and Anthony P Stone (2009 to present).

== Friends of the Grand ==
The Friends of the Grand supports the Grand Theatre and its programme of events. Formed in 1973 to save the building from demolition, the first Friends were literally 'hands-on'. They painted the dressing rooms, repaired holes to the ceiling and helped to get the theatre into shape.

Funds were raised in many ways, including Midnight Matinées; all part of the bid to save the theatre. Early Friends included Violet Carson, Alistair Cooke, Ken Dodd, Leslie Crowther, Timothy West, Prunella Scales, Billy Pearce and Johnnie Casson.

The role of the Friends of the Grand has changed over the years. They now raise funds from subscriptions and social events to finance projects within the theatre, primarily aimed at enhancing the comfort of the patrons. The Friends have contributed in excess of £750,800 towards projects including the provision of new carpets, seating and technical equipment. By Autumn 2008, the Friends had contributed almost £250,000 to the Sam Lee Appeal to improve the amenities and to renovate the theatre interior.

The Friends are also the founding angel of the National Theatre of Variety.
