= Academy Award for Best Actor =

Award presented annually by the Academy of Motion Picture Arts and Sciences

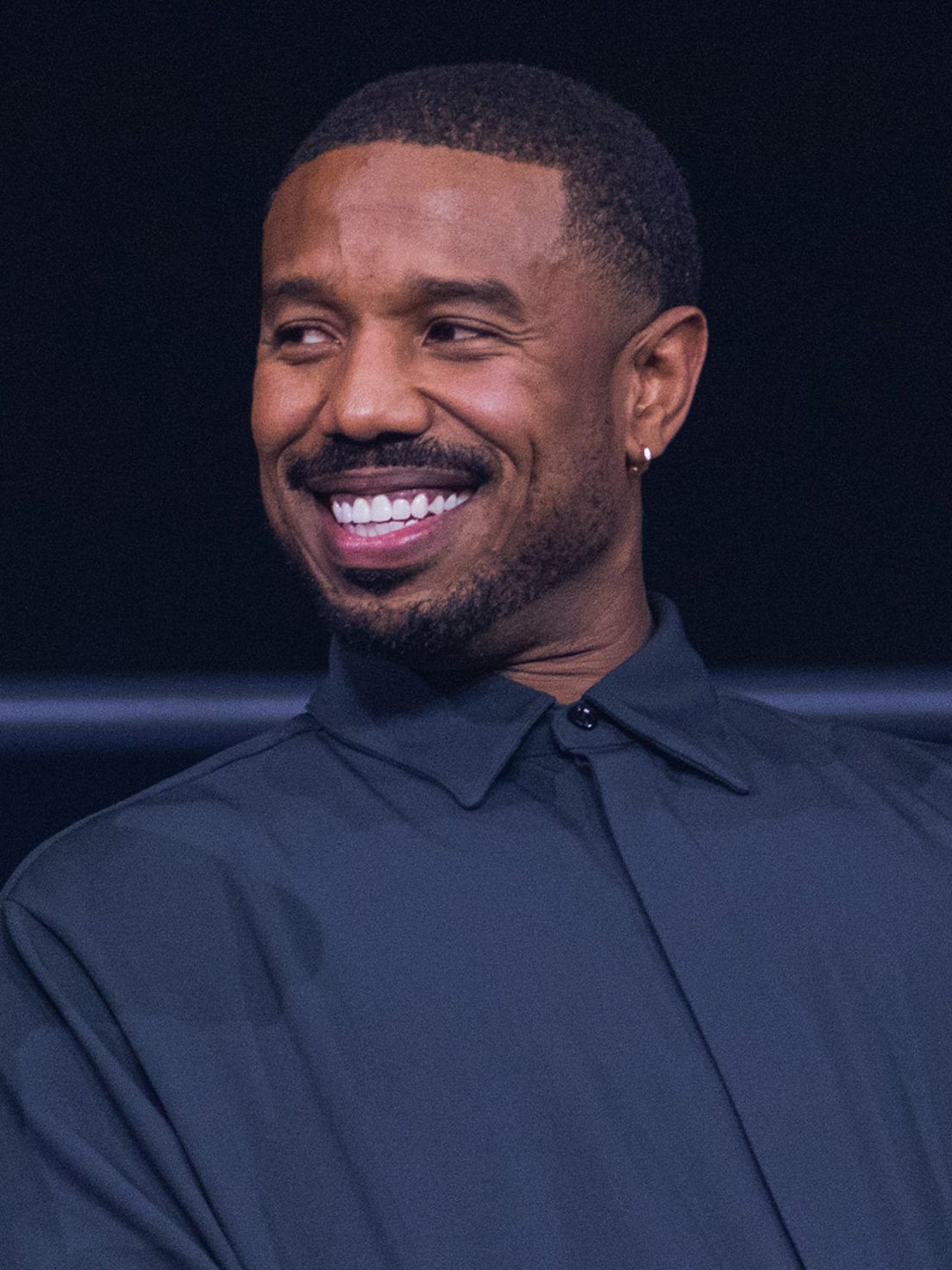
- The 2026 recipient: Michael B. Jordan
- Awarded for: Best Performance by an Actor in a Leading Role
- Country: United States
- Presented by: Academy of Motion Picture Arts and Sciences (AMPAS)
- First award: May 16, 1929; 97 years ago (for films released during the 1927/1928 film season)
- Most recent winner: Michael B. Jordan, Sinners (2025)

Highlights
- Most awards: Daniel Day-Lewis (3)
- Most nominations: Laurence Olivier and Spencer Tracy (9)
- Website: oscars.org

The Academy Award for Best Actor is an award presented annually by the Academy of Motion Picture Arts and Sciences (AMPAS). It has been awarded since the 1st Academy Awards to an actor who has delivered an outstanding performance in a leading role in a film released that year. The award was traditionally presented by the previous year's Best Actress winner. However, in recent years, it has shifted towards being presented by previous years' Best Actor winners instead.

The Best Actor award has been presented 98 times, to 87 actors. The first winner was German actor Emil Jannings for his roles in The Last Command (1928) and The Way of All Flesh (1927). The most recent winner is Michael B. Jordan for his dual role as twin brothers Elijah and Elias Moore in Sinners (2025). The record for most wins is three, held by Daniel Day-Lewis, and ten other actors have won twice. The record for most nominations is nine, held jointly by Spencer Tracy and Laurence Olivier. At the 5th Academy Awards in 1932, Fredric March finished one vote ahead of Wallace Beery; under the rules of the time this resulted in them sharing the award, the only time this has occurred.

== Nominations process ==
Nominees are currently determined by single transferable vote within the actors branch of AMPAS; winners are selected by a plurality vote from the entire eligible voting members of the Academy.

In the first three years of the awards, actors and actresses were nominated as the best individuals in their categories. At that time, all of their work during the qualifying period (as many as three films, in some cases) was listed after the award. Despite this, at the 3rd Academy Awards, held in 1930, only one film was cited in each winner's award regardless of how many they were eligible to be considered for during that span. The current system, in which an actor is nominated for a specific performance in a single film, was introduced for the 4th Academy Awards. Starting with the 9th Academy Awards, held in 1937, the category was limited to a maximum five nominations per year.

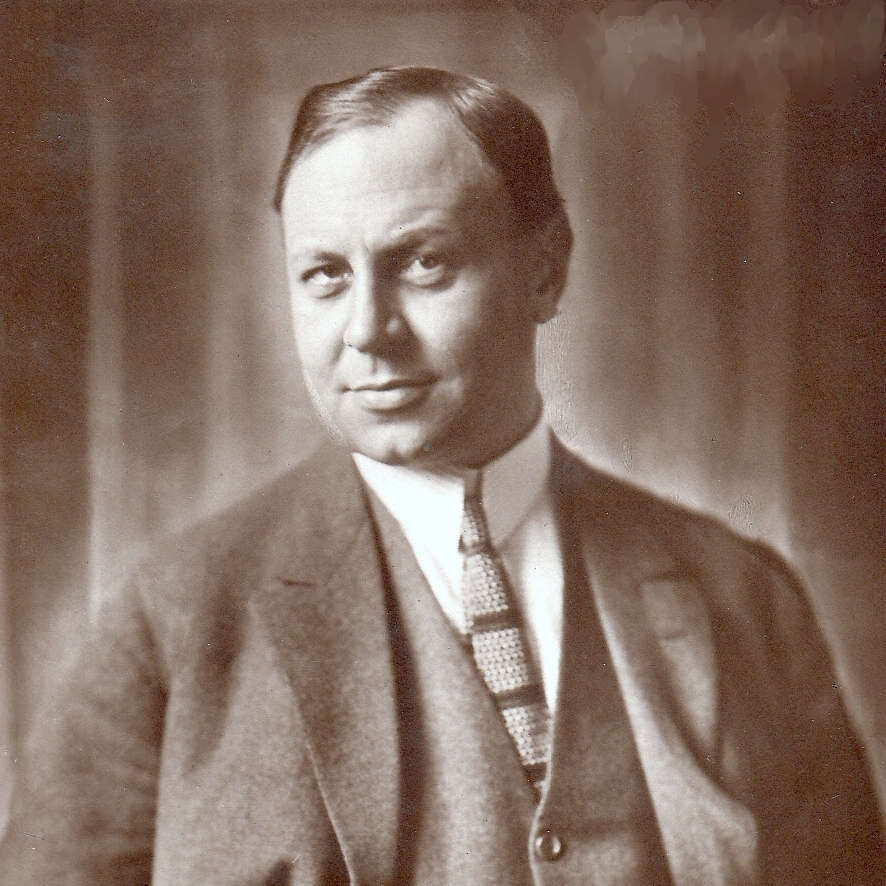
Emil Jannings was the inaugural winner, for two films: The Last Command (1928) and The Way of All Flesh (1927).

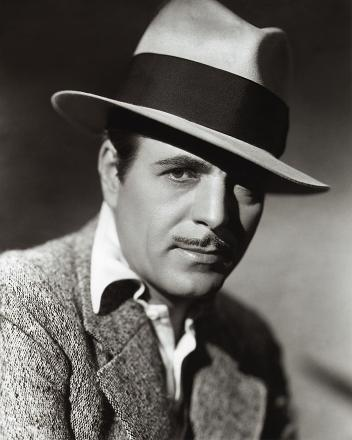
Warner Baxter won for In Old Arizona (1928).

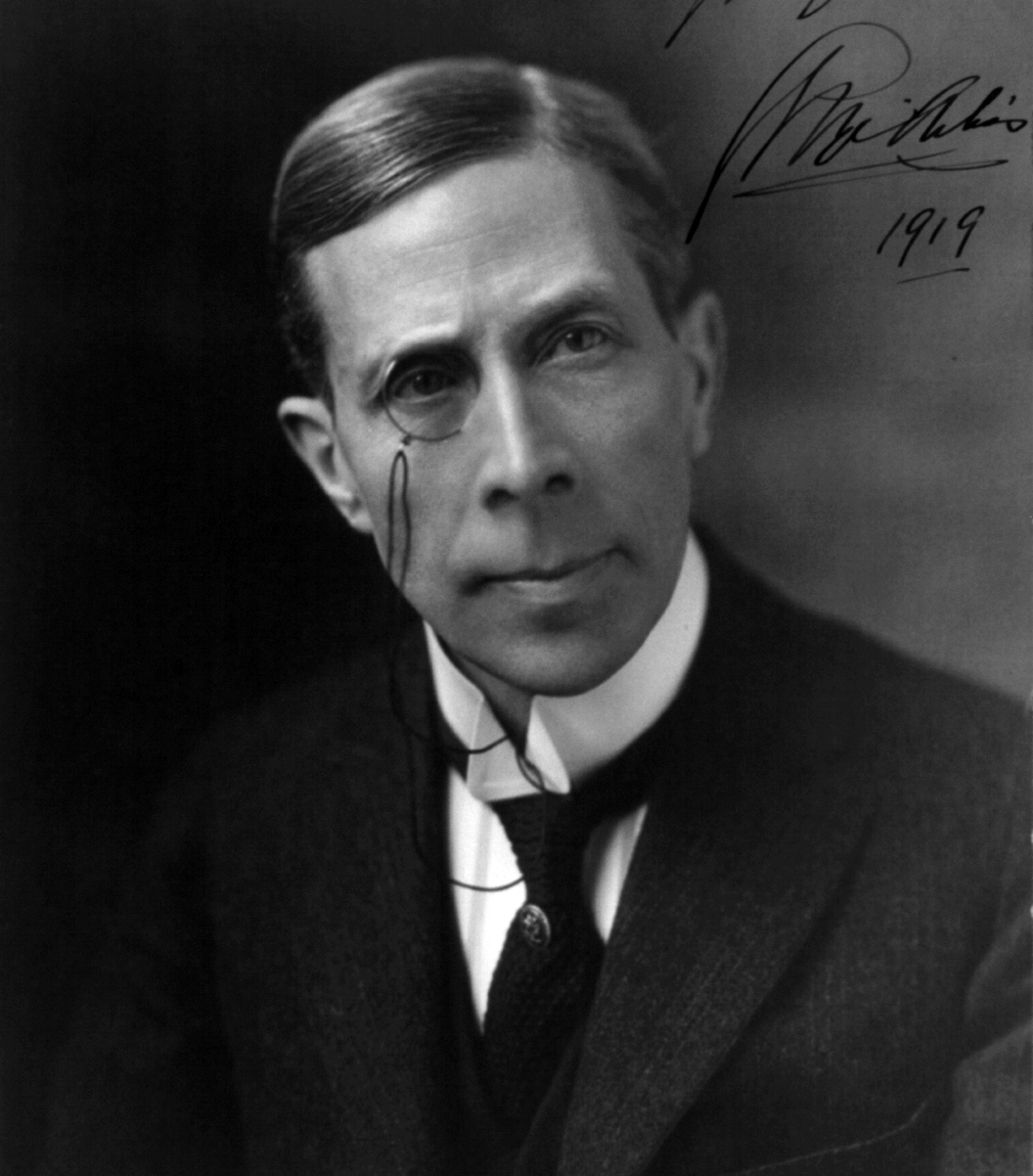
George Arliss won for Disraeli (1929).

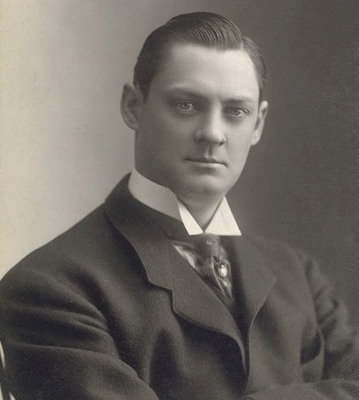
Lionel Barrymore won for A Free Soul (1931).

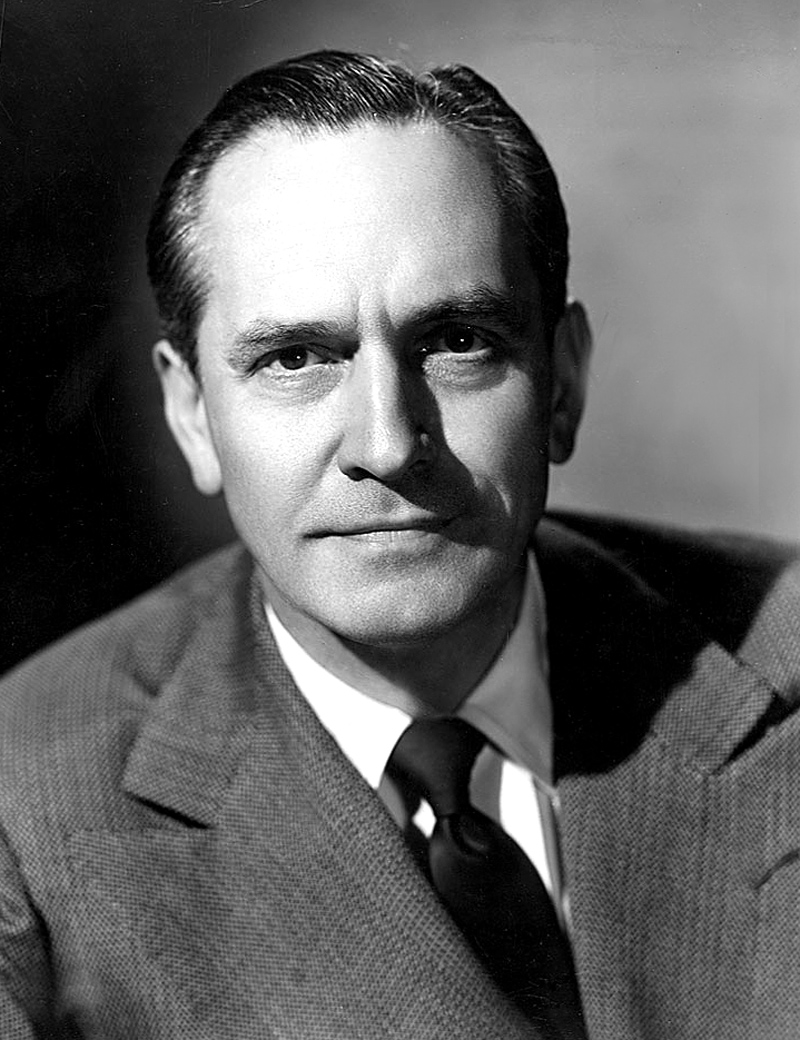
Fredric March won twice, for Dr. Jekyll and Mr. Hyde (1931) and The Best Years of Our Lives (1946).

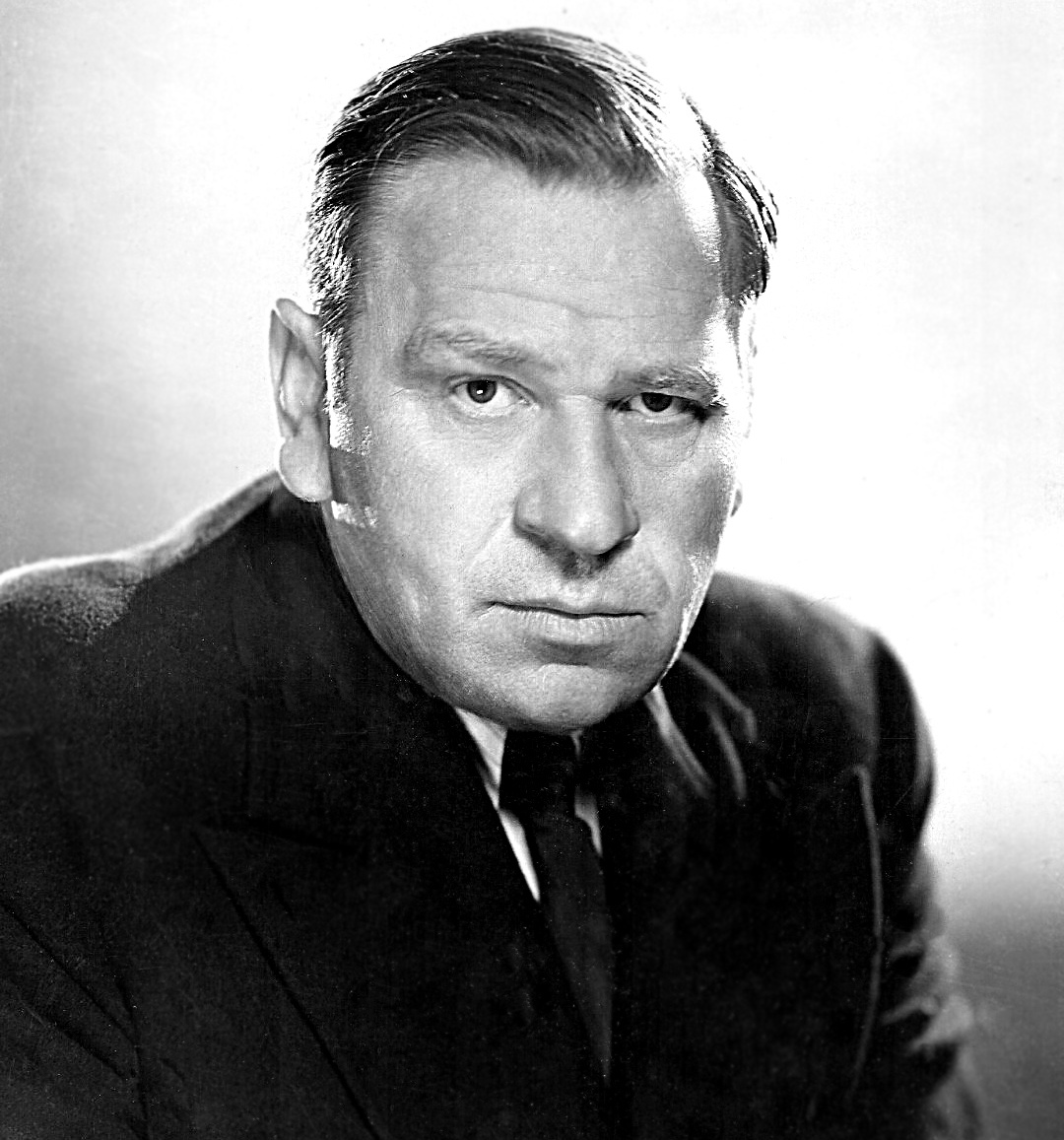
Wallace Beery won for The Champ (1931), in a tie with Fredric March.

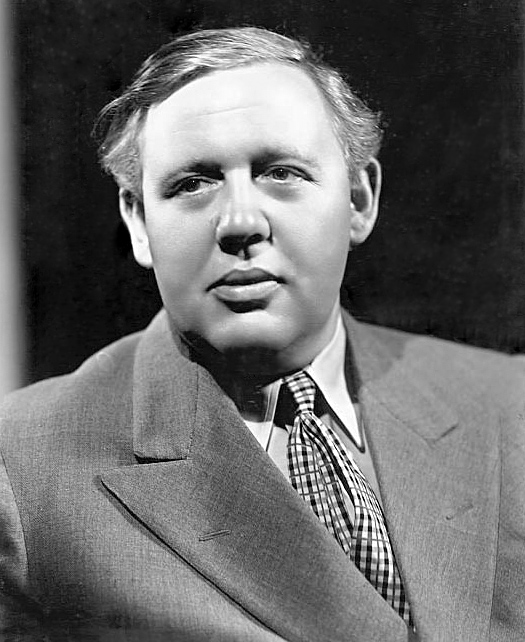
Charles Laughton won for The Private Life of Henry VIII (1933).

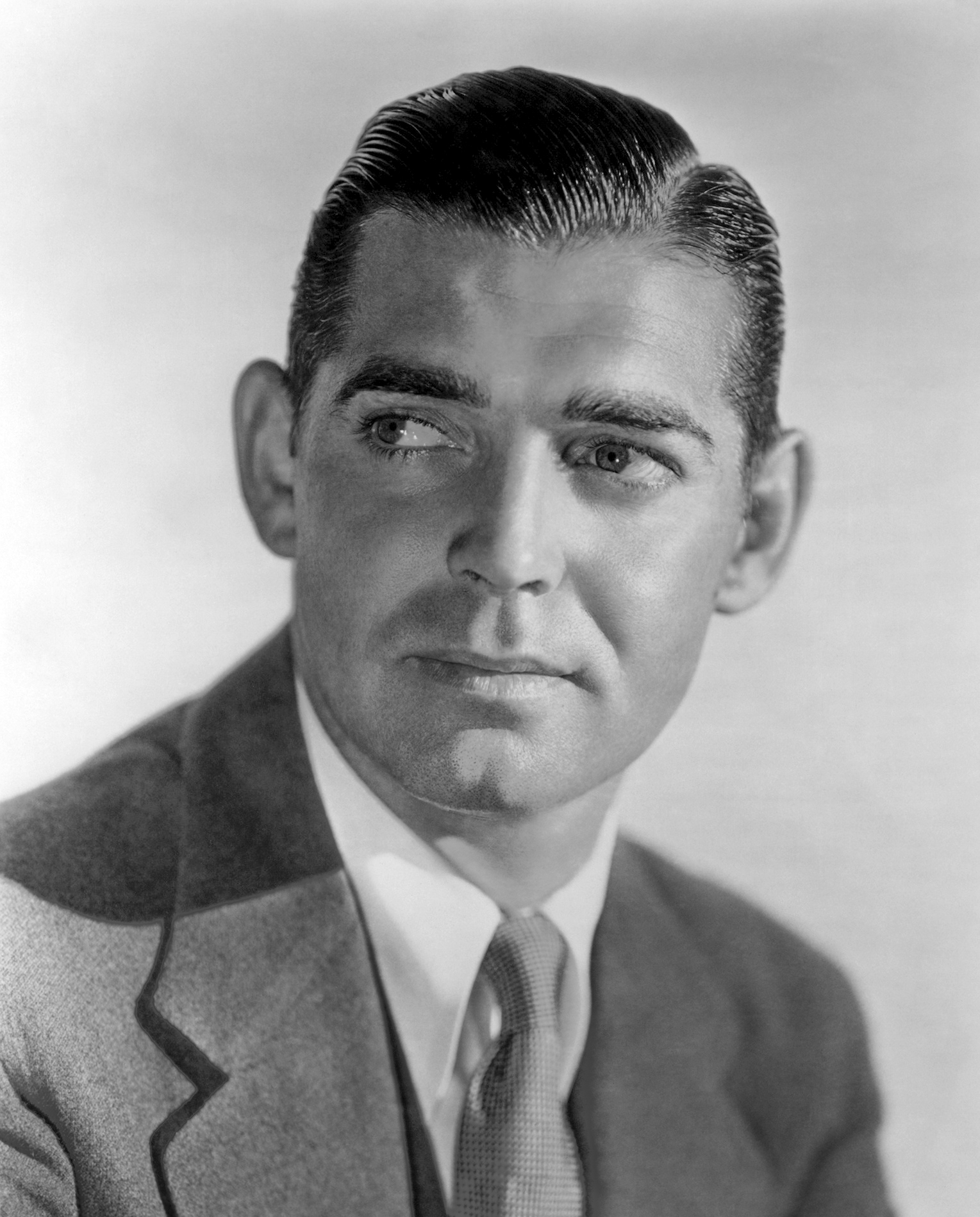
Clark Gable won for It Happened One Night (1934).

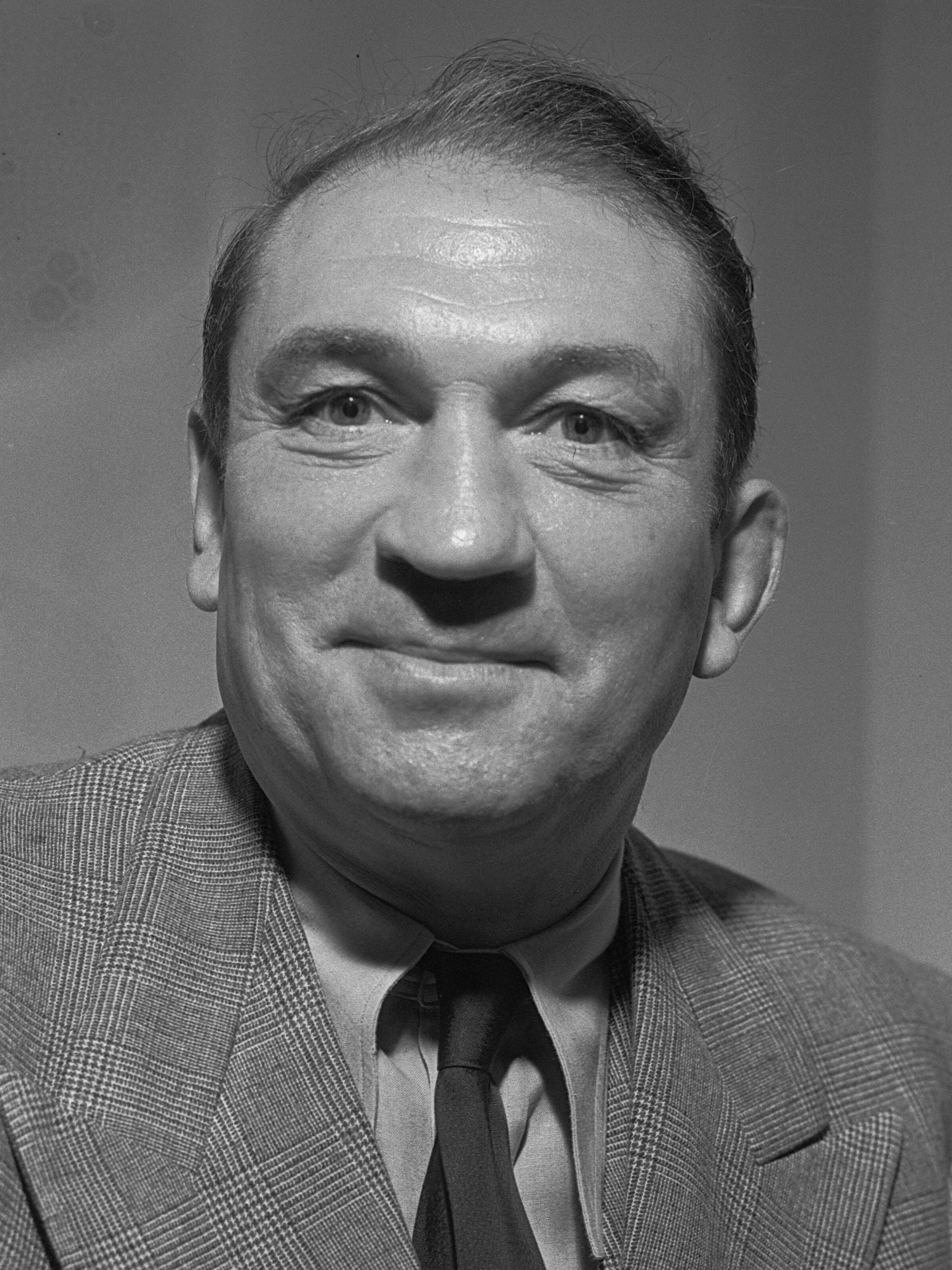
Victor McLaglen won for The Informer (1935).

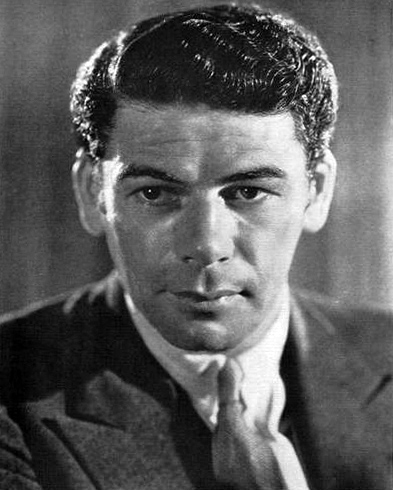
Paul Muni won for The Story of Louis Pasteur (1936).

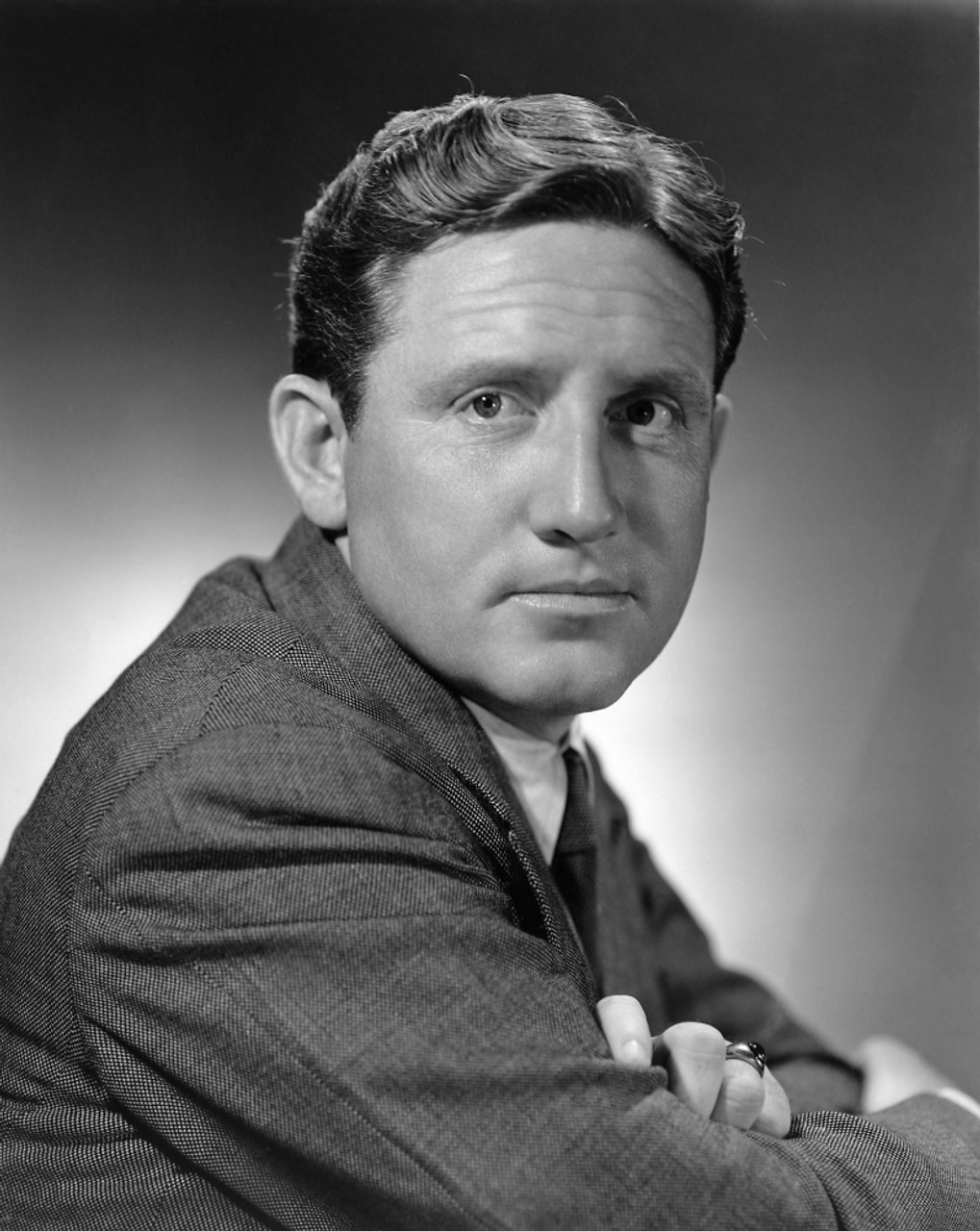
Spencer Tracy was the first actor to consecutively win twice, for Captains Courageous (1937) and Boys Town (1938).

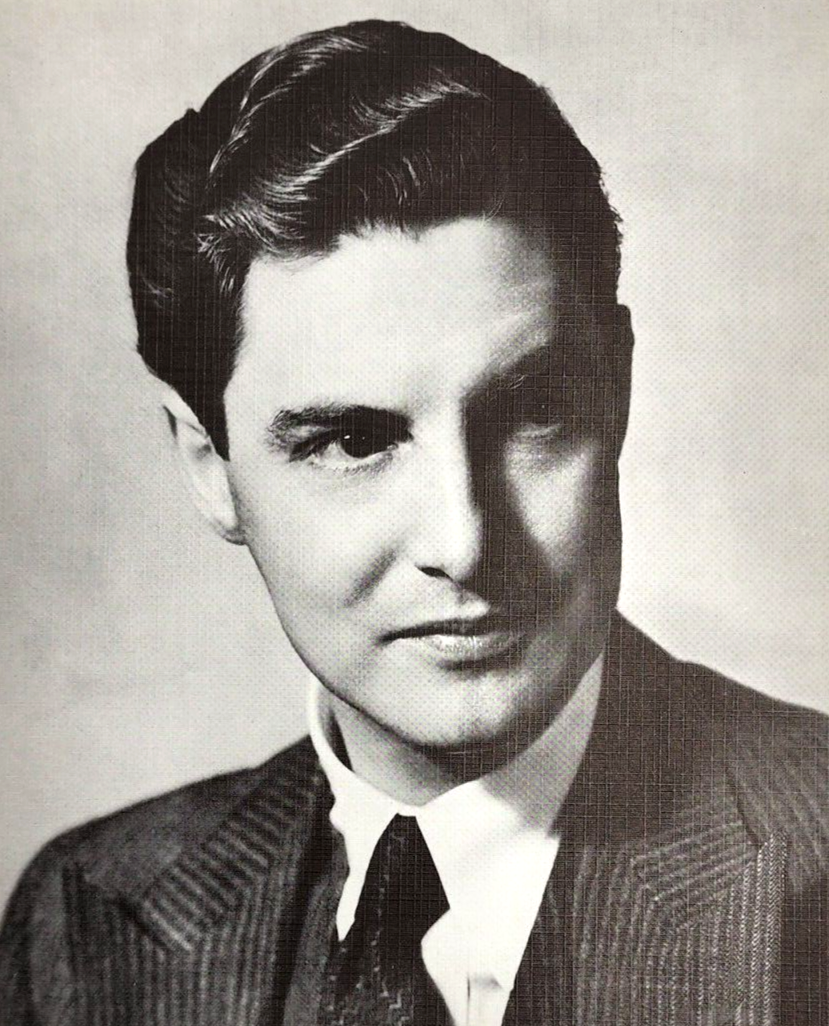
Robert Donat won for Goodbye, Mr. Chips (1939).

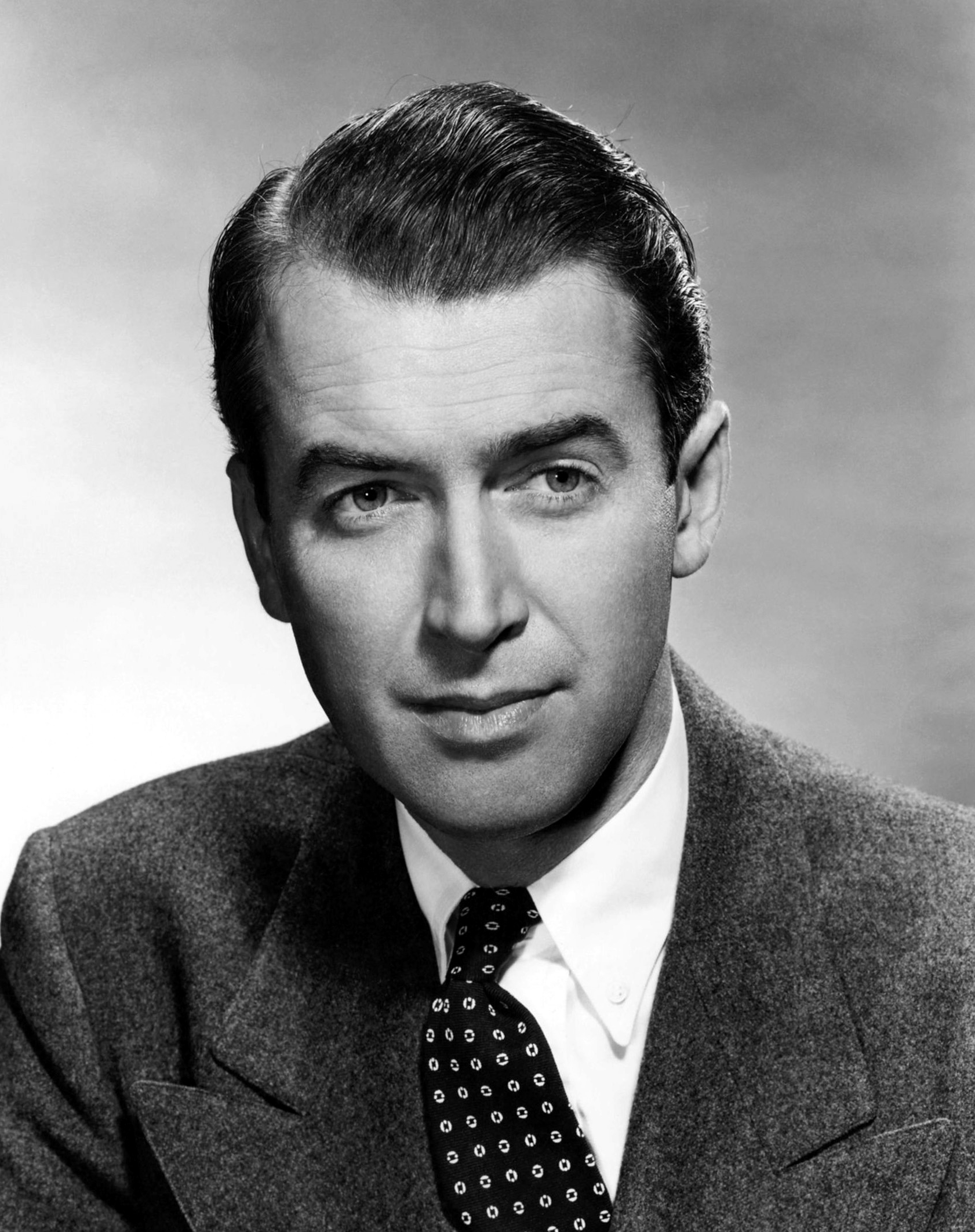
James Stewart won for The Philadelphia Story (1940).

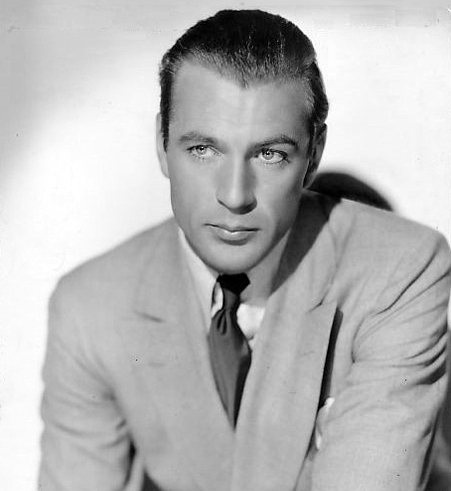
Gary Cooper won twice, for Sergeant York (1941) and High Noon (1952).

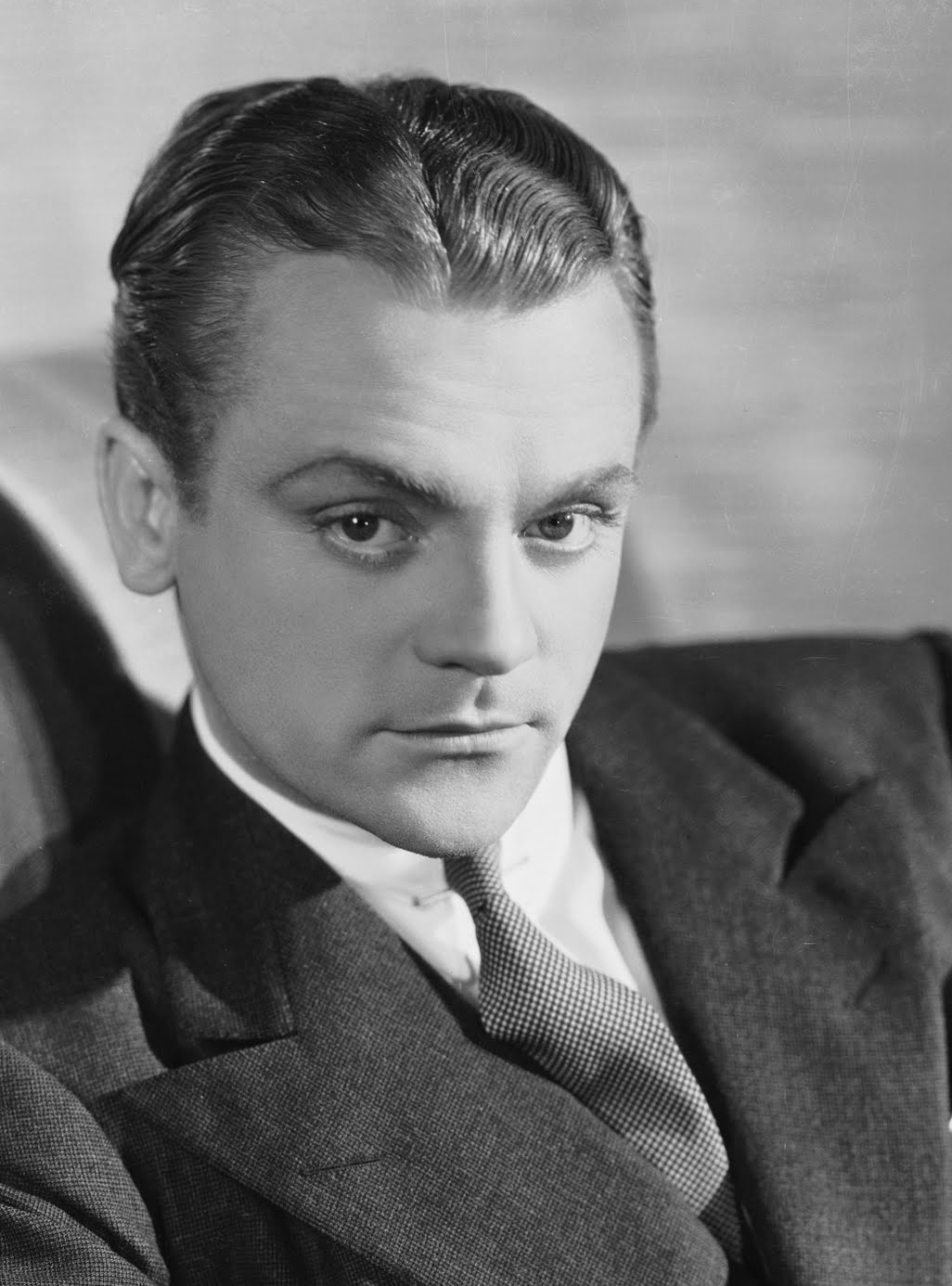
James Cagney won for Yankee Doodle Dandy (1942).

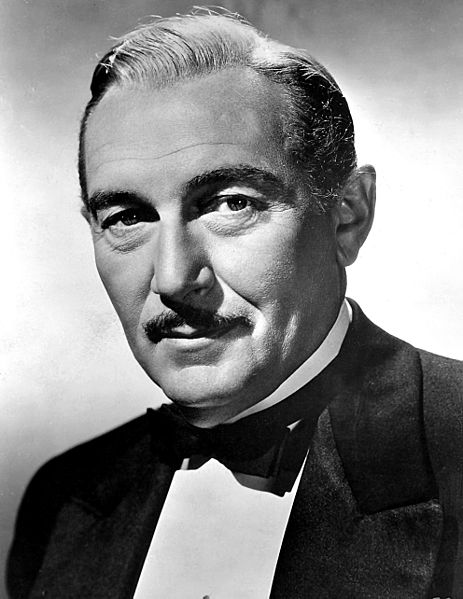
Paul Lukas won for Watch on the Rhine (1943).

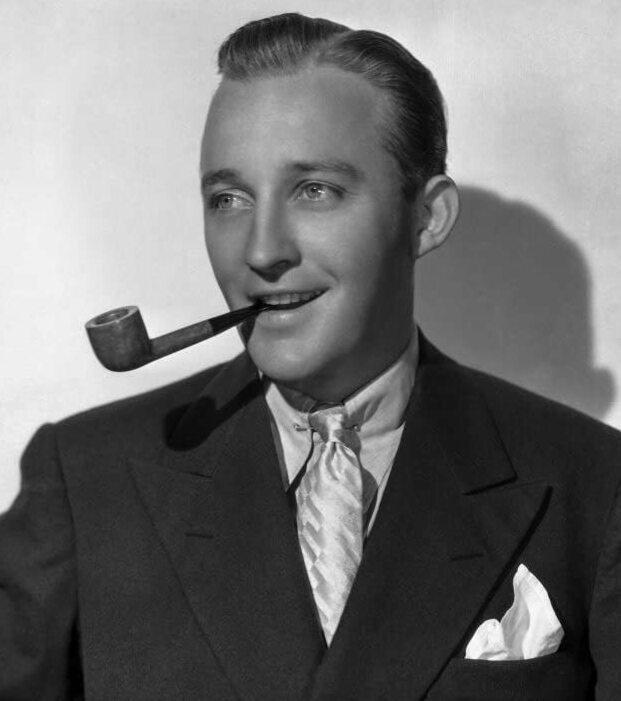
Bing Crosby won for Going My Way (1944).

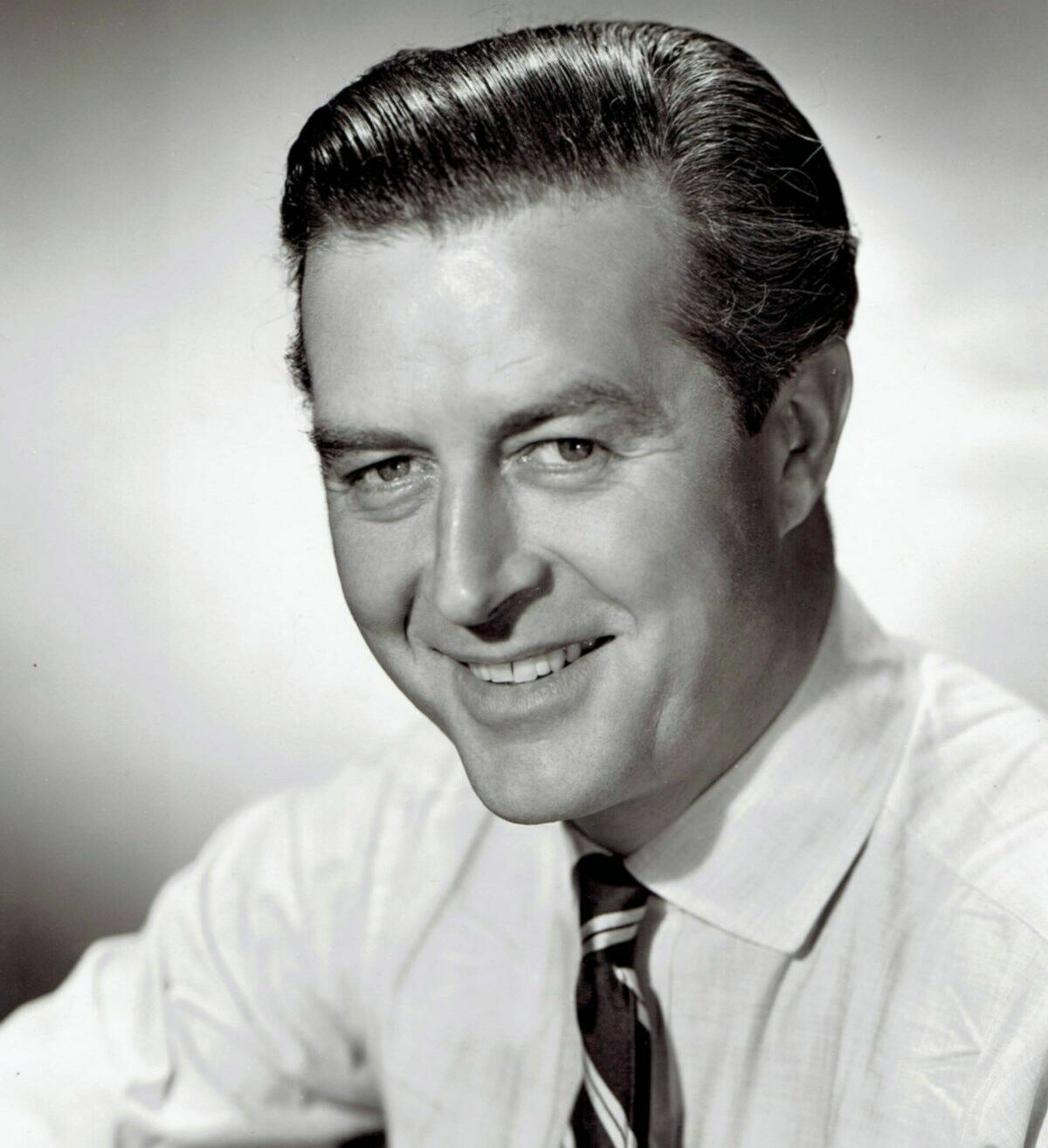
Ray Milland won for The Lost Weekend (1945).

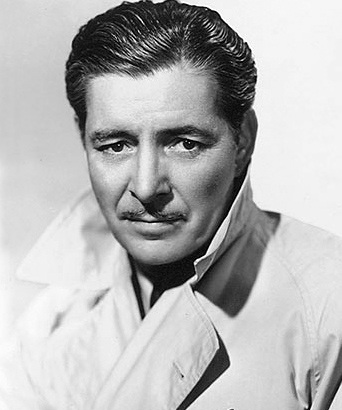
Ronald Colman won for A Double Life (1947).

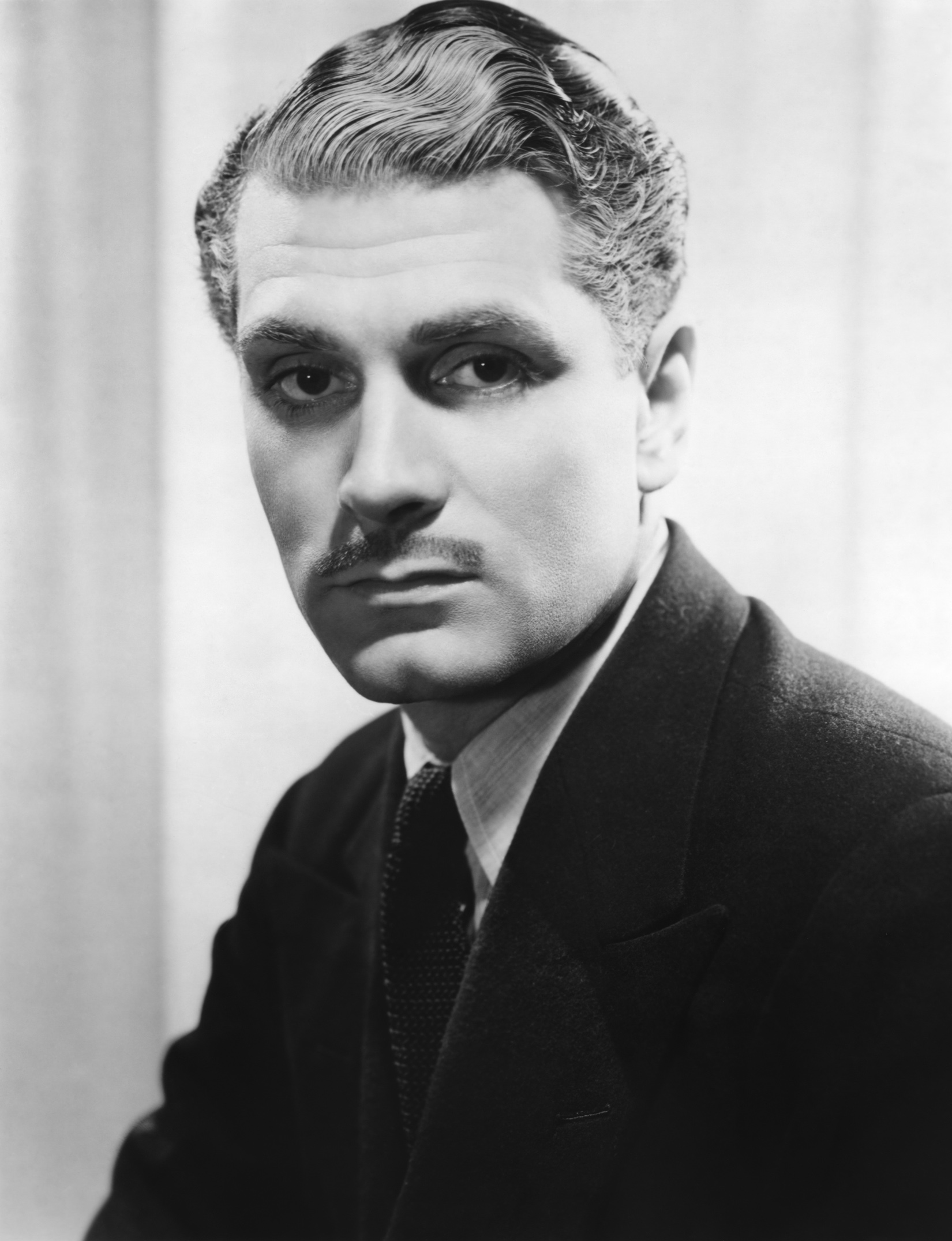
Laurence Olivier won for Hamlet (1948); first self-directed win (and simultaneous Best Picture).

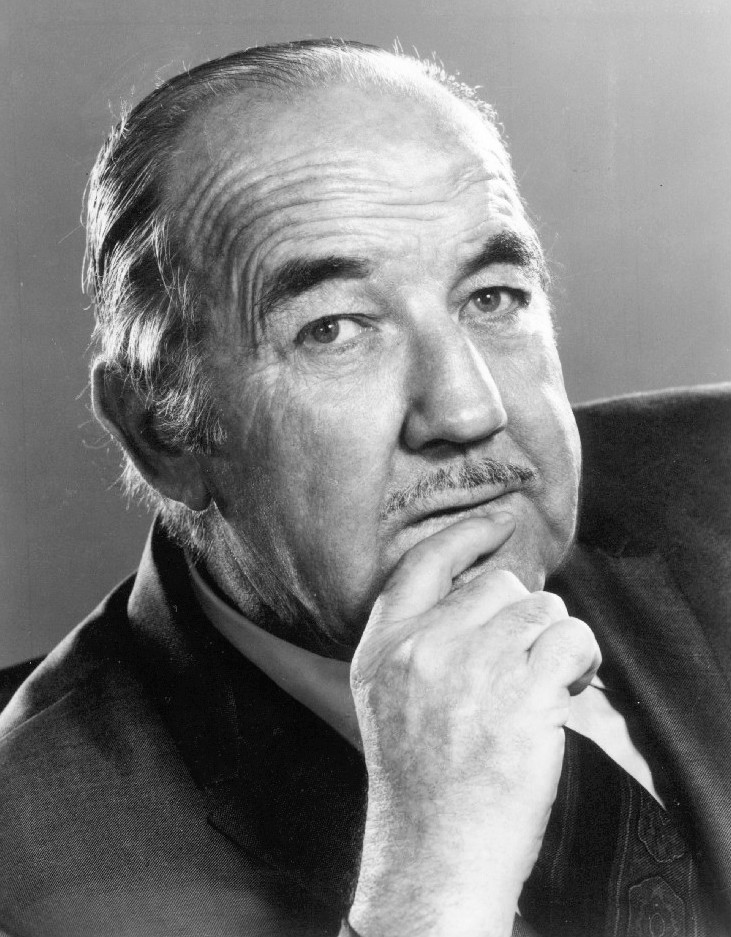
Broderick Crawford won for All the King's Men (1949).

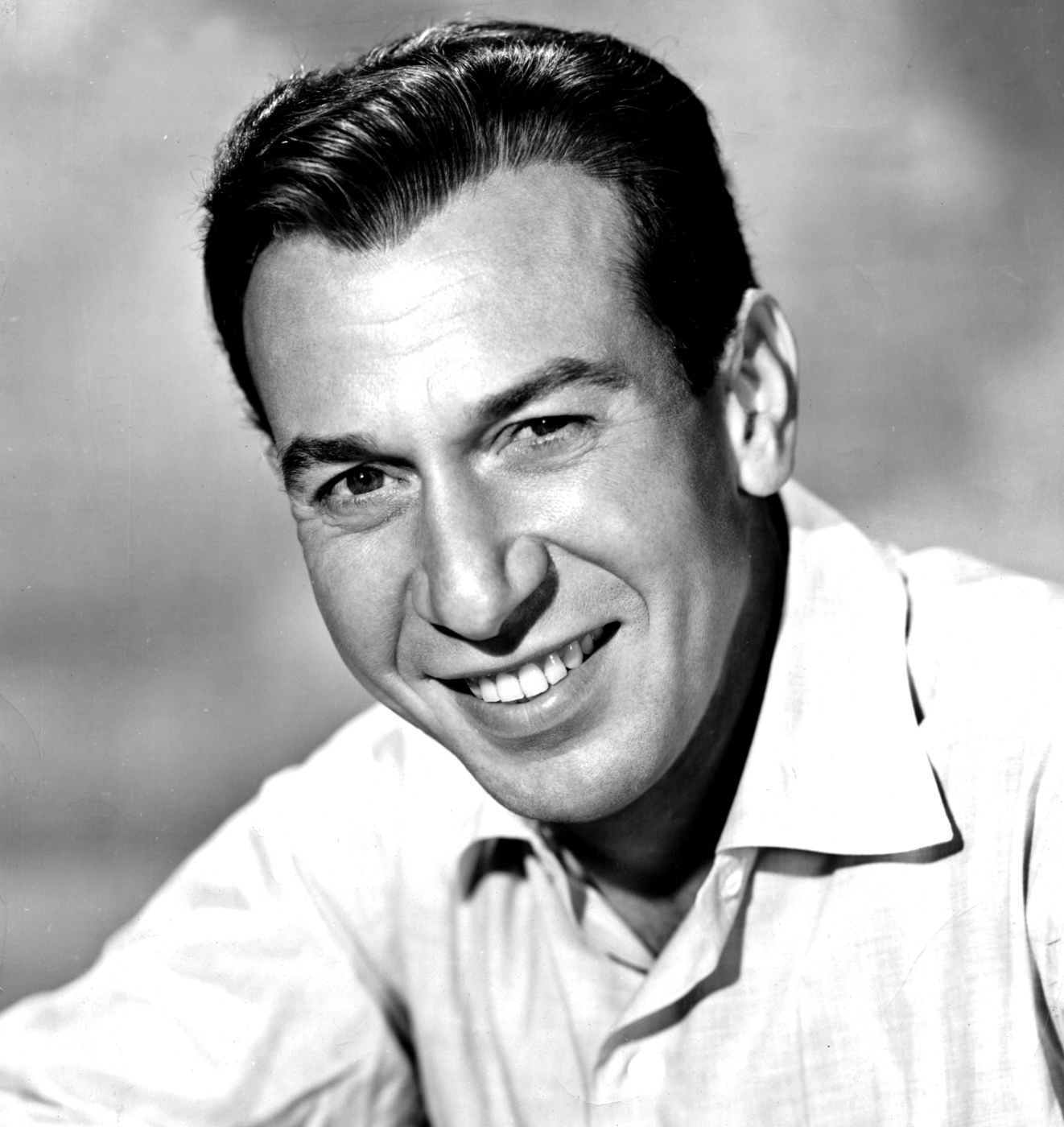
José Ferrer won for Cyrano de Bergerac (1950); Tony winner for the same role–first to accomplish this and the category's first latino winner.

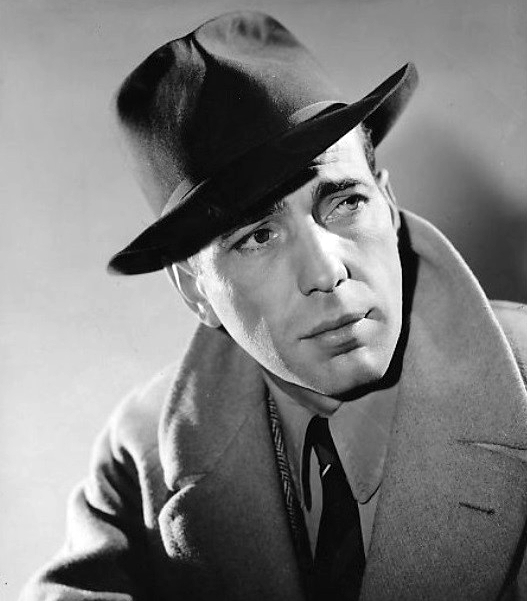
Humphrey Bogart won for The African Queen (1951).

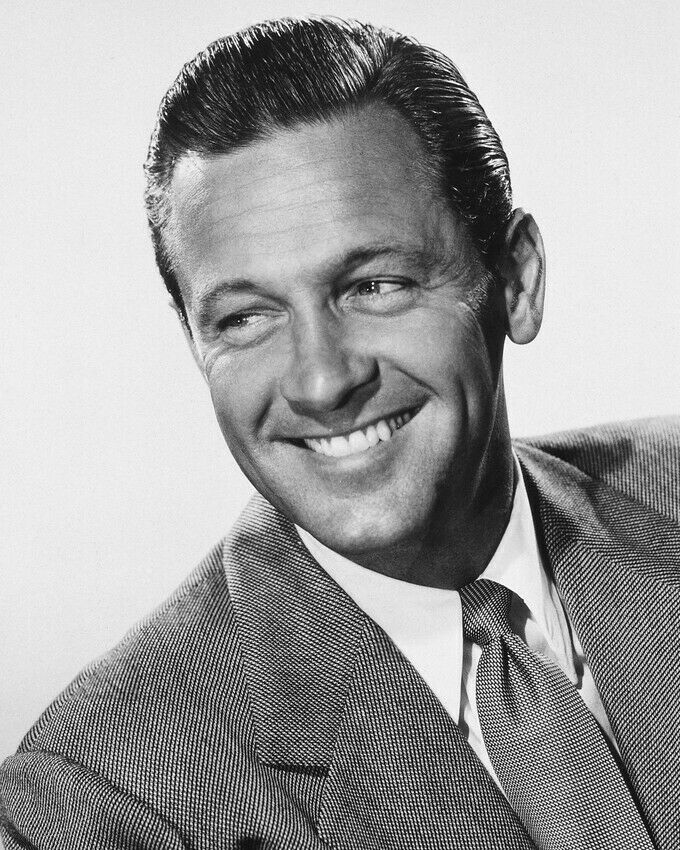
William Holden won for Stalag 17 (1953).

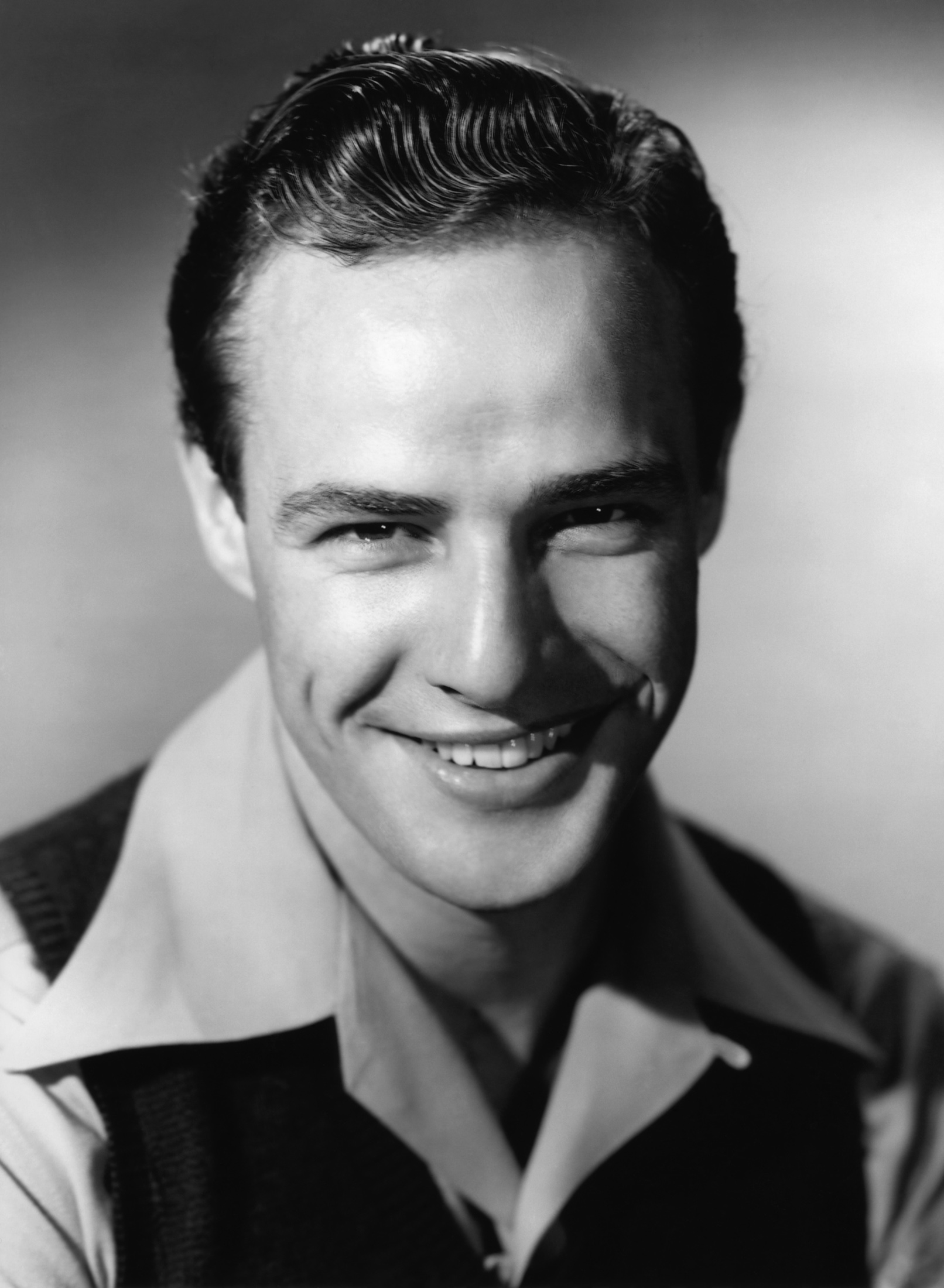
Marlon Brando won twice, for On the Waterfront (1954) and The Godfather (1972).

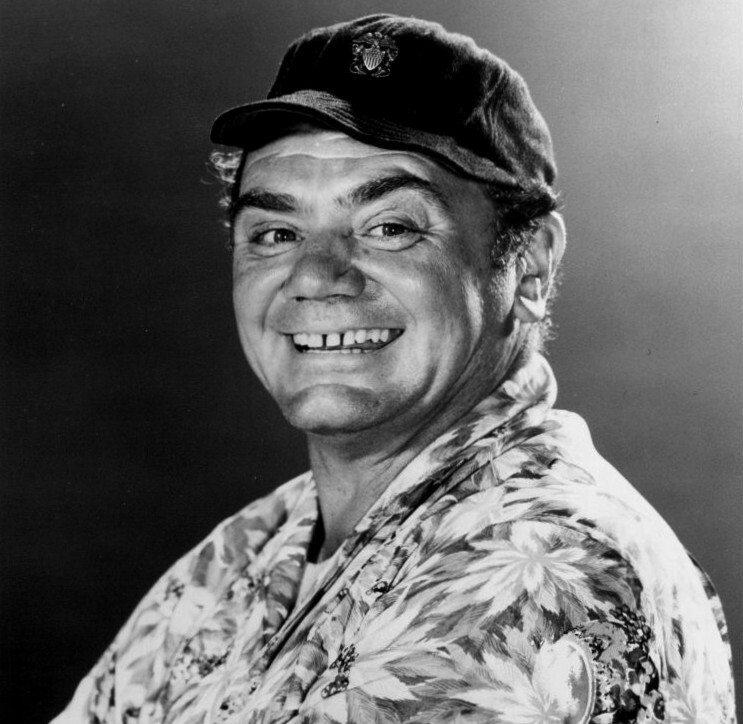
Ernest Borgnine won for Marty (1955).

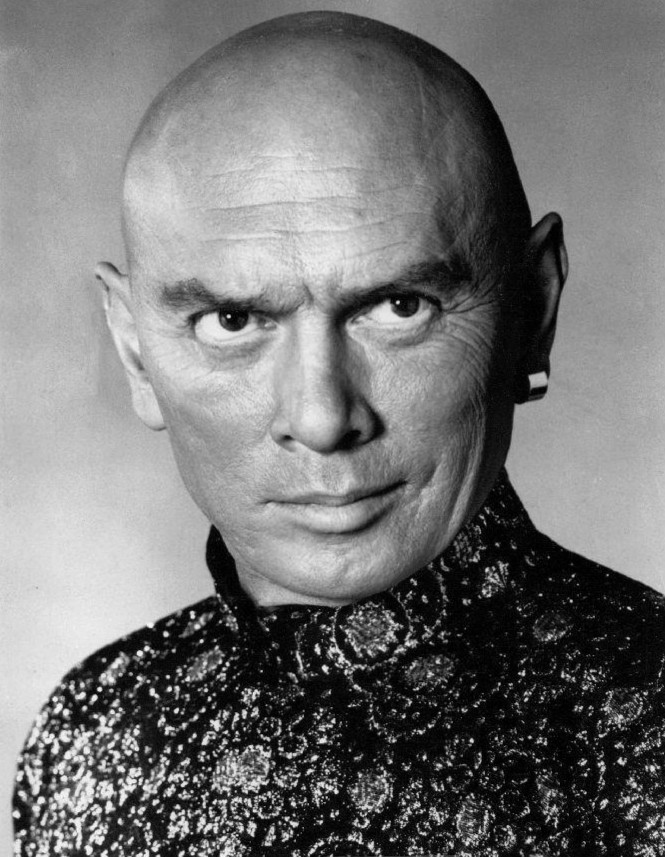
Yul Brynner won for The King and I (1956); first Asian and Russian winner in the category.

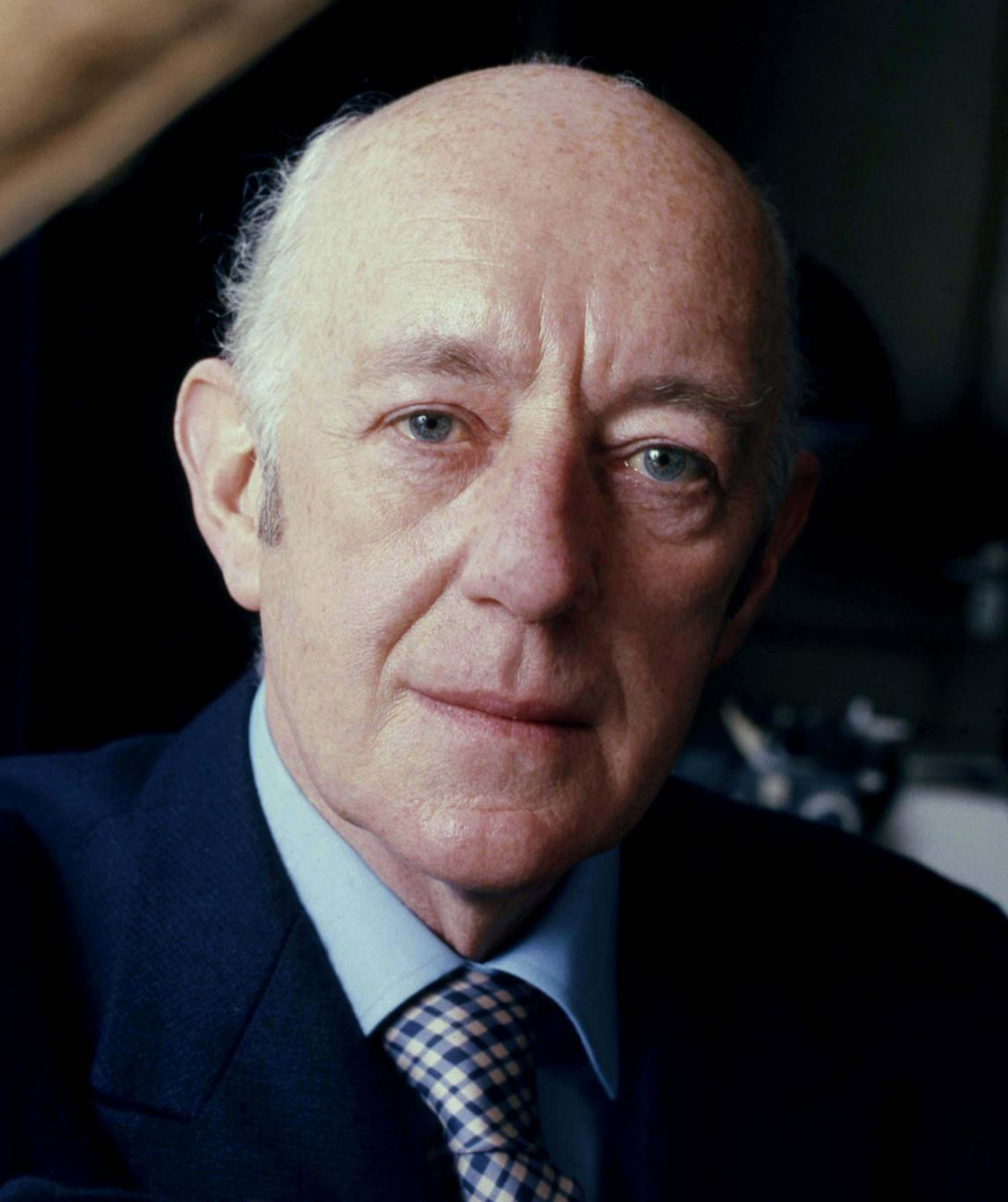
Alec Guinness won for The Bridge on the River Kwai (1957).

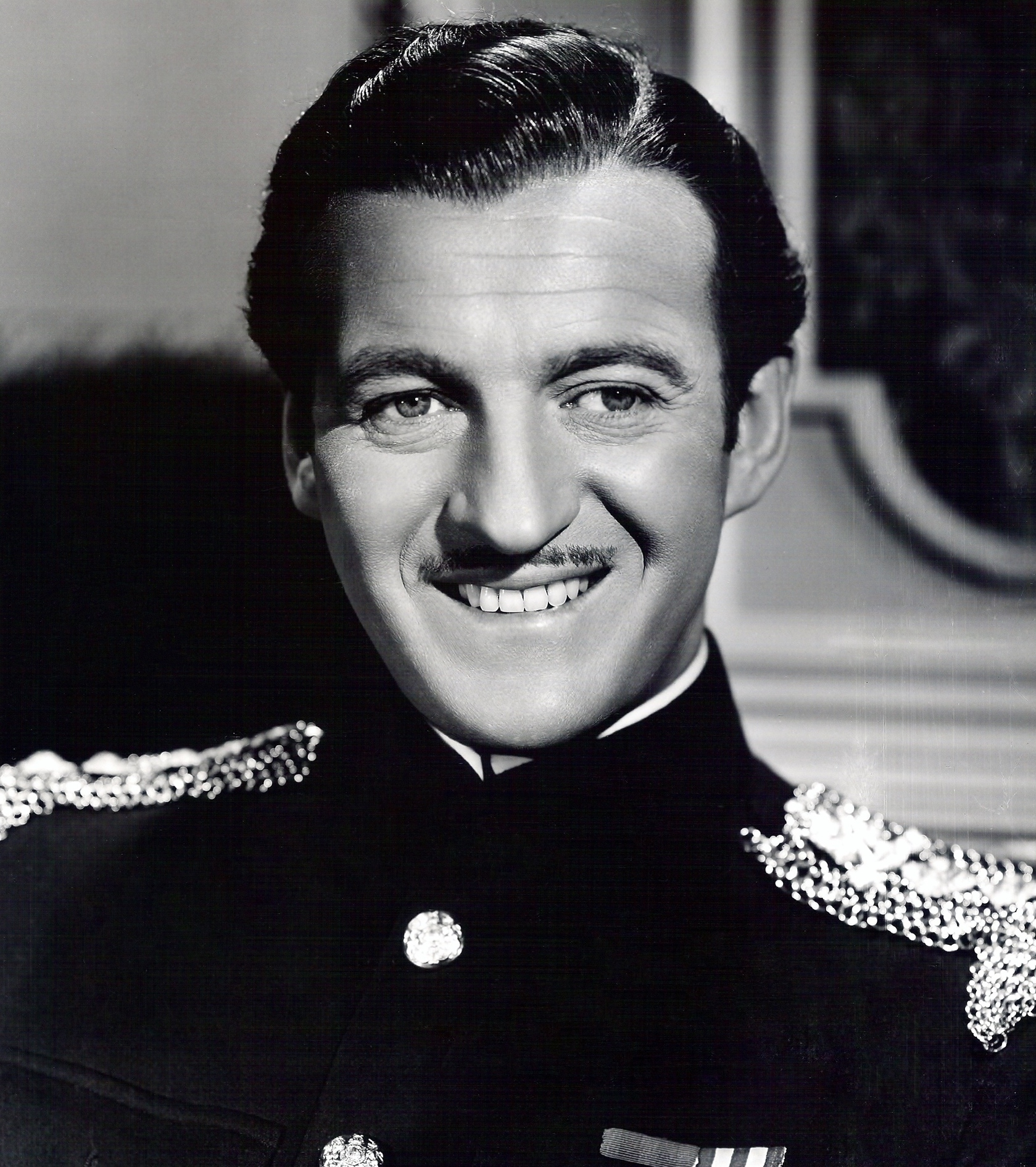
David Niven won for Separate Tables (1958).

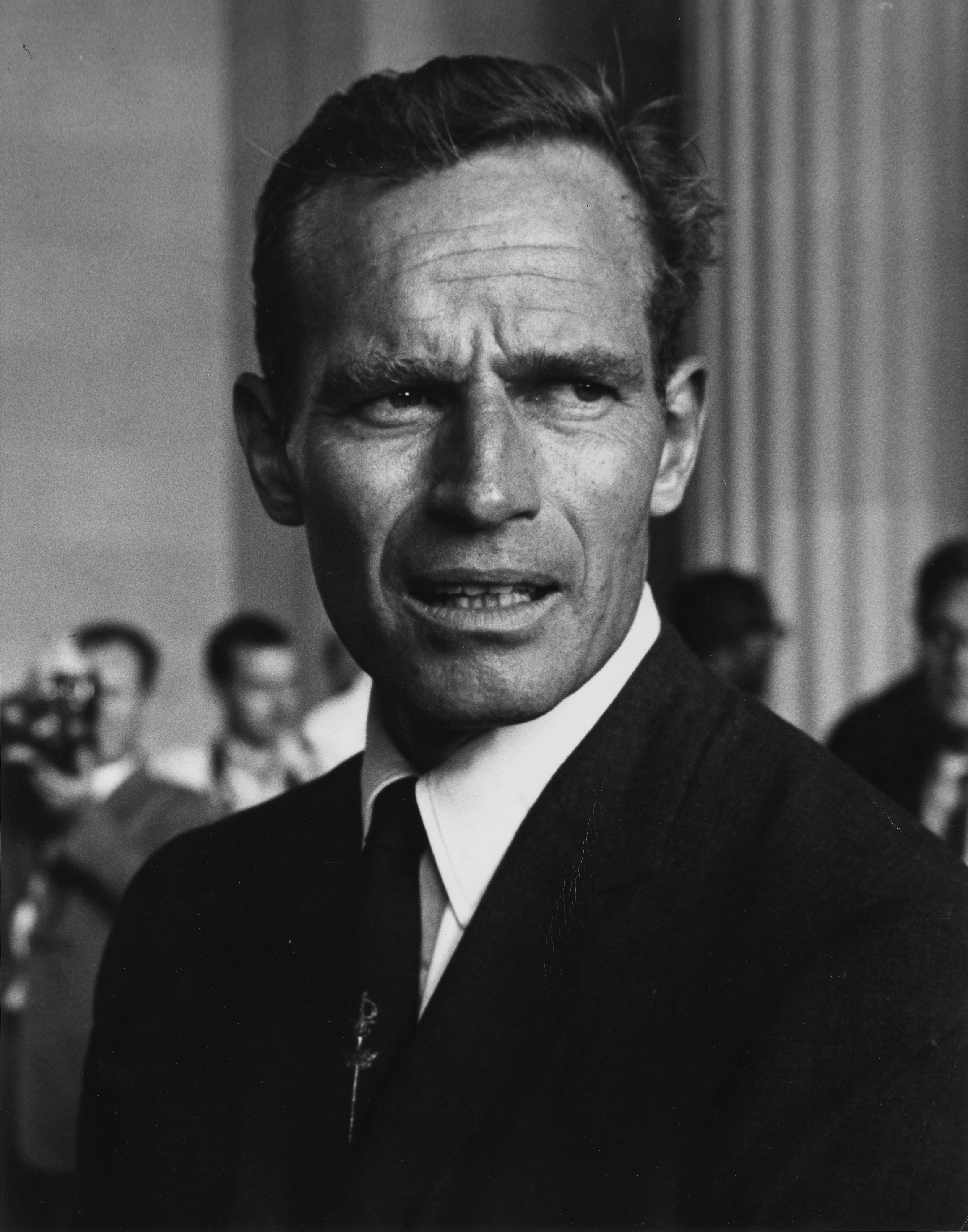
Charlton Heston won for Ben-Hur (1959).

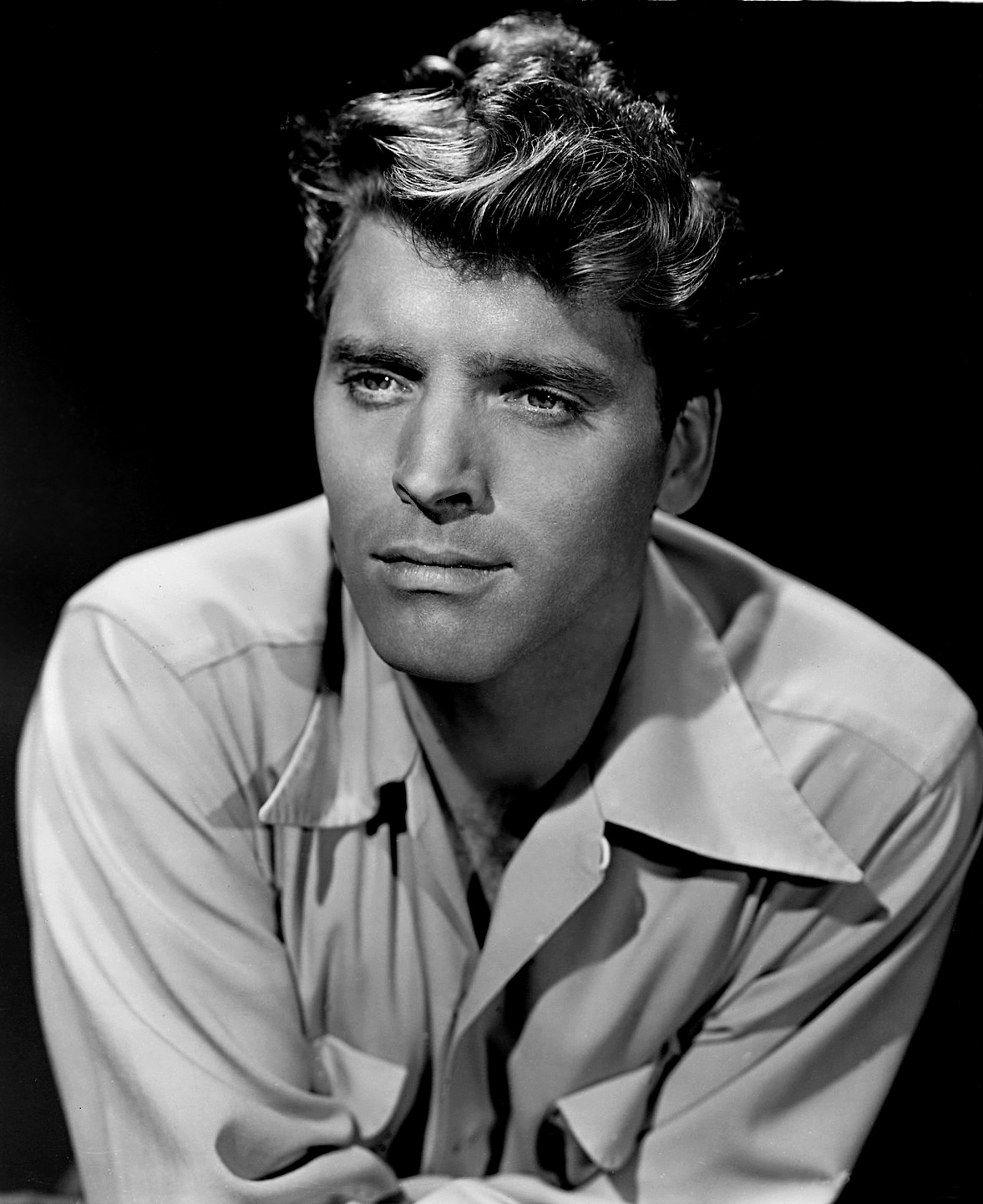
Burt Lancaster won for Elmer Gantry (1960).

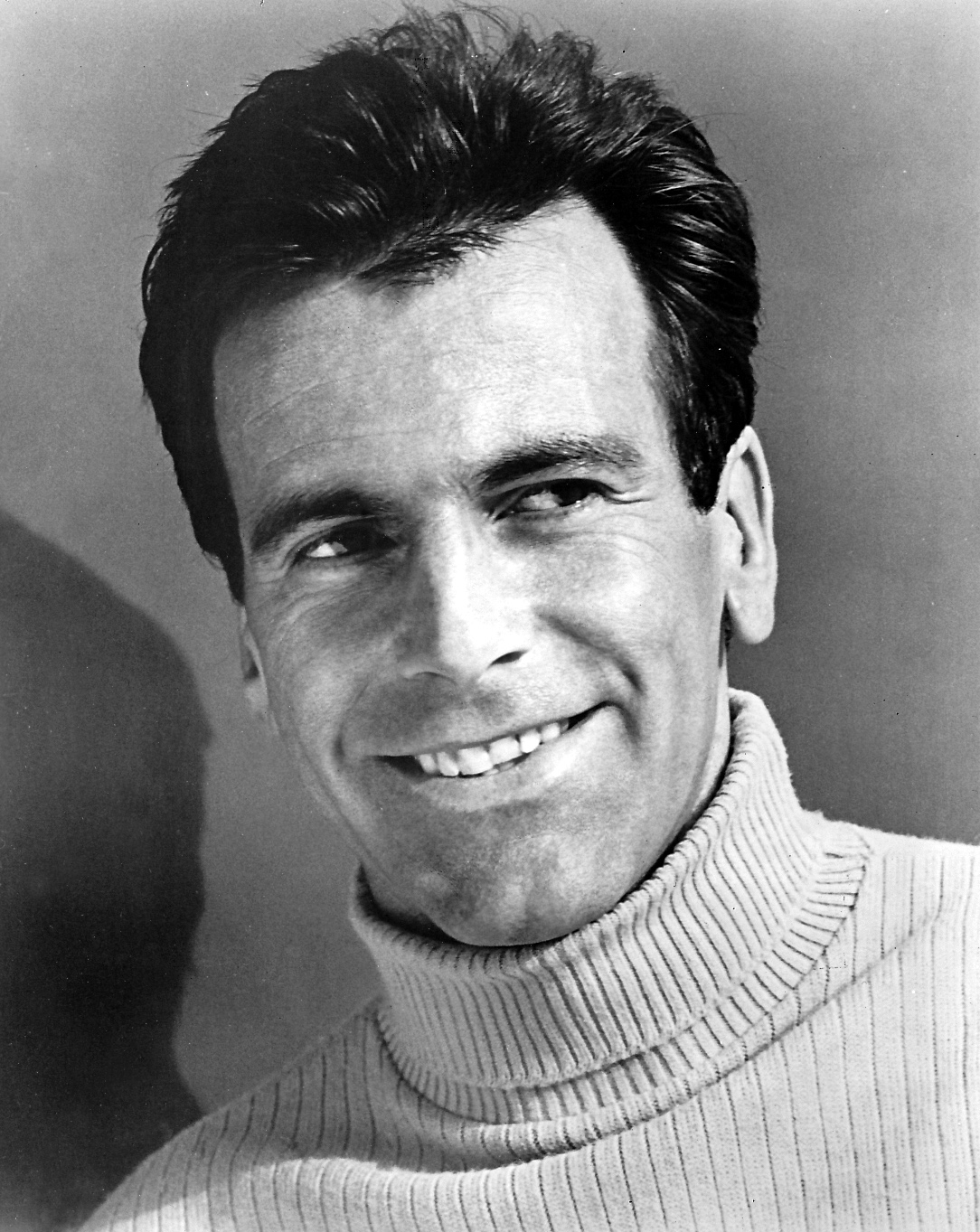
Maximilian Schell won for Judgment at Nuremberg (1961).

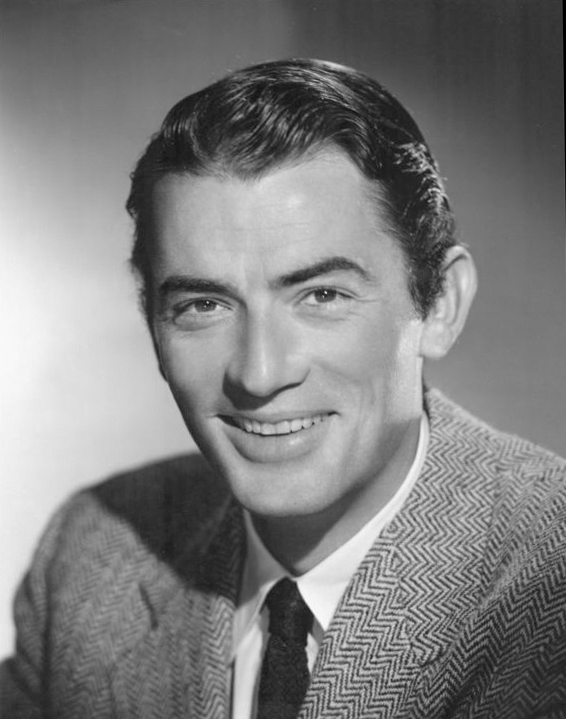
Gregory Peck won for To Kill a Mockingbird (1962).

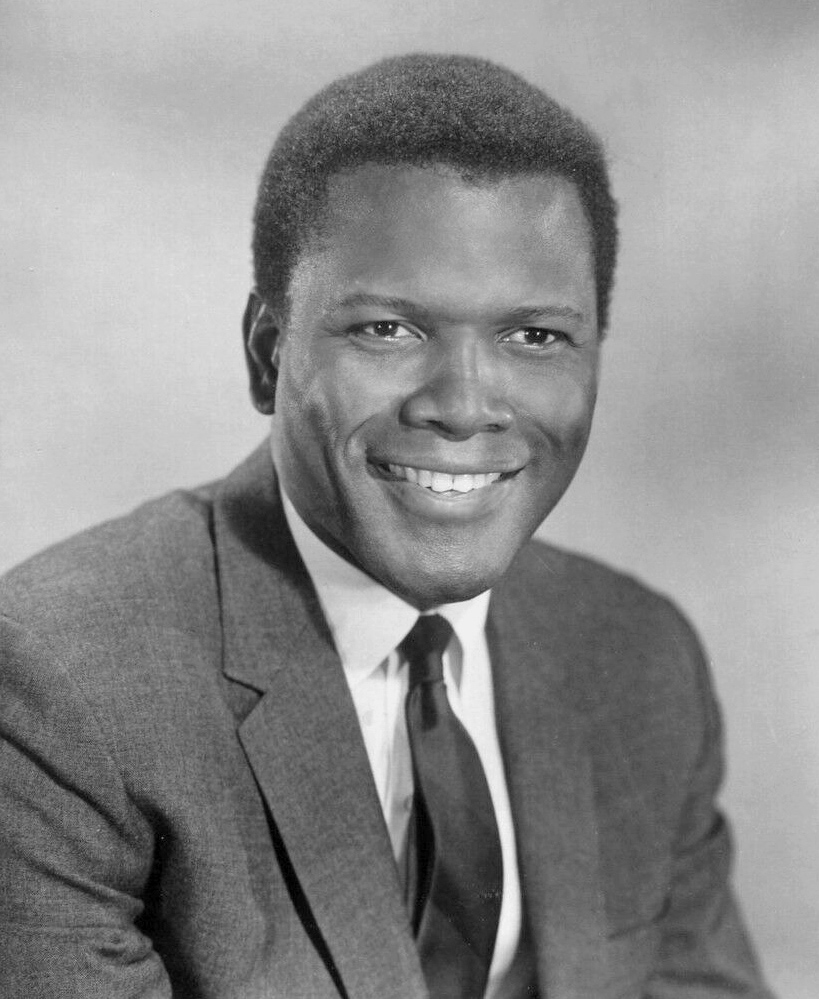
Sidney Poitier won for Lilies of the Field (1963); first black actor to win.

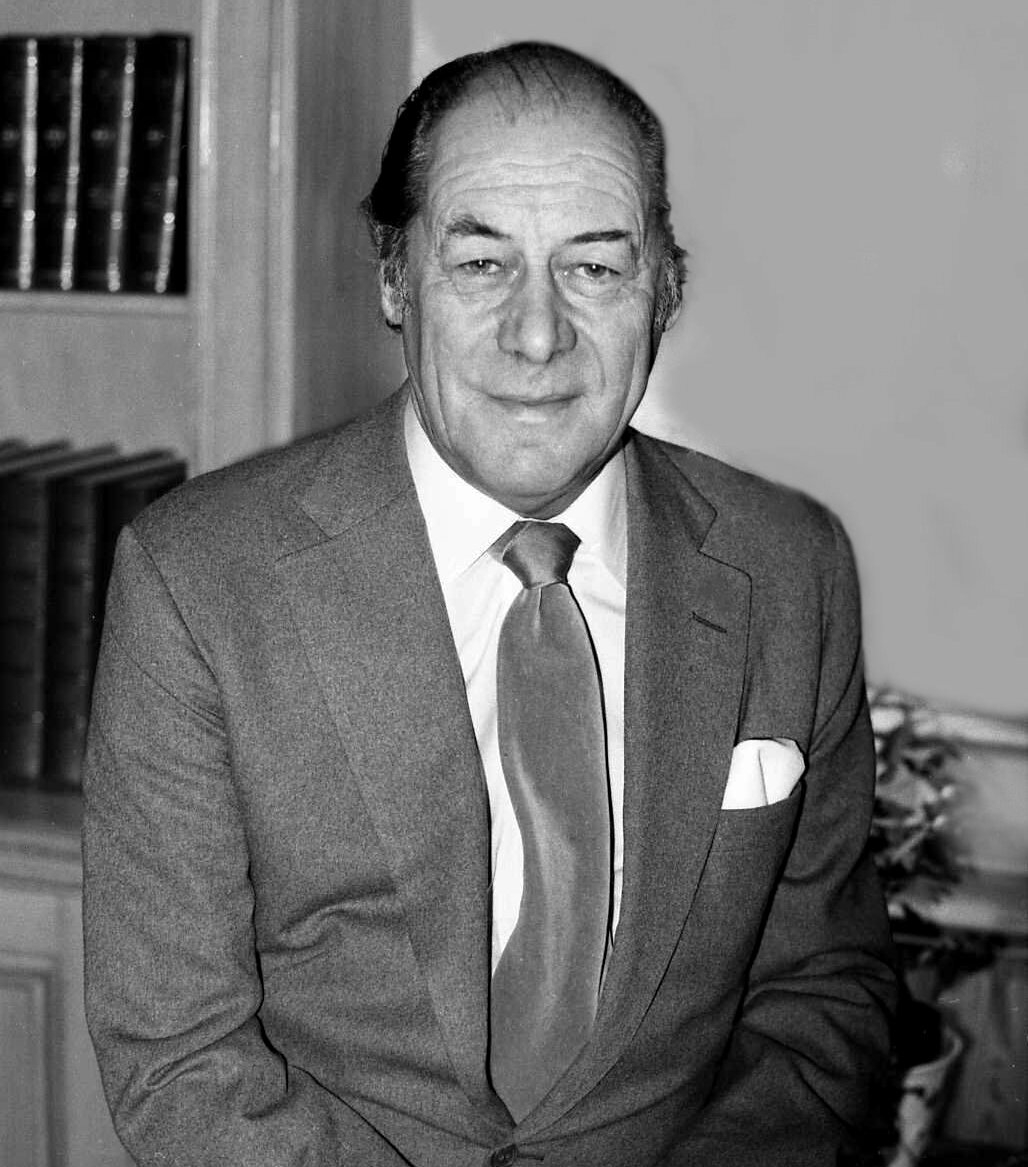
Rex Harrison won for My Fair Lady (1964).

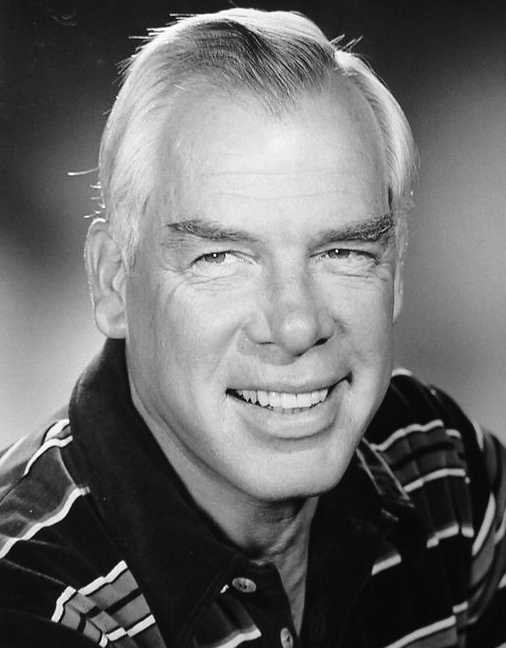
Lee Marvin won for playing dual roles in Cat Ballou (1965).

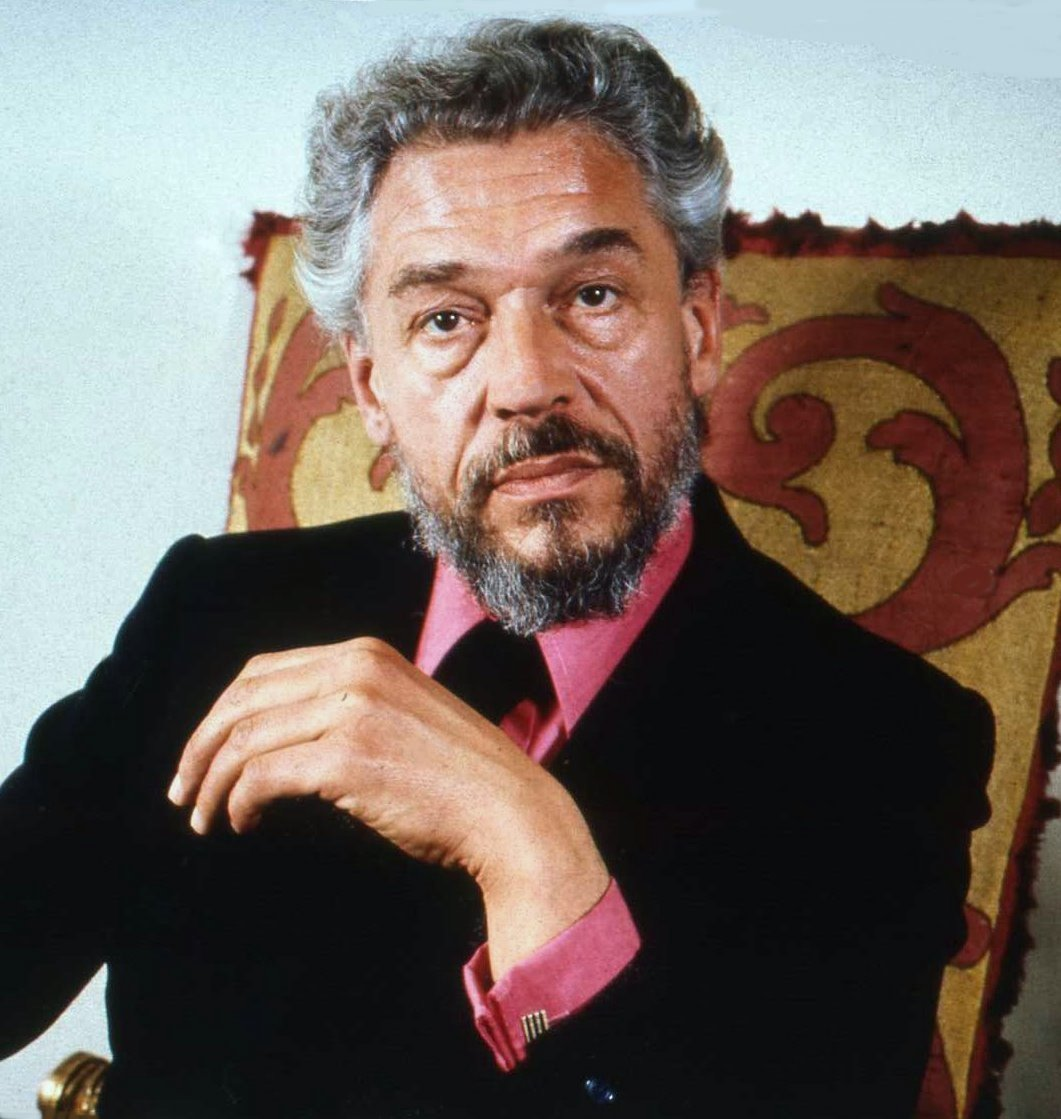
Paul Scofield won for A Man for All Seasons (1966).

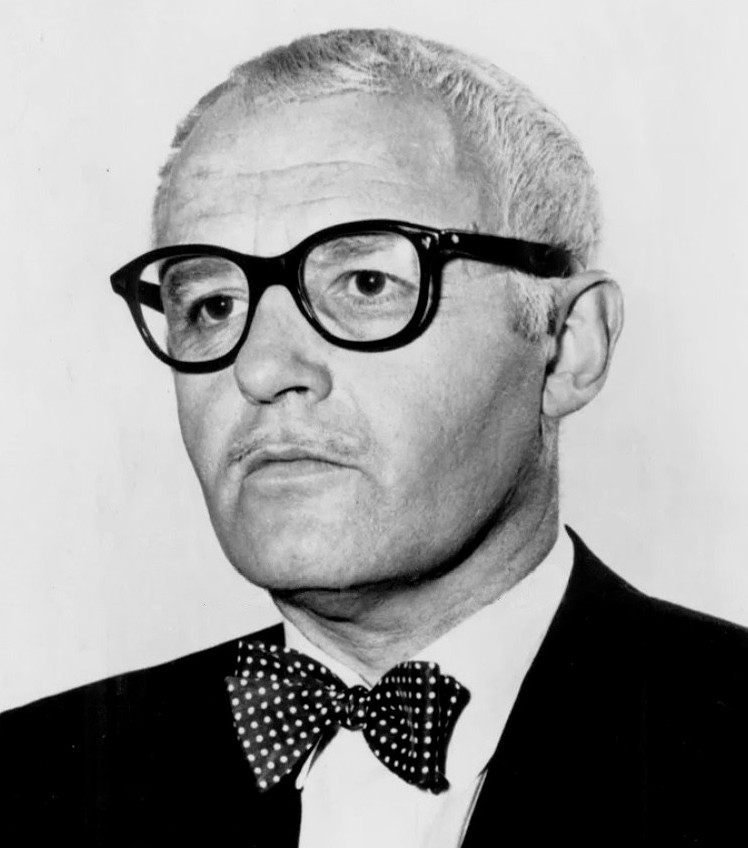
Rod Steiger won for In the Heat of the Night (1967).

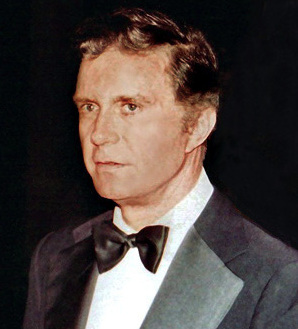
Cliff Robertson won for CHAЯLY (1968).

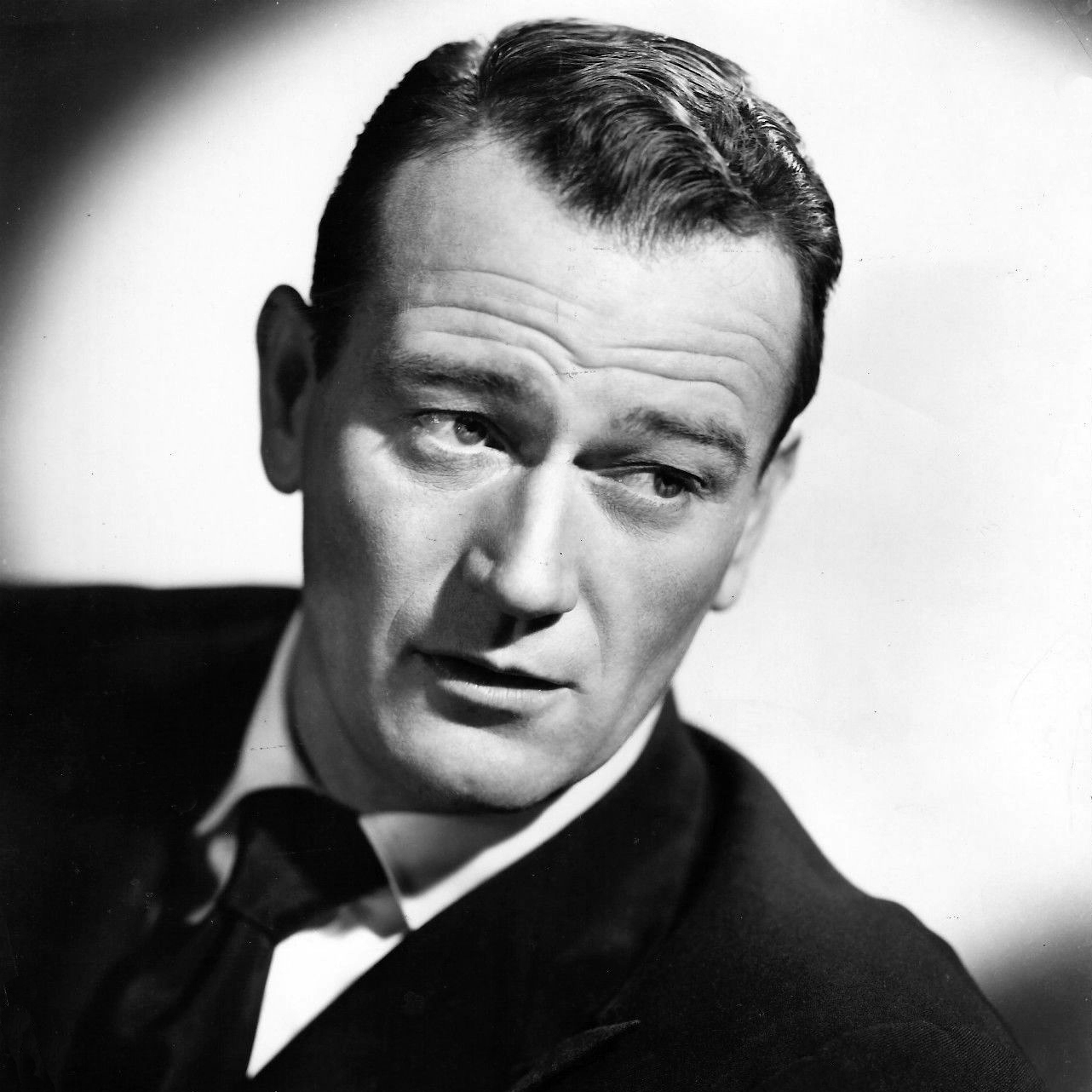
John Wayne won for True Grit (1969).

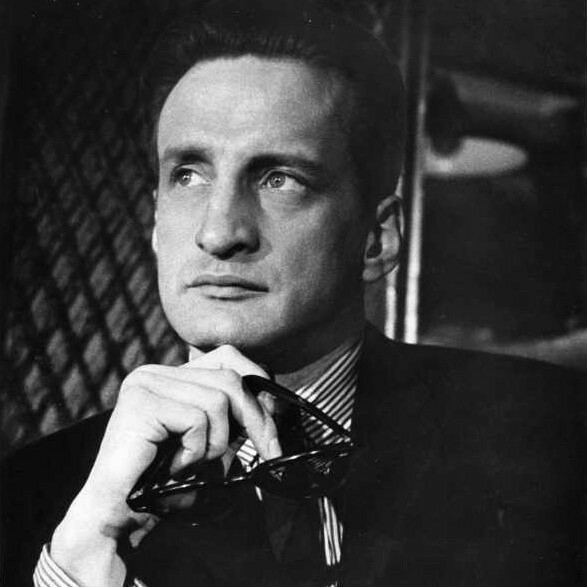
George C. Scott won for Patton (1970).

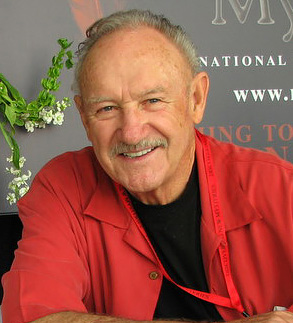
Gene Hackman won for The French Connection (1971).

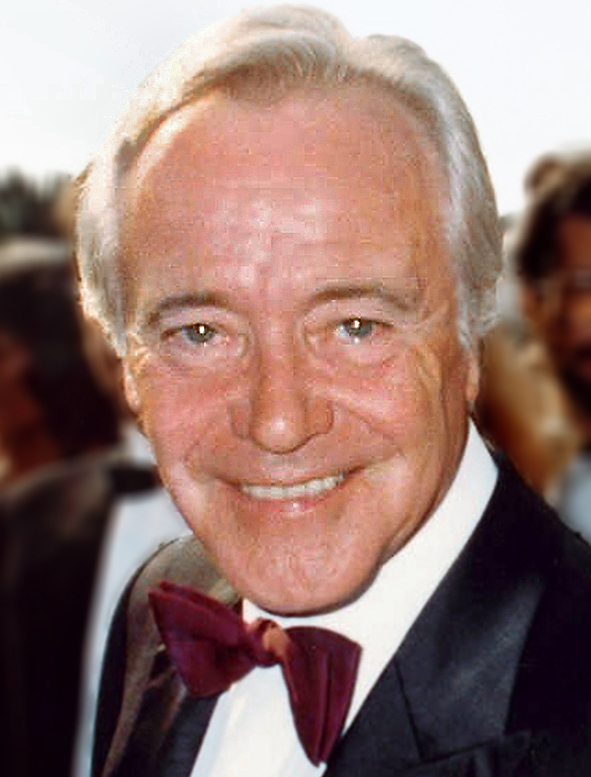
Jack Lemmon won for Save the Tiger (1973).

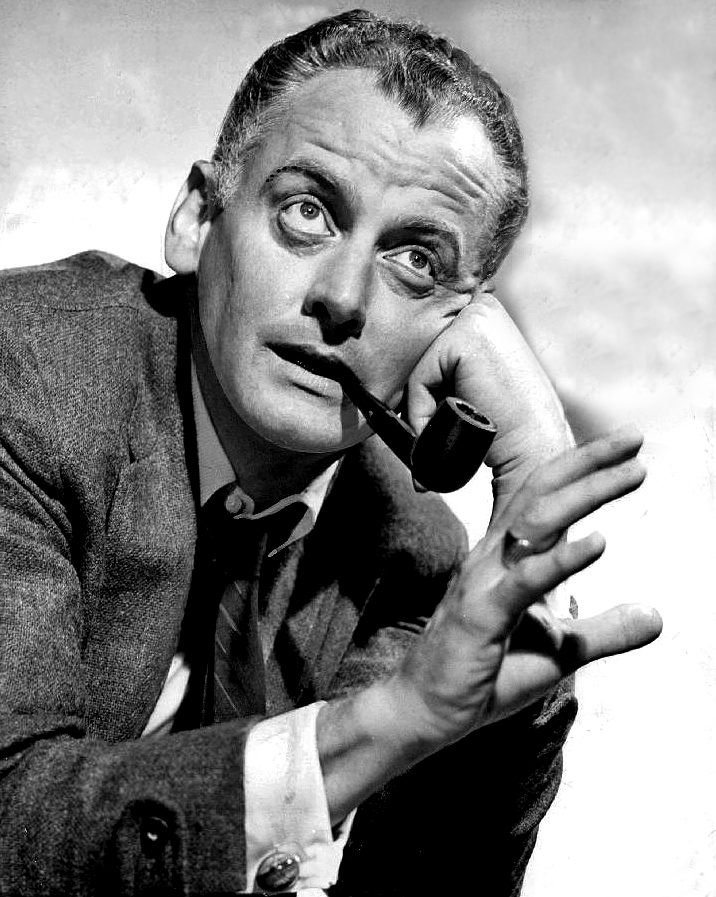
Art Carney won for Harry and Tonto (1974).

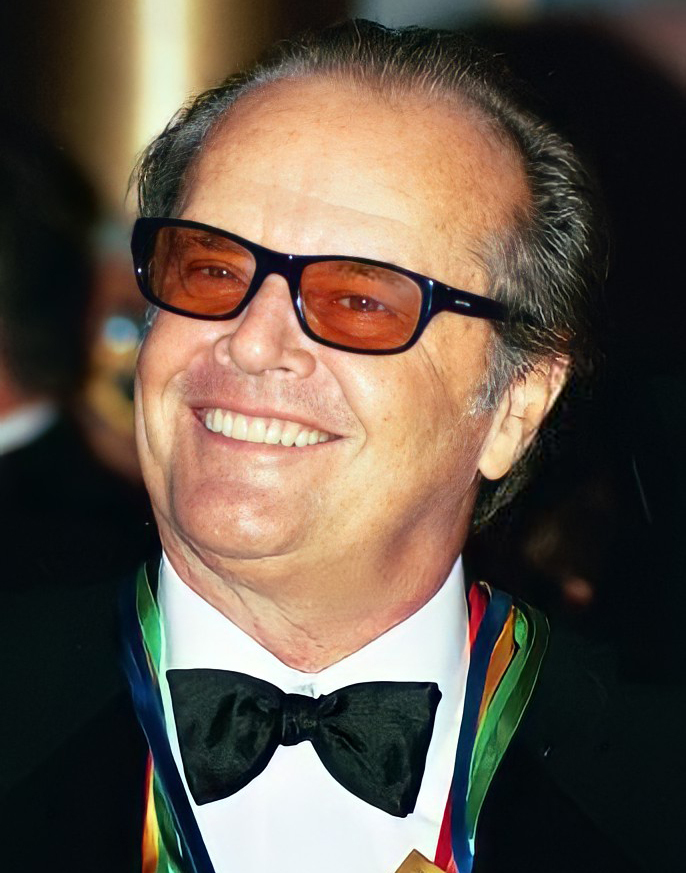
Jack Nicholson won twice, for One Flew Over the Cuckoo's Nest (1975) and As Good as It Gets (1997).

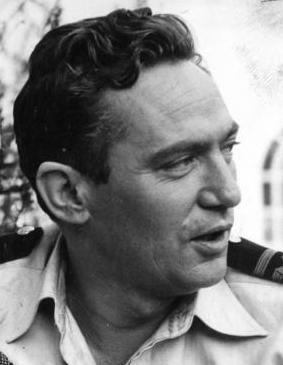
Peter Finch won for Network (1976); first actor to win posthumously.

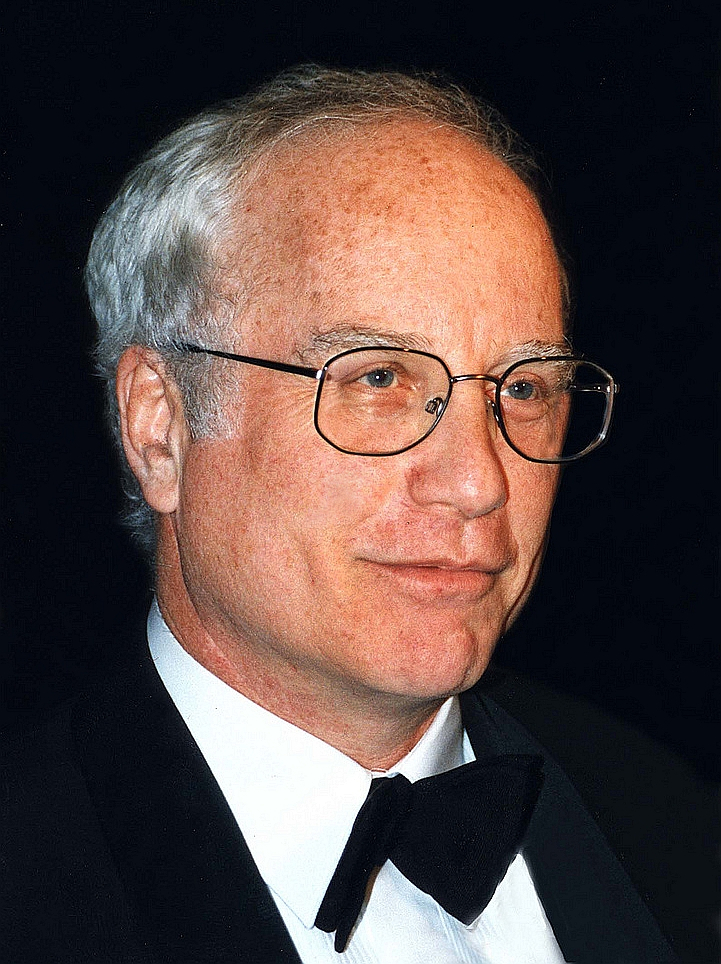
Richard Dreyfuss won for The Goodbye Girl (1977).

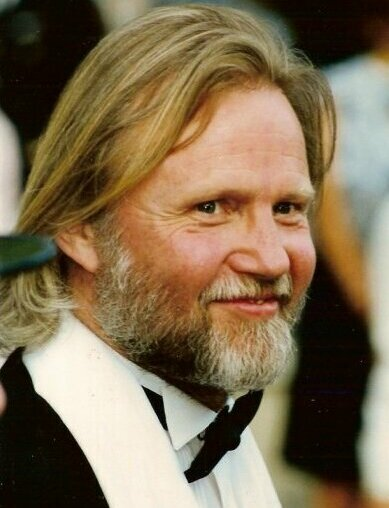
Jon Voight won for Coming Home (1978).

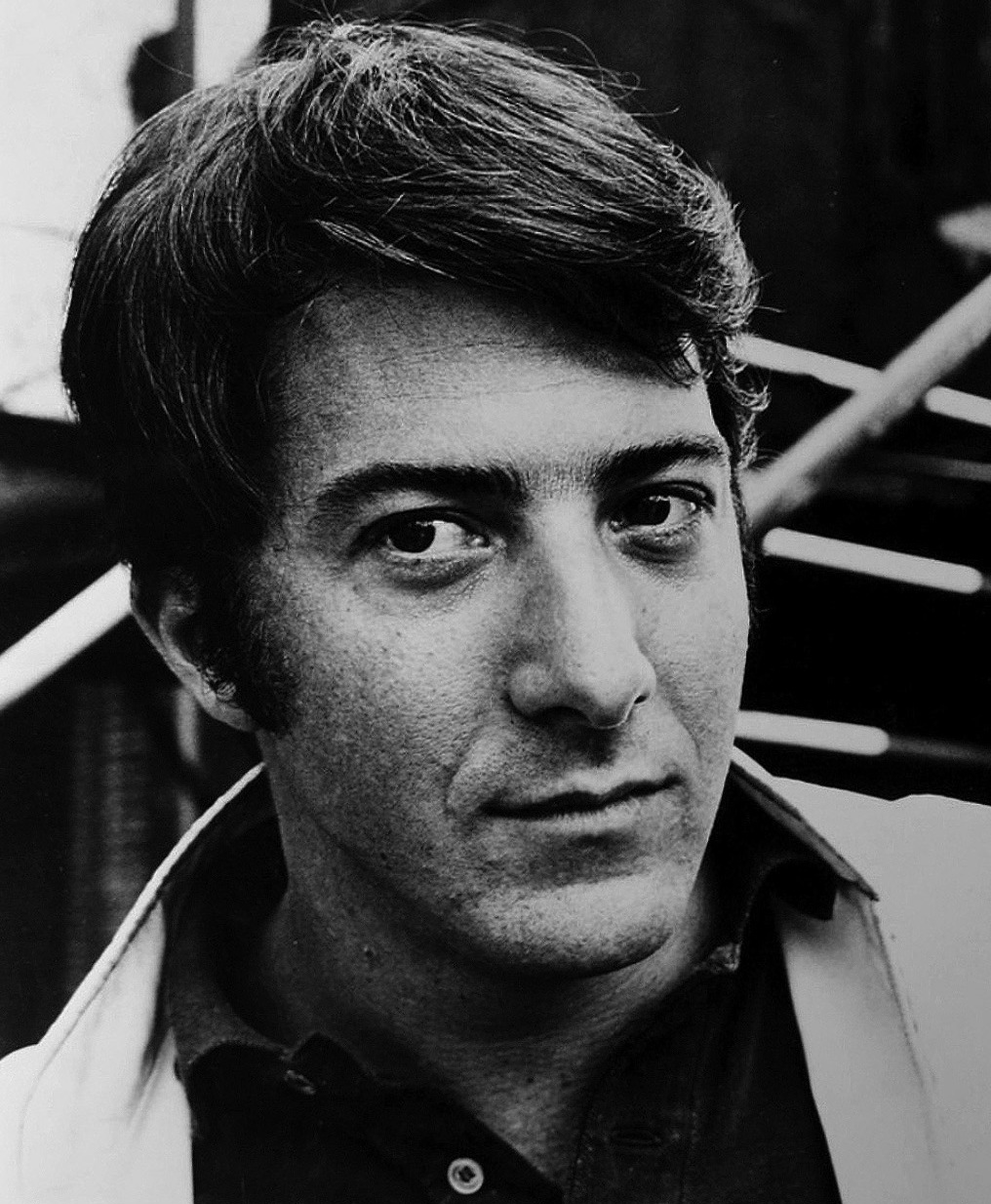
Dustin Hoffman won twice, for Kramer vs. Kramer (1979) and Rain Man (1988).

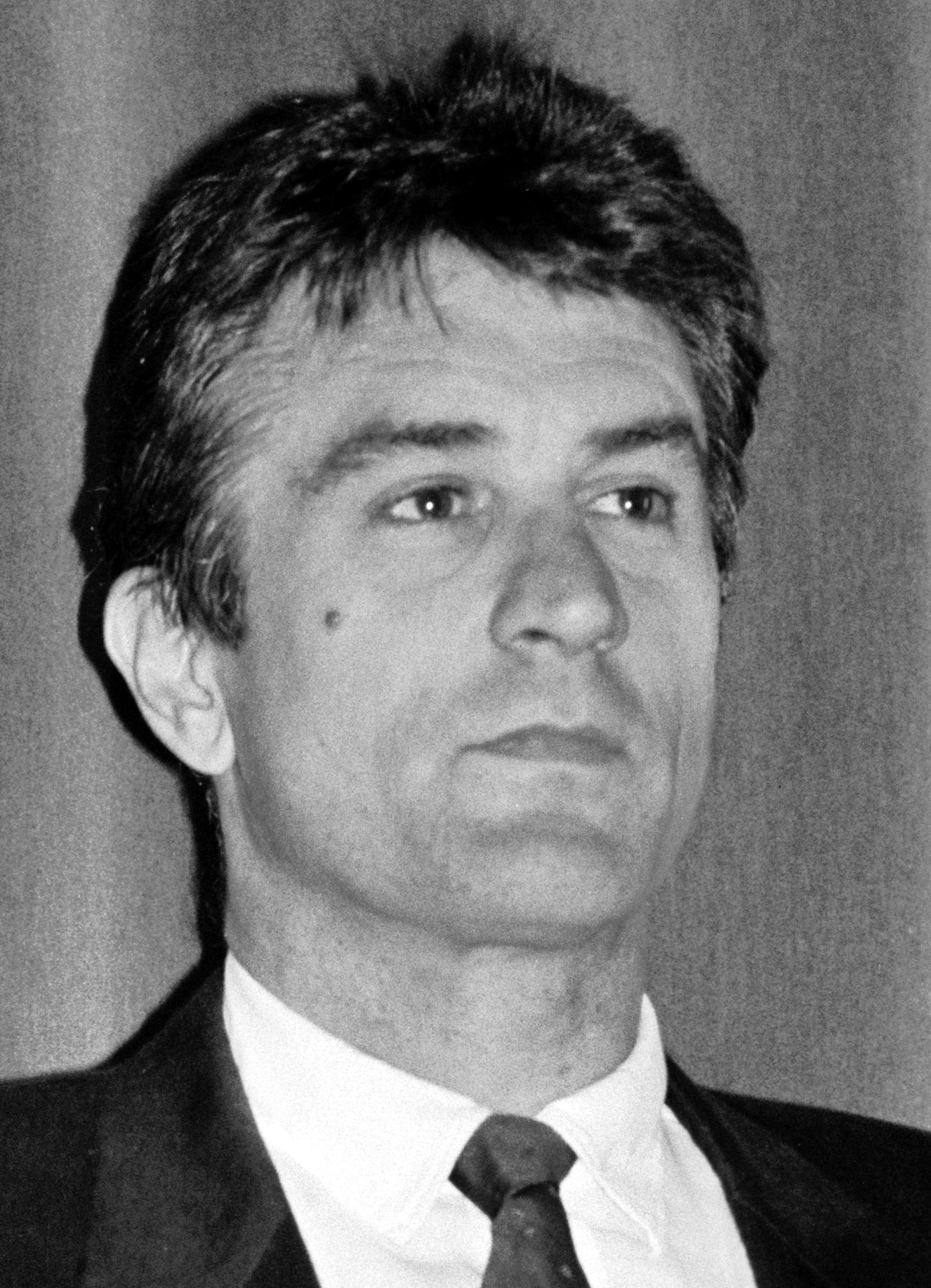
Robert De Niro won for Raging Bull (1980).

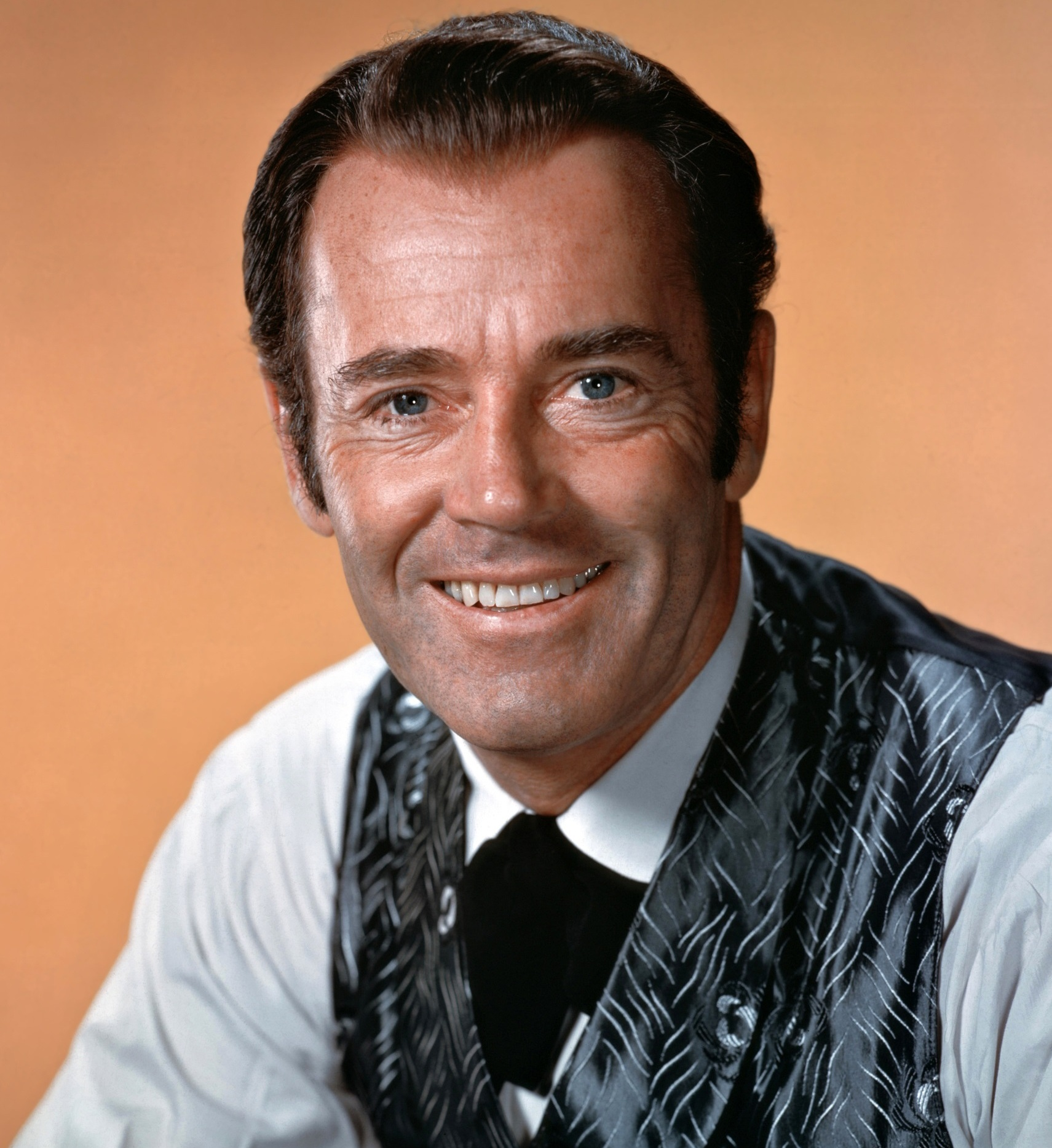
Henry Fonda won for On Golden Pond (1981)

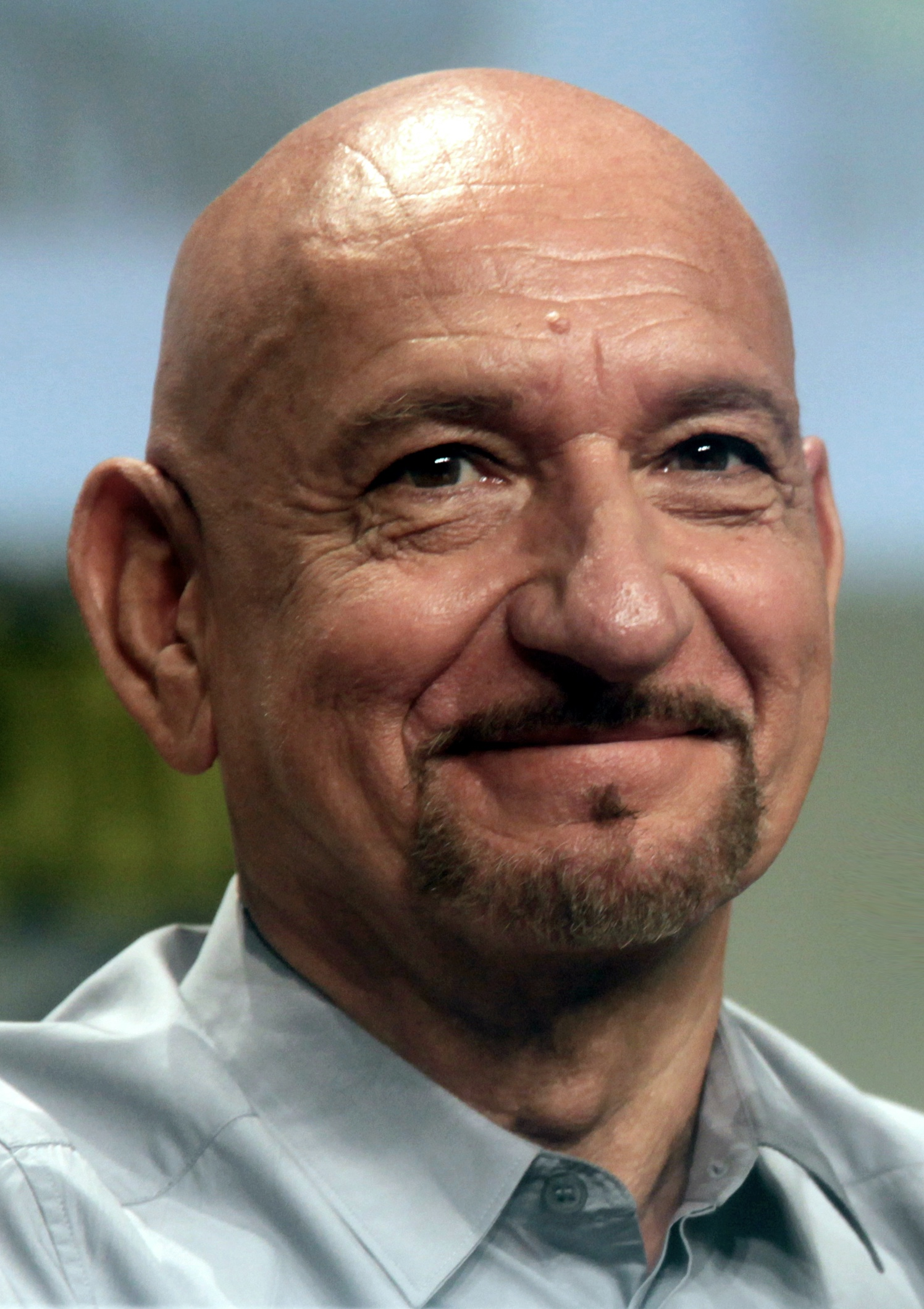
Ben Kingsley won for Gandhi (1982).

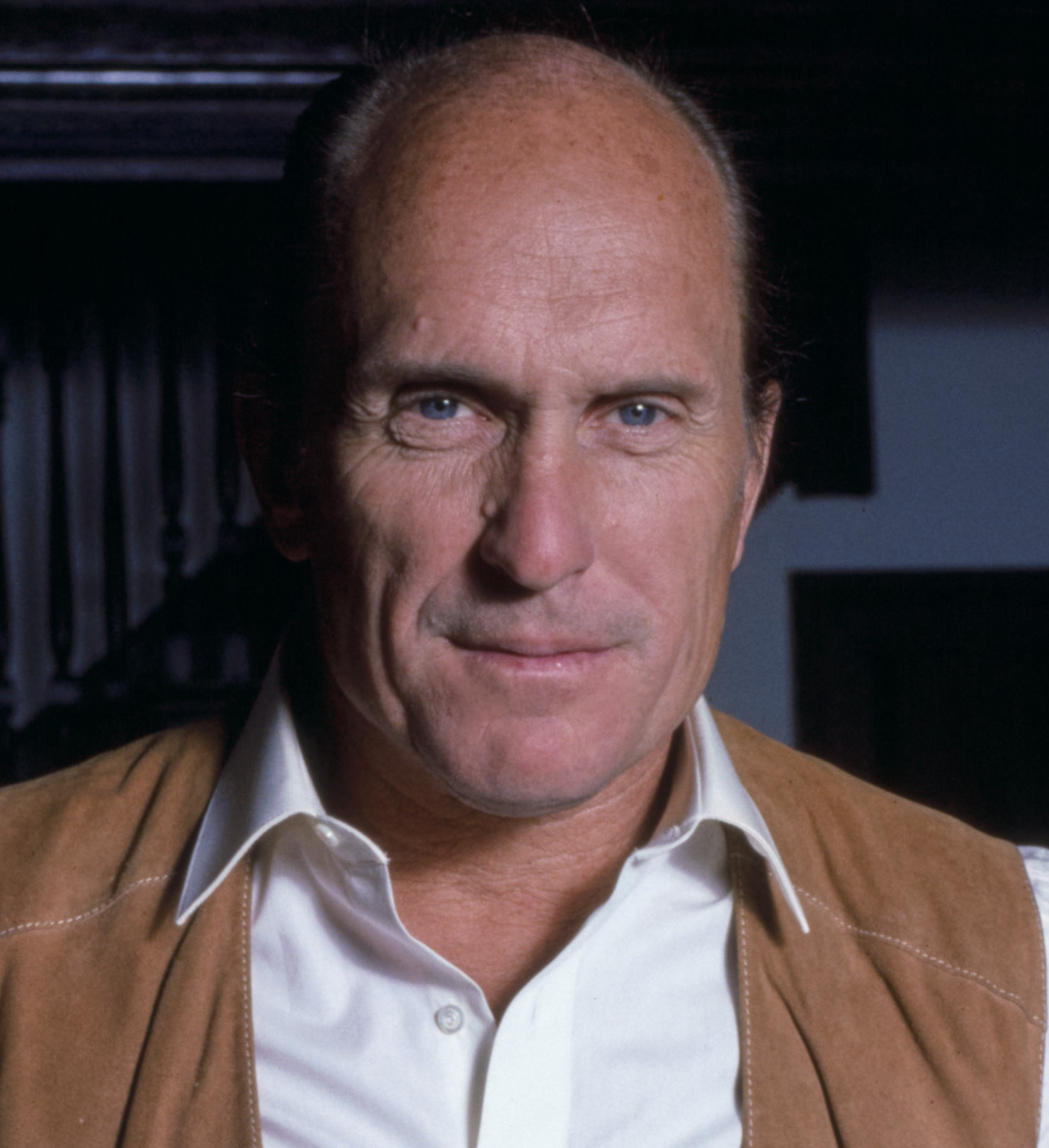
Robert Duvall won for Tender Mercies (1983).

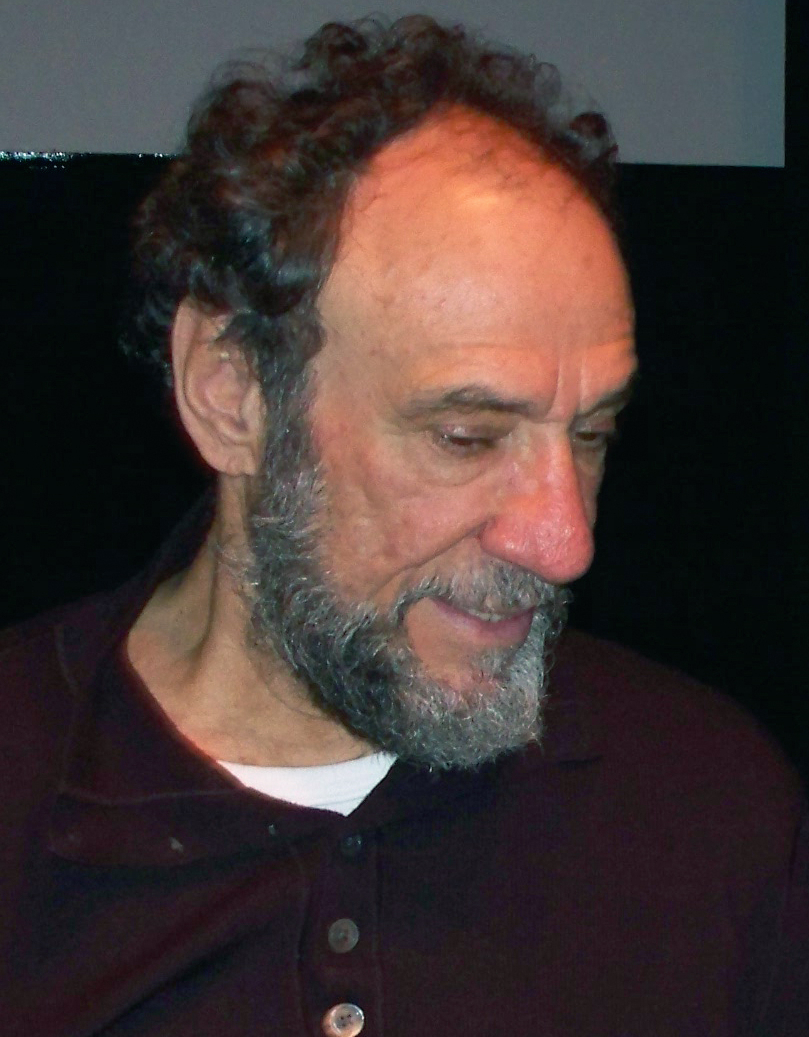
F. Murray Abraham won for Amadeus (1984).

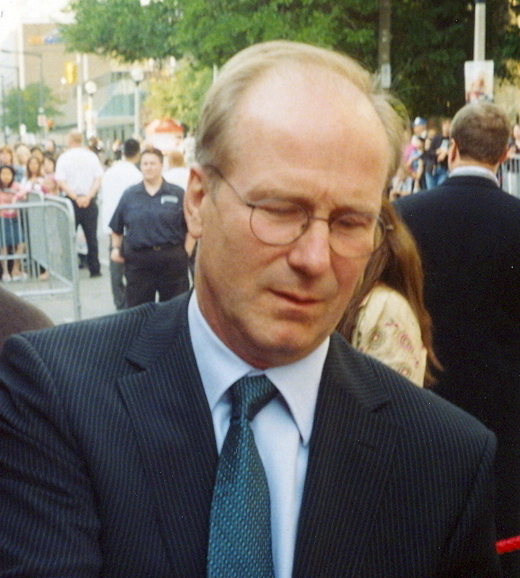
William Hurt won for Kiss of the Spider Woman (1985).

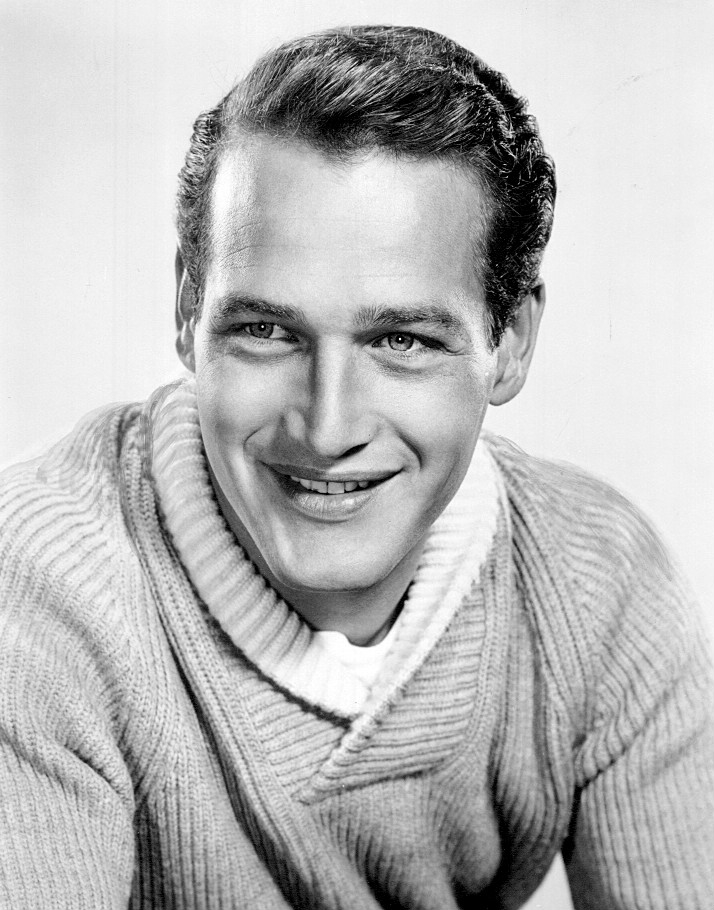
Paul Newman won for The Color of Money (1986).

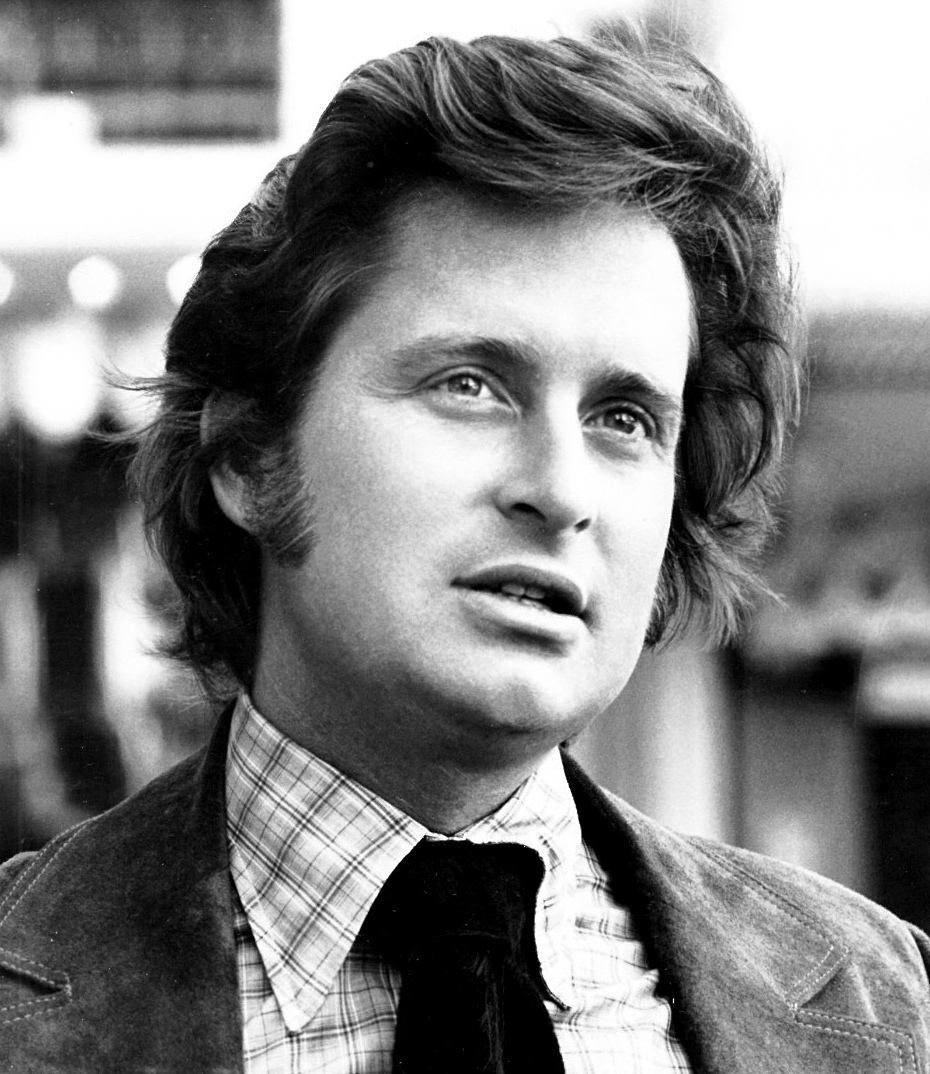
Michael Douglas won for Wall Street (1987).

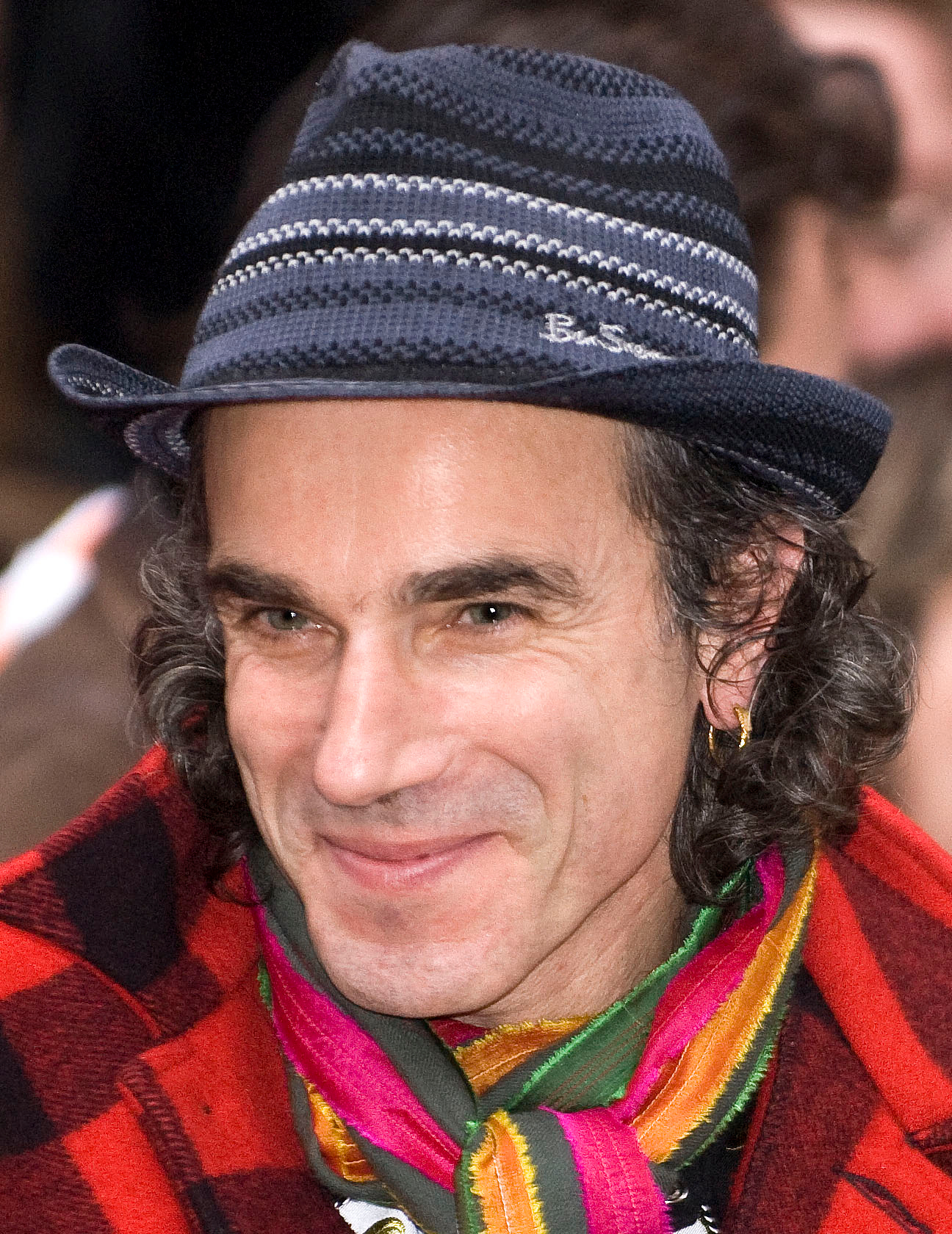
Daniel Day-Lewis won thrice, for My Left Foot (1989), There Will Be Blood (2007), and Lincoln (2012).

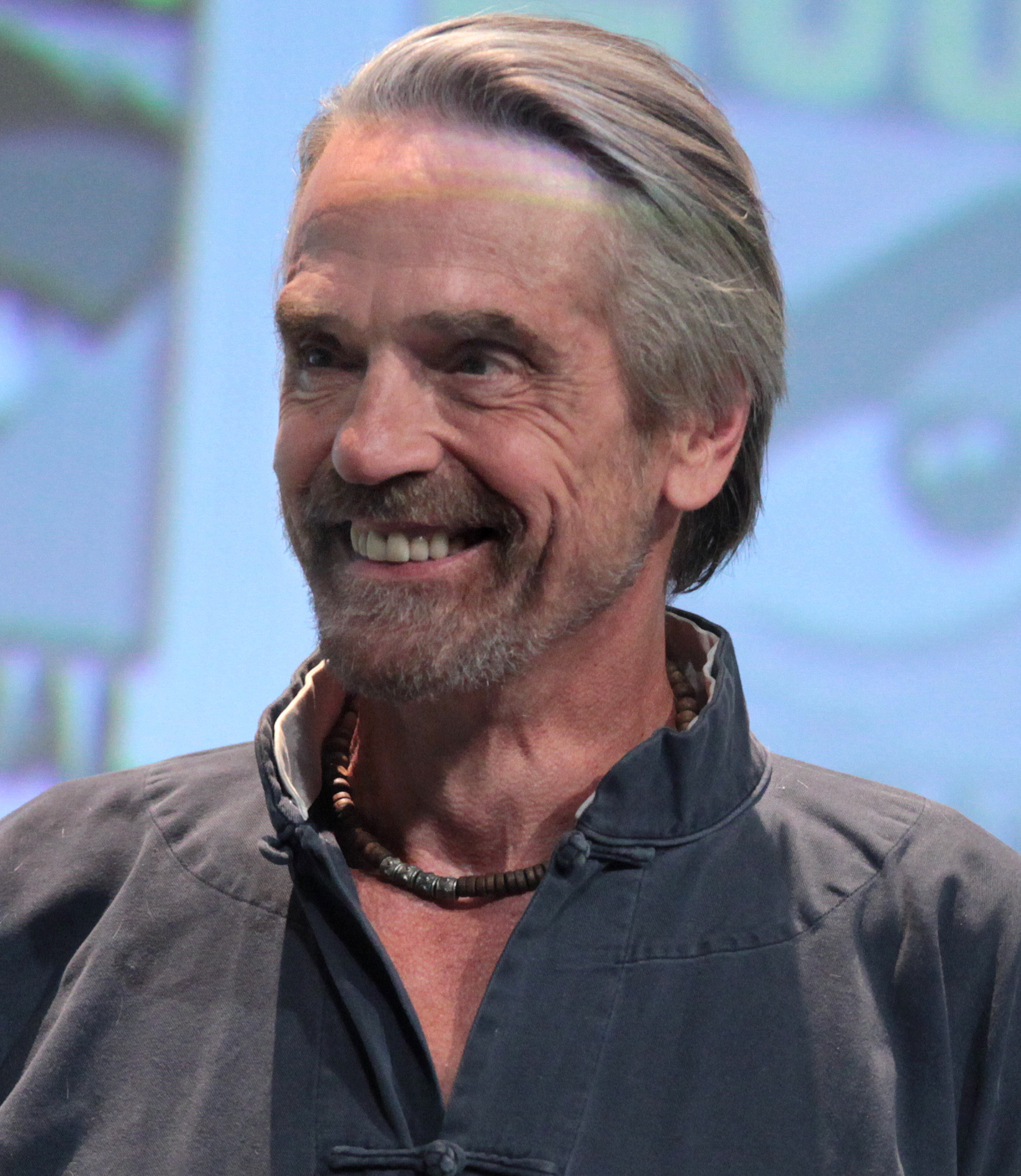
Jeremy Irons won for Reversal of Fortune (1990).

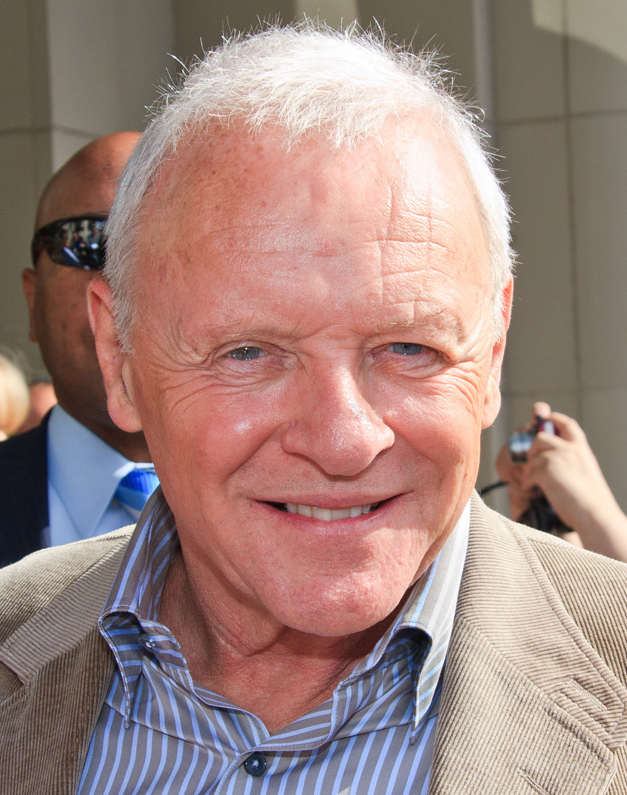
Anthony Hopkins won twice, for The Silence of the Lambs (1991) and The Father (2020)—the latter rendering him the overall oldest acting nominee in a leading role and the overall oldest acting winner, at age 83.

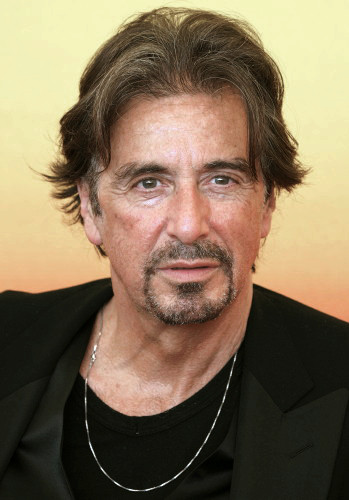
Al Pacino won for Scent of a Woman (1992).

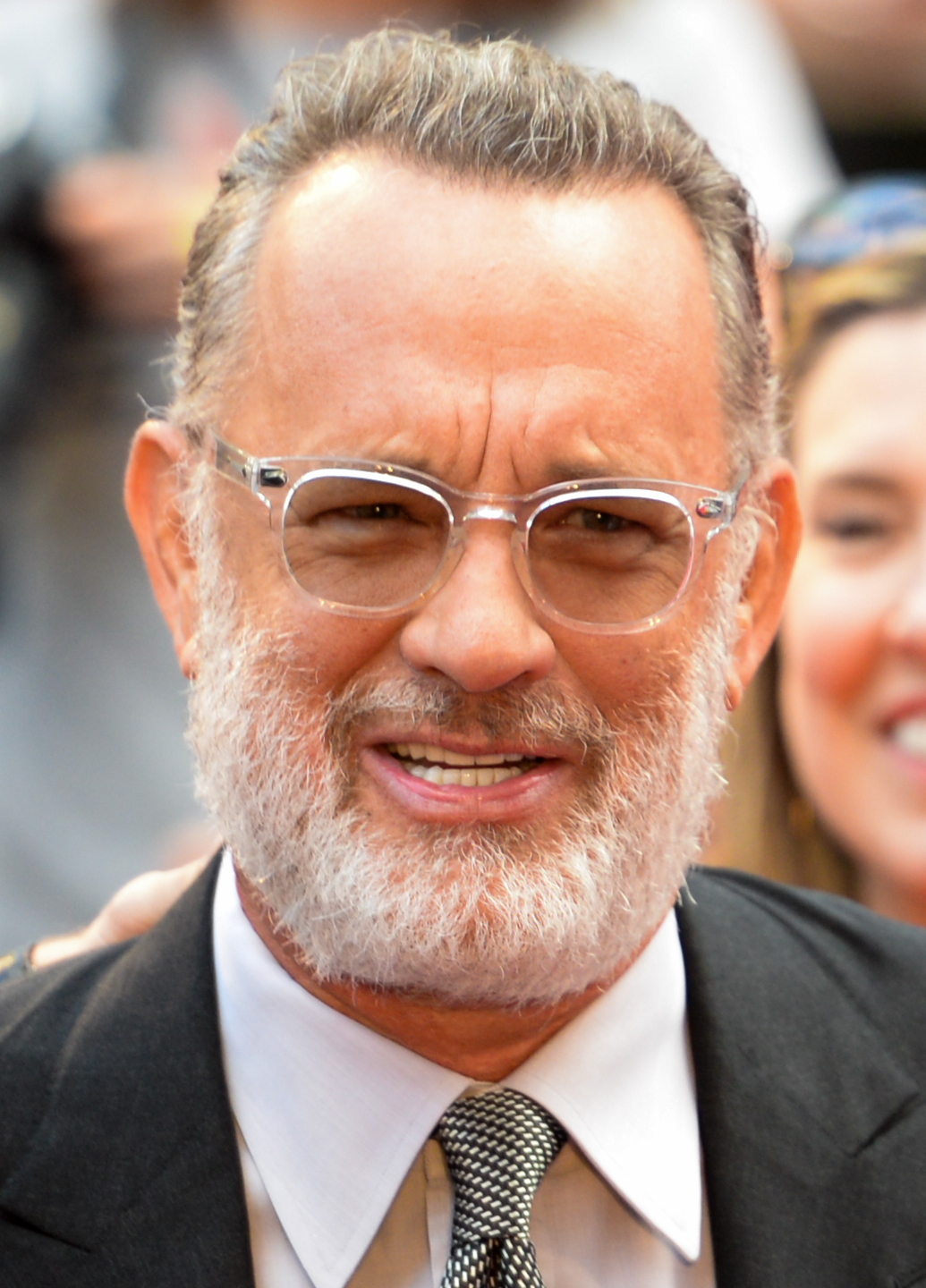
Tom Hanks won twice consecutively, for Philadelphia (1993) and Forrest Gump (1994).

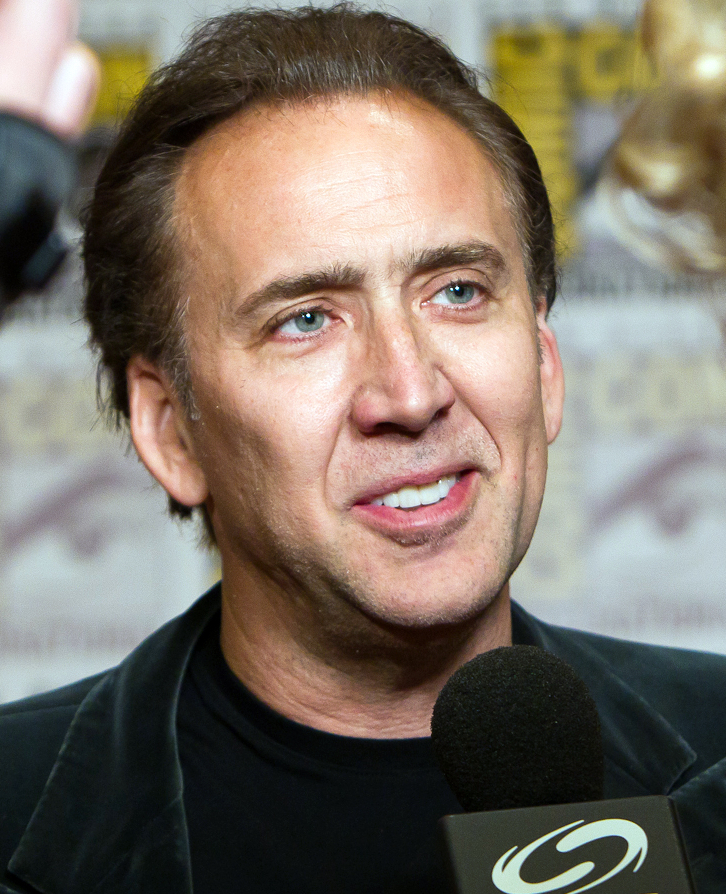
Nicolas Cage won for Leaving Las Vegas (1995).

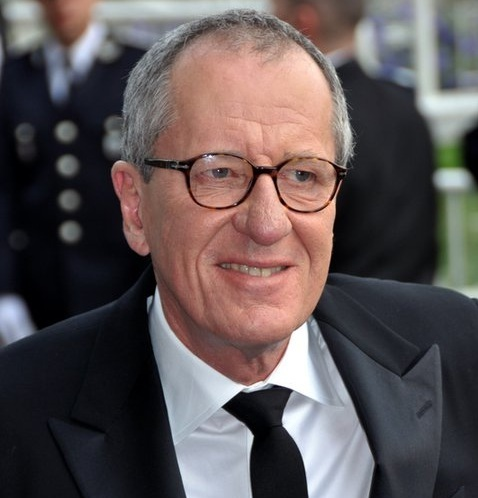
Geoffrey Rush won for Shine (1996).

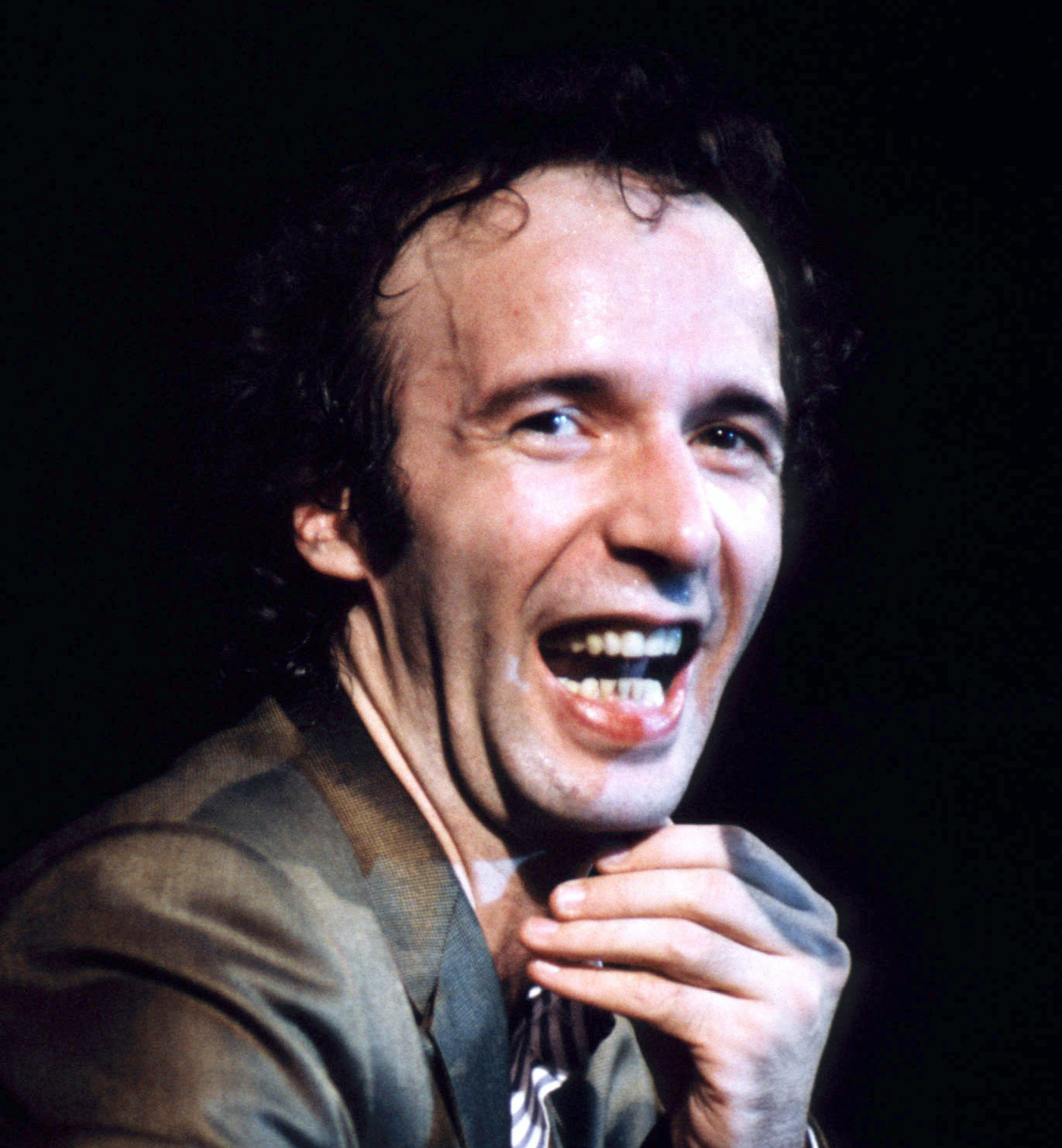
Roberto Benigni won for Life Is Beautiful (1997); first Italian-spoken role to win for the category.

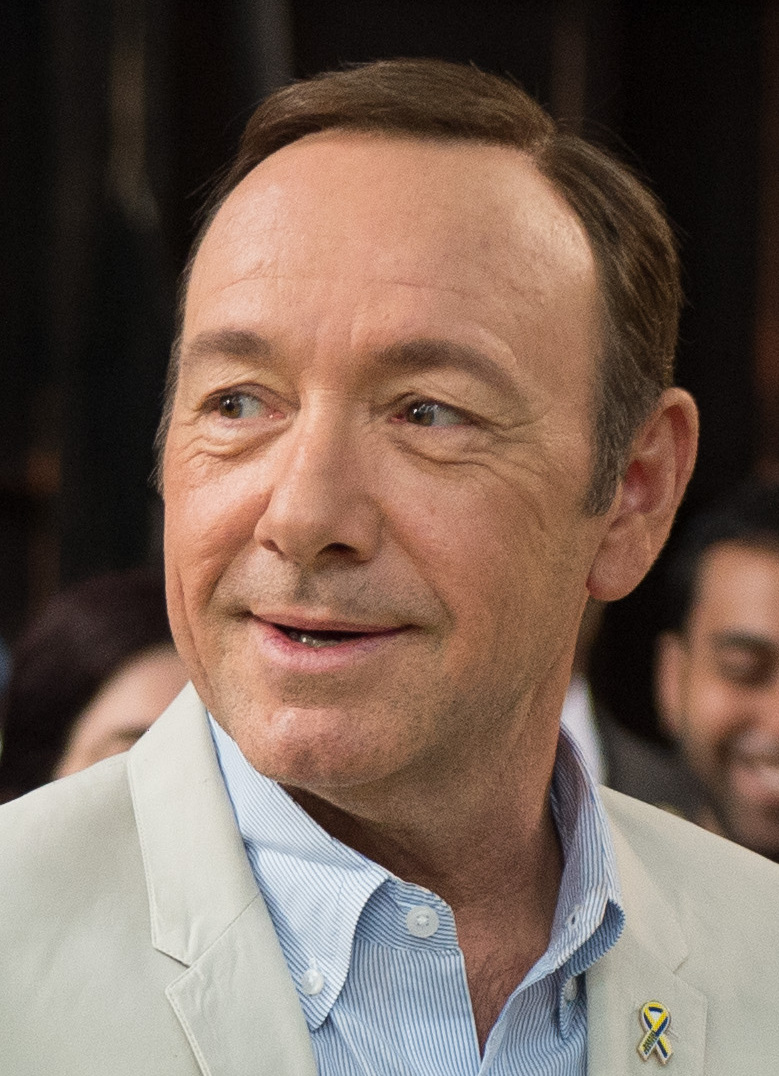
Kevin Spacey won for American Beauty (1999).

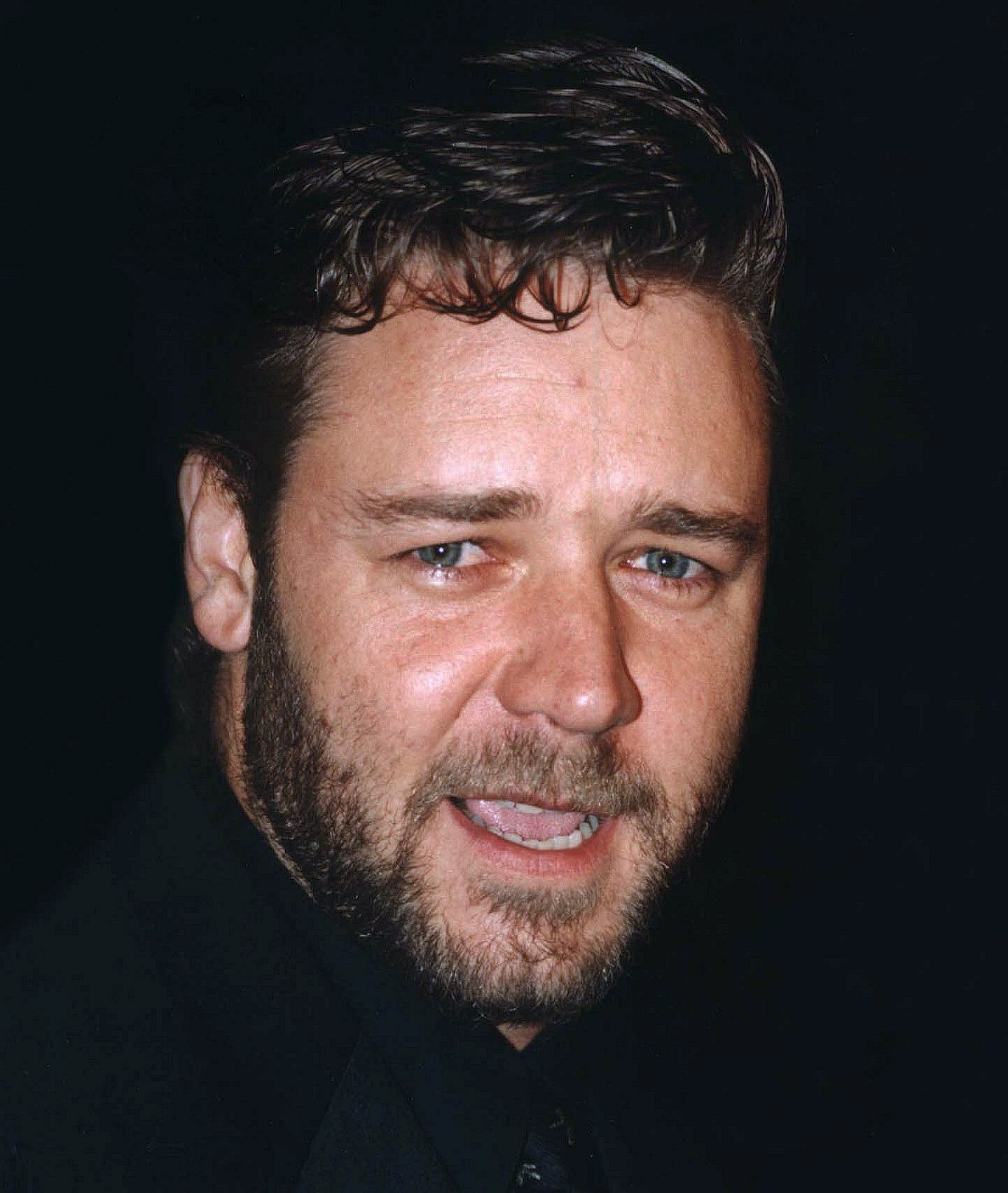
Russell Crowe won for Gladiator (2000).

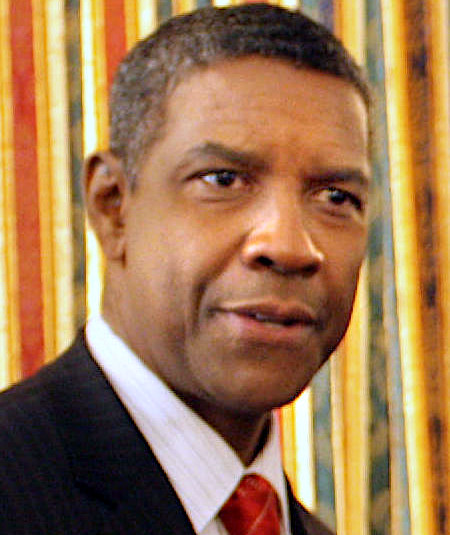
Denzel Washington won for Training Day (2001).

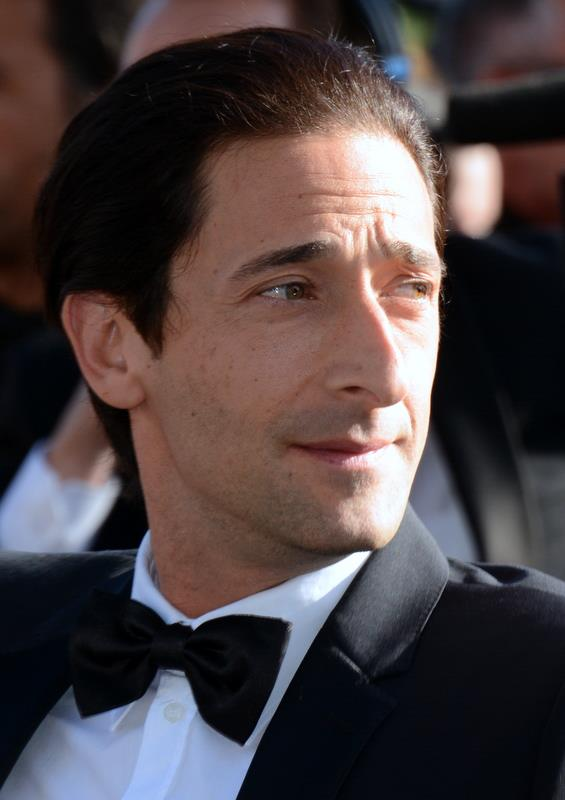
Adrien Brody won twice, for The Pianist (2002) and The Brutalist (2024).

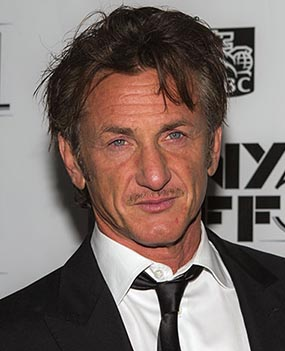
Sean Penn won twice, for Mystic River (2003), Milk (2008).

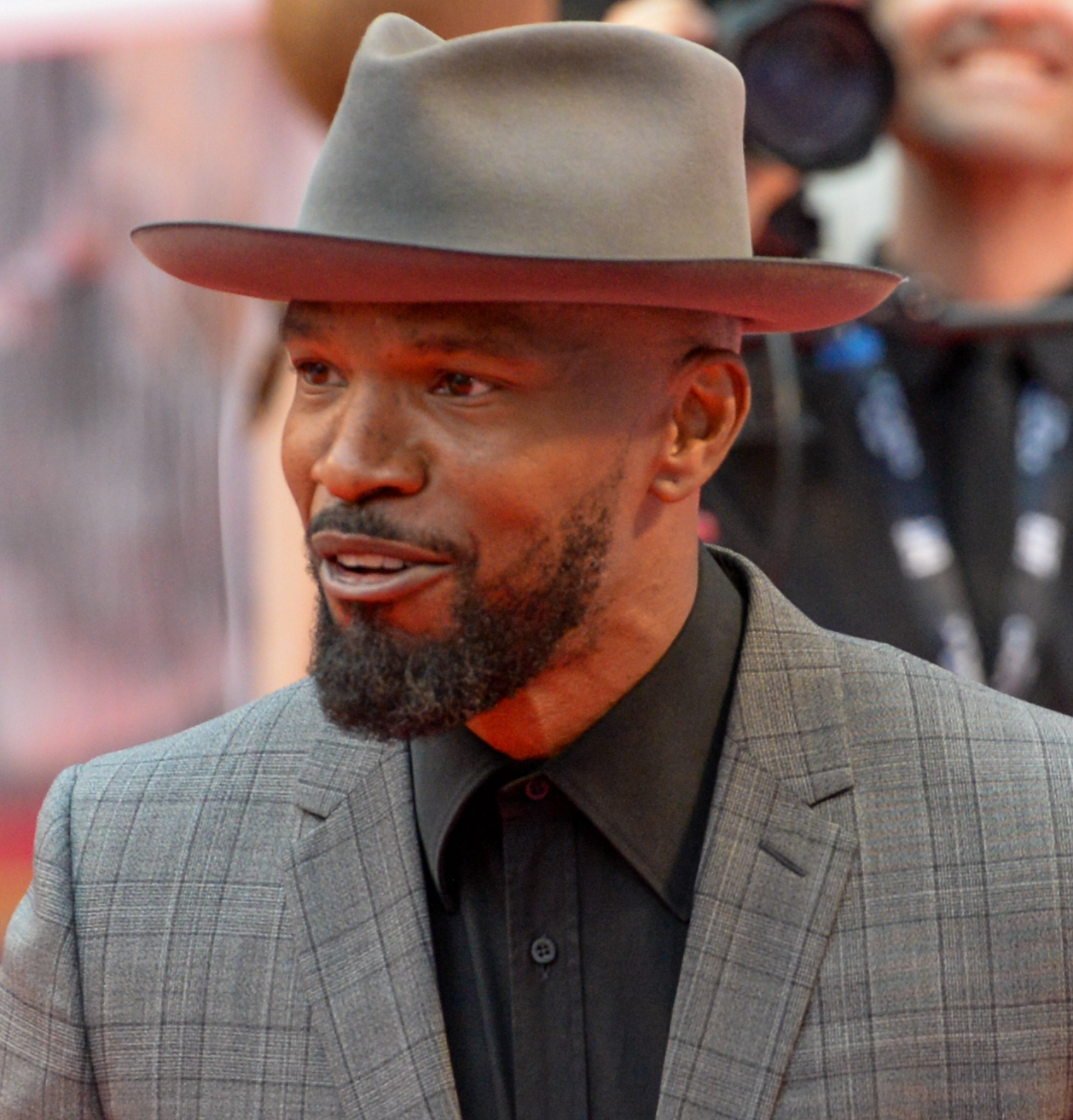
Jamie Foxx won for Ray (2004).

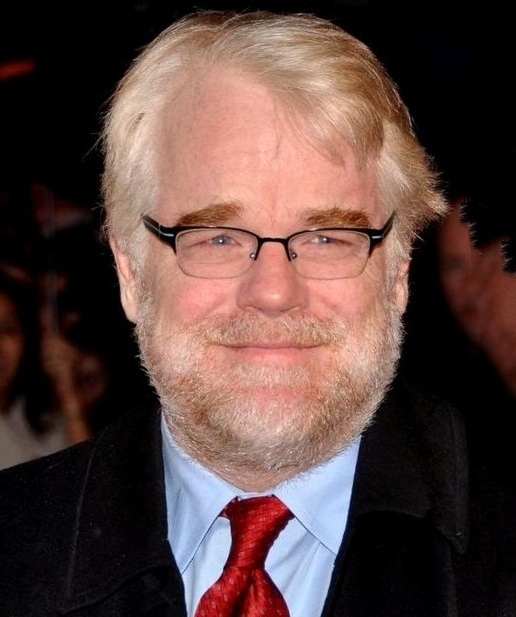
Philip Seymour Hoffman won for Capote (2005).

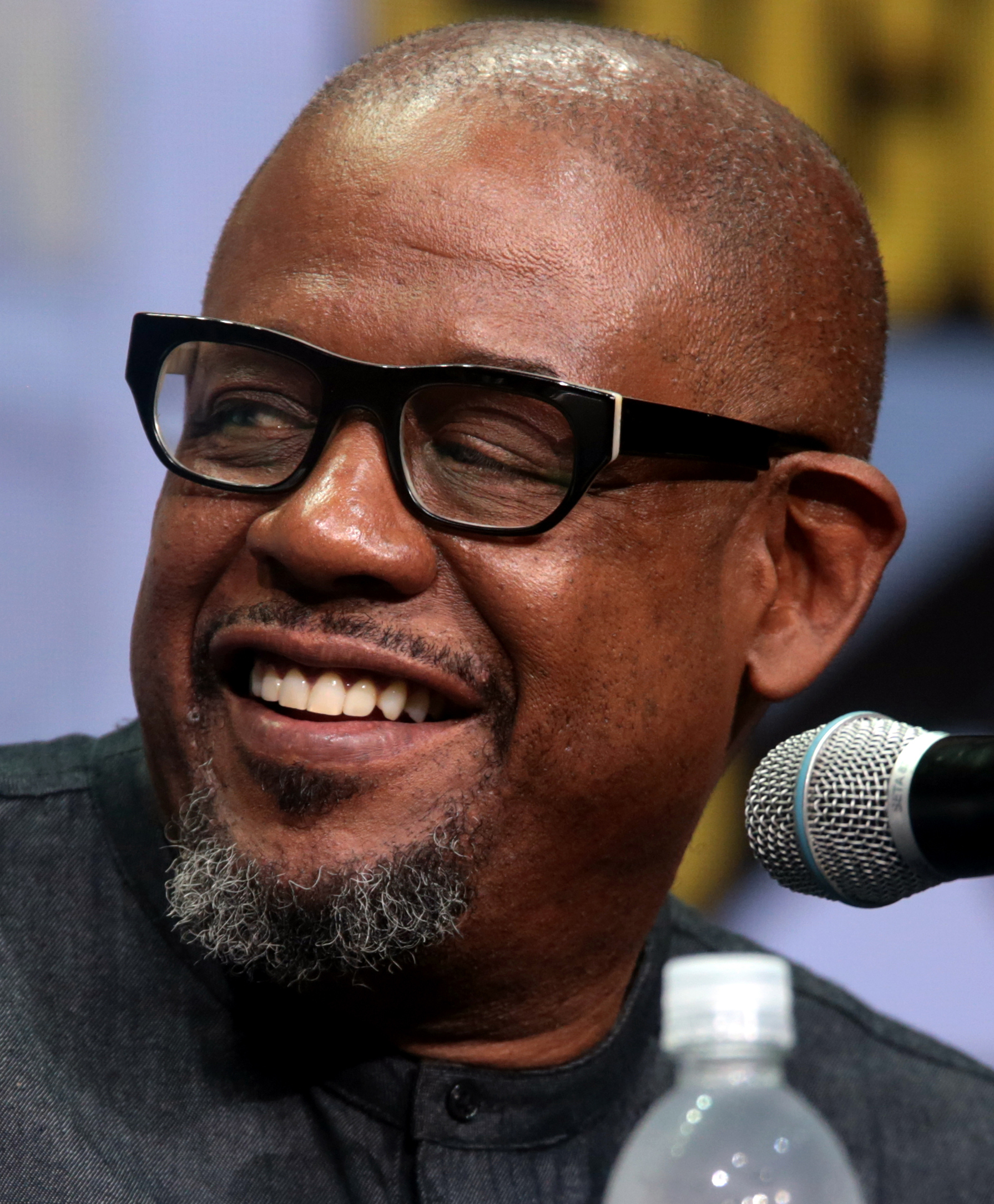
Forest Whitaker won for The Last King of Scotland (2006).

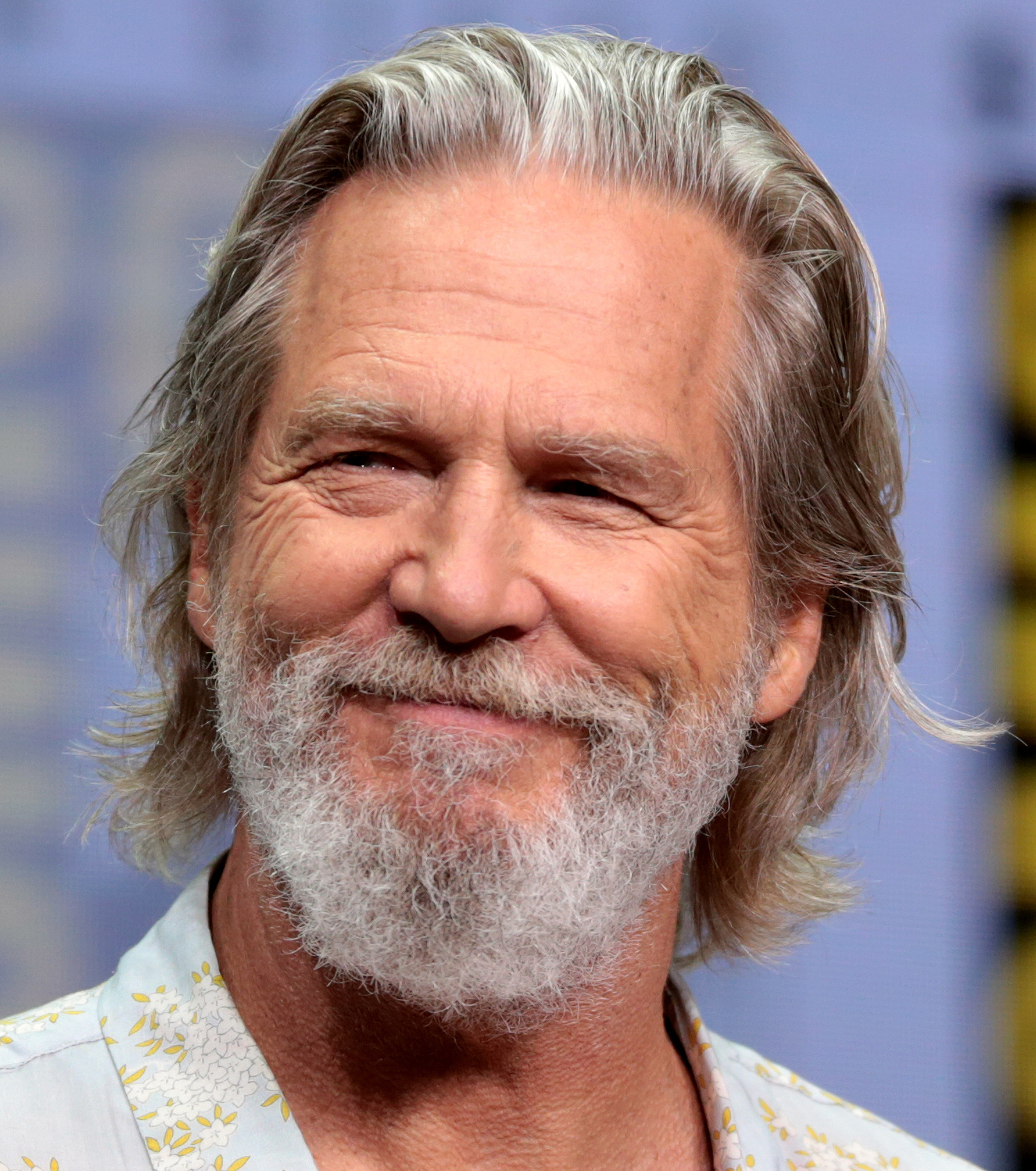
Jeff Bridges won for Crazy Heart (2009).

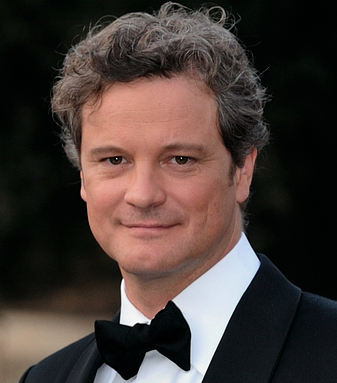
Colin Firth won for The King's Speech (2010).

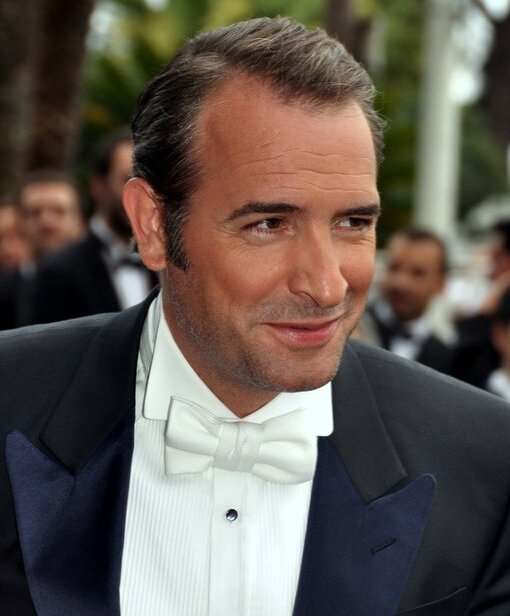
Jean Dujardin won for The Artist (2011).

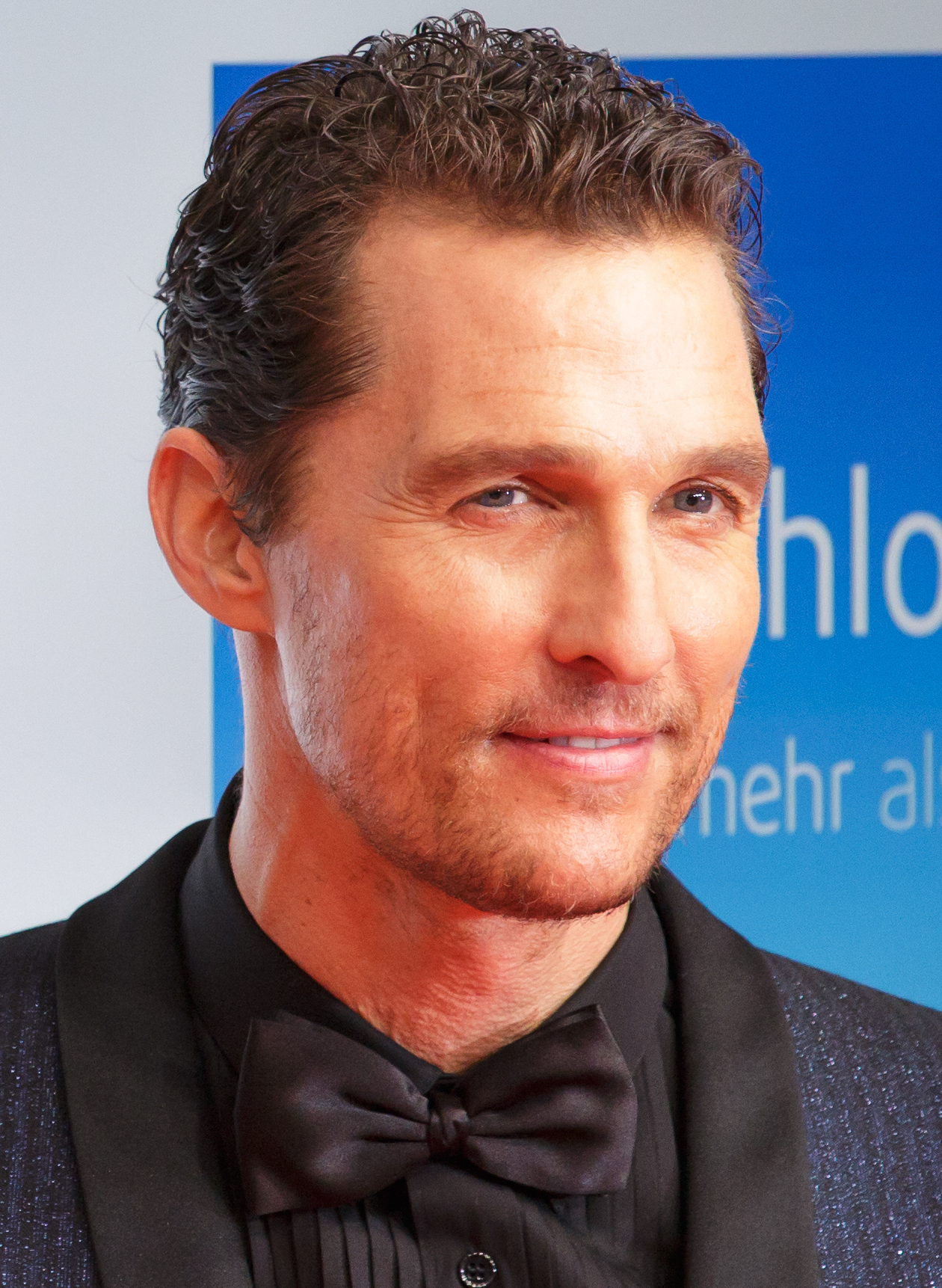
Matthew McConaughey won for Dallas Buyers Club (2013).

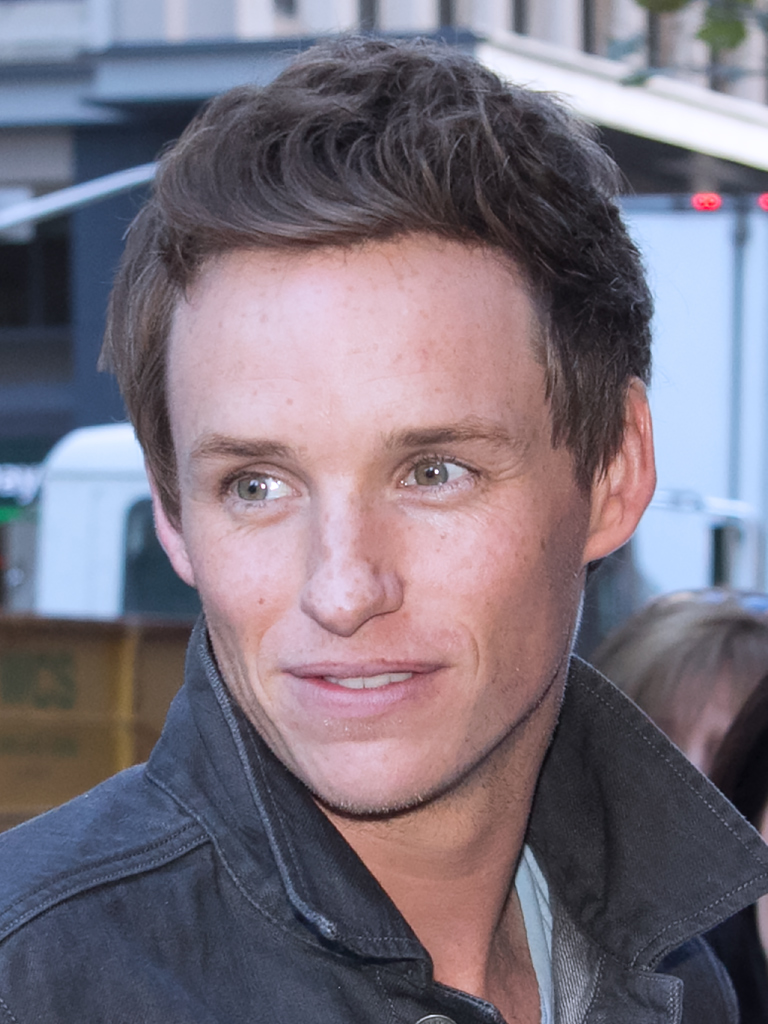
Eddie Redmayne won for The Theory of Everything (2014).

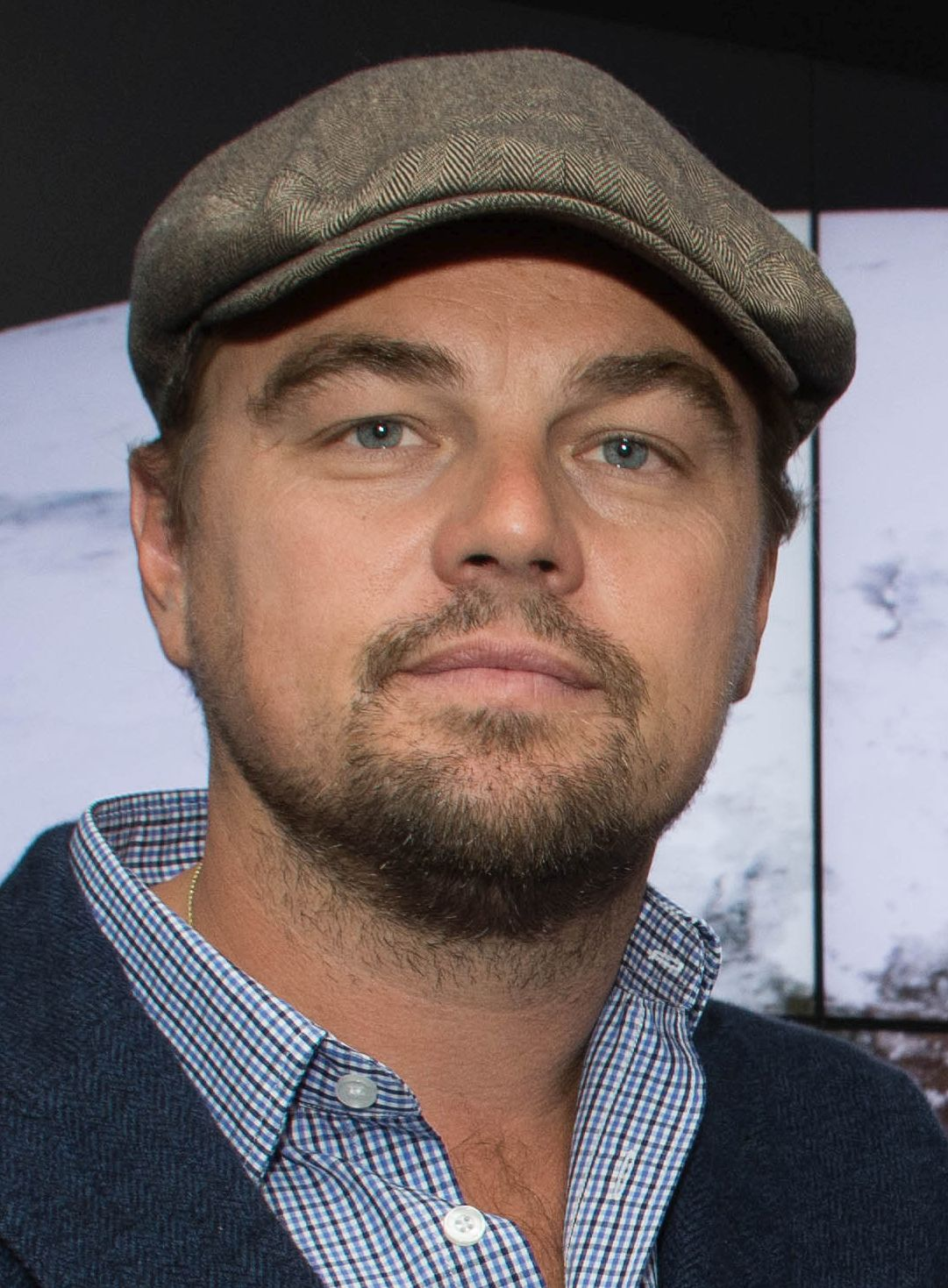
Leonardo DiCaprio won for The Revenant (2015).

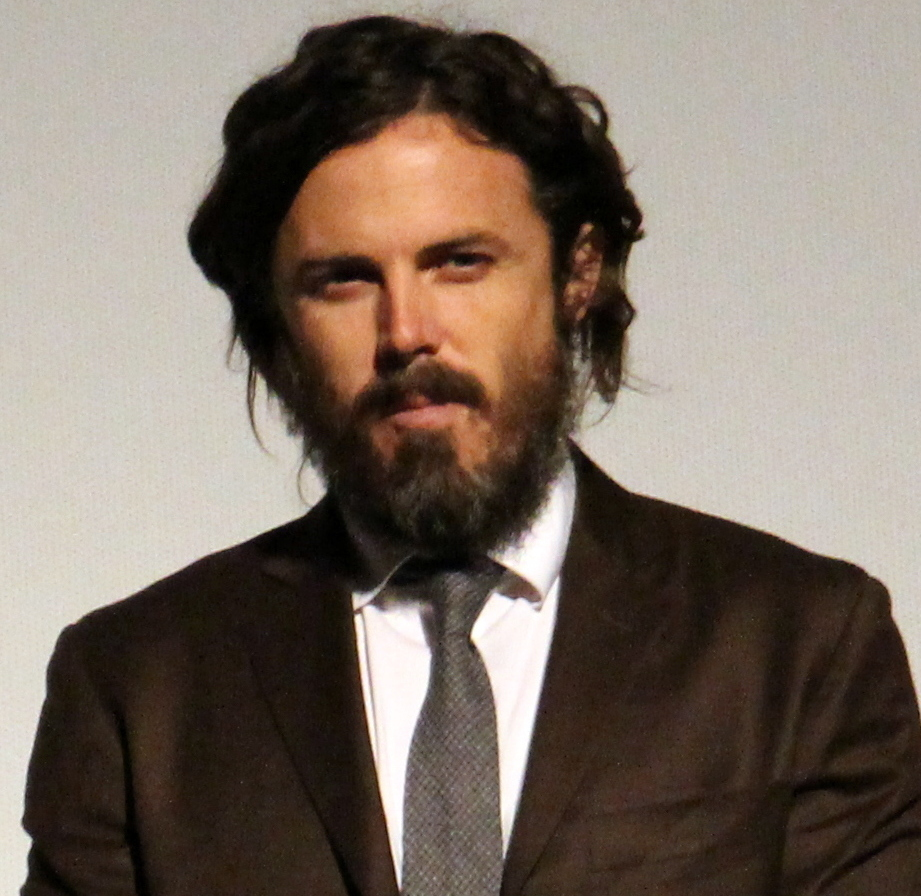
Casey Affleck won for Manchester by the Sea (2016).

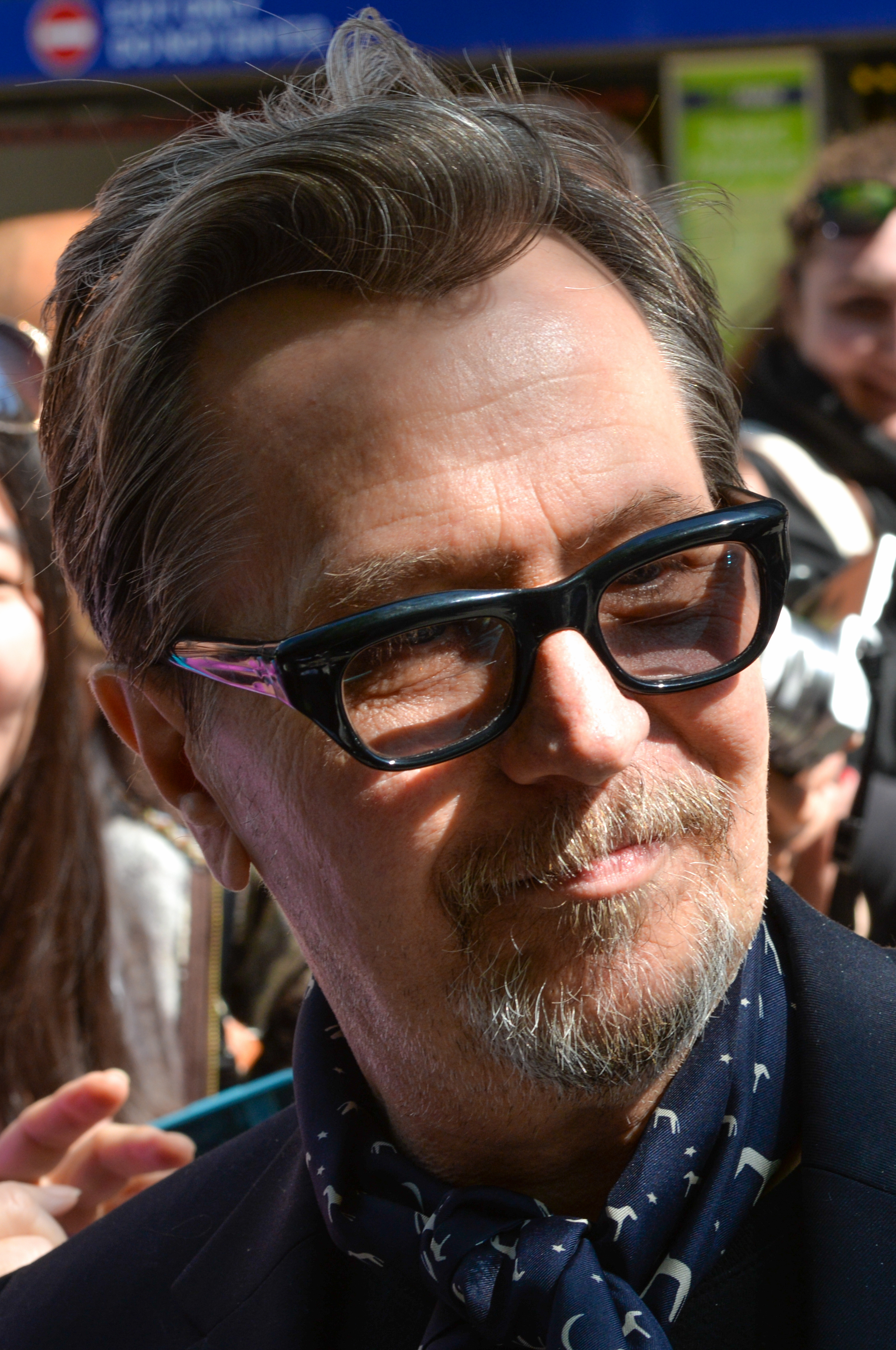
Gary Oldman won for Darkest Hour (2017).

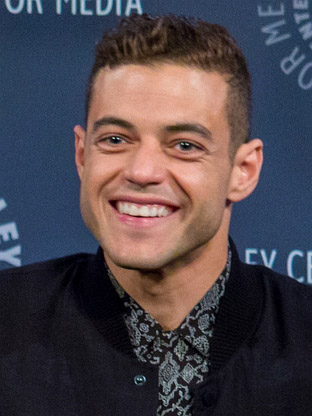
Rami Malek won for Bohemian Rhapsody (2018).

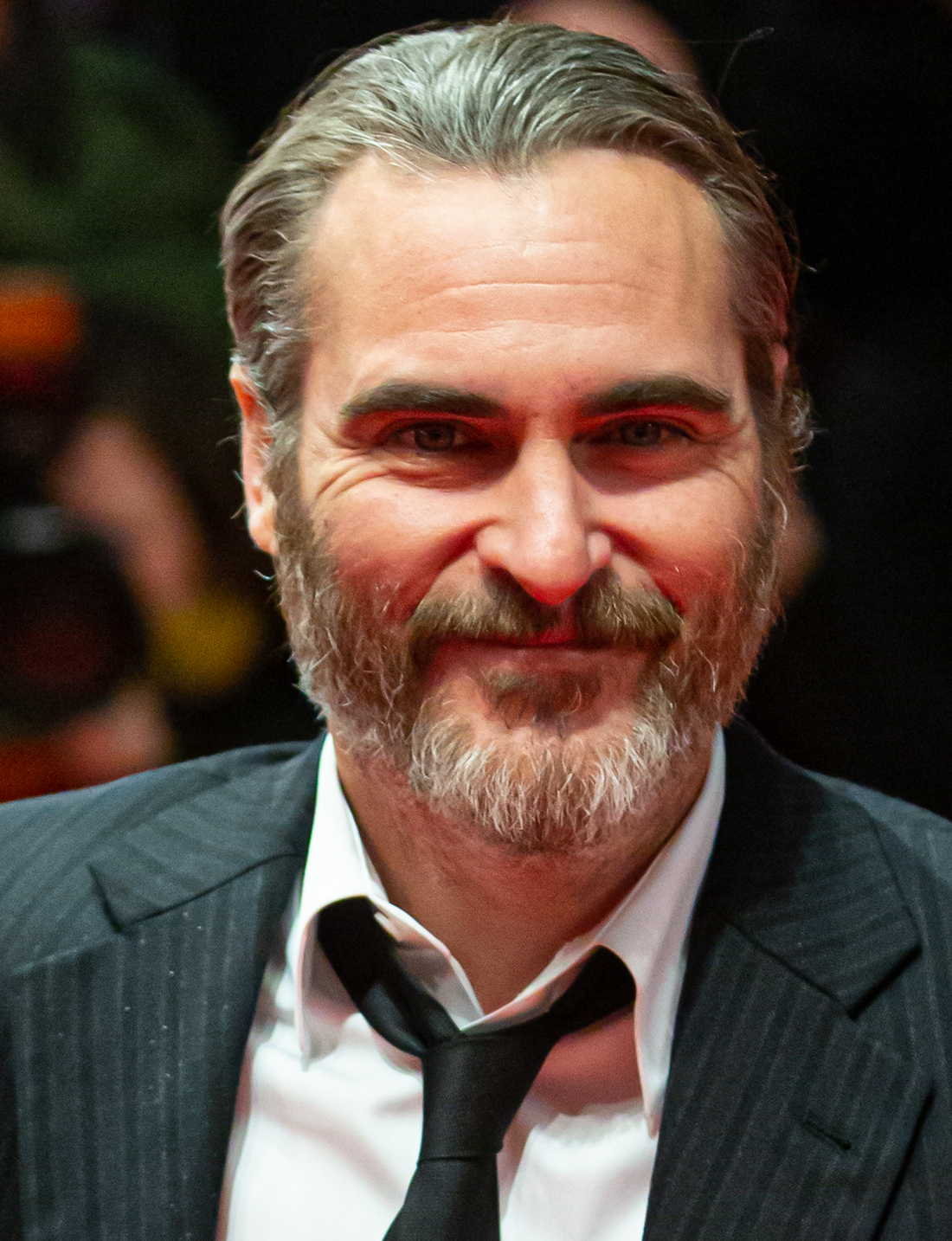
Joaquin Phoenix won for Joker (2019).

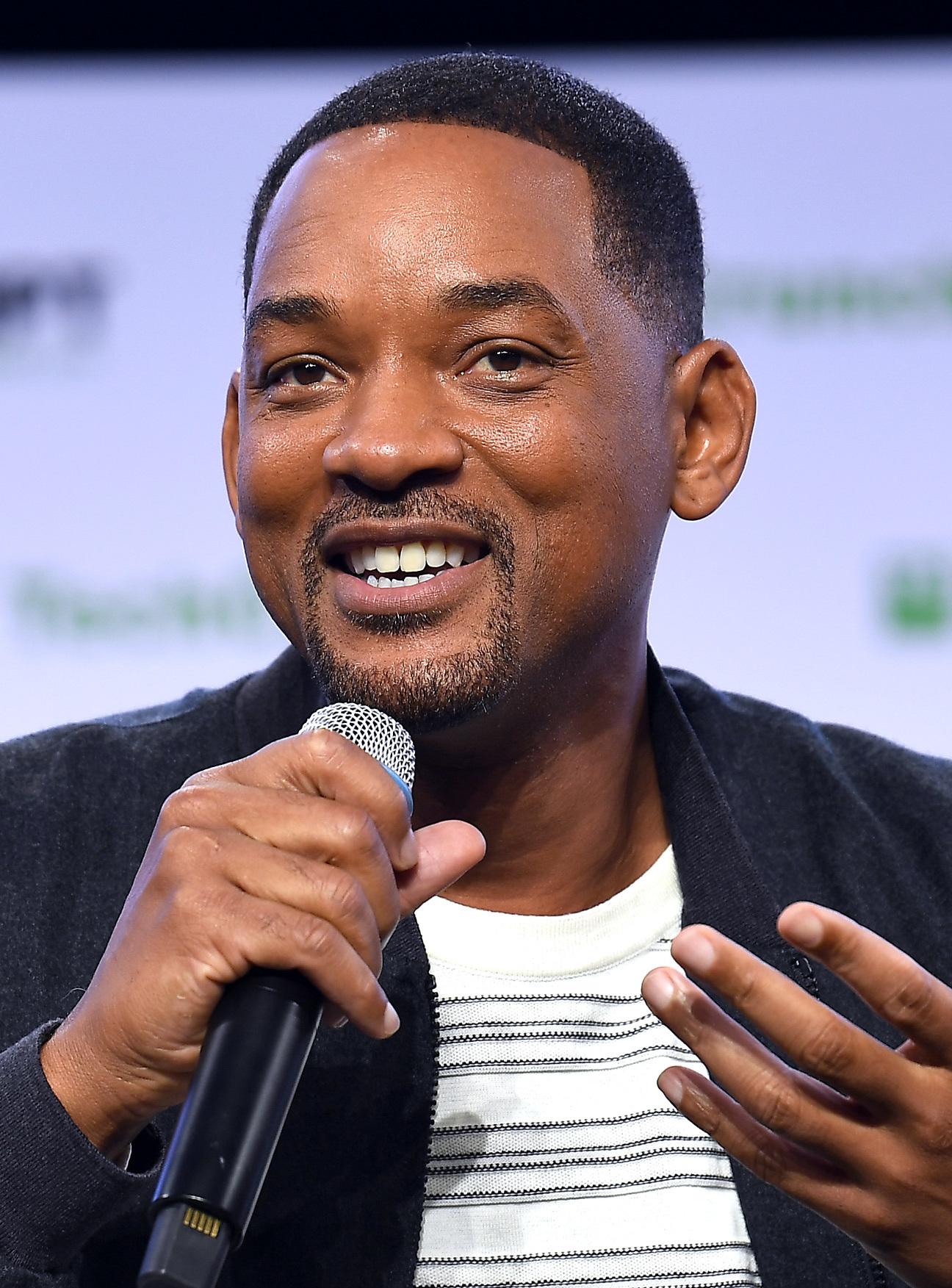
Will Smith won for King Richard (2021).

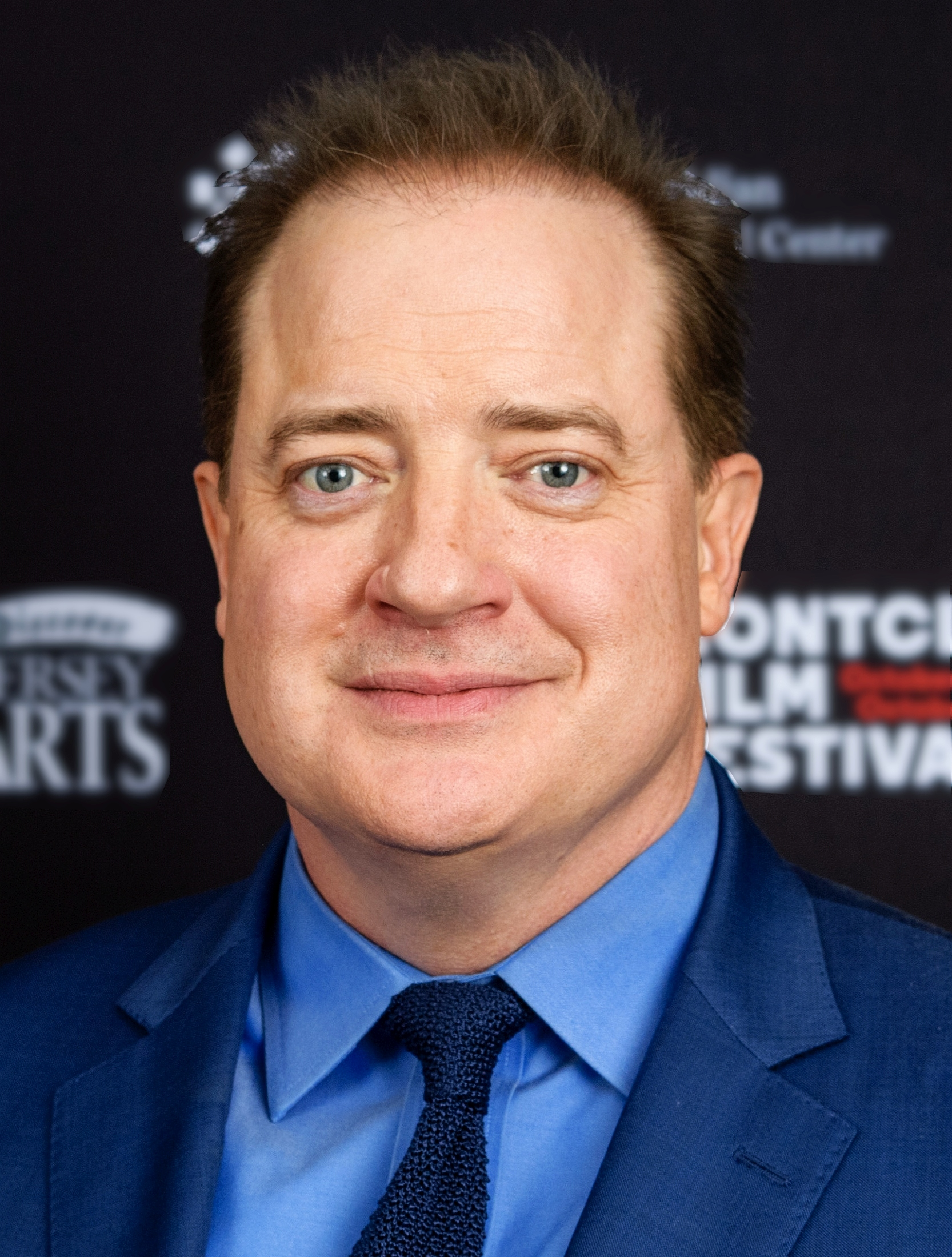
Brendan Fraser won for The Whale (2022); first Canadian winner in category.

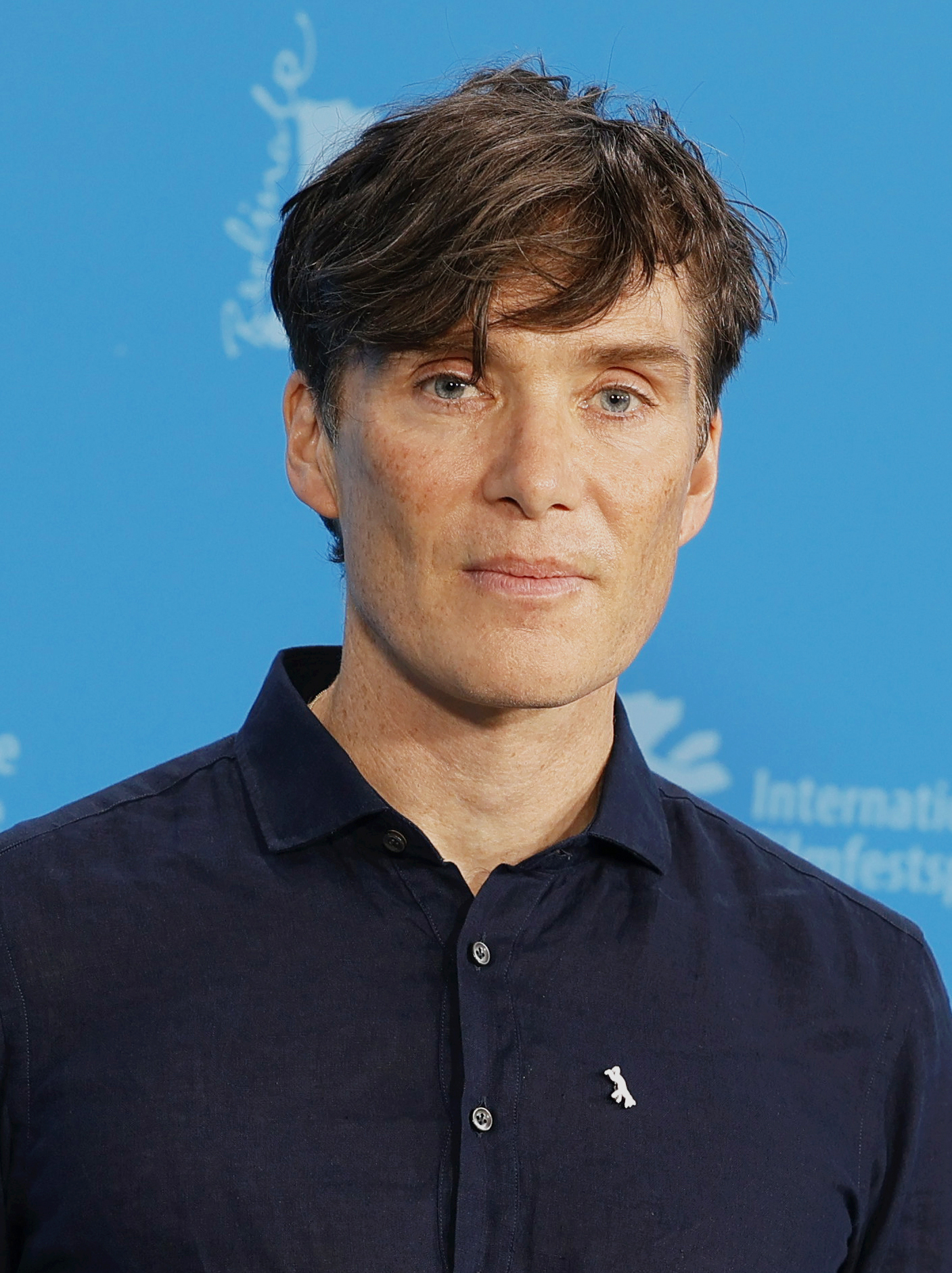
Cillian Murphy won for Oppenheimer (2023).

== Winners and nominees ==
In the following table, the years are listed as per Academy convention, and generally correspond to the year of film release in Los Angeles County; the ceremonies are always held the following year. For the first five ceremonies, the eligibility period spanned twelve months, from August 1 to July 31. For the 6th ceremony held in 1934, the eligibility period lasted from August 1, 1932, to December 31, 1933. Since the 7th ceremony held in 1935, the period of eligibility became the full previous calendar year from January 1 to December 31.

Table key
‡	Indicates the winner
§	Indicates winner who refused the award
†	Indicates a posthumous winner
†	Indicates a posthumous nominee

=== 1920s ===
Year	Actor	Role(s)	Film	Ref.
1927/28 (1st)	Emil Jannings ‡^{[A]}	Grand Duke Sergius Alexander	The Last Command	
1927/28 (1st)	Emil Jannings ‡^{[A]}	August Schilling	The Way of All Flesh	
1927/28 (1st)	Richard Barthelmess	Nickie Elkins	The Noose	
1927/28 (1st)	Richard Barthelmess	Patent Leather Kid	The Patent Leather Kid	
1927/28 (1st)	Charlie Chaplin^{[B]}	The Tramp	The Circus	
1928/29 (2nd) (Note: The 2nd Academy Awards is unique in being the only occasion where there were no official nominees. Subsequent research by AMPAS has resulted in a list of unofficial or de facto nominees, based on records of which films were evaluated by the judges.)	Warner Baxter ‡	The Cisco Kid	In Old Arizona	
1928/29 (2nd)	George Bancroft	Thunderbolt Jim Lang	Thunderbolt	
1928/29 (2nd)	Chester Morris	Chick Williams	Alibi	
1928/29 (2nd)	Paul Muni	James Dyke	The Valiant	
1928/29 (2nd)	Lewis Stone	Count Pahlen	The Patriot	

=== 1930s ===
Year	Actor	Role(s)	Film	Ref.
1929/30 (3rd)	George Arliss ‡^{[C]}	Benjamin Disraeli	Disraeli	
1929/30 (3rd)	George Arliss	The Raja	The Green Goddess	
1929/30 (3rd)	Wallace Beery	Butch "Machine Gun" Schmidt	The Big House	
1929/30 (3rd)	Maurice Chevalier ^{[C]}	Pierre Mirande	The Big Pond	
1929/30 (3rd)	Maurice Chevalier ^{[C]}	Count Alfred Renard	The Love Parade	
1929/30 (3rd)	Ronald Colman ^{[C]}	Capt. Hugh "Bulldog" Drummond	Bulldog Drummond	
1929/30 (3rd)	Ronald Colman ^{[C]}	Michel	Condemned	
1929/30 (3rd)	Lawrence Tibbett	Yegor	The Rogue Song	
1930/31 (4th)	Lionel Barrymore ‡	Stephen Ashe	A Free Soul	
1930/31 (4th)	Jackie Cooper	Skippy Skinner	Skippy	
1930/31 (4th)	Richard Dix	Yancey Cravat	Cimarron	
1930/31 (4th)	Fredric March	Tony Cavendish	The Royal Family of Broadway	
1930/31 (4th)	Adolphe Menjou	Walter Burns	The Front Page	
1931/32 (5th)	Wallace Beery ‡ (Tie)^{[D]}	Andy "Champ" Purcell	The Champ	
1931/32 (5th)	Fredric March ‡ (Tie)^{[D]}	Dr. Henry Jekyll / Mr. Edward Hyde	Dr. Jekyll and Mr. Hyde	
1931/32 (5th)	Alfred Lunt	The Actor	The Guardsman	
1932/33 (6th)	Charles Laughton ‡	King Henry VIII	The Private Life of Henry VIII	
1932/33 (6th)	Leslie Howard	Peter Standish	Berkeley Square	
1932/33 (6th)	Paul Muni	James Allen	I Am a Fugitive from a Chain Gang	
1934 (7th)	Clark Gable ‡	Peter Warne	It Happened One Night	
1934 (7th)	Frank Morgan	Alessandro, Duke of Florence	The Affairs of Cellini	
1934 (7th)	William Powell	Nick Charles	The Thin Man	
1935 (8th)	Victor McLaglen ‡	Gypo Nolan	The Informer	
1935 (8th)	Clark Gable	Lt. Fletcher Christian	Mutiny on the Bounty	
1935 (8th)	Charles Laughton	Captain William Bligh	Mutiny on the Bounty	
1935 (8th)	Paul Muni (Write-in)^{[E]}	Joe Radek	Black Fury	
1935 (8th)	Franchot Tone	Midshipman Roger Byam	Mutiny on the Bounty	
1936 (9th)	Paul Muni ‡	Louis Pasteur	The Story of Louis Pasteur	
1936 (9th)	Gary Cooper	Longfellow Deeds	Mr. Deeds Goes to Town	
1936 (9th)	Walter Huston	Sam Dodsworth	Dodsworth	
1936 (9th)	William Powell	Godfrey Park	My Man Godfrey	
1936 (9th)	Spencer Tracy	Father Tim Mullin	San Francisco	
1937 (10th)	Spencer Tracy ‡	Manuel Fidello	Captains Courageous	
1937 (10th)	Charles Boyer	Emperor Napoleon Bonaparte	Conquest	
1937 (10th)	Fredric March	Norman Maine	A Star Is Born	
1937 (10th)	Robert Montgomery	Danny	Night Must Fall	
1937 (10th)	Paul Muni	Émile Zola	The Life of Emile Zola	
1938 (11th)	Spencer Tracy ‡	Father Edward Flanagan	Boys Town	
1938 (11th)	Charles Boyer	Pepe le Moko	Algiers	
1938 (11th)	James Cagney	Rocky Sullivan	Angels with Dirty Faces	
1938 (11th)	Robert Donat	Dr. Andrew Manson	The Citadel	
1938 (11th)	Leslie Howard	Professor Henry Higgins	Pygmalion	
1939 (12th)	Robert Donat ‡	Charles Edward Chipping	Goodbye, Mr. Chips	
1939 (12th)	Clark Gable	Rhett Butler	Gone with the Wind	
1939 (12th)	Laurence Olivier	Heathcliff	Wuthering Heights	
1939 (12th)	Mickey Rooney	Mickey Moran	Babes in Arms	
1939 (12th)	James Stewart	Jefferson Smith	Mr. Smith Goes to Washington	

=== 1940s ===
Year	Actor	Role(s)	Film	Ref.
1940 (13th)	James Stewart ‡	Macaulay "Mike" Connor	The Philadelphia Story	
1940 (13th)	Charlie Chaplin	Adenoid Hynkel & The Barber	The Great Dictator	
1940 (13th)	Henry Fonda	Tom Joad	The Grapes of Wrath	
1940 (13th)	Raymond Massey	Abraham Lincoln	Abe Lincoln in Illinois	
1940 (13th)	Laurence Olivier	Maximilian "Maxim" de Winter	Rebecca	
1941 (14th)	Gary Cooper ‡	Sgt. Alvin York	Sergeant York	
1941 (14th)	Cary Grant	Roger Adams	Penny Serenade	
1941 (14th)	Walter Huston	Mr. Scratch	The Devil and Daniel Webster	
1941 (14th)	Robert Montgomery	Joe Pendleton	Here Comes Mr. Jordan	
1941 (14th)	Orson Welles	Charles Foster Kane	Citizen Kane	
1942 (15th)	James Cagney ‡	George M. Cohan	Yankee Doodle Dandy	
1942 (15th)	Ronald Colman	Charles Rainier	Random Harvest	
1942 (15th)	Gary Cooper	Lou Gehrig	The Pride of the Yankees	
1942 (15th)	Walter Pidgeon	Clem Miniver	Mrs. Miniver	
1942 (15th)	Monty Woolley	Howard	The Pied Piper	
1943 (16th)	Paul Lukas ‡	Kurt Muller	Watch on the Rhine	
1943 (16th)	Humphrey Bogart	Rick Blaine	Casablanca	
1943 (16th)	Gary Cooper	Robert Jordan	For Whom the Bell Tolls	
1943 (16th)	Walter Pidgeon	Pierre Curie	Madame Curie	
1943 (16th)	Mickey Rooney	Homer Macauley	The Human Comedy	
1944 (17th)	Bing Crosby ‡	Father Chuck O'Malley	Going My Way	
1944 (17th)	Charles Boyer	Gregory Anton	Gaslight	
1944 (17th)	Barry Fitzgerald ^{[F]}	Father Fitzgibbon	Going My Way	
1944 (17th)	Cary Grant	Ernie Mott	None but the Lonely Heart	
1944 (17th)	Alexander Knox	Woodrow Wilson	Wilson	
1945 (18th)	Ray Milland ‡	Don Birnam	The Lost Weekend	
1945 (18th)	Bing Crosby	Father Chuck O'Malley	The Bells of St. Mary's	
1945 (18th)	Gene Kelly	Joseph Brady	Anchors Aweigh	
1945 (18th)	Gregory Peck	Father Francis	The Keys of the Kingdom	
1945 (18th)	Cornel Wilde	Frédéric Chopin	A Song to Remember	
1946 (19th)	Fredric March ‡	Platoon Sergeant Al Stephenson	The Best Years of Our Lives	
1946 (19th)	Laurence Olivier	King Henry V of England	Henry V	
1946 (19th)	Larry Parks	Al Jolson	The Jolson Story	
1946 (19th)	Gregory Peck	Ezra "Penny" Baxter	The Yearling	
1946 (19th)	James Stewart	George Bailey	It's a Wonderful Life	
1947 (20th)	Ronald Colman ‡	Anthony John	A Double Life	
1947 (20th)	John Garfield	Charley Davis	Body and Soul	
1947 (20th)	Gregory Peck	Philip Schuyler Green	Gentleman's Agreement	
1947 (20th)	William Powell	Clarence Day Sr.	Life with Father	
1947 (20th)	Michael Redgrave	Orin Mannon	Mourning Becomes Electra	
1948 (21st)	Laurence Olivier ‡	Hamlet, Prince of Denmark	Hamlet	
1948 (21st)	Lew Ayres	Dr. Robert Richardson	Johnny Belinda	
1948 (21st)	Montgomery Clift	Ralph "Steve" Stevenson	The Search	
1948 (21st)	Dan Dailey	"Skid" Johnson	When My Baby Smiles at Me	
1948 (21st)	Clifton Webb	Lynn Aloysius Belvedere	Sitting Pretty	
1949 (22nd)	Broderick Crawford ‡	Willie Stark	All the King's Men	
1949 (22nd)	Kirk Douglas	Michael "Midge" Kelly	Champion	
1949 (22nd)	Gregory Peck	Brig. General Frank Savage	Twelve O'Clock High	
1949 (22nd)	Richard Todd	Cpl. Lachlan "Lachie" MacLachlan	The Hasty Heart	
1949 (22nd)	John Wayne	Sergeant John M. Stryker	Sands of Iwo Jima	

=== 1950s ===
Year	Actor	Role(s)	Film	Ref.
1950 (23rd)	José Ferrer ‡	Cyrano de Bergerac	Cyrano de Bergerac	
1950 (23rd)	Louis Calhern	Oliver Wendell Holmes Jr.	The Magnificent Yankee	
1950 (23rd)	William Holden	Joe Gillis	Sunset Boulevard	
1950 (23rd)	James Stewart	Elwood P. Dowd	Harvey	
1950 (23rd)	Spencer Tracy	Stanley T. Banks	Father of the Bride	
1951 (24th)	Humphrey Bogart ‡	Charlie Allnut	The African Queen	
1951 (24th)	Marlon Brando	Stanley Kowalski	A Streetcar Named Desire	
1951 (24th)	Montgomery Clift	George Eastman	A Place in the Sun	
1951 (24th)	Arthur Kennedy	Larry Nevins	Bright Victory	
1951 (24th)	Fredric March	Willy Loman	Death of a Salesman	
1952 (25th)	Gary Cooper ‡	Marshal Will Kane	High Noon	
1952 (25th)	Marlon Brando	Emiliano Zapata	Viva Zapata!	
1952 (25th)	Kirk Douglas	Jonathan Shields	The Bad and the Beautiful	
1952 (25th)	José Ferrer	Henri de Toulouse-Lautrec & Comte Alphonse de Toulouse-Lautrec	Moulin Rouge	
1952 (25th)	Alec Guinness	Henry Holland	The Lavender Hill Mob	
1953 (26th)	William Holden ‡	Sgt. J.J. Sefton	Stalag 17	
1953 (26th)	Marlon Brando	Mark Antony	Julius Caesar	
1953 (26th)	Richard Burton	Marcellus Gallio	The Robe	
1953 (26th)	Montgomery Clift	Pvt. Robert E. Lee "Prew" Prewitt	From Here to Eternity	
1953 (26th)	Burt Lancaster	1st Sgt. Milton Warden	From Here to Eternity	
1954 (27th)	Marlon Brando ‡	Terry Malloy	On the Waterfront	
1954 (27th)	Humphrey Bogart	Lt. Cmdr. Philip Francis Queeg	The Caine Mutiny	
1954 (27th)	Bing Crosby	Frank Elgin	The Country Girl	
1954 (27th)	James Mason	Norman Maine	A Star Is Born	
1954 (27th)	Dan O'Herlihy	Robinson Crusoe	Robinson Crusoe	
1955 (28th)	Ernest Borgnine ‡	Marty Piletti	Marty	
1955 (28th)	James Cagney	Martin Snyder	Love Me or Leave Me	
1955 (28th)	James Dean †	Cal Trask	East of Eden	
1955 (28th)	Frank Sinatra	Frankie Machine	The Man with the Golden Arm	
1955 (28th)	Spencer Tracy	John J. Macreedy	Bad Day at Black Rock	
1956 (29th)	Yul Brynner ‡	King Mongkut of Siam	The King and I	
1956 (29th)	James Dean †	Jett Rink	Giant	
1956 (29th)	Kirk Douglas	Vincent van Gogh	Lust for Life	
1956 (29th)	Rock Hudson	Jordan "Bick" Benedict Jr.	Giant	
1956 (29th)	Laurence Olivier	King Richard III	Richard III	
1957 (30th)	Alec Guinness ‡	Colonel Nicholson	The Bridge on the River Kwai	
1957 (30th)	Marlon Brando	Major Lloyd "Ace" Gruver, USAF	Sayonara	
1957 (30th)	Anthony Franciosa	Polo Pope	A Hatful of Rain	
1957 (30th)	Charles Laughton	Sir Wilfrid Robarts	Witness for the Prosecution	
1957 (30th)	Anthony Quinn	Gino	Wild Is the Wind	
1958 (31st)	David Niven ‡	Major Angus Pollock	Separate Tables	
1958 (31st)	Tony Curtis	John "Joker" Jackson	The Defiant Ones	
1958 (31st)	Paul Newman	Brick Pollitt	Cat on a Hot Tin Roof	
1958 (31st)	Sidney Poitier	Noah Cullen	The Defiant Ones	
1958 (31st)	Spencer Tracy	The Old Man	The Old Man and the Sea	
1959 (32nd)	Charlton Heston ‡	Judah Ben-Hur	Ben-Hur	
1959 (32nd)	Laurence Harvey	Joe Lampton	Room at the Top	
1959 (32nd)	Jack Lemmon	Jerry / Daphne	Some Like It Hot	
1959 (32nd)	Paul Muni	Dr. Sam Abelman	The Last Angry Man	
1959 (32nd)	James Stewart	Paul Biegler	Anatomy of a Murder	

=== 1960s ===
Year	Actor	Role(s)	Film	Ref.
1960 (33rd)	Burt Lancaster ‡	Elmer Gantry	Elmer Gantry	
1960 (33rd)	Trevor Howard	Walter Morel	Sons and Lovers	
1960 (33rd)	Jack Lemmon	C. C. "Bud" Baxter	The Apartment	
1960 (33rd)	Laurence Olivier	Archie Rice	The Entertainer	
1960 (33rd)	Spencer Tracy	Henry Drummond	Inherit the Wind	
1961 (34th)	Maximilian Schell ‡	Hans Rolfe	Judgment at Nuremberg	
1961 (34th)	Charles Boyer	Cesar	Fanny	
1961 (34th)	Paul Newman	"Fast" Eddie Felson	The Hustler	
1961 (34th)	Spencer Tracy	Chief Judge Dan Haywood	Judgment at Nuremberg	
1961 (34th)	Stuart Whitman	Jim Fuller	The Mark	
1962 (35th)	Gregory Peck ‡	Atticus Finch	To Kill a Mockingbird	
1962 (35th)	Burt Lancaster	Robert Stroud	Birdman of Alcatraz	
1962 (35th)	Jack Lemmon	Joe Clay	Days of Wine and Roses	
1962 (35th)	Marcello Mastroianni	Ferdinando Cefalù	Divorce Italian Style	
1962 (35th)	Peter O'Toole	Thomas Edward Lawrence	Lawrence of Arabia	
1963 (36th)	Sidney Poitier ‡	Homer Smith	Lilies of the Field	
1963 (36th)	Albert Finney	Tom Jones	Tom Jones	
1963 (36th)	Richard Harris	Frank Machin	This Sporting Life	
1963 (36th)	Rex Harrison	Julius Caesar	Cleopatra	
1963 (36th)	Paul Newman	Hud Bannon	Hud	
1964 (37th)	Rex Harrison ‡	Professor Henry Higgins	My Fair Lady	
1964 (37th)	Richard Burton	Thomas Becket	Becket	
1964 (37th)	Peter O'Toole	King Henry II	Becket	
1964 (37th)	Anthony Quinn	Alexis Zorba	Zorba the Greek	
1964 (37th)	Peter Sellers	Group Captain Lionel Mandrake, President Merkin Muffley, and Dr. Strangelove	Dr. Strangelove or: How I Learned to Stop Worrying and Love the Bomb	
1965 (38th)	Lee Marvin ‡	Kid Shelleen & Tim Strawn	Cat Ballou	
1965 (38th)	Richard Burton	Alec Leamas	The Spy Who Came in from the Cold	
1965 (38th)	Laurence Olivier	Othello	Othello	
1965 (38th)	Rod Steiger	Sol Nazerman	The Pawnbroker	
1965 (38th)	Oskar Werner	Willie Schumann	Ship of Fools	
1966 (39th)	Paul Scofield ‡	Sir Thomas More	A Man for All Seasons	
1966 (39th)	Alan Arkin	Lt. Yuri Rozanov	The Russians Are Coming the Russians Are Coming	
1966 (39th)	Richard Burton	George	Who's Afraid of Virginia Woolf?	
1966 (39th)	Michael Caine	Alfie Elkins	Alfie	
1966 (39th)	Steve McQueen	Jake Holman	The Sand Pebbles	
1967 (40th)	Rod Steiger ‡	Bill Gillespie	In the Heat of the Night	
1967 (40th)	Warren Beatty	Clyde Barrow	Bonnie and Clyde	
1967 (40th)	Dustin Hoffman	Benjamin Braddock	The Graduate	
1967 (40th)	Paul Newman	Lucas "Luke" Jackson	Cool Hand Luke	
1967 (40th)	Spencer Tracy †	Matt Drayton	Guess Who's Coming to Dinner	
1968 (41st)	Cliff Robertson ‡	Charly Gordon	Charly	
1968 (41st)	Alan Arkin	John Singer	The Heart Is a Lonely Hunter	
1968 (41st)	Alan Bates	Yakov Bok	The Fixer	
1968 (41st)	Ron Moody	Fagin	Oliver!	
1968 (41st)	Peter O'Toole	King Henry II	The Lion in Winter	
1969 (42nd)	John Wayne ‡	Reuben "Rooster" Cogburn	True Grit	
1969 (42nd)	Richard Burton	King Henry VIII	Anne of the Thousand Days	
1969 (42nd)	Dustin Hoffman	Enrico Salvatore "Ratso" Rizzo	Midnight Cowboy	
1969 (42nd)	Peter O'Toole	Arthur Chipping	Goodbye, Mr. Chips	
1969 (42nd)	Jon Voight	Joe Buck	Midnight Cowboy	

=== 1970s ===
Year	Actor	Role(s)	Film	Ref.
1970 (43rd)	George C. Scott §	General George S. Patton Jr.	Patton	
1970 (43rd)	Melvyn Douglas	Tom Garrison	I Never Sang for My Father	
1970 (43rd)	James Earl Jones	Jack Jefferson	The Great White Hope	
1970 (43rd)	Jack Nicholson	Robert Eroica Dupea	Five Easy Pieces	
1970 (43rd)	Ryan O'Neal	Oliver Barrett IV	Love Story	
1971 (44th)	Gene Hackman ‡	Jimmy "Popeye" Doyle	The French Connection	
1971 (44th)	Peter Finch	Dr. Daniel Hirsh	Sunday Bloody Sunday	
1971 (44th)	Walter Matthau	Joseph P. Kotcher	Kotch	
1971 (44th)	George C. Scott	Dr. Herbert Bock	The Hospital	
1971 (44th)	Topol	Tevye	Fiddler on the Roof	
1972 (45th)	Marlon Brando §	Vito Corleone	The Godfather	
1972 (45th)	Michael Caine	Milo Tindle	Sleuth	
1972 (45th)	Laurence Olivier	Andrew Wyke	Sleuth	
1972 (45th)	Peter O'Toole	Jack Gurney, 14th Earl of Gurney	The Ruling Class	
1972 (45th)	Paul Winfield	Nathan Lee Morgan	Sounder	
1973 (46th)	Jack Lemmon ‡	Harry Stoner	Save the Tiger	
1973 (46th)	Marlon Brando	Paul	Last Tango in Paris	
1973 (46th)	Jack Nicholson	Signalman 1st Class Billy L. "Badass" Buddusky	The Last Detail	
1973 (46th)	Al Pacino	Frank Serpico	Serpico	
1973 (46th)	Robert Redford	Johnny "Kelly" Hooker	The Sting	
1974 (47th)	Art Carney ‡	Harry Coombes	Harry and Tonto	
1974 (47th)	Albert Finney	Hercule Poirot	Murder on the Orient Express	
1974 (47th)	Dustin Hoffman	Lenny Bruce	Lenny	
1974 (47th)	Jack Nicholson	J. J. "Jake" Gittes	Chinatown	
1974 (47th)	Al Pacino	Michael Corleone	The Godfather Part II	
1975 (48th)	Jack Nicholson ‡	Randle McMurphy	One Flew Over the Cuckoo's Nest	
1975 (48th)	Walter Matthau	Willy Clark	The Sunshine Boys	
1975 (48th)	Al Pacino	Sonny Wortzik	Dog Day Afternoon	
1975 (48th)	Maximilian Schell	Arthur Goldman	The Man in the Glass Booth	
1975 (48th)	James Whitmore	Harry S. Truman	Give 'em Hell, Harry!	
1976 (49th)	Peter Finch †	Howard Beale	Network	
1976 (49th)	Robert De Niro	Travis Bickle	Taxi Driver	
1976 (49th)	Giancarlo Giannini	Pasqualino Frafuso	Seven Beauties	
1976 (49th)	William Holden	Max Schumacher	Network	
1976 (49th)	Sylvester Stallone	Rocky Balboa	Rocky	
1977 (50th)	Richard Dreyfuss ‡	Elliot Garfield	The Goodbye Girl	
1977 (50th)	Woody Allen	Alvy Singer	Annie Hall	
1977 (50th)	Richard Burton	Martin Dysart	Equus	
1977 (50th)	Marcello Mastroianni	Gabriele	A Special Day	
1977 (50th)	John Travolta	Tony Manero	Saturday Night Fever	
1978 (51st)	Jon Voight ‡	Luke Martin	Coming Home	
1978 (51st)	Warren Beatty	Joe Pendleton / Leo Farnsworth / Tom Jarrett	Heaven Can Wait	
1978 (51st)	Gary Busey	Buddy Holly	The Buddy Holly Story	
1978 (51st)	Robert De Niro	Michael Vronsky	The Deer Hunter	
1978 (51st)	Laurence Olivier	Ezra Lieberman	The Boys from Brazil	
1979 (52nd)	Dustin Hoffman ‡	Ted Kramer	Kramer vs. Kramer	
1979 (52nd)	Jack Lemmon	Jack Godell	The China Syndrome	
1979 (52nd)	Al Pacino	Arthur Kirkland	...And Justice for All	
1979 (52nd)	Roy Scheider	Joe Gideon	All That Jazz	
1979 (52nd)	Peter Sellers	Chance The Gardener / Chauncey Gardiner	Being There	

=== 1980s ===
Year	Actor	Role(s)	Film	Ref.
1980 (53rd)	Robert De Niro ‡	Jake LaMotta	Raging Bull	
1980 (53rd)	Robert Duvall	Lt. Col. Wilbur "Bull" Meechum	The Great Santini	
1980 (53rd)	John Hurt	John Merrick	The Elephant Man	
1980 (53rd)	Jack Lemmon	Scottie Templeton	Tribute	
1980 (53rd)	Peter O'Toole	Eli Cross	The Stunt Man	
1981 (54th)	Henry Fonda ‡	Norman Thayer Jr.	On Golden Pond	
1981 (54th)	Warren Beatty	John "Jack" Reed	Reds	
1981 (54th)	Burt Lancaster	Lou Pascal	Atlantic City	
1981 (54th)	Dudley Moore	Arthur Bach	Arthur	
1981 (54th)	Paul Newman	Michael Gallagher	Absence of Malice	
1982 (55th)	Ben Kingsley ‡	Mahatma Gandhi	Gandhi	
1982 (55th)	Dustin Hoffman	Michael Dorsey / Dorothy Michaels	Tootsie	
1982 (55th)	Jack Lemmon	Edmund Horman	Missing	
1982 (55th)	Paul Newman	Frank Galvin	The Verdict	
1982 (55th)	Peter O'Toole	Alan Swann	My Favorite Year	
1983 (56th)	Robert Duvall ‡	Mac Sledge	Tender Mercies	
1983 (56th)	Michael Caine	Dr. Frank Bryant	Educating Rita	
1983 (56th)	Tom Conti	Gowan McGland	Reuben, Reuben	
1983 (56th)	Tom Courtenay	Norman	The Dresser	
1983 (56th)	Albert Finney	Sir	The Dresser	
1984 (57th)	F. Murray Abraham ‡	Antonio Salieri	Amadeus	
1984 (57th)	Jeff Bridges	Scott “Starman” Hayden	Starman	
1984 (57th)	Albert Finney	Geoffrey Firmin	Under the Volcano	
1984 (57th)	Tom Hulce	Wolfgang Amadeus Mozart	Amadeus	
1984 (57th)	Sam Waterston	Sydney Schanberg	The Killing Fields	
1985 (58th)	William Hurt ‡	Luis Molina	Kiss of the Spider Woman	
1985 (58th)	Harrison Ford	John Book	Witness	
1985 (58th)	James Garner	Murphy Jones	Murphy's Romance	
1985 (58th)	Jack Nicholson	Charley Partanna	Prizzi's Honor	
1985 (58th)	Jon Voight	Oscar "Manny" Manheim	Runaway Train	
1986 (59th)	Paul Newman ‡	"Fast" Eddie Felson	The Color of Money	
1986 (59th)	Dexter Gordon	Dale Turner	Round Midnight	
1986 (59th)	Bob Hoskins	George	Mona Lisa	
1986 (59th)	William Hurt	James Leeds	Children of a Lesser God	
1986 (59th)	James Woods	Richard Boyle	Salvador	
1987 (60th)	Michael Douglas ‡	Gordon Gekko	Wall Street	
1987 (60th)	William Hurt	Tom Grunick	Broadcast News	
1987 (60th)	Marcello Mastroianni	Romano Patroni	Dark Eyes	
1987 (60th)	Jack Nicholson	Francis Phelan	Ironweed	
1987 (60th)	Robin Williams	Adrian Cronauer	Good Morning, Vietnam	
1988 (61st)	Dustin Hoffman ‡	Raymond Babbitt	Rain Man	
1988 (61st)	Gene Hackman	Rupert Anderson	Mississippi Burning	
1988 (61st)	Tom Hanks	Josh Baskin	Big	
1988 (61st)	Edward James Olmos	Jaime Escalante	Stand and Deliver	
1988 (61st)	Max von Sydow	Lassefar "Lasse" Karlsson	Pelle the Conqueror	
1989 (62nd)	Daniel Day-Lewis ‡	Christy Brown	My Left Foot	
1989 (62nd)	Kenneth Branagh	King Henry V	Henry V	
1989 (62nd)	Tom Cruise	Ron Kovic	Born on the Fourth of July	
1989 (62nd)	Morgan Freeman	Hoke Colburn	Driving Miss Daisy	
1989 (62nd)	Robin Williams	John Keating	Dead Poets Society	

=== 1990s ===
Year	Actor	Role(s)	Film	Ref.
1990 (63rd)	Jeremy Irons ‡	Claus von Bülow	Reversal of Fortune	
1990 (63rd)	Kevin Costner	Lt. John J. Dunbar	Dances With Wolves	
1990 (63rd)	Robert De Niro	Leonard Lowe	Awakenings	
1990 (63rd)	Gérard Depardieu	Cyrano de Bergerac	Cyrano de Bergerac	
1990 (63rd)	Richard Harris	"Bull" McCabe	The Field	
1991 (64th)	Anthony Hopkins ‡	Dr. Hannibal Lecter	The Silence of the Lambs	
1991 (64th)	Warren Beatty	Benjamin "Bugsy" Siegel	Bugsy	
1991 (64th)	Robert De Niro	Max Cady	Cape Fear	
1991 (64th)	Nick Nolte	Tom Wingo	The Prince of Tides	
1991 (64th)	Robin Williams	Henry "Parry" Sagan	The Fisher King	
1992 (65th)	Al Pacino ‡	Lt. Col. Frank Slade	Scent of a Woman	
1992 (65th)	Robert Downey Jr.	Charlie Chaplin	Chaplin	
1992 (65th)	Clint Eastwood	Will Munny	Unforgiven	
1992 (65th)	Stephen Rea	Fergus	The Crying Game	
1992 (65th)	Denzel Washington	Malcolm X	Malcolm X	
1993 (66th)	Tom Hanks ‡	Andrew Beckett	Philadelphia	
1993 (66th)	Daniel Day-Lewis	Gerard "Gerry" Conlon	In the Name of the Father	
1993 (66th)	Laurence Fishburne	Ike Turner	What's Love Got to Do with It	
1993 (66th)	Anthony Hopkins	James Stevens	The Remains of the Day	
1993 (66th)	Liam Neeson	Oskar Schindler	Schindler's List	
1994 (67th)	Tom Hanks ‡	Forrest Gump	Forrest Gump	
1994 (67th)	Morgan Freeman	Ellis Boyd "Red" Redding	The Shawshank Redemption	
1994 (67th)	Nigel Hawthorne	King George III	The Madness of King George	
1994 (67th)	Paul Newman	Donald "Sully" Sullivan	Nobody's Fool	
1994 (67th)	John Travolta	Vincent Vega	Pulp Fiction	
1995 (68th)	Nicolas Cage ‡	Ben Sanderson	Leaving Las Vegas	
1995 (68th)	Richard Dreyfuss	Glenn Holland	Mr. Holland's Opus	
1995 (68th)	Anthony Hopkins	Richard Nixon	Nixon	
1995 (68th)	Sean Penn	Matthew Poncelet	Dead Man Walking	
1995 (68th)	Massimo Troisi †	Mario Ruoppolo	Il Postino: The Postman	
1996 (69th)	Geoffrey Rush ‡	David Helfgott	Shine	
1996 (69th)	Tom Cruise	Jerry Maguire	Jerry Maguire	
1996 (69th)	Ralph Fiennes	Count László de Almásy	The English Patient	
1996 (69th)	Woody Harrelson	Larry Flynt	The People vs. Larry Flynt	
1996 (69th)	Billy Bob Thornton	Karl Childers	Sling Blade	
1997 (70th)	Jack Nicholson ‡	Melvin Udall	As Good as It Gets	
1997 (70th)	Matt Damon	Will Hunting	Good Will Hunting	
1997 (70th)	Robert Duvall	Euliss F. "Sonny" Dewey	The Apostle	
1997 (70th)	Peter Fonda	Ulysses "Ulee" Jackson	Ulee's Gold	
1997 (70th)	Dustin Hoffman	Stanley Motss	Wag the Dog	
1998 (71st)	Roberto Benigni ‡	Guido Orefice	Life Is Beautiful	
1998 (71st)	Tom Hanks	Captain John H. Miller	Saving Private Ryan	
1998 (71st)	Ian McKellen	James Whale	Gods and Monsters	
1998 (71st)	Nick Nolte	Wade Whitehouse	Affliction	
1998 (71st)	Edward Norton	Derek Vinyard	American History X	
1999 (72nd)	Kevin Spacey ‡	Lester Burnham	American Beauty	
1999 (72nd)	Russell Crowe	Jeffrey Wigand	The Insider	
1999 (72nd)	Richard Farnsworth	Alvin Straight	The Straight Story	
1999 (72nd)	Sean Penn	Emmet Ray	Sweet and Lowdown	
1999 (72nd)	Denzel Washington	Rubin "The Hurricane" Carter	The Hurricane	

=== 2000s ===
Year	Actor	Role(s)	Film	Ref.
2000 (73rd)	Russell Crowe ‡	Maximus Decimus Meridius	Gladiator	
2000 (73rd)	Javier Bardem	Reinaldo Arenas	Before Night Falls	
2000 (73rd)	Tom Hanks	Chuck Noland	Cast Away	
2000 (73rd)	Ed Harris	Jackson Pollock	Pollock	
2000 (73rd)	Geoffrey Rush	Marquis de Sade	Quills	
2001 (74th)	Denzel Washington ‡	Detective Alonzo Harris	Training Day	
2001 (74th)	Russell Crowe	John Forbes Nash Jr.	A Beautiful Mind	
2001 (74th)	Sean Penn	Sam Dawson	I Am Sam	
2001 (74th)	Will Smith	Cassius Clay / Muhammad Ali	Ali	
2001 (74th)	Tom Wilkinson	Dr. Matt Fowler	In the Bedroom	
2002 (75th)	Adrien Brody ‡	Władysław Szpilman	The Pianist	
2002 (75th)	Nicolas Cage	Charlie Kaufman & Donald Kaufman	Adaptation.	
2002 (75th)	Michael Caine	Thomas Fowler	The Quiet American	
2002 (75th)	Daniel Day-Lewis	William "Bill the Butcher" Cutting	Gangs of New York	
2002 (75th)	Jack Nicholson	Warren R. Schmidt	About Schmidt	
2003 (76th)	Sean Penn ‡	Jimmy Markum	Mystic River	
2003 (76th)	Johnny Depp	Captain Jack Sparrow	Pirates of the Caribbean: The Curse of the Black Pearl	
2003 (76th)	Ben Kingsley	Col. Massoud Amir Behrani	House of Sand and Fog	
2003 (76th)	Jude Law	William "W. P." Inman	Cold Mountain	
2003 (76th)	Bill Murray	Bob Harris	Lost in Translation	
2004 (77th)	Jamie Foxx ‡	Ray Charles	Ray	
2004 (77th)	Don Cheadle	Paul Rusesabagina	Hotel Rwanda	
2004 (77th)	Johnny Depp	Sir James Matthew Barrie	Finding Neverland	
2004 (77th)	Leonardo DiCaprio	Howard Hughes	The Aviator	
2004 (77th)	Clint Eastwood	Frankie Dunn	Million Dollar Baby	
2005 (78th)	Philip Seymour Hoffman ‡	Truman Capote	Capote	
2005 (78th)	Terrence Howard	DJay	Hustle & Flow	
2005 (78th)	Heath Ledger	Ennis Del Mar	Brokeback Mountain	
2005 (78th)	Joaquin Phoenix	Johnny Cash	Walk the Line	
2005 (78th)	David Strathairn	Edward R. Murrow	Good Night, and Good Luck	
2006 (79th)	Forest Whitaker ‡	Idi Amin	The Last King of Scotland	
2006 (79th)	Leonardo DiCaprio	Danny Archer	Blood Diamond	
2006 (79th)	Ryan Gosling	Dan Dunne	Half Nelson	
2006 (79th)	Peter O'Toole	Maurice Russell	Venus	
2006 (79th)	Will Smith	Chris Gardner	The Pursuit of Happyness	
2007 (80th)	Daniel Day-Lewis ‡	Daniel Plainview	There Will Be Blood	
2007 (80th)	George Clooney	Michael Clayton	Michael Clayton	
2007 (80th)	Johnny Depp	Sweeney Todd / Benjamin Barker	Sweeney Todd: The Demon Barber of Fleet Street	
2007 (80th)	Tommy Lee Jones	Hank Deerfield	In the Valley of Elah	
2007 (80th)	Viggo Mortensen	Nikolai Luzhin	Eastern Promises	
2008 (81st)	Sean Penn ‡	Harvey Milk	Milk	
2008 (81st)	Richard Jenkins	Walter Vale	The Visitor	
2008 (81st)	Frank Langella	Richard Nixon	Frost/Nixon	
2008 (81st)	Brad Pitt	Benjamin Button	The Curious Case of Benjamin Button	
2008 (81st)	Mickey Rourke	Randy "The Ram" Robinson	The Wrestler	
2009 (82nd)	Jeff Bridges ‡	Otis "Bad" Blake	Crazy Heart	
2009 (82nd)	George Clooney	Ryan Bingham	Up in the Air	
2009 (82nd)	Colin Firth	George Falconer	A Single Man	
2009 (82nd)	Morgan Freeman	Nelson Mandela	Invictus	
2009 (82nd)	Jeremy Renner	SFC William James	The Hurt Locker	

=== 2010s ===
Year	Actor	Role(s)	Film	Ref.
2010 (83rd)	Colin Firth ‡	King George VI	The King's Speech	
2010 (83rd)	Javier Bardem	Uxbal	Biutiful	
2010 (83rd)	Jeff Bridges	Reuben "Rooster" Cogburn	True Grit	
2010 (83rd)	Jesse Eisenberg	Mark Zuckerberg	The Social Network	
2010 (83rd)	James Franco	Aron Ralston	127 Hours	
2011 (84th)	Jean Dujardin ‡	George Valentin	The Artist	
2011 (84th)	Demián Bichir	Carlos Galindo	A Better Life	
2011 (84th)	George Clooney	Matt King	The Descendants	
2011 (84th)	Gary Oldman	George Smiley	Tinker Tailor Soldier Spy	
2011 (84th)	Brad Pitt	Billy Beane	Moneyball	
2012 (85th)	Daniel Day-Lewis ‡	Abraham Lincoln	Lincoln	
2012 (85th)	Bradley Cooper	Patrizio "Pat" Solitano Jr.	Silver Linings Playbook	
2012 (85th)	Hugh Jackman	Jean Valjean	Les Misérables	
2012 (85th)	Joaquin Phoenix	Freddie Quell	The Master	
2012 (85th)	Denzel Washington	William "Whip" Whitaker	Flight	
2013 (86th)	Matthew McConaughey ‡	Ron Woodroof	Dallas Buyers Club	
2013 (86th)	Christian Bale	Irving Rosenfeld	American Hustle	
2013 (86th)	Bruce Dern	Woodrow "Woody" Grant	Nebraska	
2013 (86th)	Leonardo DiCaprio	Jordan Belfort	The Wolf of Wall Street	
2013 (86th)	Chiwetel Ejiofor	Solomon Northup	12 Years a Slave	
2014 (87th)	Eddie Redmayne ‡	Stephen Hawking	The Theory of Everything	
2014 (87th)	Steve Carell	John du Pont	Foxcatcher	
2014 (87th)	Bradley Cooper	Chris Kyle	American Sniper	
2014 (87th)	Benedict Cumberbatch	Alan Turing	The Imitation Game	
2014 (87th)	Michael Keaton	Riggan Thomson	Birdman	
2015 (88th)	Leonardo DiCaprio ‡	Hugh Glass	The Revenant	
2015 (88th)	Bryan Cranston	Dalton Trumbo	Trumbo	
2015 (88th)	Matt Damon	Mark Watney	The Martian	
2015 (88th)	Michael Fassbender	Steve Jobs	Steve Jobs	
2015 (88th)	Eddie Redmayne	Lili Elbe	The Danish Girl	
2016 (89th)	Casey Affleck ‡	Lee Chandler	Manchester by the Sea	
2016 (89th)	Andrew Garfield	Desmond Doss	Hacksaw Ridge	
2016 (89th)	Ryan Gosling	Sebastian Wilder	La La Land	
2016 (89th)	Viggo Mortensen	Ben Cash	Captain Fantastic	
2016 (89th)	Denzel Washington	Troy Maxson	Fences	
2017 (90th)	Gary Oldman ‡	Winston Churchill	Darkest Hour	
2017 (90th)	Timothée Chalamet	Elio Perlman	Call Me by Your Name	
2017 (90th)	Daniel Day-Lewis	Reynolds Woodcock	Phantom Thread	
2017 (90th)	Daniel Kaluuya	Chris Washington	Get Out	
2017 (90th)	Denzel Washington	Roman J. Israel	Roman J. Israel, Esq.	
2018 (91st)	Rami Malek ‡	Freddie Mercury	Bohemian Rhapsody	
2018 (91st)	Christian Bale	Dick Cheney	Vice	
2018 (91st)	Bradley Cooper	Jackson Maine	A Star Is Born	
2018 (91st)	Willem Dafoe	Vincent van Gogh	At Eternity's Gate	
2018 (91st)	Viggo Mortensen	Anthony "Tony Lip" Vallelonga	Green Book	
2019 (92nd)	Joaquin Phoenix ‡	Arthur Fleck / Joker	Joker	
2019 (92nd)	Antonio Banderas	Salvador Mallo	Pain and Glory	
2019 (92nd)	Leonardo DiCaprio	Rick Dalton	Once Upon a Time in Hollywood	
2019 (92nd)	Adam Driver	Charlie Barber	Marriage Story	
2019 (92nd)	Jonathan Pryce	Cardinal Jorge Mario Bergoglio	The Two Popes	

=== 2020s ===
Year	Actor	Role(s)	Film	Ref.
2020/21 (93rd)	Anthony Hopkins ‡	Anthony	The Father	
2020/21 (93rd)	Riz Ahmed	Ruben Stone	Sound of Metal	
2020/21 (93rd)	Chadwick Boseman †	Levee Green	Ma Rainey's Black Bottom	
2020/21 (93rd)	Gary Oldman	Herman J. Mankiewicz	Mank	
2020/21 (93rd)	Steven Yeun	Jacob Yi	Minari	
2021 (94th)	Will Smith ‡	Richard Williams	King Richard	
2021 (94th)	Javier Bardem	Desi Arnaz	Being the Ricardos	
2021 (94th)	Benedict Cumberbatch	Phil Burbank	The Power of the Dog	
2021 (94th)	Andrew Garfield	Jonathan Larson	Tick, Tick... Boom!	
2021 (94th)	Denzel Washington	Lord Macbeth	The Tragedy of Macbeth	
2022 (95th)	Brendan Fraser ‡	Charlie	The Whale	
2022 (95th)	Austin Butler	Elvis Presley	Elvis	
2022 (95th)	Colin Farrell	Pádraic Súilleabháin	The Banshees of Inisherin	
2022 (95th)	Paul Mescal	Calum Patterson	Aftersun	
2022 (95th)	Bill Nighy	Rodney Williams	Living	
2023 (96th)	Cillian Murphy ‡	J. Robert Oppenheimer	Oppenheimer	
2023 (96th)	Bradley Cooper	Leonard Bernstein	Maestro	
2023 (96th)	Colman Domingo	Bayard Rustin	Rustin	
2023 (96th)	Paul Giamatti	Paul Hunham	The Holdovers	
2023 (96th)	Jeffrey Wright	Thelonious "Monk" Ellison	American Fiction	
2024 (97th)	Adrien Brody ‡	László Tóth	The Brutalist	
2024 (97th)	Timothée Chalamet	Bob Dylan	A Complete Unknown	
2024 (97th)	Colman Domingo	John "Divine G" Whitfield	Sing Sing	
2024 (97th)	Ralph Fiennes	Cardinal Thomas Lawrence	Conclave	
2024 (97th)	Sebastian Stan	Donald Trump	The Apprentice	
2025 (98th)	Michael B. Jordan ‡	Elijah "Smoke" Moore / Elias "Stack" Moore	Sinners	
2025 (98th)	Timothée Chalamet	Marty Mauser	Marty Supreme	
2025 (98th)	Leonardo DiCaprio	Bob Ferguson	One Battle After Another	
2025 (98th)	Ethan Hawke	Lorenz Hart	Blue Moon	
2025 (98th)	Wagner Moura	Armando Solimões / Marcelo Alves / Fernando Solimões	The Secret Agent	

== Multiple awards and nominations ==
The following individuals won two or more Academy Awards for Best Actor:

Wins	Actor	Nominations	Years won
3	Daniel Day-Lewis	6	1989, 2007, 2012
2	Spencer Tracy	9	1937, 1938
2	Jack Nicholson	8	1975, 1997
2	Marlon Brando	7	1954, 1972
2	Dustin Hoffman	7	1979, 1988
2	Gary Cooper	5	1941, 1952
2	Tom Hanks	5	1993, 1994
2	Fredric March	5	1931-32, 1946
2	Sean Penn	5	2003, 2008
2	Anthony Hopkins	4	1991, 2020
2	Adrien Brody	2	2002, 2024

The following individuals received three or more Best Actor nominations:

Nominations	Actor
9	Laurence Olivier
9	Spencer Tracy
8	Paul Newman
8	Jack Nicholson
8	Peter O'Toole
7	Marlon Brando
7	Dustin Hoffman
7	Jack Lemmon
7	Denzel Washington
6	Richard Burton
6	Daniel Day-Lewis
6	Leonardo DiCaprio
6	Paul Muni
5	Gary Cooper
5	Robert De Niro
5	Tom Hanks
5	Fredric March
5	Al Pacino
5	Gregory Peck
5	Sean Penn
5	James Stewart
4	Warren Beatty
4	Charles Boyer
4	Michael Caine
4	Bradley Cooper
4	Albert Finney
4	Anthony Hopkins
4	Burt Lancaster
3	Javier Bardem
3	Humphrey Bogart
3	Jeff Bridges
3	James Cagney
3	Timothée Chalamet
3	Montgomery Clift
3	George Clooney
3	Ronald Colman
3	Bing Crosby
3	Russell Crowe
3	Johnny Depp
3	Kirk Douglas
3	Robert Duvall
3	Morgan Freeman
3	Clark Gable
3	William Holden
3	William Hurt
3	Charles Laughton
3	Marcello Mastroianni
3	Viggo Mortensen
3	Gary Oldman
3	Joaquin Phoenix
3	William Powell
3	Will Smith
3	Jon Voight
3	Robin Williams

== Age superlatives ==
Record	Actor	Film	Year	Age	Ref.
Oldest Winner	Anthony Hopkins	The Father	2020	83	
Oldest Nominee	Anthony Hopkins	The Father	2020	83	
Youngest Winner	Adrien Brody	The Pianist	2002	29	
Youngest Nominee	Jackie Cooper	Skippy	1931	9	

== Films with multiple Leading Actor nominations ==
Winners are in bold.

- Mutiny on the Bounty (1935) – Clark Gable, Charles Laughton, and Franchot Tone
- Going My Way (1944) – **Bing Crosby** and Barry Fitzgerald
- From Here to Eternity (1953) – Montgomery Clift and Burt Lancaster
- Giant (1956) – James Dean and Rock Hudson
- The Defiant Ones (1958) – Tony Curtis and Sidney Poitier
- Judgment at Nuremberg (1961) – **Maximilian Schell** and Spencer Tracy
- Becket (1964) – Richard Burton and Peter O'Toole
- Midnight Cowboy (1969) – Dustin Hoffman and Jon Voight
- Sleuth (1972) – Michael Caine and Laurence Olivier
- Network (1976) – **Peter Finch** and William Holden
- The Dresser (1983) – Tom Courtenay and Albert Finney
- Amadeus (1984) – **F. Murray Abraham** and Tom Hulce

== Multiple character nominations ==
The following were nominated for their portrayals of the same fictional or non-fictional character in separate films (including variations of the original).

Winners are in bold.

- Cyrano de Bergerac from Cyrano de Bergerac (**José Ferrer**, 1950) and Cyrano de Bergerac (Gérard Depardieu, 1990)
- Eddie "Fast Eddie" Felson from The Hustler (Paul Newman, 1961) and The Color of Money (**Paul Newman**, 1986)
- Father Chuck O'Malley from Going My Way (**Bing Crosby**, 1944) and The Bells of St. Mary's (Bing Crosby, 1945)
- Joe Pendleton from Here Comes Mr. Jordan (Robert Montgomery, 1941) and Heaven Can Wait (Warren Beatty, 1978)
- King Henry II from Becket (Peter O'Toole, 1964) and The Lion in Winter (Peter O'Toole, 1968)
- King Henry V from Henry V (Laurence Olivier, 1946) and Henry V (Kenneth Branagh, 1989)
- King Henry VIII from The Private Life of Henry VIII (**Charles Laughton**, 1933) and Anne of the Thousand Days (Richard Burton, 1969)
- Mr. Chipping from Goodbye, Mr. Chips (**Robert Donat**, 1939) and Goodbye, Mr. Chips (Peter O'Toole, 1969)
- Norman Maine (né Hinkle/né Ernest (Sidney) Gubbins) from A Star Is Born (Fredric March, 1937) and A Star Is Born (James Mason, 1954)
  - Jackson "Jack" Maine from A Star Is Born (Bradley Cooper, 2018)
- President Abraham Lincoln from Abe Lincoln in Illinois (Raymond Massey, 1940) and Lincoln (**Daniel Day-Lewis**, 2012)
- President Richard Nixon from Nixon (Anthony Hopkins, 1995) and Frost/Nixon (Frank Langella, 2008)
- Professor Henry Higgins from Pygmalion (Leslie Howard, 1938) and My Fair Lady (**Rex Harrison**, 1964)
- Rooster Cogburn from True Grit (**John Wayne**, 1969) and True Grit (Jeff Bridges, 2010)
- Vincent van Gogh from Lust for Life (Kirk Douglas, 1956) and At Eternity's Gate (Willem Dafoe, 2018)

== See also ==
- Academy Award for Best Actress
- Actor Award for Outstanding Performance by a Male Actor in a Leading Role
- BAFTA Award for Best Actor in a Leading Role
- Best Actor
- César Award for Best Actor
- Critics' Choice Movie Award for Best Actor
- Golden Globe Award for Best Actor in a Motion Picture – Drama
- Golden Globe Award for Best Actor in a Motion Picture – Musical or Comedy
- Independent Spirit Award for Best Lead Performance
- Lists of acting awards
- List of actors with Academy Award nominations
- List of actors with more than one Academy Award nomination in the acting categories
- List of actors with two or more Academy Awards in acting categories
- List of film awards for lead actor

== Notes ==
A: According to longstanding Hollywood legend, reported by Susan Orlean, Rin Tin Tin actually received the most Best Actor votes, but the Academy (not wishing to give the first award to a dog) refactored the votes to ensure that Jannings won.
B:The Circus originally received three nominations: Best Director (Comedy Picture), Best Actor, and Best Writing (Original Story) – for Charles Chaplin. However, the Academy subsequently decided to remove Chaplin's name from the competitive award categories and instead to confer upon him a Special Award "for acting, writing, directing and producing The Circus".
C^{1} ^{2} ^{3} : Rules at the time of the first three ceremonies allowed for a performer to receive a single nomination which could honor his or her work in more than one film. George Arliss, Maurice Chevalier, and Ronald Colman were all nominated for two different roles in the same category. Current Academy rules forbid this from happening. No official reason was ever given as to why Arliss won the award for only one of the two films he was listed for.
D^{1} ^{2} : Fredric March received one more vote than Wallace Beery. Academy rules at that time considered such a close margin to be a tie, so both March and Beery received the award. Currently, Academy rules stipulate that a tie must result from exactly the same number of votes.
E: As in the previous year when the Academy relaxed the rules to allow write-in votes following the outcry over Bette Davis's snub for Of Human Bondage, the Academy permitted write-in votes for that year as well. Thus, Paul Muni received a write-in nomination for his performance in Black Fury and actually finished second in the votes. Although as with Davis the previous year, the Academy did not recognize these two as "official nominees", they are nevertheless listed on the official website amongst their respective years' nominations for posterity's sake.
F: Due to category confusion, Barry Fitzgerald received nominations (each for the same performance as Father Fitzgibbon in Going My Way) in both the leading and supporting actor categories for 1944, winning the Oscar for the latter. As a result of this confusion, the Academy amended its rules so that if any actor or actress received enough votes to qualify as one of the final five nominees for both again, the performer would only receive the nomination for the category in which he or she obtained the larger percentage of the votes.

== Bibliography ==
- Crouse, Richard (2005). Reel Winners: Movie Award Trivia. Toronto, Ontario, Canada: University of Toronto Press. ISBN 978-1-55002-574-3.
- Levy, Emanuel (2003), All About Oscar: The History and Politics of the Academy Awards, New York, United States: Continuum International Publishing Group, ISBN 978-0-82641-452-6
- Orlean, Susan (2011). Rin Tin Tin: The Life and the Legend. New York, United States: Simon & Schuster. ISBN 978-1-43919-015-9.
- Osborne, Robert (2013). 85 Years of the Oscar: The Complete History of the Academy Awards. New York, United States: Abbeville Publishing Group. ISBN 978-078921-142-2.
- Thise, Mark (2008), Hollywood Winners & Losers A to Z, New York, United States: Limelight Editions, ISBN 978-0-87910-351-4
- Wiley, Mason; Bona, Damien (1996), Inside Oscar: The Unofficial History of the Academy Awards (5 ed.), New York, United States: Ballantine Books, ISBN 978-0-34540-053-6, OCLC 779680732
