= Martin Snyder =

Jewish-American gangster (1893–1981)

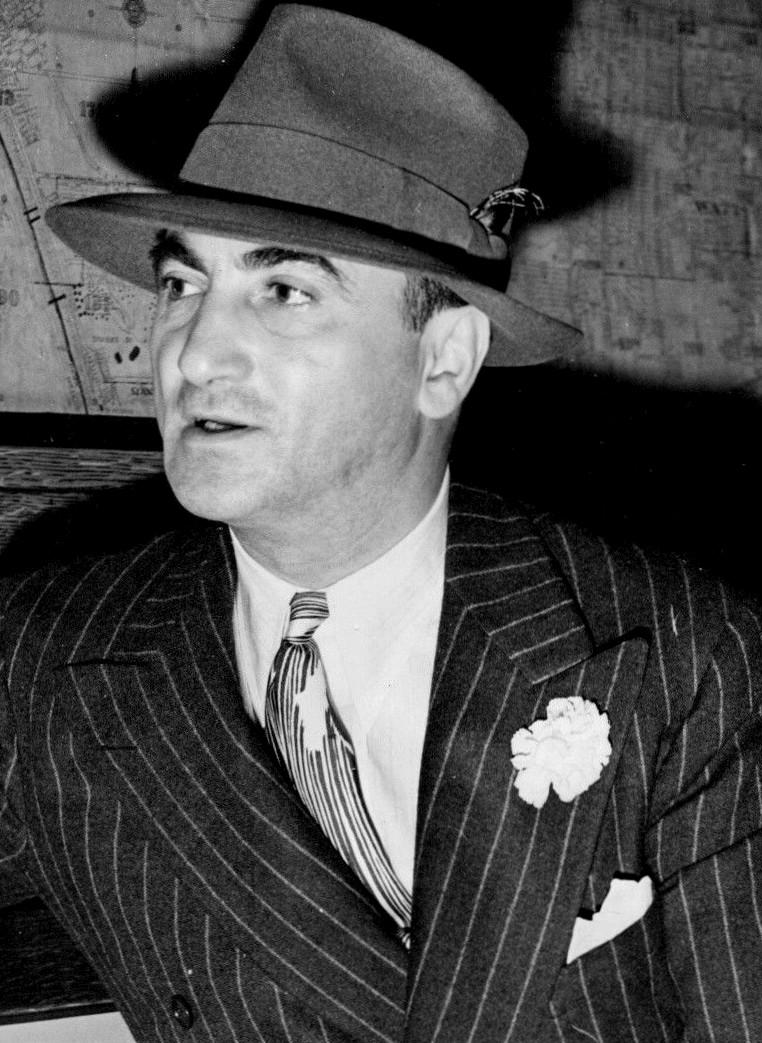
Snyder in 1938

Martin "Moe" Snyder (December 6, 1893 – November 9, 1981), (Note: Snyder said he was 44 years old at his attempted murder trial in 1938.) commonly known as Moe the Gimp due to his lame left leg, was an American gangster from Chicago, active in the 1920s and 1930s.

== Biography ==
Snyder was born and raised on Chicago's southwest side. He was five years of age when he injured his leg in an accident. Snyder left school after the fourth grade and sold papers as a newsboy. He later worked in newspaper circulation, and then moved to a job with the Metropolitan Sanitary District.

Snyder had both political and entertainment world connections. He knew most of the nightclubs in Chicago and the people who performed there. He once served as a bodyguard for Al Jolson. His second wife was the singer and entertainer Ruth Etting, whom he married in 1922 and whose career he aggressively promoted. (Note: Snyder's aggressive behavior was well-known among those who had worked with Etting. It was said that most people working on Broadway were afraid of him. Ed Sullivan described Snyder as viewing the world as a battleground in the 1930s.) Snyder and Etting met when she was performing at the Marigold Gardens. He divorced his first wife to marry Etting.

In 1927, the couple moved to New York City, where Etting landed a role in the Ziegfeld Follies. After a move to Los Angeles in the early 1930s, Etting was hired for some film roles, and The Chase and Sanborn Hour radio show with Jimmy Durante. Etting remained in Los Angeles for her radio work, while Snyder returned to Chicago.

== Divorce and shooting ==
By 1934, the aggressive and controlling management of Snyder began to create professional problems for Etting. She was not being considered for many jobs due to Snyder's arguments with those who employed her. Etting visited England for work in 1936, where Snyder managed to involve himself in a street fight soon after their arrival; this resulted in unfavorable publicity for Etting. Etting divorced Snyder on the grounds of cruelty and abandonment on November 30, 1937. Snyder did not contest the divorce; he received a settlement from Etting. (Note: Snyder received half of Etting's earnings at the time, $50,000, some securities and half interest in a home in Beverly Hills, California. Etting deducted the gambling debts of Snyder's she had paid and the cost of a home for Snyder's mother from the settlement.)

In January 1938, Snyder began making threatening telephone calls to Etting, at first claiming she concealed assets from him when the divorce settlement was made. Snyder was also upset that Etting was now seeing her accompanist, Myrl Alderman. Snyder told Etting he intended to come to California and kill her. (Note: Snyder continued to claim he was cheated in the settlement even after shooting Myrl Alderman. When he spoke with his daughter on the telephone, Snyder also threatened her, saying he "would fix her ticket too".) Etting obtained both police and private protection, but apparently believed the danger was past when Snyder did not appear soon after his telephone threats; she dismissed her bodyguards.

Snyder detained Myrl Alderman at a local radio station on October 15, 1938. He forced the pianist to drive him to his former wife at gunpoint. Etting and Edith Snyder, his daughter, were in the house when Snyder and Alderman arrived. When Snyder was told Edith was in another part of the house, he forced Etting to call her into the music room, where he held Etting and Alderman at gunpoint. Snyder told them to be quiet and that he intended to kill them all. When Myrl Alderman tried to speak, he was shot by Snyder, who then told Etting, "I've had my revenge, so you can call the police."

Etting, who said the only gun in the house was hers, was able to go into her bedroom for the gun after the shooting of Alderman. When Snyder saw Etting with the gun, he wrestled it away from her; it fell to the floor where Edith Snyder picked it up and started shooting at her father. Edith's shots did not hit her father, but went into the floor. Snyder's daughter said she shot at her father to save Ruth Etting. (Note: At the police reenactment of the shooting three days later, Edith Snyder wept as she said, "I don't yet know whether I am sorry I missed my Dad or whether I am glad".)

== Charges and trial ==
Snyder was charged with kidnapping Myrl Alderman and the attempted murder of Alderman, Etting, and his daughter, Edith, as well as California state gun violations. Snyder claimed that Myrl Alderman had a gun and shot at him first. He also said that Ruth Etting would not press charges against him because she was still in love with him. Snyder said he was drunk when he made the threatening calls to Etting and at that time, his intentions were to kill Etting and himself.

During Snyder's trial for the attempted murder of Myrl Alderman, Etting and Alderman were married in Las Vegas. Snyder was found guilty and sentenced, but was released on appeal after a year in prison. In January 1940, he won a new trial, but was returned to jail in lieu of bail. In August 1940, Myrl Alderman asked the district attorney to drop further prosecution attempts against Snyder for the 1938 shooting at Etting's request, wanting to move on with their lives.

== Later life ==
Snyder returned to Chicago in 1940 and worked in the mail room at Chicago's City Hall. He was still living in Chicago and working in the City Clerk's office in 1972. In 1975, Snyder was interviewed for a Chicago Tribune article about the 1930s, where he claimed the stories about his mob connections were untrue. Snyder said he worked for a song publisher and that he knew various celebrities through that work.

Snyder had at least one child from his first marriage, a daughter, Edith. After her father and Etting were divorced, she remained living with her. Edith died of a heart condition in 1939. It is believed Snyder died in Chicago in 1981.

== Portrayal in film ==
Along with Ruth Etting and Myrl Alderman, Snyder sold his rights to his story to MGM for the film Love Me or Leave Me (1955). James Cagney portrayed Snyder in the film, which was a fictionalized life story of Etting, who was played by Doris Day. Snyder was very dissatisfied with the way he was portrayed in the film.
