= Daniel Fuchs =

American writer (1909–1993)

Daniel Fuchs (June 25, 1909 – July 26, 1993) was an American screenwriter, fiction writer, and essayist.

== Biography ==
Daniel Fuchs was born to a Jewish family on the Lower East Side, Manhattan, but his family moved to Williamsburg, Brooklyn while Fuchs was an infant. He wrote three early novels, published by the Vanguard Press — Summer in Williamsburg (1934), Homage to Blenholt (1936), and Low Company (1937). The earlier two of these depicted Jewish life in Williamsburg; the last focused on various ethnic types in Brighton Beach. A single-volume edition of these was published by Basic Books in 1965 under the title "Three Novels." Subsequent one-volume editions include The Brooklyn Novels, with an introduction by the novelist Jonathan Lethem, published in 2006 by Black Sparrow Books, an imprint since 2002 of David R. Godine, Publisher.

Homage to Blenholt concerns a well-meaning tenement schlemiel who hopes to escape poverty via various inventions and get-rich quick schemes. Fuchs also wrote short stories and personal essays, mainly for The New Yorker. When he was 26, he moved to Los Angeles, California to work on films.

Fuchs wrote the screenplay for the crime noir Criss Cross (1949). He also penned the psychodrama Panic in the Streets (1950), which was directed by Elia Kazan. In 1995, Criss Cross was remade as The Underneath by director Steven Soderbergh, with credit given to Fuchs. Love Me or Leave Me, a biopic about the torch singer Ruth Etting, which won Fuchs an Oscar for Best Story in 1955, featured a performance by James Cagney in the role of a Chicago hoodlum and Doris Day as the beleaguered songstress.

Fuchs' Hollywood novel, West of the Rockies, was published in 1971, and in 1979 appeared a collection of mostly earlier-written short stories, The Apathetic Bookie Joint. The Golden West: Hollywood Stories, a collection of Fuchs's fiction and essays about Hollywood, was published in 2005 by Black Sparrow Books.

Fuchs died in Los Angeles.

== Critique ==
Irving Howe wrote of Fuchs for Commentary Magazine in 1948 that "he showed such a rich gift for fictional portraiture of Jewish life in the American city that, given sustained work and growth of mind, he might have written its still-uncreated comedie humaine. After reading Fuchs' work one wonders: What was the source of his talent and the cause of his silence, and, perhaps more important, what was the relationship between his talent and his silence?"

John Updike said, "Nobody else writes like Daniel Fuchs. I think of him as a natural—a poet who never had to strain after a poetic effect, a magician who made magic look almost too easy."

== Works ==
=== Novels ===
Fuchs's early novels were published by the Vanguard Press; he was represented by the Maxim Lieber Literary Agency, and handled by agent Elizabeth Nowell (who later became Thomas Wolfe's exclusive agent).

- Summer in Williamsburg (1934)
- Homage to Blenholt (1936)
- Low Company (1937)
- Three Novels (1965): omnibus of earlier novels
- West of the Rockies (1971)

=== Collections ===
- Stories, with Jean Stafford, John Cheever, and William Maxwell (1956)
- The Apathetic Bookie Joint (1979)
- The Golden West: Hollywood Stories (2005)

=== Scripts ===
- The Hard Way (1943)
- Between Two Worlds (1944)
- The Gangster (1947), based on his own novel Low Company
- Hollow Triumph (1948)
- Criss Cross (1949)
- Panic in the Streets (1950)
- Storm Warning (1951)
- The Human Jungle (1954)
- Love Me Or Leave Me (1955)
- Jeanne Eagels (1957)
- Interlude (1957)

=== Short fiction ===
Title	Publication	Collected in
"Where Al Capone Grew Up"	The New Republic (September 9, 1931)	-
"The Village by the Sea"	Opinion (April 11, 1932)	-
"Pioneers! O Pioneers!"	Story (December 1933)	-
"Dream City, or The Drugged Lake"	Cinema Arts (Summer 1937)	The Golden West: Hollywood Stories
"My Sister Who Is Famous"	Collier's (September 4, 1937)	-
"Crap Game"	The New Yorker (December 25, 1937)	-
"The Amazing Mystery at Storick, Dorschi, Pflaumer, Inc."	Scribner's Magazine (February 1938)	The Apathetic Bookie Joint
"Last Fall"	The Saturday Evening Post (March 5, 1938)	-
"Such a Nice Spring Day"	Collier's (April 23, 1938)	-
"Shun All Care"	Harper's Bazaar (May 1938)	-
"A Hollywood Diary"	The New Yorker (August 6, 1938)	The Apathetic Bookie Joint
"The Apathetic Bookie Joint"	The New Yorker (August 20, 1938)	The Apathetic Bookie Joint
"Getaway Day"	Collier's (September 10, 1938)	-
"People on a Planet"	The New Yorker (September 24, 1938)	The Apathetic Bookie Joint
"Lucky Loser"	Collier's (October 15, 1938)	-
"Kinds of Laughter" aka "A Matter of Pride"	Collier's (October 22, 1938)	The Apathetic Bookie Joint
"Life Sentence"	Collier's (November 19, 1938)	-
"Give Hollywood a Chance"	Esquire (December 1938)	-
"Fortune and Men's Eyes"	The Saturday Evening Post (December 10, 1938)	-
"A Girl Like Cele"	Redbook (April 1939)	-
"The Woman in Buffalo"	Esquire (April 1939)	-
"The Man from Mars"	The New Yorker (April 8, 1939)	The Apathetic Bookie Joint
"If a Man Answers, Hang Up"	Collier's (April 22, 1939)	-
"Crazy Over Pigeons"	Collier's (April 29, 1939)	-
"Not to the Swift"	Collier's (May 13, 1939)	-
"Florida" aka "Toilers of the Screen"	Collier's (July 8, 1939)	The Golden West: Hollywood Stories
"The Hosiery Shop"	Harper's Bazaar (September 1939)	The Apathetic Bookie Joint
"Love in Brooklyn"	The New Yorker (September 2, 1939)	The Apathetic Bookie Joint
"The Politician"	The New Republic (October 11, 1939)	-
"All or Nothing"	Collier's (October 14, 1939)	-
"The Morose Policeman"	The New Yorker (October 14, 1939)	The Apathetic Bookie Joint
"No Regrets"	This Week (January 21, 1940)	-
"A Mink Coat Each Morning"	Collier's (January 27, 1940)	-
"There's Always Honolulu"	This Week (January 21, 1940)	The Apathetic Bookie Joint
"Pug in an Opera Hat"	Collier's (March 23, 1940)	-
"The First Smell of Spring, and Brooklyn"	Mademoiselle (April 1940)	The Apathetic Bookie Joint
"Daring Young Man"	Collier's (August 24, 1940)	-
"All the Tricks"	Collier's (September 14, 1940)	-
"The Sun Goes Down"	The New Yorker (September 14, 1940)	The Apathetic Bookie Joint
"Racing Is a Business"	Collier's (October 5, 1940)	-
"The Language of Love"	The New Yorker (December 14, 1940)	The Apathetic Bookie Joint
"The Fabulous Rubio"	Collier's (January 4, 1941)	-
"Strange Things Happen in Brooklyn"	Collier's (February 1, 1941)	-
"Loew's Kings, the Chink's, and a Ride Home"	The New Yorker (April 5, 1941)	The Apathetic Bookie Joint
"Okay, Mr. Pappendas, Okay"	The Southern Review (Spring 1942)	The Apathetic Bookie Joint
"A Clean, Quiet House"	The New Yorker (May 30, 1942)	The Apathetic Bookie Joint
"The Long Green"	Cosmopolitan (February 1951)	-
"Man in the Middle of the Ocean"	The New Yorker (July 11, 1953)	Stories
"Ecossaise, Berceuse, Polonaise"	The New Yorker (August 1, 1953)	The Apathetic Bookie Joint
"Twilight in Southern California"	The New Yorker (October 3, 1953)	Stories
"The Golden West"	The New Yorker (July 10, 1954)	Stories
"Ivanov's 'The Adventures of a Fakir'"	Commentary (June 1975)	The Apathetic Bookie Joint
"Triplicate"	The Apathetic Bookie Joint (1979)	The Apathetic Bookie Joint

== Awards ==
- 1980: National Jewish Book Award for The Apathetic Bookie Joint
