= Storm Warning (1950 film) =

1950 film by Stuart Heisler

- Theatrical release poster
- Directed by: Stuart Heisler
- Written by: Richard Brooks; Daniel Fuchs
- Produced by: Jerry Wald
- Starring: Ginger Rogers; Ronald Reagan; Doris Day; Steve Cochran
- Cinematography: Carl Guthrie
- Edited by: Clarence Kolster
- Music by: Daniele Amfitheatrof
- Distributed by: Warner Bros. Pictures
- Release dates: December 20, 1950 (Pittsburgh); February 10, 1951 (U.S.)
- Running time: 93 minutes
- Country: United States
- Language: English
- Box office: $1.25 million (US/Canada rentals)

Storm Warning is a 1950 (Note: While some sources such as the American Film Institute classify the film as a 1951 production (the year in which it had its first wide theatrical release), this is technically incorrect as it was first released to the public on December 20, 1950. Numerous sources support the year of 1950.) American thriller film noir starring Ginger Rogers, Ronald Reagan, Doris Day, and Steve Cochran. Directed by Stuart Heisler, it follows a fashion model (Rogers), traveling to a small Southern town to visit her sister (Day), who witnesses the brutal murder of an investigative journalist by the Ku Klux Klan (KKK). The original screenplay was written by Richard Brooks and Daniel Fuchs.

Filmed in Corona, California in late 1949, Storm Warning premiered in Pittsburgh, Pennsylvania on December 20, 1950, before receiving an expanded theatrical release in the United States on February 10, 1951. The film earned $1.25 million in North America, and was a box-office flop.

In the years since its original release, it has been subject to analysis by film scholars as an allegory for the House Un-American Activities Committee investigations, while both contemporary and modern critics have noted that its depiction of the KKK does not address the organization's predominant racist origins. Despite this, the film's performances (particularly Rogers', appearing in a rare dramatic role) and direction have been widely lauded.

== Plot ==
In December 1949, Marsha Mitchell, a dress model from New York City, travels by bus for a work assignment. During her journey, she stops in the small Southern town of Rock Point to visit her newlywed sister, Lucy Rice. Upon arrival, Marsha senses the townspeople's hostility, exhibited through their evasive and unwelcoming behavior. As she walks along the main street, she hears a disturbance at the nearby police station. Hiding in the shadows, Marsha witnesses an intoxicated, violent KKK mob break a man out of jail and fatally shoot him as he attempts to flee. She observes two of the mob members unmasking themselves and sees their faces.

Deeply shaken, Marsha seeks refuge at the bowling alley where her sister works. She recounts the events to Lucy, who surmises that the victim was Walter Adams, a journalist who had recently arrived in town. Adams had been investigating and exposing the local Klan chapter's activities. Lucy explains that he had been arrested on false charges, and the mob had likely intended to silence him permanently. Marsha is taken to Lucy's home, where she is encouraged to tell her brother-in-law, Hank, what she witnessed. However, when Hank arrives, Marsha immediately recognizes him as one of the unmasked Klansmen. Though Hank initially denies any involvement, he soon admits his presence at the scene, claiming he had been coerced and intoxicated. Hank insists that the mob's intention was not to kill Adams but to prevent him from further damaging the town's reputation. He pleads with Marsha to remain silent to protect his marriage and Lucy, who is pregnant. Reluctantly, Marsha agrees to leave town the next morning and forget what she witnessed.

Meanwhile, District Attorney Burt Rainey begins an investigation into the murder. Skeptical of the police's explanation that they were overpowered by the mob, Rainey suspects collusion between the authorities and the Klan. He questions Charlie Barr, the Imperial Wizard of the local Klan chapter, but receives no useful information. Learning of Marsha's presence in town, Rainey insists on meeting her and questioning her about the incident. Despite pressure from the townspeople to drop the investigation, Rainey remains committed to pursuing justice. When Marsha meets with Rainey, she provides a partial account, stating that she saw the Klansmen but did not recognize their faces due to their hoods. Rainey deems this enough to proceed with an investigation and serves her with a subpoena to testify at the inquest later that day. Under pressure from both Lucy and the Klan, Marsha lies during her testimony, leading the coroner's jury to rule that Adams was killed by unknown assailants.

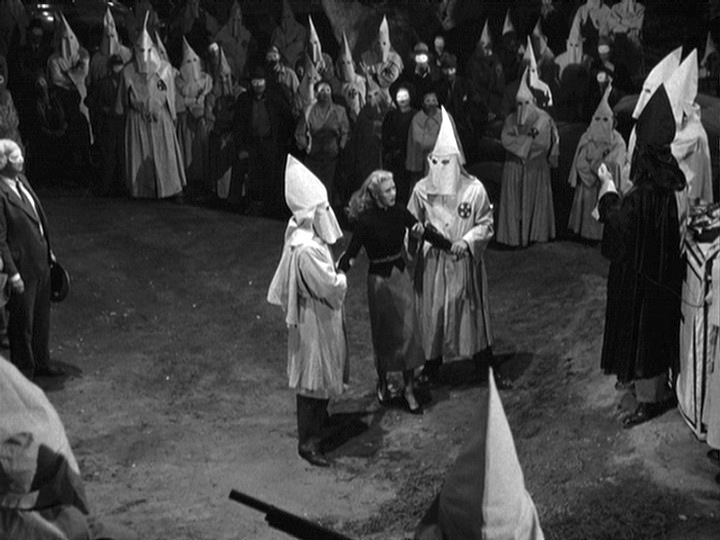
Marsha (center), played by Ginger Rogers, in the film's climactic finale

The Klan and its sympathizers celebrate at the local bowling alley, while Marsha, consumed by guilt, prepares to leave town. However, her departure is interrupted by a drunken Hank, who returns home and attempts to sexually assault her. Lucy intervenes, and denounces Hank, realizing the extent of his involvement. Marsha, now determined to tell the truth, declares her intent to report Hank's role in the murder to Rainey and the police. In a fit of rage, Hank kidnaps Marsha and takes her to a Klan rally, where she is beaten until Lucy, Rainey, and the authorities arrive to rescue her. Desperate, Barr attempts to shift the blame to Hank, naming him as the murderer. In the ensuing chaos, Hank seizes a gun, condemns the townspeople, and shoots Lucy. A police officer then fatally shoots Hank. As the remaining Klansmen, disillusioned, flee the scene and discard their robes, Barr is arrested. Lucy dies in Marsha's arms beneath the smoldering remains of a burning cross.

== Cast ==
- Ginger Rogers as Marsha Mitchell
- Ronald Reagan as Burt Rainey
- Doris Day as Lucy Rice
- Steve Cochran as Hank Rice
- Lloyd Gough as Rummel
- Hugh Sanders as Charlie Barr
- Dale Van Sickel as Walter Adams
- Raymond Greenleaf as Faulkner
- Ned Glass as George Athens
- Paul E. Burns as Frank Hauser
- Walter Baldwin as Coroner Bledsoe
- Lynn Whitney as Cora Athens
- Stuart Randall as Walt Walter
- Sean McClory as Shore
- King Donovan as Ambulance attendant
- John Alban as Reporter (Note: Uncredited role.)
- Lillian Albertson as Mrs. Rainey
- Fred Aldrich as Townsman on Courthouse Steps
- Richard Anderson as Interne
- Gene Evans as Ku Klux Klansman
- Dewey Robinson as Ku Klux Klansman
- Ross Elliott as Glen
- Grandon Rhodes as Pike

== Analysis ==
=== Themes ===
The film contains themes of bigotry, violence against women, and familial dysfunction. Michael Rogin notes that Rogers's and Day's characters in the film are both punished for their familial loyalty as well as their sexuality, citing Rogers's character's self-assured romantic rejection of a salesman in the film's opening scene, contrasted with Day's character, who remains "in thrall to the Klan thug she marries."

=== Hollywood Blacklist interpretations ===
Film scholar Jeff Smith interprets Storm Warning as an allegory for the Hollywood blacklist, citing its production at the height of the Red Scare. Smith also notes the film's oblique references to investigative forces in Washington, D.C. and the northern states, who are subjects of derision from the local klansmen, concluding that the film represents a "paean to HUAC that might easily be read as a defense of the investigations themselves." Smith views Rogers's character as emblematic of witnesses who refused to cooperate with the HUAC investigations, but concludes that the film overall "plays a game of "hide and seek" in appearing to both reveal and conceal the possibility of allegorical readings."

Rogin made similar observations of the film's treatment of the Ku Klux Klan as merely a "racket", adding that it "wants to warn against a violent secret conspiracy without raising the specter of racial injustice," and ultimately interprets Storm Warning as an anti-Communist film.

=== Depiction of the Ku Klux Klan ===
Despite its focus on the Ku Klux Klan, an organization that is historically racist, only a small number of African Americans are depicted in the film, appearing during the expansive crowd sequences. Moira Finnie, writing for Turner Classic Movies, notes that, in addition to omitting references to racism, the film also fails to highlight anti-Catholicism or anti-Semitism in its depiction of the Ku Klux Klan.

== Production ==
=== Development ===
The film's original screenplay was written by Richard Brooks and Daniel Fuchs. Producer Jerry Wald had originally asked Fred Zinnemann to direct the film, but Zinnemann was unable to due to prior obligations. Instead, Wald hired Stuart Heisler as director.

=== Casting ===
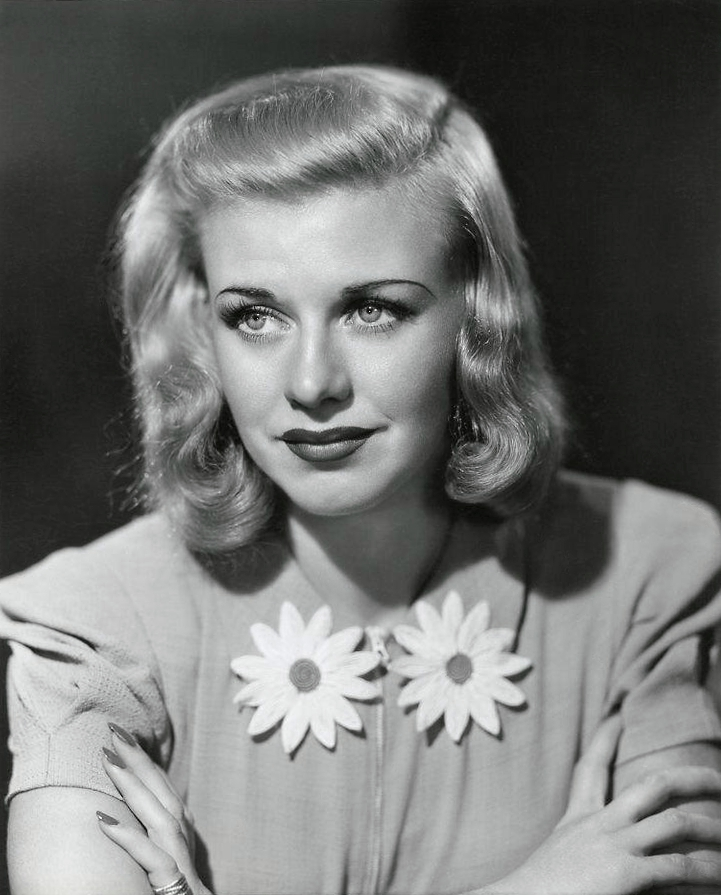
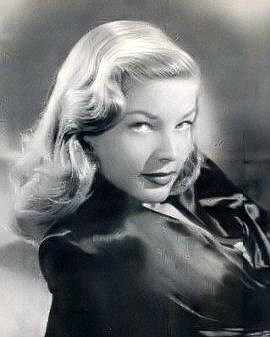
Ginger Rogers (left) was cast in the film after Lauren Bacall (right) violated her contract with Warner Bros. by refusing the role

Warner Bros. originally intended for Lauren Bacall to star in the film, but she declined the role, and was put on suspension by Warner Bros. for her defiance. Bacall's motive for turning down the role was reported at the time to be a financial decision rather than a political one. Commenting to the press, Bacall stated: "I am neither a puppet nor a chattel of Warner Bros. studio to do with as it sees fit." She was subsequently released from her contract with Warner Bros. for her refusal to take the role, and Ginger Rogers was cast in the part. Ronald Reagan, who was cast as District Attorney Burt Rainey, was sent articles by the film's producer, Jerry Wald, about fascism and the assassination of Huey Long in preparation for the role.

Alfred Hitchcock was impressed by Doris Day's dramatic performance in Storm Warning so much that he cast her in his 1956 remake of The Man Who Knew Too Much.

=== Filming ===
Principal photography took place on location in Corona, California, in the fall of 1949. After production was completed in January 1950, Rogers stated that the film's tight shooting schedule had exhausted her. The film had a tentative working title of Storm Center, until it was officially changed to Storm Warning in February 1950.

== Release ==
=== Promotion and box office ===
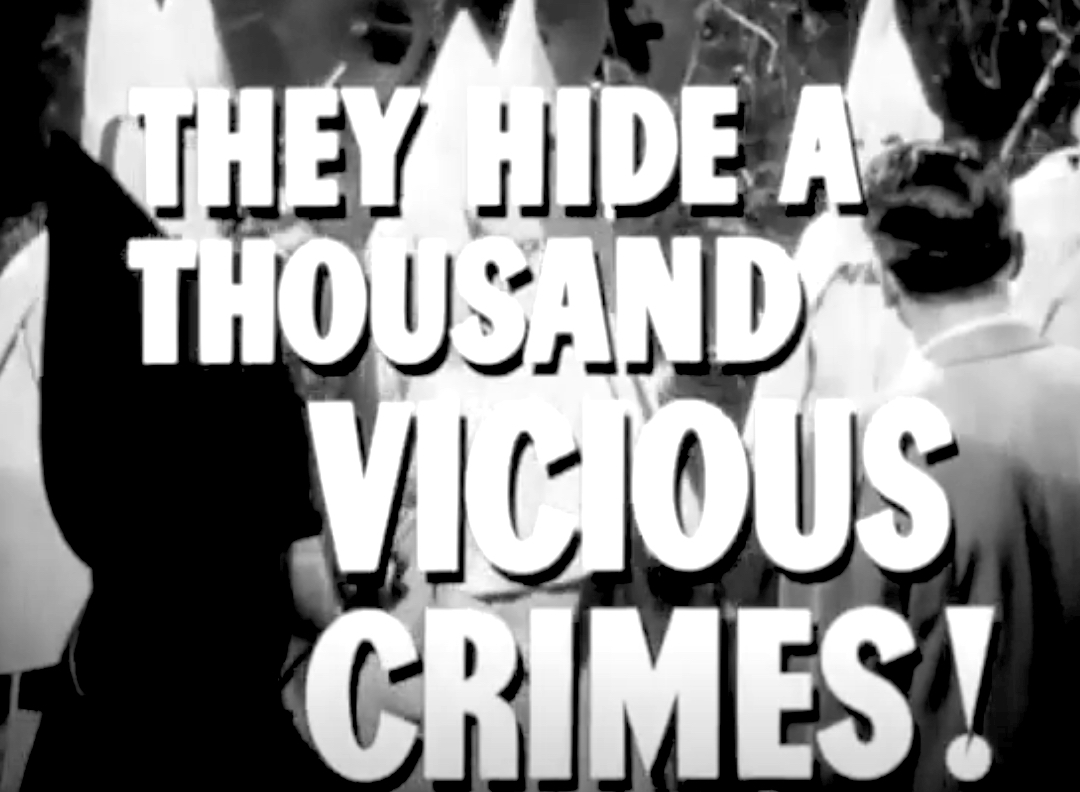
A screenshot from the film's trailer, with a tagline highlighting its focus on the Ku Klux Klan

Storm Warning had its world premiere in Pittsburgh, Pennsylvania on December 20, 1950. The premiere was sponsored by The Pittsburgh Press's Old Newsboys organization, who utilized the event to generate fundraising for disabled children. The following month, it screened in Miami Beach, Florida on January 17, 1951, where Rogers made a public appearance promoting the film, with earnings of ticket sales supporting the Variety Children's Hospital of Greater Miami.

The film's theatrical release expanded wide on February 10, 1951. By the end of the year, it had earned $1.25 million in North American rentals, but was generally regarded as a box-office flop.

=== Critical response ===
==== Contemporary ====
Bosley Crowther of The New York Times, though admiring Warner's "passion for social crusading", was disappointed with the screenplay, observed that "an all-too-familiar conventionality of elements and plot is evident in the screen play which Daniel Fuchs and Richard Brooks have prepared. The forces opposing the prosecutor line up just as you feel they will, his key witness fails him as you figure—at first, that is—and then she falls in line when she sees how horribly and unjustly her silence permits the villains to behave. The consequence is a smoothly flowing, mechanically melodramatic film, superficially forceful but lacking real substance or depth. Edwin Schallert of the Los Angeles Times praised the performances, citing Rogers's dramatic portrayal as a strong point, but summarized: "Compared with some of the powerful exposés sponsored by Warners, this must be classified as a minor effort because it is a case practically of shooting flies with cannon balls at this late date. That doesn't diminish the fact that it is an exciting picture in its way. It simply lacks the vitality that goes with reality plus importance."

==== Modern assessment ====
Critic Dennis Schwartz wrote in 2008 that the film trivialized the topic of bigotry, writing that it treats "the serious subject of race hatred with an inadequate depiction of the KKK, as it pays more attention to the melodrama than to any message. Stuart Heisler (The Glass Key/Dallas/Tulsa) tries to weave a well-intentioned anti-Klan film by working into the plot various forms of violence and intimidation the KKK exerts on a small Southern town ... It has the look and spark of the usual Warner Bros. crime drama, but delivers the public safety message that Americans won't or shouldn't tolerate in their neck of the woods a thuggish organization like the KKK (sort of like their 'crime doesn't pay' messages they leave with their formulaic bloody gangster pics). Surprisingly the racial hate message of the Klan is never touched upon. These Ku Klux Klan members seem to be only interested in keeping outsiders away from their town."

Film scholar Imogen Sara Smith praised the film in 2014 as "beautifully directed by Stuart Heisler", but criticized it for borrowing plot elements from A Streetcar Named Desire as well as for its failure to address the KKK's racist history, instead focusing on the singular murder of a journalist. Critic Michael F. Keaney similarly notes that the film lacks realism due to its excision of racism in the narrative, as well as that its characters do not speak with a Southern accent, but concludes that, "despite these shortcomings, the tightly woven script and solid acting make this an enjoyable film."

In the 2010s, David Sterritt of Turner Classic Movies praised the film's performances as "terrific", citing Rogers's as "best of all... she projects strength and vulnerability with equal skill," adding that both Rogers and Day "outshine Reagan and Cochran." Like Imogen Sara Smith, Sterritt concedes that the film's character of Hank "seems too obviously modeled" on that of Stanley Kowalski in A Streetcar Named Desire.

== Home media ==
Warner Home Entertainment released the film on DVD as part of the Ronald Reagan Signature Collection in August 2006. The Warner Archive Collection released the film on Blu-ray for the first time on April 25, 2023.

It has been shown on the Turner Classic Movies programme Noir Alley with Eddie Muller.

== Sources ==
- Armstrong, Julie, ed. (2015). The Cambridge Companion to American Civil Rights Literature. Cambridge, England: Cambridge University Press. ISBN 978-1-316-24038-0.
- Booker, M. Keith (2021). Historical Dictionary of American Cinema. Lanham, Maryland: Rowman & Littlefield. ISBN 978-1-538-13012-4.
- Gabbard, Krin; Luhr, William, eds. (2008). Screening Genders. Rutgers, New Jersey: Rutgers University Press. ISBN 978-0-813-54340-6.
- Keaney, Michael F. (2015). Film Noir Guide: 745 Films of the Classic Era, 1940-1959. Jefferson, North Carolina: McFarland. ISBN 978-0-786-49155-1.
- Langman, Larry; Ebner, David (2001). Hollywood's Image of the South: A Century of Southern Films. Westport, Connecticut: Greenwood Publishing Group. ISBN 978-0-313-31886-3.
- LeMay, Michael C. (2021). First Amendment Freedoms: A Reference Handbook. Santa Barbara, California: ABC-CLIO. ISBN 978-1-440-86930-3.
- Parish, James Robert (1974). The RKO Gals. New Rochelle, New York: Arlington House. ISBN 978-0-870-00246-5.
- Rogin, Michael (1987). Ronald Reagan The Movie: And Other Episodes in Political Demonology. Berkeley, California: University of California Press. ISBN 978-0-520-06469-0.
- Smith, Imogen Sara (2014a). In Lonely Places: Film Noir Beyond the City. Jefferson, North Carolina: McFarland. ISBN 978-0-786-48908-4.
- Smith, Jeff (2014b). Film Criticism, the Cold War, and the Blacklist: Reading the Hollywood Reds. Berkeley, California: University of California Press. ISBN 978-0-520-95851-7.
