= Love Me or Leave Me (film) =

1955 film by Charles Vidor

- Theatrical release poster
- Directed by: Charles Vidor
- Screenplay by: Daniel Fuchs; Isobel Lennart
- Story by: Daniel Fuchs
- Produced by: Joe Pasternak
- Starring: Doris Day; James Cagney; Cameron Mitchell
- Cinematography: Arthur E. Arling
- Edited by: Ralph E. Winters
- Music by: George Stoll
- Production company: Metro-Goldwyn-Mayer
- Distributed by: Loew's Inc.
- Release date: May 26, 1955
- Running time: 122 minutes
- Country: United States
- Language: English
- Budget: $2.76 million
- Box office: $5.6 million

Love Me or Leave Me is a 1955 American romantic musical drama film starring Doris Day, with James Cagney and Cameron Mitchell in supporting roles. Also a biopic, the MGM production recounts the life of Ruth Etting, a singer who rose from dancer to movie star. Nominated for six Academy Awards, the picture was directed by Charles Vidor and written by Daniel Fuchs and Isobel Lennart, from a story by Daniel Fuchs.

== Plot ==
Nineteen-twenties Chicago nightclub singer and dime-a-dance girl Ruth Etting is in jeopardy of losing her job for kicking a customer for his unwelcome attention. Martin Snyder, known as "The Gimp" because of his game leg, intervenes on her behalf. A man of considerable clout, he owns a laundry business as a front and runs a thriving protection racket.

Etting is desperate to get into show business. Snyder gets her a job dancing in a floor show, then pays for a singing coach, Johnny Alderman, who is also attracted to her.

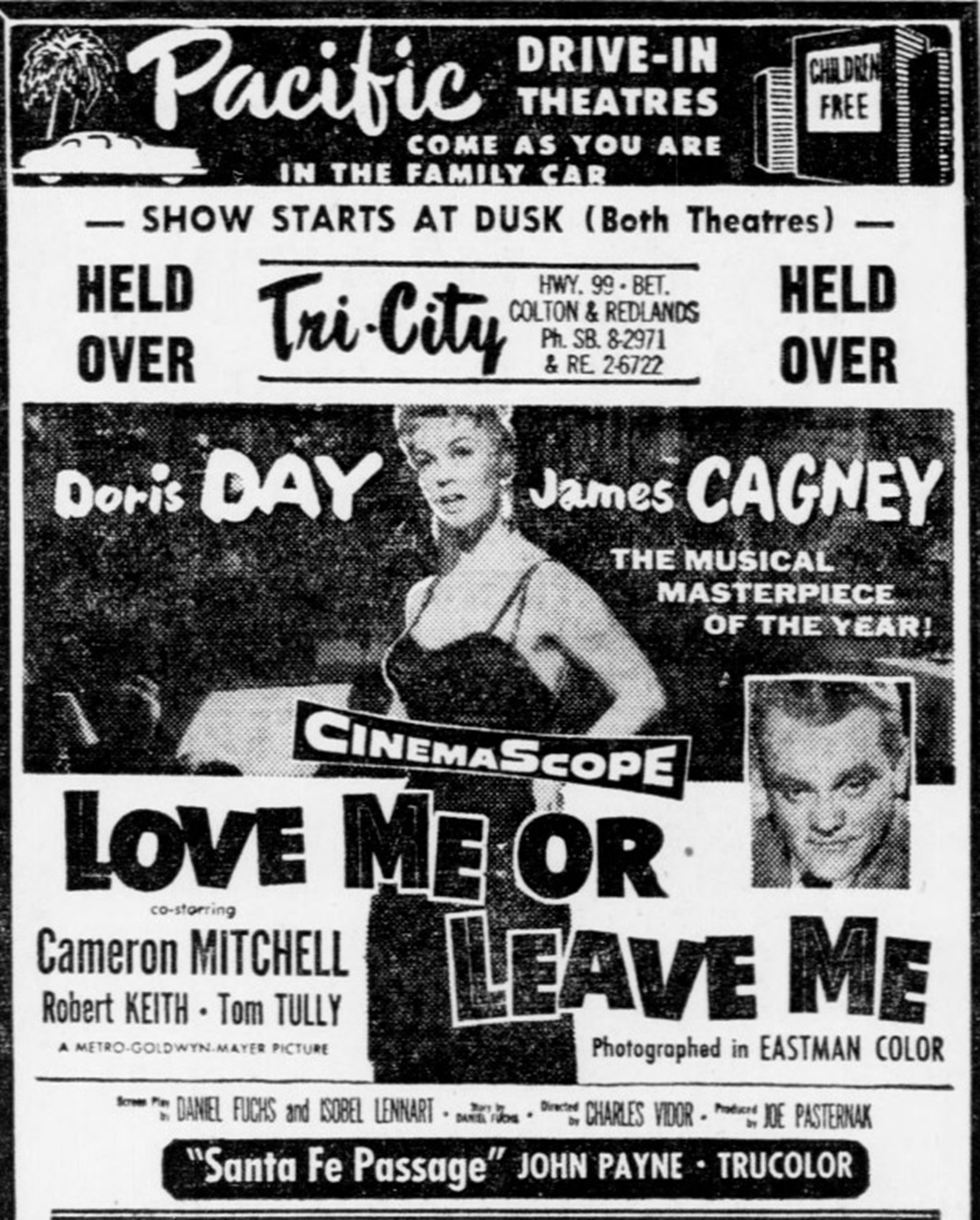
Drive-in advertisement from 1955.

Etting and Alderman are grateful, but Snyder makes it clear he expects Etting to travel to Miami with him, not for business but for pleasure. Etting declines, but Snyder's interest in her continues. Through an agent, Bernie Loomis, he arranges a radio program to feature Etting, followed by a job with the Ziegfeld Follies. His crude behavior and violent temper cause Etting multiple problems.

Johnny continues to woo Etting, but under heavy pressure from Snyder she marries him instead. His heavy-handed management continues as her career blossoms. Goaded to enter the entertainment business, Snyder decides to open a nightclub of his own, sinking his wealth heavily into it. Upset at sensing a relationship resuming between Etting and Johnny during their filming of a Hollywood movie, Snyder strikes her; she runs off and seeks a divorce. Snyder then catches them together, shoots Johnny and is arrested.

Horrified but conflicted because of all Snyder has done for her career, Etting arranges for Loomis to bail him out of jail. At his nightclub which he expects to find deserted, Snyder arrives to find Etting performing there herself. At first enraged by what he perceives as an act of charity, Snyder finally realizes this is Etting's way of showing her appreciation, even if she can't be part of his life any longer.

== Cast ==
- Doris Day as Ruth Etting
- James Cagney as Martin Snyder
- Cameron Mitchell as Johnny Alderman
- Robert Keith as Bernard V. Loomis
- Tom Tully as Frobisher
- Harry Bellaver as Georgie
- Richard Gaines as Paul Hunter
- Peter Leeds as Fred Taylor
- Claude Stroud as Eddie Fulton
- Audrey Young as Jingle Girl
- John Harding as Greg Trent

== Production ==
The role of Snyder was originally intended for Spencer Tracy, but he turned it down. After the Etting role was turned down by Ava Gardner, Cagney suggested Doris Day to producer Joe Pasternak. Gardner was subsequently placed on a temporary salary suspension by MGM as a punishment.

== Reception ==
Variety called the film "a rich canvas of the Roaring '20s, with gutsy and excellent performances."

== Awards and nominations ==
Award	Category	Nominee(s)	Result	Ref.
Academy Awards	Best Actor	James Cagney	Nominated	
Academy Awards	Best Screenplay	Daniel Fuchs and Isobel Lennart	Nominated	
Academy Awards	Best Motion Picture Story	Daniel Fuchs	Won	
Academy Awards	Best Scoring of a Musical Picture	Percy Faith and Georgie Stoll	Nominated	
Academy Awards	Best Song	"I'll Never Stop Loving You"; Music by Nicholas Brodszky; Lyrics by Sammy Cahn	Nominated	
Academy Awards	Best Sound Recording	Wesley C. Miller	Nominated	
Directors Guild of America Awards	Outstanding Directorial Achievement in Motion Pictures	Charles Vidor	Nominated	
Writers Guild of America Awards	Best Written American Musical	Daniel Fuchs and Isobel Lennart	Won	

== Box-office ==
According to MGM records the film earned $4,035,000 in the US and Canada and $1,597,000 elsewhere, resulting in a profit of $595,000. Love Me or Leave Me was the eighth ranked movie in 1955.

== Soundtrack ==
All but two of the songs in the movie were hits that Etting had recorded originally back in the 1920s and early 1930s. These new songs, written specifically for the film, are "Never Look Back" by Chilton Price and "I'll Never Stop Loving You" by Nicholas Brodzsky and Sammy Cahn.

The songs as they appear in the film (all sung by Doris Day except as shown):

- "Ten Cents a Dance"
- "I'm Sitting on Top of the World" (sung by Claude Stroud)
- "It All Depends On You"
- "You Made Me Love You"
- "Stay on the Right Side Sister"
- "Everybody Loves My Baby (But My Baby Loves Nobody But Me)"
- "Mean To Me"
- "Sam, the Old Accordion Man"
- "Shaking the Blues Away" (sung by Doris Day, danced by Doris Day and Chorus)
- "I'll Never Stop Loving You"
- "Never Look Back"
- "Five Foot Two, Eyes of Blue"
- "At Sundown"
- "My Blue Heaven"
- "Love Me or Leave Me"

== See also ==
- List of American films of 1955
