= Otto K. Eitel =

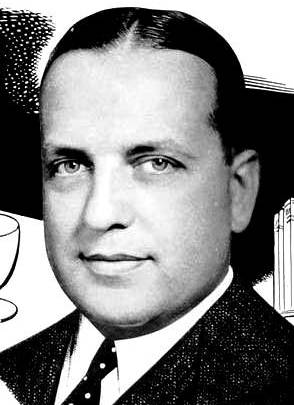
Otto K. Eitel

Otto Karl Eitel (May 19, 1901 – 1983) was a hotel executive in Chicago.

== Origin ==
Otto K. Eitel was the second child of Karl Eitel (1871–1954) and his first wife Marie Louise Eitel née Boldenweck (1875–1913). His father emigrated at age 20 from Stuttgart in Germany to Chicago, founded there with his brother Emil Eitel the Bismarck Hotel Co., to which belonged the Bismarck Hotel and the large beer garden Marigold Gardens.

Otto's mother was the daughter of the building contractor Louis Henry Boldenweck (1835–1896), who was born in Heilbronn and emigrated with his parents and six siblings to Chicago in 1854, and of her Chicago-born mother Luise Henriette Kober (1843–1923), who was also of German origin.

== Life ==
After education and vocational training in the U.S. and in Germany Otto K. Eitel volunteered in the Hotel Astor on Times Square in New York, which was founded in the same year by the German emigrants William C. Muschenheim (1855–1918) and Frederick A. Muschenheim, and where his uncle Max Eitel had also volunteered in 1904–1906.

In 1926, he became director of the Bismarck hotel, which belonged to his father Karl and his uncle Emil. In 1933, he took over the management of Stevens Hotel, founded in 1927, which was situated right on Lake Michigan and then the largest hotel in the world. This position, he held at least until 1939, also after the insolvency of the Stevens family in the Great Depression in 1935. In 1949, he assumed the office of President of the Bismarck Hotel Co., which he held until the sale of the hotel in 1956 to the hotel and sports entrepreneur Arthur Wirtz.

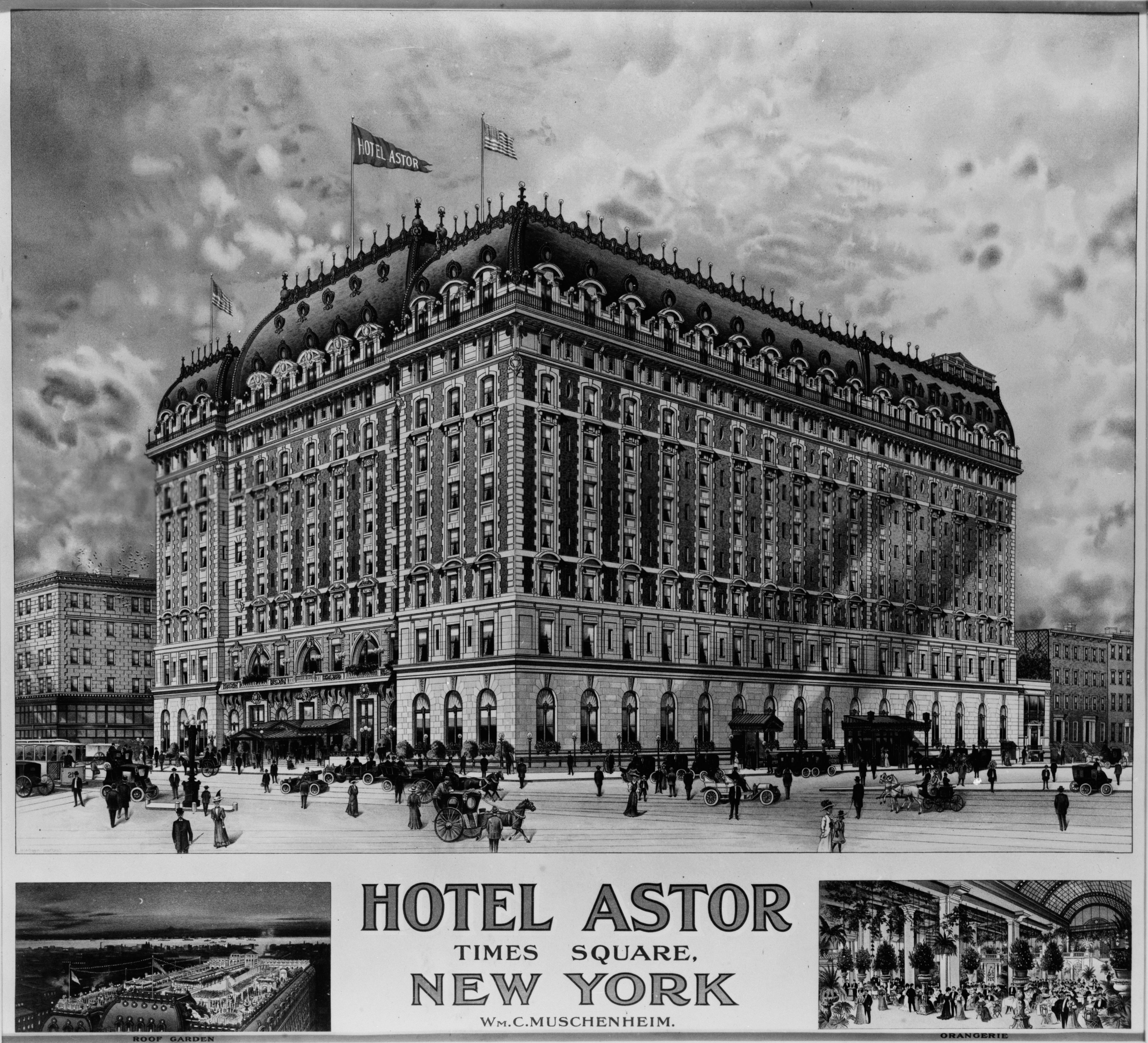
Hotel Astor, New York, postcard about 1900–1910.

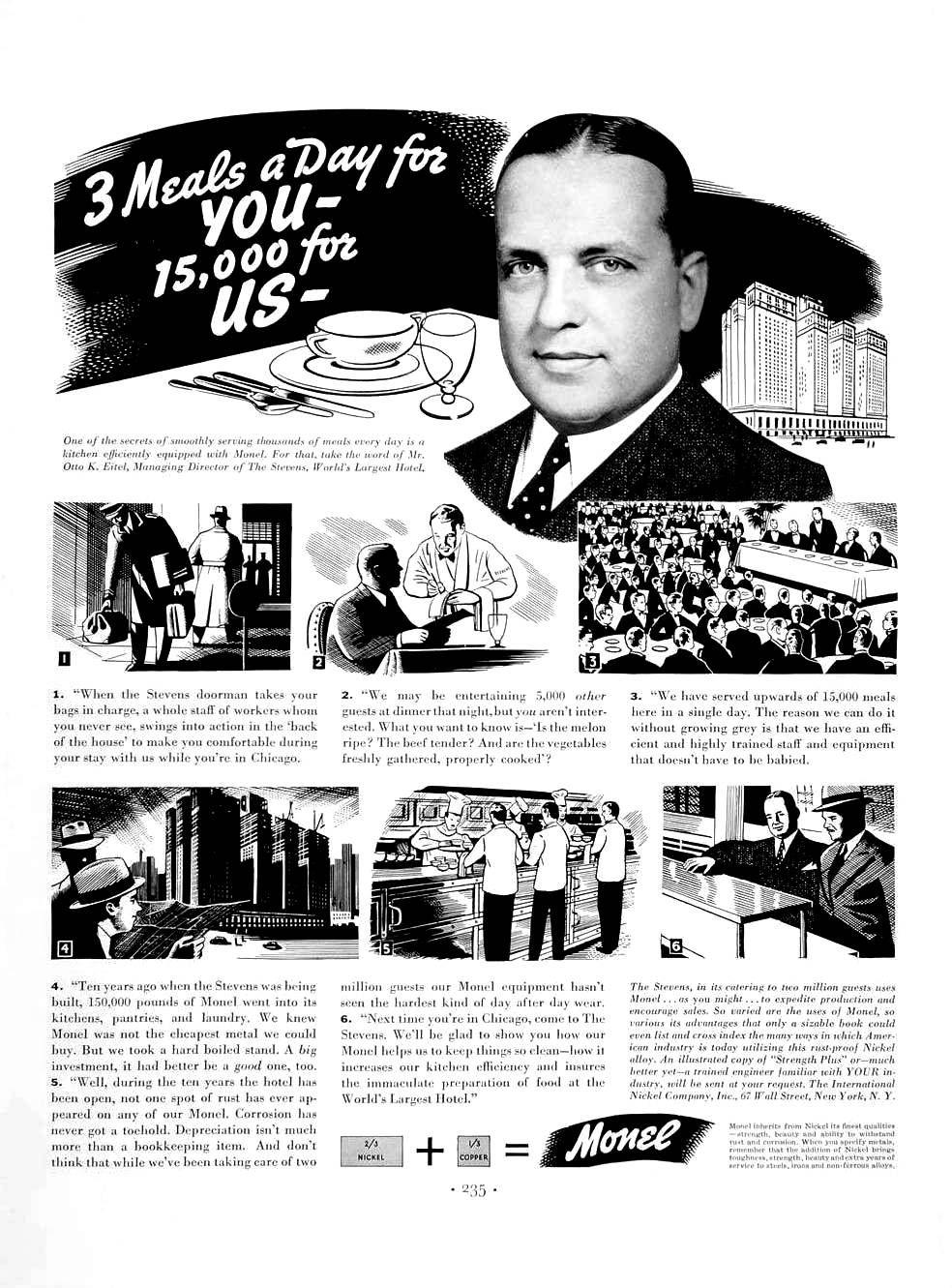
Advertisement for Monel with a portrait of Otto. K. Eitel, 1937.

== Honors ==
As a member of the Schwabenverein "he has distinguished himself in the years after the Second World War in particular, being an avid supporter of charitable gifts donations to the old country". For this, the German President Theodor Heuss conferred upon him in 1953 the Grand Merit Cross of the Order of Merit of the Federal Republic of Germany.

During his trip to America, the German Chancellor Konrad Adenauer came on April 14, 1953, to Chicago and stayed twice in the Bismarck Hotel. On this occasion, he met the president of the Bismarck Hotel Otto K. Eitel and handed him the Great Merit Cross. On April 14, 1953, Adenauer held in the Bismarck Hotel a press conference. Afterwards, Otto K. Eitel accompanied Adenauer on his walk to the City Hall. In the evening, Adenauer met again Otto K. Eitel in Eitel's Palace Theatre in a benefit concert "for the benefit of refugees from East Berlin".

== Publications ==
Together with his wife, Otto K. Eitel published in 1944 for the first time their music calendar From Bach to Gershwin, "a beautiful edition showing graphically the arc of years, which spans the lives of the greatest composers in the world since the 18th century".

- Otto K Eitel: From Bach to Gershwin. Two and one half centuries of music up to 1944, Chicago [1944].
- Otto K Eitel; Joseph Feher; Raymond F DaBoll; E Willis Jones: From Bach to Gershwin. Two and one half centuries of music, Chicago: Bismarck Hotel 1951.

== Bibliography ==
- Adenauer in den USA: Chicago, Deutsche Wochenschau, documentary film 1953 .
- Journey to America. Collected speeches, statements, press, radio and tv interviews by Konrad Adenauer, during his visit to the United States and Canada, April 6–18, 1953, Washington, DC 1953, pages 94–112, page 106: photo of Otto K. Eitel talking with Konrad Adenauer.
- Fred J Ahsley: The house of Eitel. Aristocrats in hospitality, Chicago [1947?].
- Sechs Stuttgarter schrieben wichtiges Kapitel amerikanischer Hotelgeschichte. In: Amtsblatt der Stadt Stuttgart No. 45, November 12, 1953, page 13.
- Ehrung eines Schwaben in Chicago. In: Amtsblatt der Stadt Stuttgart July 2, 1953.
- Max Martin Brehm: Mit dem Bundeskanzler in USA, Höchstadt (Aisch) 1953, pages 86–90, unnumbered pages with illustrations.
- Grave database „Find a Grave“.
- The national cyclopedia of American biography [NCAB], volume 41, Clifton, NJ 1967, page 511.
- New Yorker Staatszeitung und Herold November 12, 1953.
