= Ruth Etting =

American singer and actress (1896–1978)

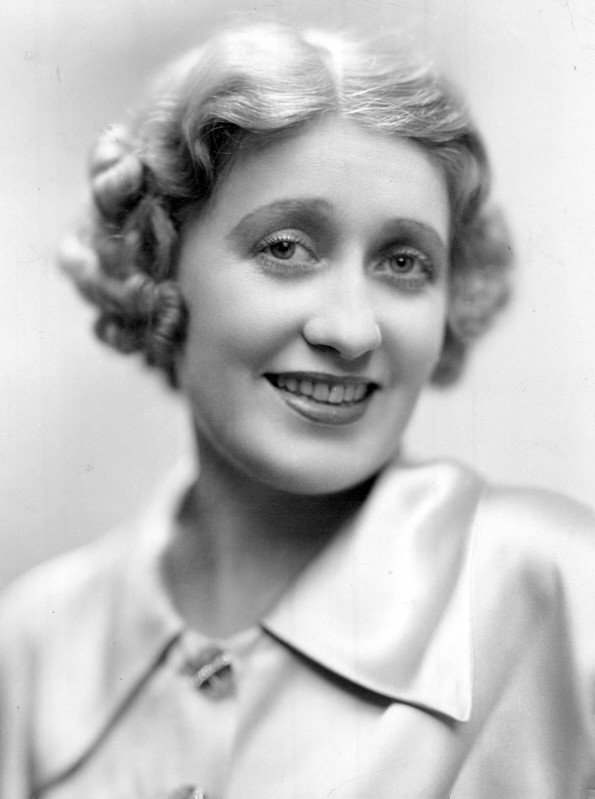
- Etting in 1935
- Born: November 23, 1896; David City, Nebraska, U.S.
- Died: September 24, 1978 (aged 81); Colorado Springs, Colorado, U.S.
- Resting place: Shrine of Remembrance Mausoleum
- Occupations: Actress; singer
- Years active: 1912–1938
- Spouses: Moe Snyder (m. 1922; div. 1937) Harry Myrl Alderman (m. 1938; died 1966)

Ruth Etting (November 23, 1896 – September 24, 1978) was an American singer and actress during the 1920s and 1930s, who had over 60 hit recordings and worked in stage, radio, and film. Known as "America's sweetheart of song", her signature tunes were "Shine On, Harvest Moon", "Ten Cents a Dance" and "Love Me or Leave Me".

As a young girl in Nebraska, Etting had wanted to become an artist; she drew and sketched all the time. At sixteen, her grandparents decided to send her to art school in Chicago. While Etting attended class, she found a job at the Marigold Gardens nightclub. After a short time there, Etting gave up art classes in favor of a career in show business. Etting, who enjoyed singing in school and church, never took any formal singing lessons. She quickly became a featured vocalist at the club. Etting was then managed by Moe Snyder, whom she married in 1922. Snyder was known for being very protective of Ruth, keeping her out of trouble in the dangerous city and referring to her as "the little lady", along with other affectionate names. He made arrangements for Etting's recording and film contracts as well as her personal and radio appearances. She became nationally known when she appeared in Flo Ziegfeld's Follies of 1927.

Etting intended to retire from performing in 1935, but that did not happen until after a messy divorce from Snyder in 1937. Harry Myrl Alderman, Etting's pianist, was separated from his wife when he and Etting began a relationship. Snyder began making telephone threats to Etting in January 1938. In October, Snyder traveled to Los Angeles and detained Alderman as he was leaving a local radio station. At gunpoint, he forced the pianist to take him to Etting's home, saying he intended to kill Etting, Alderman, and his own daughter, Edith Snyder, who worked for Etting. Snyder shot Alderman, who survived. Three days later, Alderman's wife filed suit against Etting for alienation of affection.

While Alderman and Etting claimed to have been married in Mexico in July 1938, Alderman's divorce would not be finalized until December of that year. The couple married during Moe Snyder's trial for attempted murder in December 1938. Etting and Alderman relocated to a farm outside of Colorado Springs, Colorado, where they kept out of the spotlight except for occasional public appearances and interviews. Her fictionalized story was told in the musical film Love Me Or Leave Me (1955) with Doris Day as Ruth Etting and James Cagney as Moe Snyder.

== Biography ==
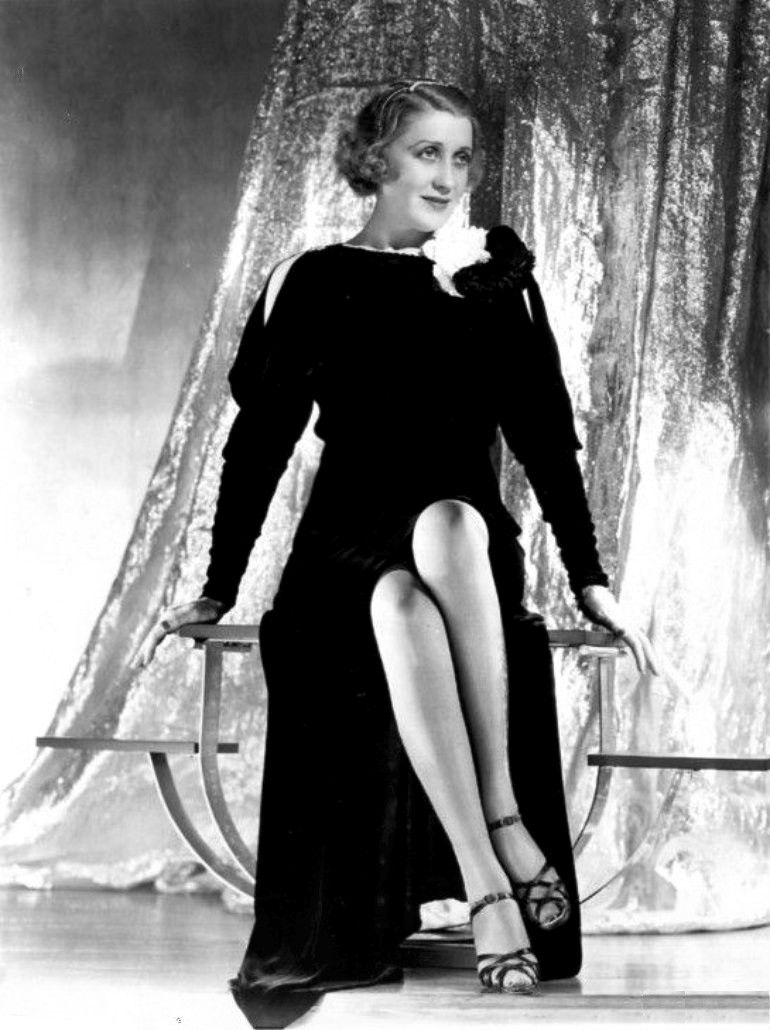
Etting in a photo for her CBS radio program sponsored by Oldsmobile.

Ruth Etting was born on November 23, 1896, in David City, Nebraska, to Alfred Etting, a banker, and Winifred Etting (née Kleinhan). Her mother died when she was five years old, while she and Ruth were travelling west. She then lived with her paternal grandparents, George and Hannah Etting. Her father remarried and moved away from David City and was no longer a part of his daughter's life. Etting's grandfather, George, owned the Etting Roller Mills. To the delight of his granddaughter, George Etting allowed traveling circuses and shows to use the lot behind the mills for performances.

Etting was interested in drawing at an early age; she drew and sketched anywhere she was able. Her grandparents were asked to buy the textbooks she had used at the end of a school term because Etting had filled them with her drawings. She left David City at the age of sixteen to attend art school in Chicago. Etting gained a job designing costumes at the Marigold Gardens nightclub, which led to employment singing and dancing in the chorus. She gave up art school soon after beginning to work at Marigold Gardens. Before turning exclusively to performing, Etting worked as a designer for the owner of a costume shop in Chicago's Loop, and was successful enough to earn a partnership in the shop through her work.

While she enjoyed singing at school and in church, Etting never took formal voice lessons. She said that she had patterned her song styling after Marion Harris, but created her own unique style by alternating tempos and by varying some notes and phrases. Describing herself as a "high, squeaky soprano" during her days in David City, Etting developed a lower range singing voice after her arrival in Chicago which led to her success. Her big moment came when a featured vocalist suddenly became ill and was unable to perform. With no other replacement available, Etting was asked to fill in. She quickly changed into the costume and scanned the music arrangements; the performer was male, so Etting tried to adjust by singing in a lower register. The club enjoyed her performance exceedingly, and Ruth became a featured vocalist at the nightclub.

Etting was hired as one of the lead singers for a new show to be presented at Fred Mann’s Million Dollar Rainbo Room in Chicago's Rainbo Gardens. One of her co-stars was Chicago ballerina Betty “Buddye” Felsen. The show, Rainbo Trail, was directed by Frank Westphal. It opened on December 15, 1922 and ran until March 1, 1923.

Etting met gangster Martin "Moe the Gimp" Snyder in 1922, when she was performing at the Marigold Gardens in Chicago. Etting described herself as a young, naive girl when she arrived; and due to her inexperience in the ways of the big city, she became reliant on Snyder after their meeting. Snyder, who divorced his first wife to marry Etting, was well acquainted with Chicago's nightclubs and the entertainers who worked in them; he once served as a bodyguard to Al Jolson. Snyder also used his political connections to gain bookings for Etting, who was called "Miss City Hall" because of Snyder's influence in Chicago. Etting married Snyder on July 17, 1922, in Crown Point, Indiana. She later said she married him "nine-tenths out of fear and one-tenth out of pity." Etting later told her friends, "If I leave him, he'll kill me." He managed her career, booking radio appearances and eventually had her signed to an exclusive recording contract with Columbia Records.

=== Stage, screen and radio ===
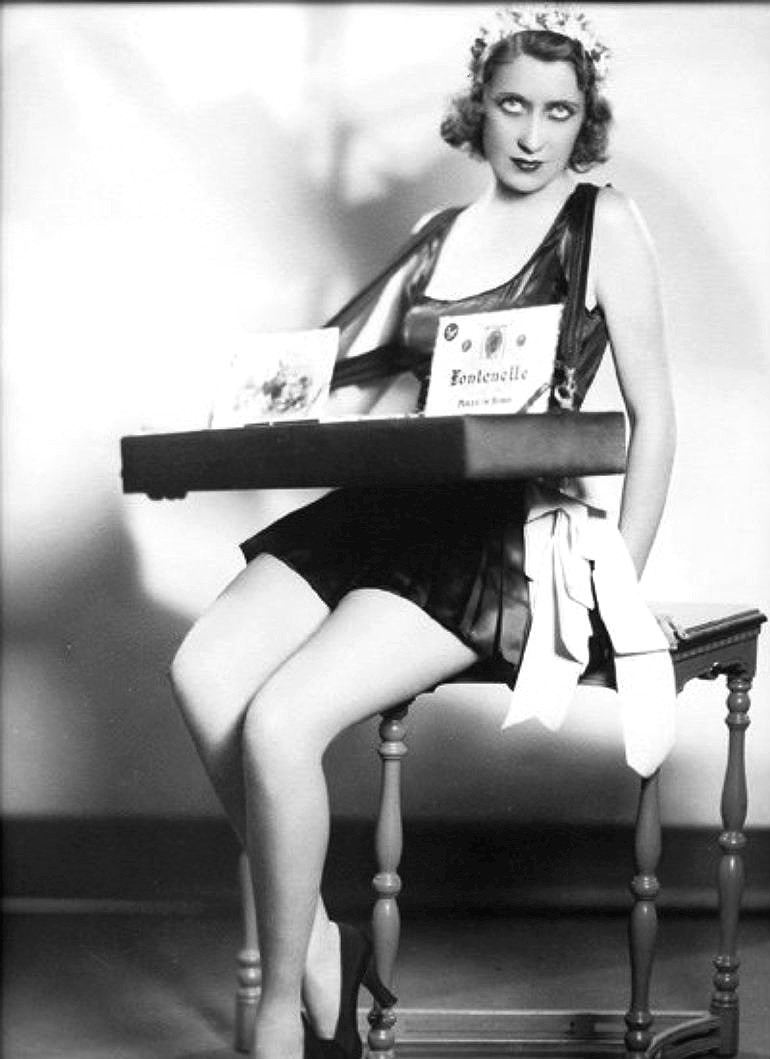
Etting in the Ziegfeld Follies of 1931

The couple moved to New York in 1927, where Etting made her Broadway debut in the Ziegfeld Follies of 1927. Irving Berlin had recommended her to showman Florenz Ziegfeld. Etting nervously prepared to sing for Ziegfeld at the audition. However, he did not ask her to sing at all; only to walk up and down the room. She was hired on that basis because Ziegfeld did not hire women with big ankles. While the original plan for the show was for Etting to do a tap dance after singing "Shaking the Blues Away", she later remembered she was not a very good dancer. At the show's final rehearsal, Flo Ziegfeld told her: "Ruth, when you get through singing, just walk off the stage". Etting also appeared in Ziegfeld's last "Follies" in 1931.

She went on to appear in other hit shows in rapid succession, including Ziegfeld's Simple Simon and Whoopee!. Etting was not originally signed to perform in Simple Simon; she became part of the cast at the last minute when vocalist Lee Morse was too intoxicated to perform. Ziegfeld asked Etting to replace Morse; she hurried to Boston, where the show was being tried out prior to Broadway. When Etting arrived, songwriters Rodgers and Hart discovered that the song "Ten Cents a Dance" was not written for Etting's voice range. The three spent the night rewriting the song so Etting could perform it.

Toward the end of Simple Simon's Broadway run, Etting persuaded Ziegfeld to add "Love Me Or Leave Me" to the show though the song was originally written for Whoopee!. She had recorded the song in 1928, but Etting's new version of it was impressive enough to earn her a Vitaphone contract to make film shorts.

In Hollywood, Etting made a long series of movie shorts between 1929 and 1936, and three feature movies in 1933 and 1934. She described the short films as either having a simple plot to allow for her to sing two songs or with no plot at all. The idea was to have Etting sing at least two songs in the film. While she received a marquee billing for Roman Scandals, Etting had only two lines in the film and sang just one song. Etting believed she might have had more success in full-length films if she had been given some acting lessons. Her perception was that the studios viewed her only as a vocalist. She later recalled: "I was no actress, and I knew it. But I could sell a song". In 1936, she appeared in London in Ray Henderson's Transatlantic Rhythm. Etting quit the show because she and the other performers had not been paid.

Etting was first heard on radio station WLS while she was living in Chicago. Her appearance drew so much fan mail the station signed her to a year's contract for twice weekly performances. On CBS, she broadcast twice weekly in a 15 minute radio show in the 1930s. By 1934, she was on NBC with sports announcer Ted Husing and sponsorship of the program from Oldsmobile .

== Personal life ==
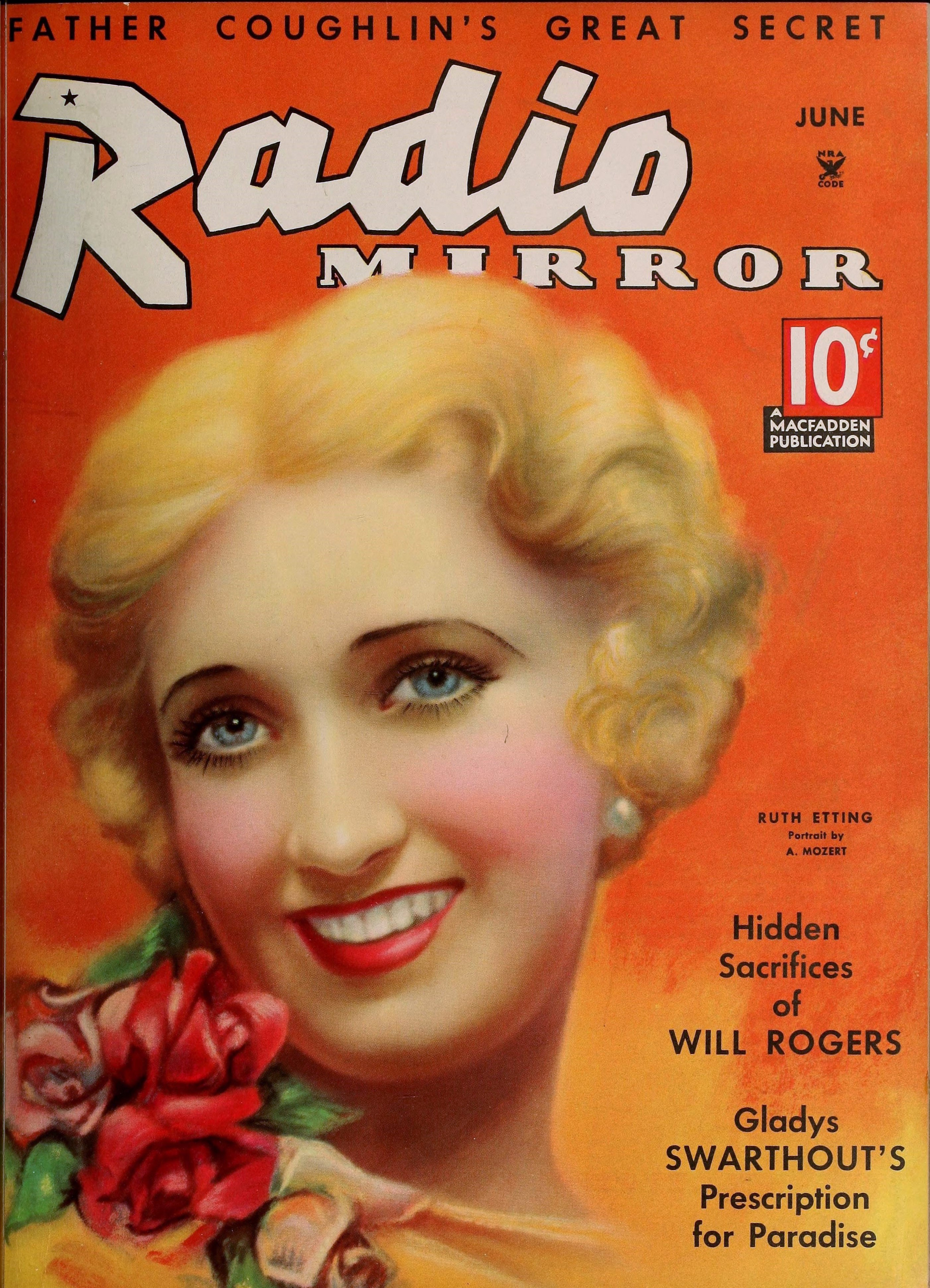
Etting on the cover of the June 1935 edition of Radio Mirror.

Etting saved some of her paycheck each week, regardless of the amount she was making at the time. Her friends said she invested in California real estate rather than the stock market. Etting, who made many of her own clothes, did her own housekeeping and lived frugally, initially announced her retirement in 1935. It is not clear why she did not go through with her announced plans, but she issued a second statement regarding retirement after filing for divorce from Snyder in November 1937.

Snyder's aggressive and controlling management style began to cause problems for Etting; during her work with Whoopee! on Broadway, Snyder was a constant presence. He was never without a gun and enjoyed poking people with it while saying "Put your hands up!" and then laughing when their fright was evident. Snyder also persisted in cornering Ziegfeld because he believed Etting's role in the musical could be improved. Ziegfeld had a different opinion and indicated nothing would be changed. Snyder would then mumble that it was not a suggestion but a demand.

By 1934, she was having difficulty getting engagements. Snyder's arguing and fighting at venues where Etting was employed caused her to be passed by for jobs in the United States. (Note: Snyder's aggressive behavior was well known among those who had worked with Etting. It was said that most people working on Broadway were afraid of him.) In 1936, she thought taking work in England might be the answer, but Snyder created problems while she was working there also. Soon after the couple arrived in England, Snyder became involved in a street fight, which created adverse publicity for Etting. She divorced Moe Snyder on the grounds of cruelty and abandonment on November 30, 1937. (Note: Etting and Snyder left Chicago for New York when Etting worked on Broadway and in film shorts. The couple relocated to California after Etting began working in full-length films. Etting remained in California for her radio work while Snyder returned to Chicago. Snyder's way of "managing" Etting's career via physical force, threats and possessiveness had become problematic. He had become so unpleasant to deal with that he was barred from venues where he had previously booked engagements for Etting. Looking back, Etting said that she had been married to Snyder for 18 years and that "I must have been crazy!") Snyder did not contest the divorce and received a settlement from his former wife. Etting gave her ex-husband half of her earnings at the time, $50,000, some securities and a half interest in a home in Beverly Hills, California. She deducted the gambling debts of Snyder she had paid and the costs she had paid for a home for Snyder's mother.

=== Threats and the shooting ===
Etting fell in love with her pianist, Myrl Alderman, who was separated from his wife. In January 1938, she began receiving threatening telephone calls from Snyder, who initially claimed Etting withheld assets from him when the divorce settlement was made. (Note: Snyder continued to claim this even after shooting Myrl Alderman.) Though the couple was divorced, Snyder was also upset because of reports that she was seeing another man. Snyder told Etting that he would come to California and kill her. When Snyder telephoned and found Etting unavailable, he told his daughter Edith that he "would fix her ticket, too". He called again that evening; this time Etting took the call with her cousin, Arthur Etting, listening on an extension. Etting requested police protection after the telephone call and arranged for private protection. Apparently believing the danger was over when Snyder did not appear soon after his telephone call, Etting released her bodyguards a few days later.

On October 15, 1938, Snyder detained Myrl Alderman at a local radio station and forced the pianist to take him to his former wife at gunpoint. In the house at the time were Etting and Edith Snyder. Edith, Snyder's daughter by a previous marriage, worked for Etting and remained living with her after the divorce. Snyder held Etting and Alderman at gunpoint; when told his daughter was in another part of the house, he made Etting call her into the room. Snyder said he intended to kill all three, and told them to be quiet. When Myrl Alderman attempted to speak, Snyder shot him. Snyder then told his ex-wife, "I've had my revenge, so you can call the police."

Snyder claimed Myrl Alderman pulled a gun and shot at him first and that his ex-wife would not file charges against him because she still loved him. He also claimed he was drunk when he made the telephone threats to Etting in January 1938, saying that at the time his intentions were to kill both his ex-wife and himself. Ruth Etting said that the only gun in the home belonged to her, and after the shooting of Alderman, she was able to go into her bedroom and get it. Upon seeing Etting's gun, Moe Snyder wrested it away from her; it landed on the floor. (Note: A few days after the shooting, Walter Winchell printed in his column that Snyder was very fortunate to have gotten the gun away from Etting, because she was a crack shot.) Snyder's daughter, Edith, picked it up and held it on her father, shooting at him but hitting the floor instead. During a police reenactment of the shooting three days later, Edith Snyder said that she fired at her father to save Ruth Etting, weeping as she continued, "I don't yet know whether I am sorry I missed my Dad or whether I am glad". Snyder was accused of attempting to murder his ex-wife, his daughter, and Etting's accompanist, Myrl Alderman, the kidnapping of Alderman, as well as California state gun law violations.

=== Alienation of affections suit ===
Three days after the shooting of Myrl Alderman, the pianist's second wife, Alma, sued Etting for alienation of her husband's affections. Though Etting and Alderman claimed to have been married in Tijuana, Mexico, in July 1938, Alma Alderman said any marriage was invalid, because her divorce from Myrl Alderman would not be final until December 1938. Police investigators could find no record of the couple's Mexican marriage. (Note: News stories show that Etting and Alderman were referred to as married in Mexico in July 1938.) Etting publicly invited Alma Alderman to visit her husband in the hospital, in an effort to see if the couple could reconcile.

Ruth Etting testified that she was not married to Alderman. During the course of the trial, there was also a question of the validity of Alderman's marriage to Alma. Alderman's first wife, Helen, obtained an interlocutory decree on January 7, 1935; the divorce became final one year later. On January 9, 1935, Alderman married Alma in Mexico. The second Mrs. Alderman called Moe Snyder to the stand as a witness regarding an attraction between her husband and Etting. Helen Alderman Warne also appeared in court, claiming that Alma Alderman had spirited Myrl away from her. Warne added that she had married and divorced the pianist twice. Alma Alderman's lawsuit ended in December 1939, with the court finding that she was not entitled to damages from Ruth Etting.

=== Trial and aftermath ===
The testimony in both trials brought much personal information into the public eye. Snyder, who claimed to still be in love with his ex-wife, gave Etting a diamond and platinum bracelet which she accepted after Snyder's telephone threat in January 1938. Etting testified that she agreed with her ex-husband's statement to police that Snyder was either drunk or out of his mind when he threatened her by phone. Snyder's attorney initially tried to prevent Etting from testifying against Snyder with a charge that the divorce she obtained in Illinois was invalid because she was a resident of California at that time.

During the trial, Snyder's attorney portrayed Ruth Etting as a calculating woman who had married Moe Snyder strictly for the benefit of her career, and that she divorced him in favor of being with another, younger man (Alderman). Snyder's attorney echoed his client's claim of self-defense and said his client never intended to kill Etting, his daughter, and Myrl Alderman. The attorney further claimed that, had Snyder intended to kill Alderman, he would have had ample time to do so while holding a gun on the pianist during the drive from the radio station to Etting‘s home where the shooting took place.

Etting married Alderman, who was almost a decade her junior, on December 14, 1938, in Las Vegas, during Moe Snyder's trial for attempted murder. (Note: Edith Snyder, Moe's daughter, remained with Ruth Etting. Edith, age 22, died of heart disease on August 3, 1939. She had heart problems due to rheumatic fever at age 16.) Snyder was convicted of attempted murder, but released on appeal after one year in jail. Snyder won a new trial but returned to jail in January 1940 in lieu of bail. In August 1940, Myrl Alderman asked the district attorney to drop further prosecution attempts against Snyder for the 1938 shooting.

Etting, who had retired from performing prior to the shooting and subsequent trials, briefly had a radio show on WHN in 1947. She also accepted an engagement at New York's Copacabana in March 1947. Etting traveled alone to New York and during a newspaper interview, was asked if she had ever seen Moe Snyder again. She replied, "No, I hope I never do." and said that her husband never went to bed without a gun.

== Later life and death ==
Etting and Alderman moved to an eight-acre farm outside of Colorado Springs in 1938. From 1947 until 1949, Etting and Alderman operated a restaurant. Alderman died in Denver on November 28, 1966, and was temporarily buried in Evergreen Cemetery, Colorado Springs. Etting died in Colorado Springs in 1978, at age 81. She was survived by a stepson, John Alderman, and four grandchildren. Etting and Alderman are interred at the Shrine of Remembrance Mausoleum in Colorado Springs, Colorado.

== Legacy ==
Etting's life was the basis for the fictionalized film, Love Me or Leave Me (1955), which starred Doris Day (as Etting), James Cagney (as Snyder) and Cameron Mitchell (as Alderman). Etting, Myrl Alderman and Moe Snyder all sold their rights to the story to MGM; Snyder was living in Chicago in 1955. (Note: Though there would not be a film for almost twenty years after the shooting, Hy Gardner, a New York columnist, suggested a film of Etting's life with the title Love Me Or Leave Me.) (Note: Etting, Alderman and Snyder retained the right to approve or disapprove of the film's script. In August 1954, both Etting and Snyder objected to s script which would have portrayed them as living together when they were actually married. They were told by MGM that the Motion Picture Production Code would not allow portrayal of the marriage breakup and Etting's eventual marriage to Alderman, though it might be possible to do so because the marriage did not end because of another relationship. Snyder and Etting were angry enough to consider suing MGM if the film depicted them as not being married. In 1957, Etting filed a million-dollar libel suit against Cosmopolitan magazine for a story which described Day's character in the film as "a famous girl singer of the twenties who fell in love with a bad man, became an alcoholic, and inspired a murder.") Etting expressed sadness that "the real highlight of my life", her marriage to Alderman, was omitted from the film. Shortly before her death, Etting said she thought the screen portrayal of her was too tough and that Jane Powell would have been a better choice for the lead.

Etting has a star on the Hollywood Walk of Fame for her work in films, located on the north side of the 6500 block of Hollywood Boulevard. Her recordings of Love Me Or Leave Me (2005) and Ten Cents a Dance (1999) are part of the Grammy Hall of Fame.

== Recording history ==
After an unissued test made by Victor on April 4, 1924, Etting was signed to Columbia Records in February 1926. She remained at Columbia through June 1931, when she split her recording between ARC (Banner, Perfect, Romeo, Oriole, etc.) and Columbia through March 1933. She signed with Brunswick and remained there until May 1934, when she re-signed with Columbia through July 1935. After a solitary Brunswick session in March 1936, she signed with the British label Rex and recorded two sessions in August and September, 1936. Etting returned to the US and signed with Decca in December 1936 and recorded until April 1937, when she basically retired from recording.

== Hit records ==
Year	Single	US Chart (Note: Joel Whitburn's methodology for creating pre-1940s chart placings has been criticised, and they should not be taken as definitive.)
1926	"Let's Talk about My Sweetie"	14
1926	"Lonesome and Sorry"	3
1926	"But I Do, You Know I Do"	10
1927	"Thinking of You"	5
1927	"'Deed I Do"	2
1927	"Sam, the Old Accordion Man"	5
1927	"It All Depends on You"	8
1927	"Hoosier Sweetheart"	10
1927	"Wistful and Blue"	10
1927	"(What Do We Do) On a Dew-Dew-Dewy Day"	4
1927	"Shaking the Blues Away"	4
1927	"It All Belongs to Me"	17
1927	"I'm Nobody's Baby"	9
1928	"The Song Is Ended (but the Melody Lingers On)"	7
1928	"Together, We Two"	12
1928	"Keep Sweeping Cobwebs Off the Moon"	9
1928	"Back in Your Own Back Yard"	5
1928	"When You're with Somebody Else"	10
1928	"Ramona"	10
1928	"Say "Yes" Today"	11
1928	"Because My Baby Don't Mean Maybe Now"	10
1928	"Beloved"	10
1928	"Happy Days and Lonely Nights"	9
1928	"Sonny Boy"	6
1928	"My Blackbirds Are Bluebirds Now"	9

Year	Single	US Chart
1929	"Love Me or Leave Me"	2
1929	"I'm Bringing a Red, Red Rose"	15
1929	"You're the Cream in My Coffee"	15
1929	"I'll Get By (As Long as I Have You)"	3
1929	"Glad Rag Doll"	17
1929	"Mean to Me"	3
1929	"Button Up Your Overcoat"	15
1929	"Deep Night"	17
1929	"Ain't Misbehavin'"	16
1929	"What Wouldn't I Do for That Man"	9
1929	"The Right Kind of Man"	16
1929	"More Than You Know"	9
1930	"Cryin' for the Carolines"	15
1930	"Ten Cents a Dance"	5
1930	"Exactly Like You"	11
1930	"It Happened in Monterey"	19
1930	"Dancing with Tears in My Eyes"	10
1930	"Don't Tell Her What Happened to Me"	6
1930	"Body and Soul"	10
1930	"Just a Little Closer"	10
1930	"I'll Be Blue Just Thinking of You"	14
1931	"Reaching for the Moon"	6
1931	"Overnight"	18
1931	"Love Is like That"	5
1931	"Were You Sincere?"	11
1931	"I'm Good for Nothing but Love"	7
1931	"Now That You're Gone"	13
1931	"Guilty"	4
1931	"Good Night, Sweetheart"	17
1932	"Cuban Love Song"	10
1932	"When We're Alone"	8
1932	"The Night When Love Was Born"	14
1934	"Stars Fell on Alabama"	?
1935	"Life Is a Song"	1

Note: All of the above were Columbia releases. The following four were non-Columbia releases:

- (1932) "It Was So Beautiful" (U.S. chart position 13) Melotone Records
- (1933) "Try a Little Tenderness" (U.S. chart position 16) Melotone Records
- (1934) "Smoke Gets in Your Eyes" (U.S. chart position 15) Brunswick Records
- (1937) "In the Chapel in the Moonlight" (U.S. chart position 20) Decca Records

== Broadway ==
Ruth Etting's Broadway appearances are recorded at the Internet Broadway Database.

- Ziegfeld Follies of 1927 – in which she introduced Irving Berlin's "Shaking The Blues Away"
- Whoopee! (1928) – in which she introduced "Love Me or Leave Me"
- Nine-Fifteen Revue (1929) – in which she introduced "Get Happy"
- Simple Simon (1930) – in which she introduced "Ten Cents a Dance"
- Ziegfeld Follies of 1931

== Filmography ==
=== Short films ===
- The Book of Lovers (1929)
- Broadway's Like That (1930) - Ruth
- Roseland (1930) - Helen Leslie
- One Good Turn (1930) - Ruth Eton
- Stage Struck (1931)
- Old Lace (1931)
- Words & Music (1931) - Ruth Eton
- Radio Salutes (1931)
- A Mail Bride (1932)
- A Regular Trouper (1932) - Ruth Eton
- Artistic Temper (1932) - Ruth Whitney / Ruth White
- A Modern Cinderella (1932) - Anita Ragusa
- Bye-Gones (1933) - Aunt Ruth
- Along Came Ruth (1933) - Ruth Etting a.k.a. Ruth Eldridge

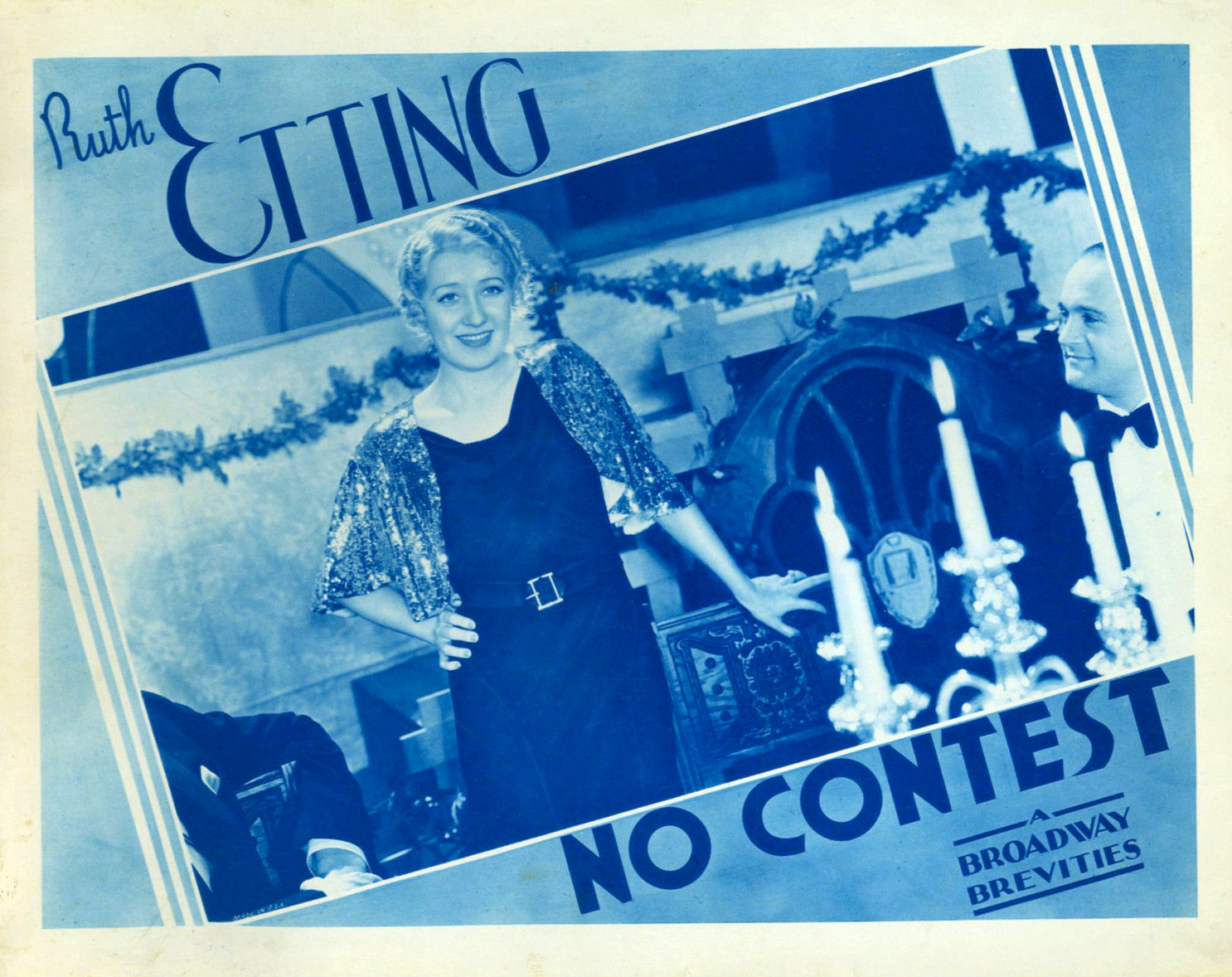
Lobby card from No Contest!, 1934

- Crashing the Gate (1933)
- Knee Deep in Music (1933)
- California Weather (1933)
- A Torch Tango (1934)
- The Song of Fame (1934) - Ruth Eaton
- Derby Decade (1934) - Della Delmar
- Southern Style (1934)
- No Contest! (1934) - Ruth
- Bandits and Ballads (1934)
- An Old Spanish Onion (1935)
- Ticket or Leave It (1935)
- Tuned Out (1935) - Ruth, the Dixie Song Bird
- Alladin from Manhattan (1936)
- Melody in May (1936) - herself
- Sleepy Time (1936) - (final film role)

=== Feature films ===
- Mr. Broadway (1933) - herself
- Roman Scandals (1933, her breakthrough film, which starred Eddie Cantor and Gloria Stuart) - Olga
- Hips, Hips, Hooray! (1934) - herself
- Gift of Gab (1934) - herself

== Sources ==
- Biesen, Sheri Chinen (2014). Music in the Shadows Noir Musical Films. The Johns Hopkins University Press. ISBN 978-1-4214-0838-5.
- Brideson, Cynthia; Brideson, Sara (2015). Ziegfeld and His Follies A Biography of Broadway's Greatest Producer. The University of Kentucky Press. ISBN 978-0-8131-6088-7.
- Commire, Anne; Klezmer, Deborah (2000). Women in World History: Ead-Fur. Yorkin Publications. ISBN 978-0-7876-4064-4. "Ruth, when you get through singing, just walk off the stage."
- Cullen, Frank (2007). Vaudeville old & new: an encyclopedia of variety performances in America, Volume 1. Psychology Press. ISBN 978-0-4159-3853-2.
- Friedwald, Will (2010). A Biographical Guide to the Great Jazz and Pop Singers. Pantheon Books. ISBN 978-0-3754-2149-5.
- Hemming, Roy; Hajdu, David, eds. (1992). Discovering Great Singers of Classic Pop: A New Listener's Guide to the Sounds and Lives of the Top Performers. Newmarket Press. ISBN 978-1-55704-148-7.
- Laird, Ross (1996). Moanin' Low: A Discography of Female Popular Vocal Recordings, 1920–1933. Greenwood Publishing Group. p. 175. ISBN 978-0-313-29241-5. "ruth etting."
- Lewis, John (2010). Radio Master: The Life and Times of Sports Broadcasting Great Ted Husing. Hillcrest Publishing Group. ISBN 978-1-936183-24-1.
- Marmorstein, Gary (2013). A Ship Without A Sail: The Life of Lorenz Hart. Simon and Schuster. ISBN 978-1-4165-9426-0.
- McLain, Susan R., ed. (2009). Butler County: The Boston Studio Collection. Arcadia Publishing. ISBN 978-0-7385-6051-9.
- Shaw, Arnold (1989). The Jazz Age: Popular Music in the 1920s. Oxford University Press. ISBN 978-0-1950-6082-9.
- Slide, Anthony, ed. (2012). The Encyclopedia of Vaudeville. Univ. Press of Mississippi. ISBN 978-1-61703-250-9.
- Spring, Katherine (2011). "'To Sustain Illusion is All That is Necessary': The Authenticity of Song Performance in Early American Sound Cinema". Film History. 23 (3). Indiana University Press: 285. doi:10.2979/filmhistory.23.3.285. ISSN 0892-2160. S2CID 142022287.
- Suskin, Steven, ed. (2010). Show Tunes: The Songs, Shows, and Careers of Broadway's Major Composers. Oxford University Press. ISBN 978-0-1998-8615-9.
- Whitburn, Joel (1986). Pop Memories: 1890–1954. Record Research. ISBN 0-89820-083-0.
- Wilson, Scott (2016). Resting Places. McFarland. ISBN 978-1-4766-2599-7.
