= Shakin' the Blues Away =

"Shaking the Blues Away"

Single by Ann Miller

from the album Easter Parade
- B-side: "Steppin' Out with My Baby" (Fred Astaire)
- Released: 1949 (Australia)
- Label: MGM
- Songwriter: Irving Berlin

Music video
- "It Only Happens When I Dance with You" on YouTube

"Shaking the Blues Away" (alt. sp.: "Shakin' the Blues Away") is a song written by Irving Berlin and introduced in the Ziegfeld Follies of 1927 by Ruth Etting.

In the same year, Etting recorded it for the Columbia record label.

== Composition ==
Colin Larkin in his The Encyclopedia of Popular Music describes the song as one of Berlin's "more light-hearted pieces" of the late 1920s.

== Easter Parade ==
The song was later revived in the 1948 MGM musical film Easter Parade, where Nadine Hale (played by Ann Miller) performs it on stage in the production of the Ziegfeld Follies of 1912. The book Tap Dancing America: A Cultural History calls that number "the snazziest song-and-dance in 1940s musical film". When Miller was singing the chorus – "Shaking the blues away, unhappy news away / If you were blue, it's easy to, shake of your cares and troubles", – she was "strutting like a runway model directly into the eye of the camera while swiveling hips, shaking shoulders, and slicing the air with her long-gloved arms", the book describes vividly.

Peter Levinson in his Puttin' On the Ritz: Fred Astaire and the Fine Art of Panache, A Biography calls the dance number "shimmering".

Desirée J. Garcia in her book The Dressing Room: Backstage Lives and American Film opines that in that scene Nadine, by "emulat[ing] Black dance movements" ("Do like the voodoos do, list'ning to a voodoo melody, they shake their bodies so, to and fro"), "embodies the Black performer".
