= Eitel Brothers =

German family of four hoteliers and restaurateurs

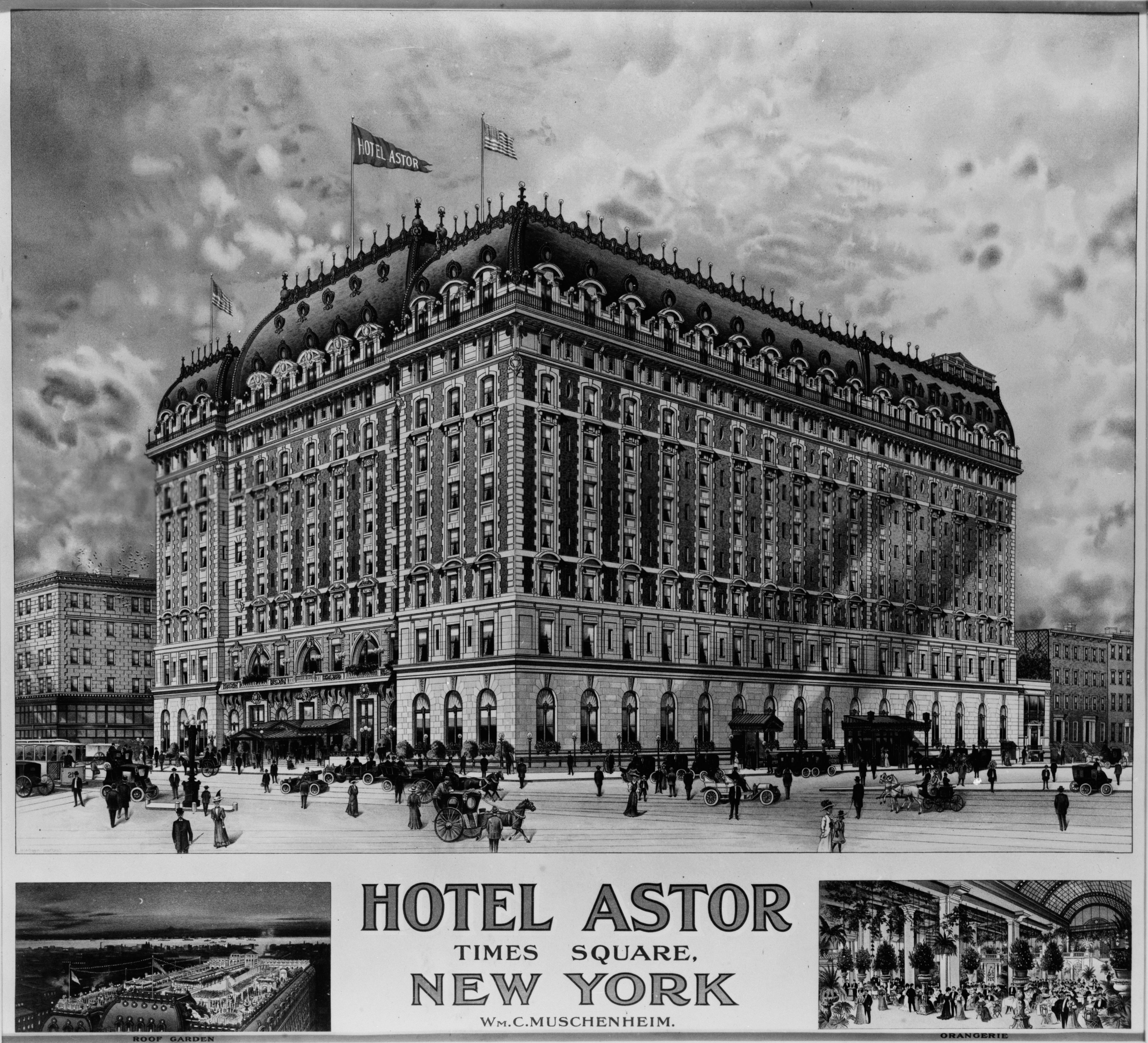
- Hotel Astor, New York, postcard ca. 1900–1910.
- Occupation: Hoteliers/restaurateurs
- Known for: Bismarck Hotel, Marigold Gardens, Old Heidelberg Inn

The Eitel Brothers refers to a family of four brothers, Emil, Karl, Robert and Max Eitel, originating from Stuttgart in Germany who, from 1894, were hoteliers and restaurateurs in Chicago, US. They were well known for the luxury hotel Bismarck Hotel and restaurants such as the Marigold Gardens and the Old Heidelberg Inn. Typically excluded is Albert Eitel, who remained in Stuttgart as an architect.

== Overview ==
In 1890 Emil Eitel emigrated to the United States and settled in Chicago, amongst other German immigrants. In 1890 Chicago had about 160,000 and in 1900 about 170,000 residents of German ancestry, representing 15% and 10% of the total population (#Hofmeister 1976, page 10). The heavily German population and the infrastructure built around the community of German immigrants greatly helped their business ventures to succeed.

After Emil Eitel had made a start, he was followed by four of his brothers to Chicago: Charles in 1891, Robert in 1898, Max in 1901 and Otto in 1912. After his immigration, Otto Eitel (October 5, 1884, Stuttgart – May 5, 1972, Chicago), took over the responsibility for the hotel and garden facilities of the Bismarck Hotel. He later moved to California and worked as a landscape gardener. Albert Eitel remained in Stuttgart, though he is recorded as having visited in 1896 and 1924:

- In 1896, he volunteered in the prestigious architectural firm of Daniel Burnham, a leading figure in the Chicago School.
- In 1924, Albert Eitel was in Chicago for creating the facade design of the Bismarck hotel together with the architectural firm Rapp and Rapp and to plan the interior of the hotel.

The brothers Emil and Karl founded in Chicago the Bismarck Hotel and the Bismarck Gardens. Robert and Max Eitel operated several large restaurants, including the Old Heidelberg Inn and some fair restaurants. They were patrons of the Chicago Symphony Orchestra and Art Institute of Chicago. In 1938, Emil Eitel donated to the Institute at least 17 lithographs and etchings, and in 1948, a calendar of Regiomontanus from 1476. They were also active in local social clubs. In the wake of the World Wars Emil and Karl Eitel participated in relief efforts of the Red Cross for Germany.

== Early life ==
The parents of the Eitel brothers were Emil Eitel and Charlotte Eitel née Trost. Trost gave birth to 11 children, out of which three died before their first birthday. Among those who survived six brothers Emil, Karl, Robert, Max, Otto and Albert Eitel, are known as the Eitel brothers. All the children of Trost who survived beyond their first birthday are listed below.

Number	Name	Birth		Death		Emigration
1	Emil Eitel	1865	Stuttgart	1948	Chicago	1890
2	Albert Eitel	1866	Stuttgart	1934	Stuttgart	
3	Karl Eitel	1871	Stuttgart	1954	Santa Barbara, California	1891
4	Charlotte Emma Krauss	1873	Stuttgart			
5	Robert Eitel	1877	Stuttgart	1948		1898
6	Louise Emilie Charlotte Frank	1881	Stuttgart			
7	Max Eitel	1882	Stuttgart	1954	Chicago	1901
8	Otto Eitel	1884	Stuttgart	1972	Chicago	1912

== Emil Eitel ==
Main sources: #NCAB 1967, pages 510-511; #Leonard 1905–1917; #Sonntagspost 1929.1; #Amtsblatt 1953.1.

Emil Eitel (February 27, 1865 Stuttgart – July 18, 1948 Chicago) was a German hotel and restaurant contractor in Chicago. He was born as the first child of his parents, Emil and Charlotte Eitel, attended the trade school in Stuttgart, and served in the Army as a one-year volunteer before beginning, in 1885, to work in his father's factory on the production of photo albums.

=== Professional life ===
In 1890, Emil Eitel moved to the United States and settled in Chicago. He first worked as a clerk for the Chicago company "Bond's Commercial Agency". In 1891, as his brother Charles also came to Chicago, the two founded a wholesale wine and liquor imports business named "Eitel Brothers". During the World's Columbian Exposition in 1893, the first Chicagoan World's Fair, they operated their first hotel in the vicinity of the exhibition grounds. The success prompted them to permanently turn to the hotel business. They took over the hotel "Germania" and renamed it "Bismarck Hotel". In 1894, they founded the Bismarck Hotel Company. Emil Eitel presided as President and Chief Financial Officer until his death in 1948. Besides the hotel, the two brothers operated from 1895 to 1923 the Bismarck Gardens (later Marigold Gardens), a beer garden.

=== Personal life ===
In 1894, Emil Eitel married Emma Caroline Boldenweck (1868–1943), whom he had met in Stuttgart.

== Karl Eitel ==
Main sources: #NCAB 1967, page 511; #Leonard 1905–1917; #Sonntagspost 1929.2; #Amtsblatt 1953.1.

Karl Friedrich (Frederick) Eitel (January 17, 1871 Stuttgart – March 19, 1954 Santa Barbara, California) was a German hotel and restaurant contractor in Chicago. He was the fifth child of parents Emil and Charlotte Eitel. After attending the high school in Stuttgart, he studied at the Königlich Württembergisches Technikum für Textilindustrie (Royal School of Textile Engineering of Württemberg) in Reutlingen.

=== Professional life ===
In 1891, Karl Eitel emigrated to Chicago and began collaborating with his brother Emil. After the founding of the Bismarck Hotel Company, he assumed the office of the Vice President and Secretary and after the death of Emil Eitel in 1948, the office of President. A year later, he retired, but remained joined to the company until his death in 1954 as honorary chairman. (On the history of the hotel and restaurant projects of the two brothers see Bismarck Hotel Co.)

=== Personal life ===
In 1896, Karl Eitel married his first wife Marieluise Boldenweck (1875–1913), a younger sister of his sister-in-law Emma. The marriage produced four children, among them Otto K. Eitel, who later became president of the Bismarck Hotel. In 1915, Karl Eitel joined in his second marriage Ann Schmidt (1884-1919), the daughter of a factory owner from Brussels, whom he had one daughter with. In his third marriage he joined Suzanne Schmidt (1888–1968), the sister of his second wife. From this marriage, he had three children.

Karl Eitel took many years an active part in social and political life in Chicago. He died on March 9, 1954, in Santa Barbara at the age of 83 and was buried at the Santa Barbara Cemetery.

== Max Eitel ==
Main sources: #NCAB 1967, pages 518-519; #Amtsblatt 1953.1.

Max Eitel (September 29, 1882 Stuttgart – June 5, Chicago) was a German restaurant contractor in Chicago. He was born as the tenth child of his parents Emil and Charlotte Eitel.

=== Professional life ===
In 1901, Max Eitel emigrated to Chicago. He went into the accounting department of the Bismarck Hotel Company, owned by his brothers Emil and Karl. He returned to Europe, studying the hotel and restaurant industries of England, France, and the Netherlands. In 1904, he took a position in the newly built luxury Hotel Astor on Times Square in New York, which was founded in the same year by the German emigrants William C. Muschenheim (1855–1918) and Frederick A. Muschenheim. There he volunteered for two consecutive years in various departments of the hotel. In 1906, he took over responsibility for the import business of his brothers, and soon thereafter the management of the beer garden Marigold Gardens, which also belonged to his brothers.

Following the closure of the beer garden due to Prohibition, in 1923 he and his brother Robert Eitel, founded the restaurant company Eitel Incorporated, with Robert as President and himself as Vice President, Secretary, and Treasurer. When Robert died in 1948, Max took over the presidency, which he held until his death.

The Eitel Incorporated company included the following restaurants:

- 1923–1943: Five station restaurants in the Chicago and North Western Railway Station.
- 1933–1934: Fair restaurant Old Heidelberg Inn (2500 seats) on the second Chicagoan World's Fair (Century of Progress).
- 1934: Fair restaurant in the German pavilion Black Forest Village (Schwarzwalddorf) on the same World's Fair.
- Ab 1934: Old Heidelberg Inn at Chicago's formerly Broadway in Randolph Street.
- Ab 1935: Eitel Field Building Restaurant]in Chicago's financial district.
- 1936: Fair restaurant Black Forest Restaurant on the Texas Centennial Exposition 1936 in Dallas.
- 1939–1940: Fair restaurant Ballentine Three Ring Inn (2000 seats) on the World's Fair in New York.

See Eitel Incorporated for descriptions and illustrations of the permanent restaurants belonging to Eitel Incorporated.

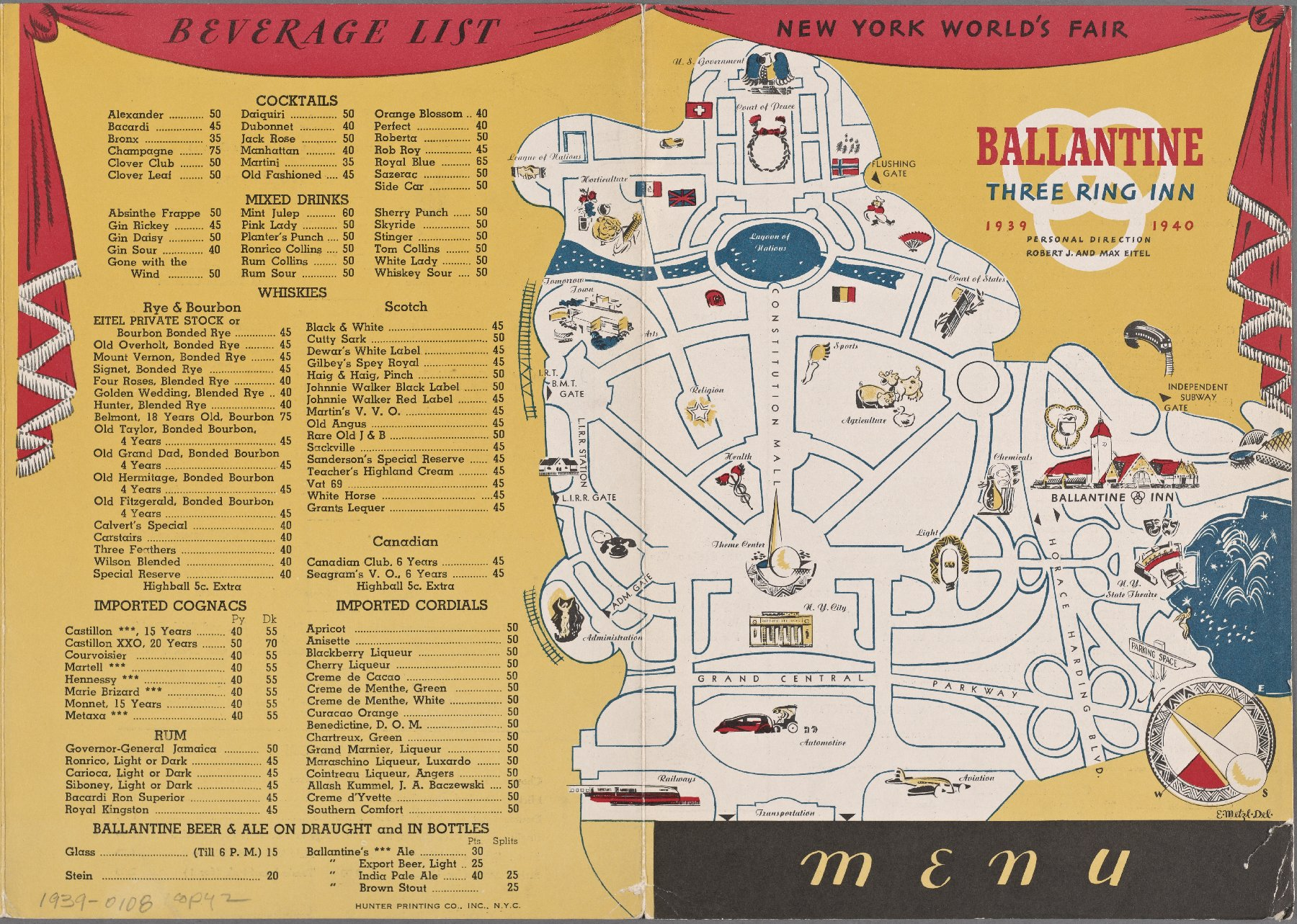
Ballentine Three Ring Inn, World's Fair New York 1939–1940, menu.

=== Personal life ===
In 1911, Max Eitel married as his first wife, the widow Marie Heine née Bush (?–1934), the daughter of a German manufacturer, who bore him two children. In 1935, he joined in his second marriage, the widow Ella Gleich née Harder, the daughter of a German real estate agent. They had no children. Max Eitel died on June 5, 1954, in Chicago.

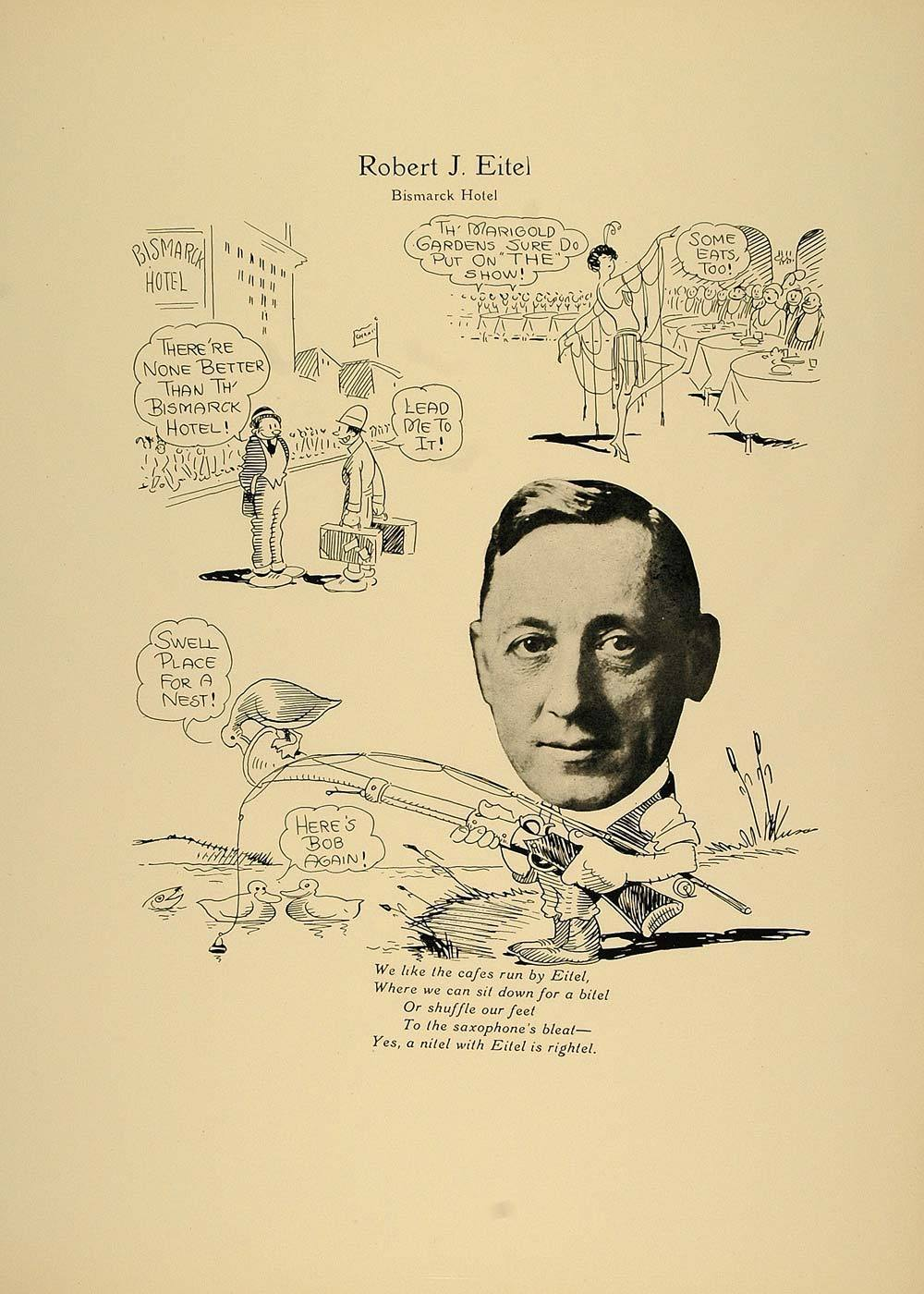
Robert Eitel, advertising postcard, 1923.

== Robert Eitel ==
Main sources: #NCAB 1967, pages 518-519; #Amtsblatt 1953.1.

Robert Eitel (June 16, 1877 Stuttgart – 1948) was a German restaurant contractor in Chicago. He was the eighth child of his parents Emil and Charlotte Eitel.

In 1898, Robert emigrated to Chicago. In the 1920s, he was director of the Bismarck Hotel. In 1923, he founded together with his brother Max Eitel the restaurant company Eitel Incorporated and became its president. – On the history of the restaurant projects of the two brothers see Max Eitel, Business life.

== Bismarck Hotel Co. ==
Company name	Bismarck Hotel Co.
Owners	Emil and Karl Eitel
Foundation	1894
Object	operation of the Bismarck Hotel and the Marigold Gardens
Presidents	1894–1948: Emil Eitel
	1948–1949: Karl Eitel
	1949–1956: Otto K. Eitel

=== Bismarck Hotel (1894–1956) ===
Following the successful operation of their restaurant on the 1893 World's Fair, Emil and Karl Eitel bought an existing hotel, rebuilt it and renamed it the Bismarck Hotel. This hotel was replaced in 1926 by the construction of a large luxury hotel under the same name. A chronology of the Bismarck Hotel:

==== Fair hotel (1893) ====
Chicago, Cottage Grove Avenue / Sixty-Third Street, 41.780433°N 87.605912°W.

Due to the strong demand of its German and Austrian suppliers for accommodation for the first Chicago World's Fair 1893 (World's Columbian Exposition), the Eitel brothers rented an apartment house near the fairgrounds and converted it to a hotel with 150 beds.

==== Old Bismarck Hotel (1894–1924) ====
Chicago, Randolph Street / Wells Street, 41.884403°N 87.633756°W.

After the huge success of their fair hotel the brothers decided to set up a permanent hotel. They purchased the four-story Germania Hotel with 50 beds in Chicago's Loop district, at Chicago's formerly Broadway in Randolph Street and close to the financial district. Within one year they increased the bed capacity through the purchase of adjacent buildings to 100 beds. With the permission of the German Chancellor Otto von Bismarck they were allowed to call the hotel Bismarck Hotel. Due to the anti-German sentiment during the First World War the hotel was renamed temporarily to Randolph Hotel.

==== New Bismarck Hotel (1926–1956) ====
Chicago, Randolph Street / LaSalle Street / West Court Place / Wells Street, 41.884395°N 87.633349°W.

In 1922, the Eitels realigned their property to the so-called Eitel Block, which covered the northern part of the block between Randolph and Washington Street and Wells and LaSalle Street. In 1924, they razed the buildings in the Eitel Block and built a skyscraper in 1925 and 1926. It consisted of the 22-story Metropolitan Office Building and the 19-story hotel wing which hosted the Hotel Bismarck with its 600 beds and the Palace Theater, which held 2500 seats. The famous Walnut Room ballroom hosted numerous big bands and orchestras during the late 1930s and 1940s including Art Kassel and his Kassels in the air whose performances were carried live every Saturday night on WGN radio in Chicago. The orchestra featured singer, Marion Holmes, who recorded several songs with them including one on Blue Bird Records that became immensely popular, "I'm a Little Tea Pot" in 1941. Marion met her husband to be during one such performance, Broadway/film/television star, Don DeFore. He was touring in Chicago starring in Broadway's number one comedy of the year, "Where Do We Go From Here." ["Growing Up in Disneyland" Waldorf Publishing 2019 by Ron DeFore ISBN 1643166263] In 1956, Otto K. Eitel sold the hotel to the hotel and sports entrepreneur Arthur Wirtz. After a period of slow decline, the hotel was closed in 1996, and reopened in 1998 by the Kimpton group under the name Hotel Allegro.

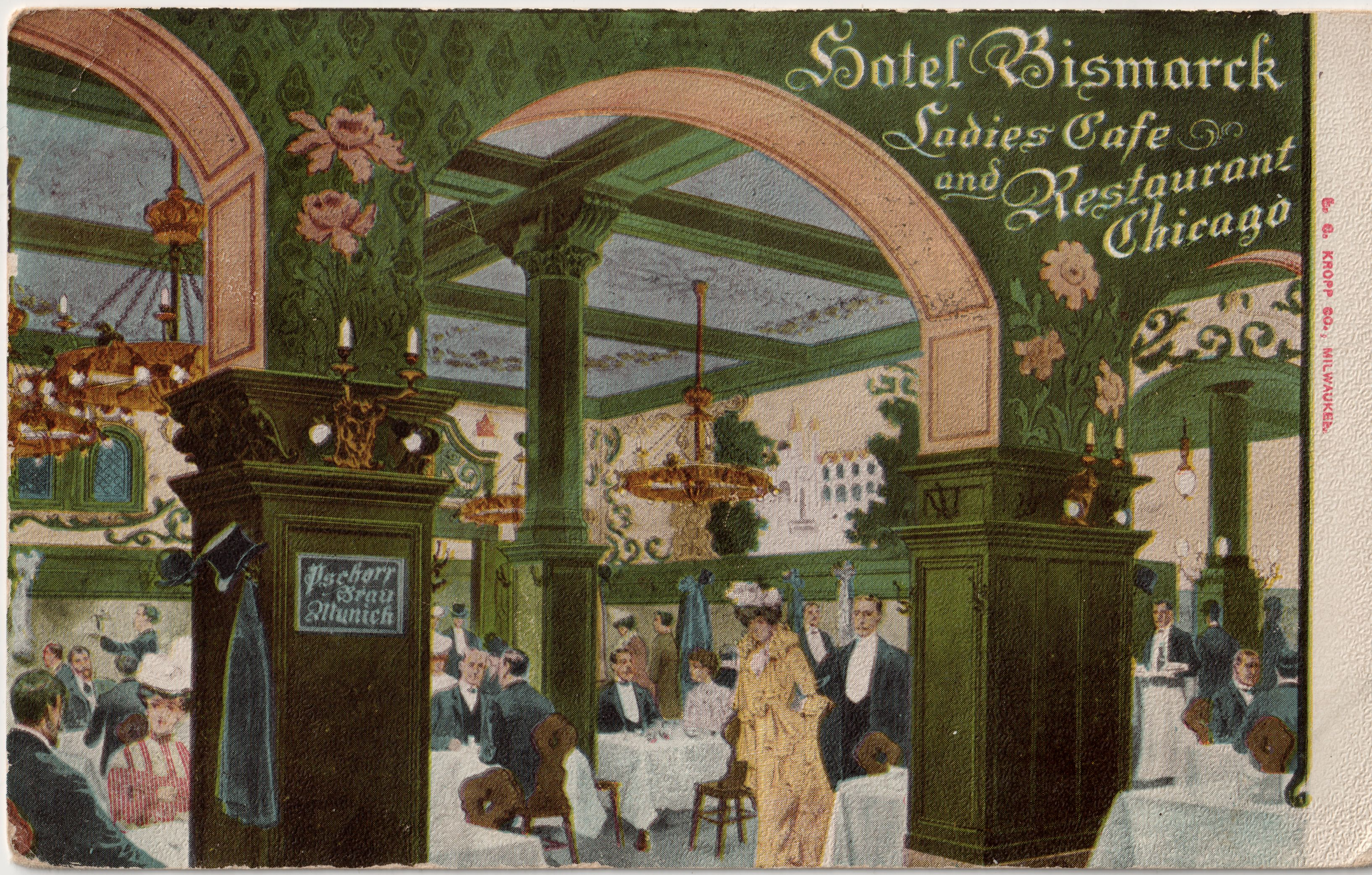
Old Hotel Bismarck Ladies Cafe and Restaurant, about 1908

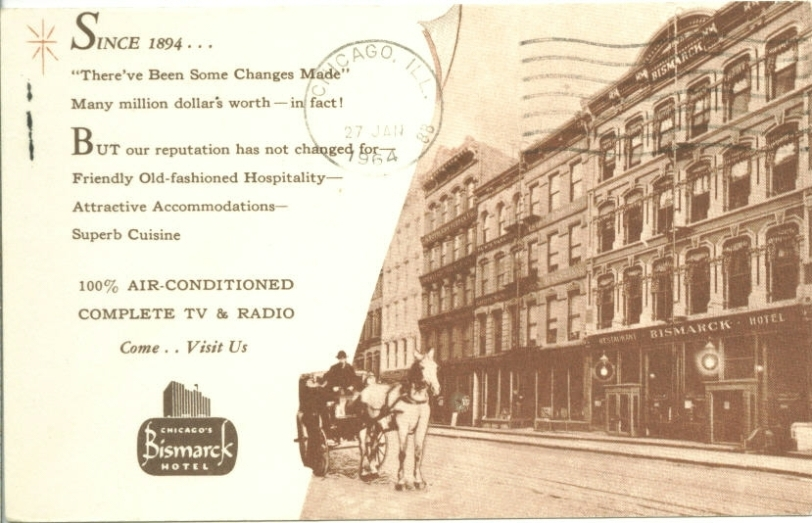
Old Bismarck Hotel (until 1924), picture vor 1925.

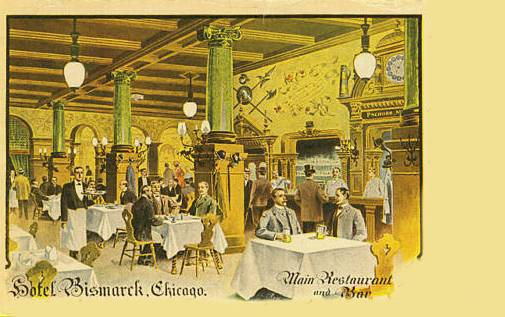
Same, Main Dining Room, postcard 1905.

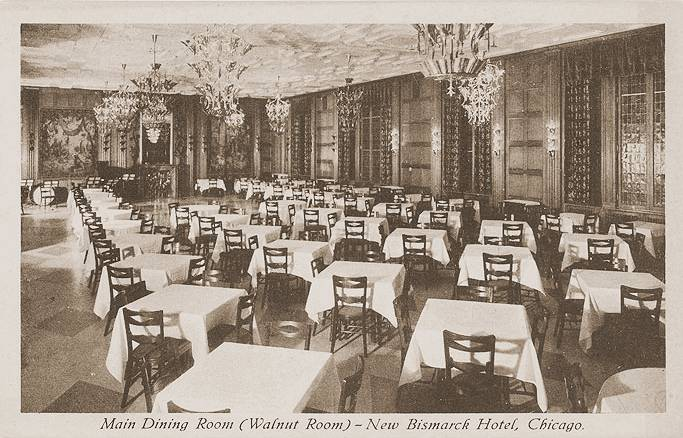
Same, Main Dining Room (Walnut Room), picture 1926.

=== Marigold Gardens (1895–1923) ===
Chicago, 3760 North Halsted Street, 41.950921°N 87.649873°W.

In 1895, Emil and Karl Eitel bought the popular beer garden DeBerg's Grove in the north of Chicago, rebuilt it, and called it Bismarck Gardens in line with their hotel's name. The gardens was themed after a typical German beer garden of the time, with daily outdoor music shows and the largest outdoor wooden dance floor in Chicago. Also built was the Marigold Room was used as a concert hall during winter.

Reportedly, President William Howard Taft described the Marigold Gardens even as a "national institution". Because of anti-German sentiment, the Bismarck Gardens were renamed during the First World War as Marigold Gardens. In 1923, the brothers sold the Marigold Gardens, due to Prohibition.

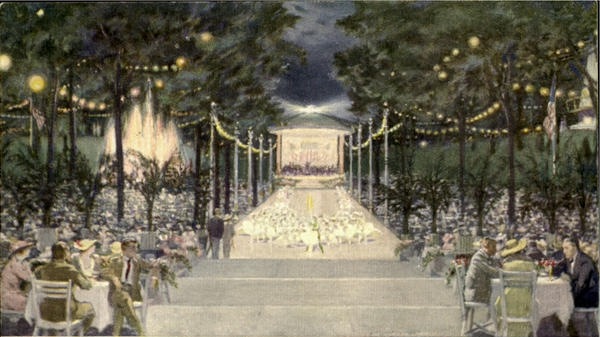
Beer garden with dance floor, picture before 1924.

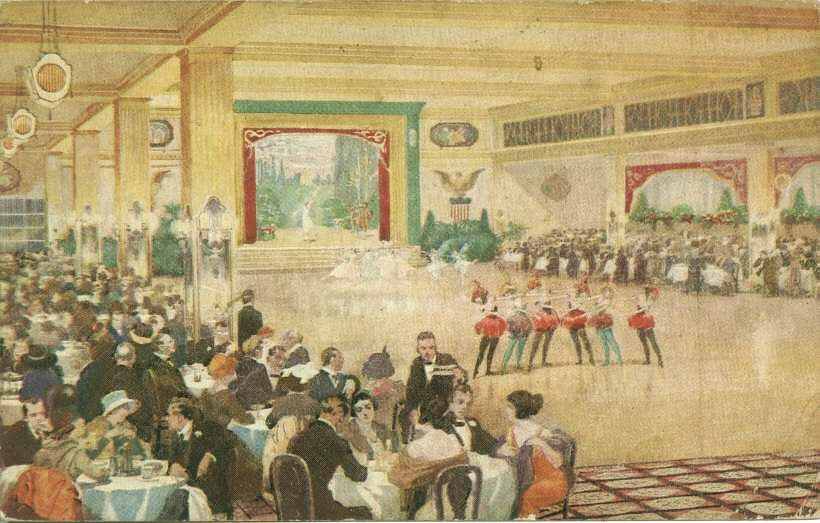
Marigold Room, picture before 1924.

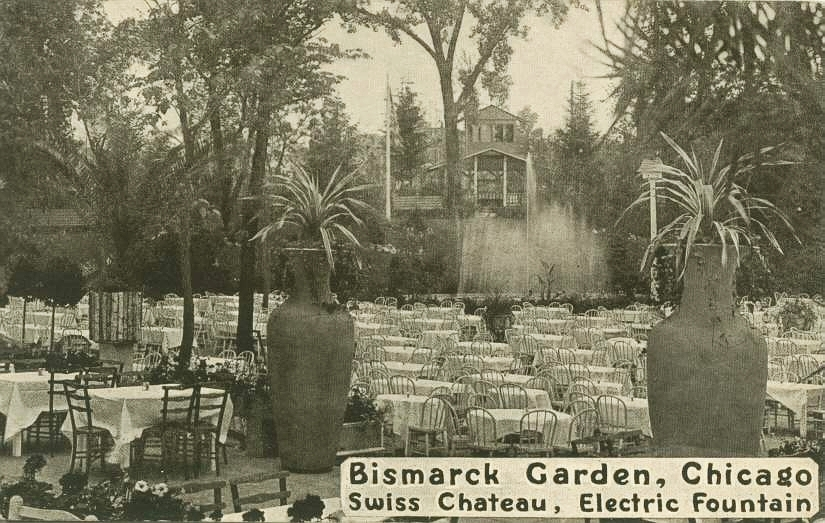
Beer garden with Swiss Chateau and Electric Fountain, picture before 1924.

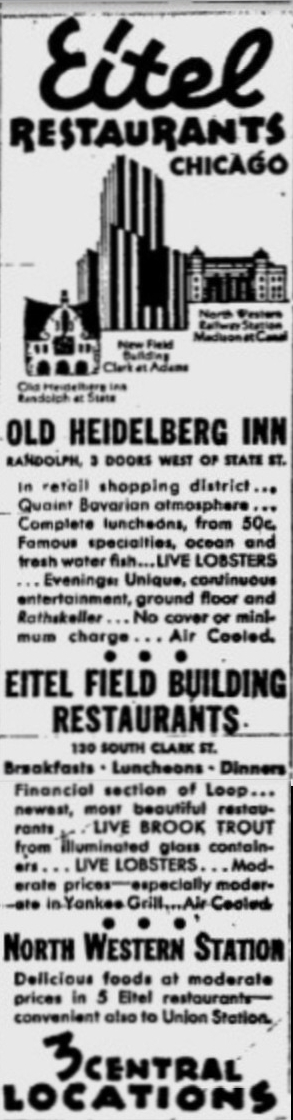
Advertisement for the three Eitel Restaurants, 1935.

== Eitel Incorporated ==
Company name	Eitel Incorporated
Owners	Robert and Max Eitel
Foundation	1923
Object	operation of restaurants
Presidents	1923–1948: Robert Eitel
	1948–1954: Max Eitel

=== Chicago and North Western Railway Station Restaurants (1923–1943) ===
Chicago, Clinton Street / Canal Street / Madison Street / Randolph Street, 41.882215°N 87.640582°W.

From 1923 to 1943 Robert and Max Eitel operated five restaurants with bakery and laundry facilities in the Chicago and North Western Railway station. The laundry performed also as a service provider for the Pullman Company's sleeping cars.

=== Old Heidelberg Inn (since 1894) ===
Chicago, 14 West Randolph Street, 41.884863°N 87.628525°W.

After the end of the first Chicagoan World's Fair, Max and Robert Eitel built on 14 West Randolph Street, the restaurant, the Old Heidelberg Inn. It had an old German facade and was decorated to resemble a Bavarian beer cellar. The restaurant housed at the ground floor the Grand Dining Room "Old Heidelberg" with a stage for the orchestra, the "Rathskeller" in the basement, the "Rialto Room", a bakery and a ballroom.

=== Eitel Field Building Restaurant (since 1935) ===
Chicago, 130 South Clark Street, 41.8798°N 87.6316°W.

In 1935, the two brothers opened the Eitel Field Building Restaurant in the newly built Field Building on 130 South Clark Street..

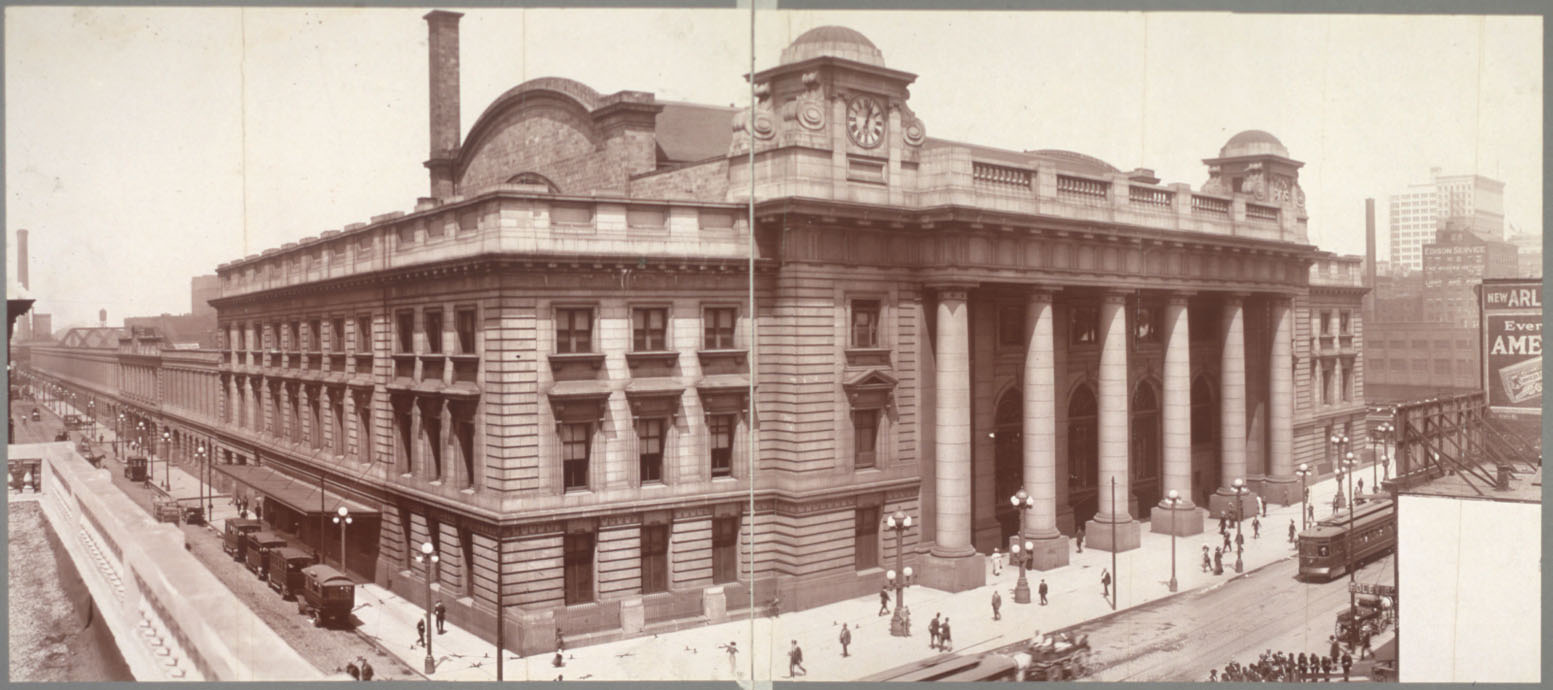
Chicago and North Western Railway Station, picture 1911.

== Bibliography ==
Basics: #NCAB 1967; #Ashley 1947; #Navarro 2010.1.

=== General ===
- Fred J. Ashley: The house of Eitel. Aristocrats in hospitality, Chicago [1947?].
- Sechs Stuttgarter schrieben wichtiges Kapitel amerikanischer Hotelgeschichte. In: Amtsblatt der Stadt Stuttgart no. 45, November 12, 1953, page 13.
- Eitel Restaurants Chicago. In: The Ludington Daily News Juli 31, 1935, page 4 .
- Eitel news, summer, 1934. About the restaurants operated by Eitel, Inc. both in downtown Chicago and on the fair grounds of A Century of Progress Exposition, Chicago 1934.
- Karl Götz: Brüder über Land und Meer. Schicksale und Geschichten der Ausgewanderten, Bodman 1967, pages 114–115.
- John William Leonard: The book of Chicagoans. A biographical dictionary of leading living men of the city of Chicago, Chicago 1905, page 186 , Chicago 1911, pages 211-212 , Chicago 1917, page 210 .
- The national cyclopedia of American biography [NCAB], volume 41, Clifton, NJ 1967, pages 510–511, 518–519.
- Emil Eitel. In: Sonntagspost, Chicago September 29, 1929.
- Who Does Not Know Him? Karl Eitel. In: Sonntagspost, Chicago Oktober 20, 1929.

=== Bismarck Hotel ===
- William R. Host; Brooke Ahne Portmann: Early Chicago Hotels, Charleston, SC 2006, pages 33–35 .
- L.: New Bismarck-Hotel in Chicago. Moderne deutsche Einrichtungskunst in Amerika. In: Innendekoration 38.1927, pages 254–272.
- Meg McSherry Breslin: Bringing Back The Bismarck Hotel. Historic Inn’s New Owners Hope To Recapture The Past. In: Chicago Tribune News January 10, 1997 .
- Jennifer Navarro: Kimpton’s Hotel Allegro Chicago. Historical Background, Chicago 2010, online only .
- Jennifer Navarro: Kimpton’s Hotel Allegro Invites Guests to Step into the Limelight. Historic hotel welcomes travelers with red-carpet treatment, Chicago 2010, online only .
- Wolfgang Pfleiderer: Neue Werkkunst. Architekt Albert Eitel Stuttgart, Berlin 1929, Tafel 38–40.
- Frank Alfred Randall; John D. Randall: History of the Development of Building Construction in Chicago, Urbana 1999, page 312 .
- Charles A. Sengstock: That Toddlin’ Town. Chicago’s White Dance Bands And Orchestras, 1900-1950, Urbana 2004 .
- New Yorker Staatszeitung und Herold November 12, 1953.

=== Sources ===
- Address books of the City of Stuttgart, Stadtarchiv Stuttgart.
- Ehrung eines Schwaben in Chicago. In: Amtsblatt der Stadt Stuttgart Juli 2, 1953.
- The Chicago Blue Book of selected names of Chicago and suburban towns. Names and addresses of prominent residents, arranged alphabetically and numerically by streets; also ladies’ shopping guide, street directory, and other valuable information. For the year ending 1890...1915, Chicago 1889...1914 .
- Familienregister der Stadt Stuttgart, volume 19, sheet 875 (Jakob Gottfried Emil Eitel), volume 1, sheet 1080 (Christian Friedrich Eitel), volume 10, sheet 781 (Johann Friedrich Trost), Stadtarchiv Stuttgart.
- The one hundredth anniversary of Germania Club, 1865–1965. A century of German-American traditions, civic responsibility and ideals, Chicago 1965.
- Christiane Harzig: Germans. In: Encyclopedia of Chicago, Chicago 2005, online only .
- Rudolf A. Hofmeister: The Germans of Chicago, Champaign, IL 1976.
- ...ster Jahresbericht Schwaben Verein Chicago, Kassenbericht und Mitgliederverzeichnis, Chicago 1922...1937.
- Schwaben Verein von Chicago. Festschrift zur 50sten Stiftungsfeier. 31. März 1878–31. März 1928, Chicago 1928.
- Eitel Brothers face U. S. action under dry law. In: Chicago Daily Tribune January 7, 1920.
