= Lee Morse discography =

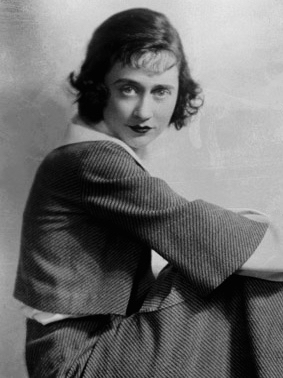
Morse in 1927

Lee Morse was an American singer, songwriter, composer, and guitarist, who worked primarily in the genres of jazz and blues music in the 1920s and 1930s. She garnered significant fame in the mid-1920s, and became one of the most celebrated recording artists in the world. She was marketed as "America’s Leading Singer of Blues and Southern Mammy Songs."

Morse's discography includes over 60 singles of both self-composed and cover recordings, most of which were released by Perfect and Columbia Records in the 1920s. Morse continued to release singles with Columbia throughout the 1930s, as well as several releases for Decca Records. By the 1930s, however, Morse's professional career was in decline, as she struggled significantly with alcoholism. She frequently missed live engagements during this period, and her output of recorded material dwindled by the latter half of the decade.

Morse released two singles in 1950 through Decca, before dying unexpectedly in 1954. Several compilation albums chronicling her career have been released posthumously.

== Singles ==
=== 1920s ===
Year	Title (A-side / b-side)	Label	Cat. #	Notes	Ref.
1924	"Bring Back Those Rock-A-Bye Baby Days" / "Mail Man Blues"	Perfect	12165		
1925	"Me Neenyah" / "Golden Dream Girl"	Perfect	12182		
1925	"I Like Pie, I Like Cake" / "Home"	Perfect	12189		
1925	"In Old Madrid" / "Juanita"	Perfect	11216		
1925	"A Miss in Mississippi" / "Don't Try to Cry Your Way Back to Me"	Perfect	12197		
1925	"Are You Sorry" / "The Shadows On The Wall"	Perfect	11581	As Miss Lee Morse and Her Bluegrass Boys	
1925	"Too Tired" / "I Want To See My Tennessee"	Perfect	12179		
1925	"Yes Sir, That's My Baby" / "Ukulele Lady"	Pathé	10949		
1925	"Sweet Man" / "I'se Gwine Back To Dixie"	Perfect	11591	As Miss Lee Morse and Her Bluegrass Boys	
1925	"Dallas Blues" / "Rocking Chair Blues "	Perfect	11582		
1925	"Cecilia" / "Blue Soldier Blues"	Perfect	11586		
1925	"What-Cha-Call-'Em-Blues" / "Only This Time I'll Be True"	Perfect	11590	As Miss Lee Morse and Her Bluegrass Boys	
1925	"All Alone" / "Lee's Lullaby"	Perfect	12181		
1926	"Lonesome and Sorry" / "A Little Love"	Pathé	25184	As Miss Lee Morse and Her Bluegrass Boys	
1926	"My Old Kentucky Home" / "Old Folks At Home"	Perfect	11600		
1926	"He's Still My Baby" / "Sad and Lonesome Little Pickaninny"	Perfect	25194		
1926	"Bolshevik"	Perfect	11273		
1926	"To-Night You Belong to Me" / "If You're Missing Me"	Perfect	11631		
1926	"I Wonder Where My Baby Is To-Night" / "My Sugar Babe"	Perfect	11599		
1926	"Animal Crackers" / "My Red-Headed, Blue-Eyed Colleen"	Perfect	11624	As Miss Lee Morse and Her Bluegrass Boys	
1927	"The Little White House" / "Lonely Nights "	Perfect	11635	As Miss Lee Morse and Her Bluegrass Boys	
1927	"Side By Side" / "My Idea Of Heaven"	Columbia	947-D		
1927	"We" / "Rosita"	Columbia	1082-D		
1927	"I've Looked All Over For A Girl Like You" / "Dawning"	Columbia	1149-D		
1927	"Where the Wild Flowers Grow" / "I'd Love to Be in Love"	Columbia	1011-D		
1927	"Somebody Said" / "I Hate to Say Goodbye"	Columbia	1063-D		
1927	"Did You Mean It?" / "Old-Fashioned Romance"	Columbia	1199-D		
1928	"Keep Sweeping the Cobwebs off the Moon" / "Give Me a Good-Night Kiss"	Columbia	1276-D		
1928	"Poor Butterfly Waits For Me" / "After We Kiss"	Columbia	1328-D		
1928	"In the Sing Song Sycamore Tree" / "I'm Lonely"	Columbia	1381-D		
1928	"When I Lost You" / "Lonesome For You"	Columbia	1434-D		
1928	"Be Sweet to Me" / "Don't Keep Me in the Dark, Bright Eyes"	Columbia	1466-D		
1928	"Mother and Dad" / "Shadows on the Wall"	Columbia	1497-D		
1928	"We (My Honey and Me)" / "Rosita"	Columbia	1082-D		
1928	"Mississippi Mud" / "I Must Have That Man!"	Columbia	1584-D	With the Blue Grass Boys	
1928	"Let's Do It" / "If You Want the Rainbow"	Columbia	1659-D	With the Blue Grass Boys	
1928	"You Are My Own" / "Where the Shy Little Violets Grow"	Columbia	1716-D	With the Blue Grass Boys	
1928	"Main Street" / "Susianna"	Columbia	1752-D	With the Blue Grass Boys	
1929	"Old Man Sunshine, Little Boy Blue Bird" / "Don't Be Like That"	Columbia	1621-D	With the Blue Grass Boys	

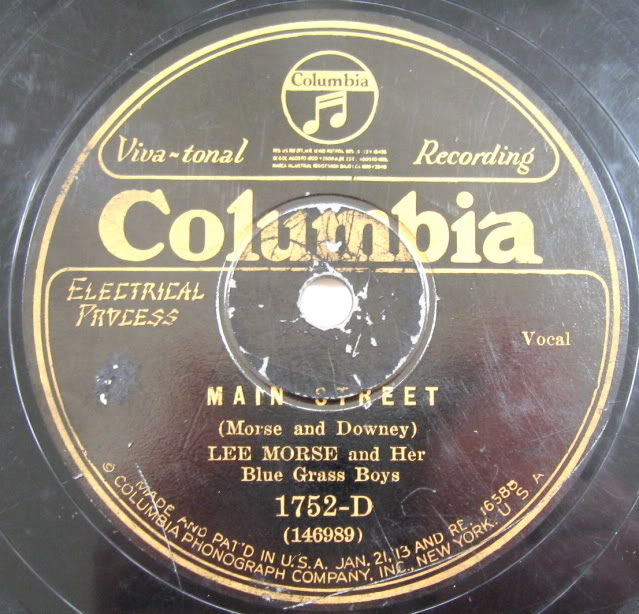
Lee Morse Main Street

=== 1930s ===
Year	Title (A-side / b-side)	Label	Cat. #	Notes	Ref.
1930	"Until Love Comes Along" / "Blue, Turning Grey Over You"	Columbia	2101-D	With the Blue Grass Boys	
1930	"Tain't No Sin (To dance around in your bones)"/ "I'm Following You "	Columbia	2136-D	With the Blue Grass Boys	
1930	"Cooking Breakfast for the One I Love" / "Sing, You Sinners"	Columbia	2165-D	With the Blue Grass Boys	
1930	"Swingin' in a Hammock" / "Seems to Me"	Columbia	2225-D	With the Blue Grass Boys	
1930	"Little White Lies" / "Nobody Cares if I'm Blue"	Columbia	2248-D	With the Blue Grass Boys	
1930	"Just a Little While" / "When the Organ Played at Twilight"	Columbia	2308-D	With the Blue Grass Boys	
1930	"Wasting My Love on You" / "Loving You the Way I Do"	Columbia	2333-D	With the Blue Grass Boys	
1930	"You're Driving Me Crazy!" / "He's My Secret Passion"	Columbia	2348-D	With the Blue Grass Boys	
1930	"The Little Things in Life" / "Tears"	Columbia	2365-D	With the Blue Grass Boys	
1931	"I'm One of God's Children (Who Hasn't Got Wings)" / "Blue Again"	Columbia	2388-D	With the Blue Grass Boys	
1931	"Walkin' My Baby Back Home" / "I've Got Five Dollars"	Columbia	2417-D	With the Blue Grass Boys	
1931	"The Tune That Never Grows Old" / "By My Side"	Columbia	2436-D	With the Blue Grass Boys	
1931	"Let's Get Friendly" / "I'm Thru with Love"	Columbia	2474-D	With the Blue Grass Boys	
1931	"It's the Girl!" / "I'm An Unemployed Sweetheart (Looking for Someone to Love)"	Columbia	2497-D	With the Blue Grass Boys	
1931	"Love Letters in the Sand" / "Mood Indigo"	Columbia	2530-D	With the Blue Grass Boys	
1931	"Call Me Darling (Call Me Sweetheart, Call Me Dear)" / "I'm For You a Hundred Percent"	Columbia	2564-D	With the Blue Grass Boys	
1932	"One Hour With You" / Medley - "Paradise" Waltz	Columbia	18001-D	With Eddy Duchin and His Central Park Casino Orchestra	
1932	"When the Lights Are Soft and Low" / "Lawd, You Made the Night Too Long"	Columbia	2650-D		
1932	"Moonlight on the River" / "Something in the Night"	Columbia	2705-D		
1933	"In the Little White Church on the Hill" / "The Rest of the World is Sleeping"	Bluebird	B-5044		
1933	"Pettin' in the Park" / "I've Got to Sing a Torch Song"	Bluebird	B-5052		
1938	"When I Lost You" / "Shadows on the Wall"	Decca	1919		
1938	"Careless Love" / "Sing Me a Song Of Texas"	Decca	63364		

=== 1950s ===
Year	Title (A-side / b-side)	Label	Cat. #	Notes	Ref.
1950	"Don't Even Change a Picture on a Wall" / "Longing"	Decca	27163	With the Blue Grass Boys	
1950	"Lonesome Darlin'" / "If Only You Knew"	Decca	27066	With the Blue Grass Boys	

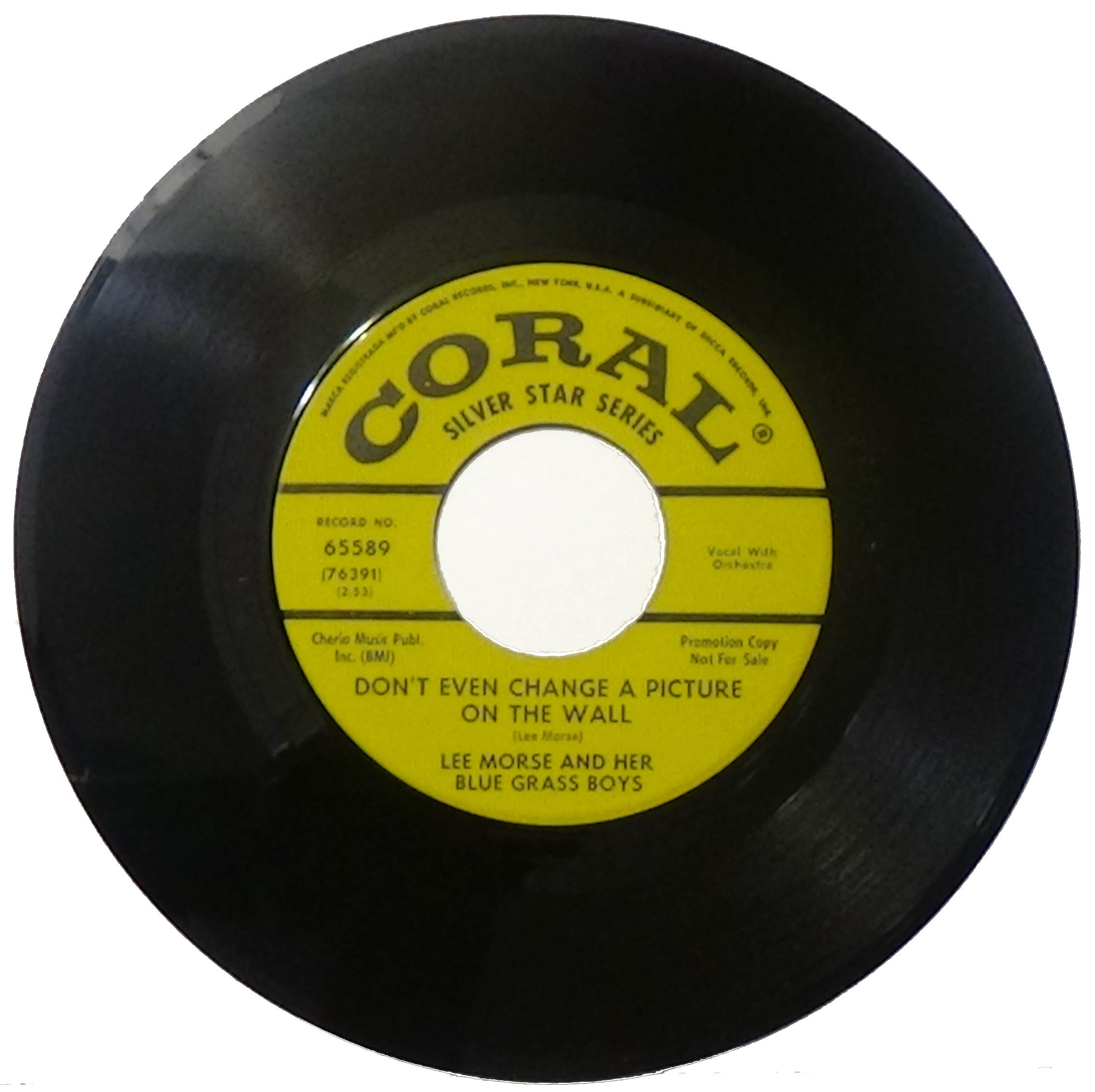
"Don't Even Change A Picture On The Wall"

== Compilation albums ==
Year	Title	Label	Notes	Ref.
1982	Lee Morse Revisited	Take Two	LP record	
1990	Lee Morse (1925 - 1938): I'm a Real Kind Mama	Harlequin	CD	
1998	A Musical Portrait	Take Two	2-CD set	
2005	Echoes of a Songbird: 50 Recordings from 1924-1930	Jasmine	2-CD set	
2016	Sweeping the Cobwebs	Asherah Records	LP record	
2020	Anthology: The Deluxe Collection	Master Tape Records	MP3 album	

== Sources ==
- Laird, Ross (1996). Moanin' Low: A Discography of Female Popular Vocal Recordings, 1920-1933. Westport, Connecticut: Greenwood Press. ISBN 978-0-313-29241-5.
