= Taxi dancer =

Paid dance partner in a partner dance

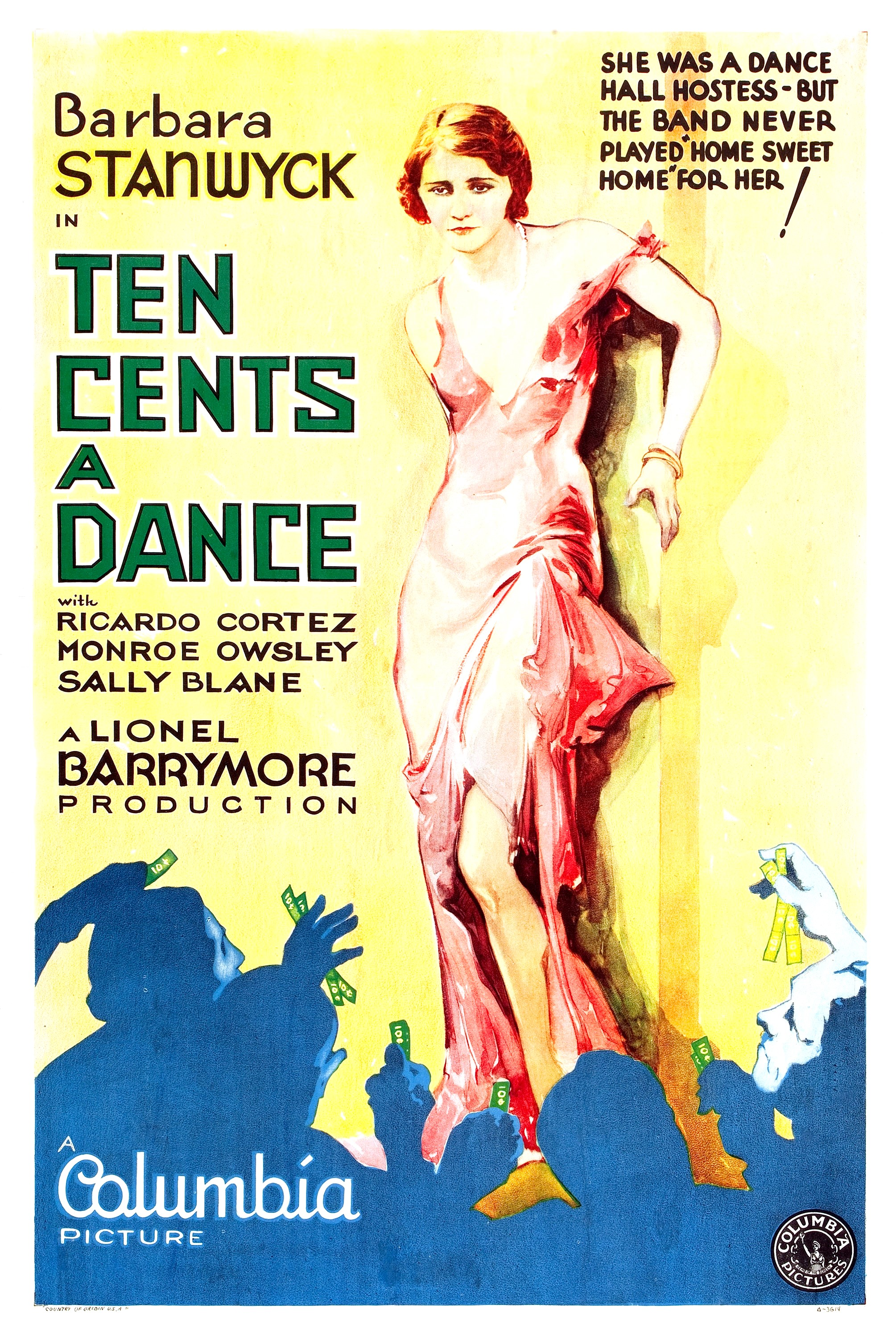
Poster for the film Ten Cents a Dance (1931) with Barbara Stanwyck as a taxi dancer

A taxi dancer is a paid dance partner in a ballroom dance. Taxi dancers work (sometimes for money but not always) on a dance-by-dance basis. When taxi dancing first appeared in taxi-dance halls during the early 20th century in the United States, male patrons typically bought dance tickets for a small sum each. When a patron presented a ticket to a chosen taxi dancer, she danced with him for the length of a song. She earned a commission on every dance ticket she received. Though taxi dancing has for the most part disappeared in the United States, it is still practiced in some other countries.

== Etymology ==
The term "taxi dancer" comes from the fact that, as with a taxi-cab driver, the dancer's pay is proportional to the time they spend dancing with the customer. Patrons in a taxi-dance hall typically purchased dance tickets for ten cents each, which gave rise to the term "dime-a-dance girl". Other names for a taxi dancer are "dance hostess" and "taxi" (in Argentina). In the 1920s and '30s, the term "nickel hopper" gained popularity in the United States because out of each dime-a-dance, the taxi dancer typically earned five cents.

== History ==
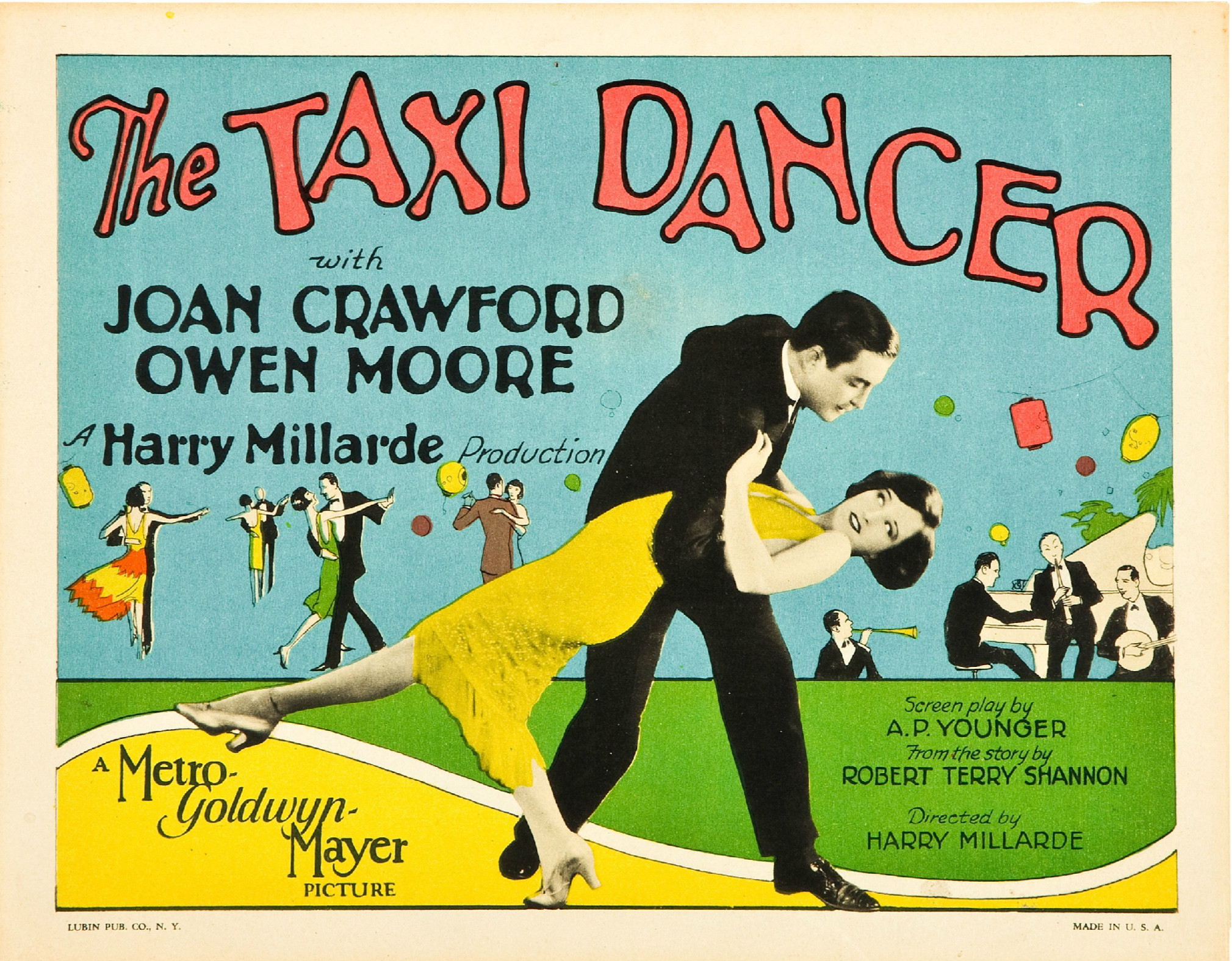
Lobby card for The Taxi Dancer (1927)

Taxi dancing traces its origins to the Barbary Coast district of San Francisco which evolved from the California Gold Rush of 1849. In its heyday the Barbary Coast was an economically thriving district, inhabited mostly by men, that was frequented by gold prospectors and sailors from all over the world. That district created a unique form of dance hall called the Barbary Coast dance hall, also known as the Forty-Nine ['49] dance hall. Within a Barbary Coast dance hall female employees danced with male patrons, and earned their living from commissions paid for by the drinks they could encourage their male dance partners to buy.

Still later after the San Francisco Earthquake of 1906 and during early days of jazz music, a new entertainment district developed in San Francisco and was nicknamed Terrific Street. And within that district an innovative dance hall, The So Different Club, implemented a system in which customers could buy a token which entitled them to one dance with a female employee. Since dancing had become a popular pastime, many of the So Different Club's patrons went there to see and learn the latest new dances.

In 1913, San Francisco enacted a law against dancing in any café or saloon where alcohol was served. The closure of the dance halls on Terrific Street fostered a new kind of pay-to-dance scheme, called a closed dance hall, which did not serve alcohol. The name was derived from the fact that female customers were not allowed; the only women permitted in these venues were female employees. The closed dance hall introduced the ticket-a-dance system, which became the centerpiece of the taxi-dance-hall business model. A taxi dancer earned her income from the tickets she received for dances.

Taxi dancing then spread to Chicago, where dance academies, which were struggling to survive, began to adopt the ticket-a-dance system for their students. The first instance of the ticket-a-dance system in Chicago occurred at Mader-Johnson Dance Studios. The dance studio's owner, Godfrey Johnson, describes his innovation:

I was in New York during the summer of 1919, and while there visited a new studio opened by Mr. W___ W___ of San Francisco, where he had introduced a ten-cent-ticket-a-dance plan. When I got home I kept thinking of that plan as a way to get my advanced students to come back more often and to have experience dancing with different instructors. So I decided to put a ten-cent-a-lesson system in the big hall on the third floor of my building ... But I soon noticed that it wasn't my former pupils who were coming up to dance, but a rough hoodlum element from Clark Street ... Things went from bad to worse; I did the best I could to keep the hoodlums in check.

This system was so popular at dance academies that the taxi-dance system quickly spread to an increasing number of non-instructional dance halls.

Taxi dancers typically received half of the ticket price as wages and the other half paid for the orchestra, dance hall, and operating expenses. Although they worked only a few hours a night, they frequently made two to three times the salary of a woman working in a factory or a store. At that time, the taxi-dance hall surpassed the public ballroom in becoming the most popular place for urban dancing.

Taxi-dancing flourished in the United States during the 1920s and 1930s, as scores of taxi-dance halls opened in Chicago, New York, and other major cities. Like other nightlife venues, the taxi-dance hall ran the gamut from the classy establishment to the cramped and seedy hole-in-the-wall. Roseland in New York City, for example, which offered taxi dancing in the late 1930s, appealed to the more discerning patron. Far more common were halls catering to a working-class clientele. By the mid-1920s taxi dancing had become a nightlife entertainment staple in many large American cities. Reflecting this popularity, the entertainment industry got into the act, releasing the crowd-pleasing song "Ten Cents a Dance" (1930) and the movies The Taxi Dancer (1927), with star Joan Crawford, and Ten Cents a Dance (1931), featuring Barbara Stanwyck. Also in Lady of the Night (1925) taxi-dancing is the profession of one of the dual roles played by Norma Shearer, with Joan Crawford as body double. In 1931, there were over 100 taxi-dance halls in New York City alone, patronized by between 35,000 and 50,000 men every week.

At the same time taxi dancing was growing in popularity, the activity was coming under the increasing scrutiny of moral reformers in New York City and elsewhere, who deemed some dance halls dens of iniquity. Most establishments were properly run, respectable venues, but a handful were less so. In the less reputable halls, it was not uncommon to find charity girls engaged in treating working as dancers. Although treating activity did occur in a good number of halls, and even in some of the more respectable places, it rarely crossed into prostitution. The taxi dancers who engaged in treating, or the receipt of "presents," typically drew sharp distinctions between the activity and that of prostitution, but they often walked a fine line between the two. Periodically, licentious "close" dancing also was happening (see taxi dancer experience below) in some of the shady halls. Considered scandalous and obscene by many reformers, this kind of dancing was another concern to the authorities. Before long taxi-dance hall reform gained momentum, leading to licensing systems and more police supervision, and eventually some dance halls were closed for lewd behavior. In San Francisco, where it all started, the police commission ruled against the employment of women as taxi dancers in 1921, and thereafter taxi dancing in San Francisco forever became illegal.

After World War II the popularity of taxi dancing in the United States began to diminish. By the mid-1950s large numbers of taxi-dance halls had disappeared, and although a handful of establishments tried to hold on for a few more years in New York City and elsewhere, taxi dancing had all but vanished from the nightlife scene in the U.S. by the 1960s.

== Experience ==
In the 1920s and '30s, taxi-dancer work was seen by many as a questionable occupation, somewhat on the margins of proper society. Even though most taxi dance halls were respectable venues, staffed with ordinary young women just working to make a proper living, some establishments were more suspect. The less reputable halls tended to draw a rougher, lower-class clientele, as well as the ire of reformers, and the image of the taxi dancing profession as a whole suffered. Often the young women who took up taxi dancing determined not to tell their parents and neighbors about their employment, or just outright lied if queried.

The dance halls, which were often sparsely decorated and dimly lit, were usually located on the second floors of buildings in the nightlife areas of cities. Several taxi-dance halls, for instance, were located in New York City's Times Square. A barker was normally stationed outside the venue, and patrons typically had to climb stairs to enter the establishment. Before admittance patrons had to buy a ticket or a set of dance tickets. Usually they were not allowed in free to survey the scene.

In the hall, the taxi dancers were usually gathered together behind a waist-high rope or rail barricade on one side or corner of the room, and, as such, were not permitted to freely mingle with patrons. Because the male patron selected his dancing partner, the dancers had to appeal to him from their quarantined position. This produced a competitive situation, and on slow nights, which were not uncommon, the taxi dancers often cooed and coaxed to draw attention in their direction. In time, and with more experience, a dancer usually developed some sort of distinctiveness or mannerism, in dress or personality, to attract the male patron. Those who did not were often not successful. Once selected, the taxi dancer tried to build a rapport with her partner so he stayed with her, dance after dance. Successful taxi dancers usually had a few patrons who came to a hall solely to dance with them, and for long periods. In some of the less reputable establishments the dancing at times was particularly close; the dancer used her thighs to make her partner erect, and if encouraged to continue, ejaculate.

Patrons who tired of dancing but wished to continue talking with a taxi dancer usually could do so. A section in the dance hall with tables and chairs was reserved for this purpose. It was called "talk time," although other terms were used. In 1939, at the Honeymoon Lane Danceland in Times Square, the fee to sit and chat with a dancer was six dollars an hour, a princely sum for the time. At Honeymoon, although the dancer and patron were able to sit side by side, a low fence-like structure separated them due to police regulations. It was not uncommon for taxi dancers to date patrons they had met in the dance halls, and this was generally acquiesced to by management.

It was at Wilson's Dancing Academy in Times Square in 1923, where author Henry Miller first encountered Juliet "June" Smerdt, who became his second wife in 1924. She was working as a taxi dancer. Using either the alias June Mansfield or June Smith, she had started at Wilson's as a dance instructor in 1917, aged 15. (Wilson's was renamed the Orpheum Dance Palace in 1931.)

== Background ==
Generally, what is known today about the life and lives of the taxi dancer of the 1920s and 1930s comes from a major sociological study published by the University of Chicago Press in 1932 (see 'Classic sociological study' section below). According to the study, the typical taxi dancer of the period was an attractive young woman between the ages of 15 and 28 who was usually single. Although some dancers were undoubtedly older, the taxi-dancer profession tended to skew strongly toward the young and single. A majority of the young women came from homes in which there was little or no financial support from a father or father figure. The dancers were occasionally runaways from their families, and it was not unusual for a young woman to be from a home where the parents had separated. Despite their relatively young age range, a sizable percentage of taxi dancers had been previously married.

Often the dancers were immigrants from European countries, such as Poland, Sweden, the Netherlands, Germany, and France. Due to cultural differences, conflicts often arose between parents and their dancing offspring, especially if the parents were originally from rural areas. Sometimes a young woman of an immigrant family who worked as a taxi dancer was the primary financial support of the family. When this occurred and the young woman supplanted the parent or parents as breadwinner, sometimes she assumed an aggressive role in the family by "subordinating the parental standards to her own requirements and demands."

These conflicts in values between young women taxi dancers and their parents frequently caused the young women to lead so-called "double lives", denying that they worked at a taxi-dance hall. To further this divide, the young women sometimes adopted aliases so news of their activities might not reach their families' ears. When parents found out, there were three typical outcomes: the young woman either gave up her dancing career, left home estranged from the family or was encouraged to continue.

Despite the frequent hardships, many taxi dancers seemed to enjoy the lifestyle and its enticements of "money, excitement, and affection". Most young women interviewed for the study spoke favorably about their experiences in the taxi-dance hall.

One dancer [case #15] from the 1920s describes her start at a taxi-dance hall:

I was working as a waitress in a Loop restaurant for about a month. I never worked in a dance hall like this and didn't know about them. One day the "boss" of this hall was eating in the restaurant and told me I could make twice as much money in his "dancing school." I went there one night to try it – and then quit my job at the restaurant. I always liked to dance anyway, so it was really fun.

A dancer from Chicago [case #11] spoke positively of her experiences:

After I had gotten started at the dance hall I enjoyed the life too much to want to give it up. It was easy work, gave me more money than I could earn any other way, and I had a chance to meet all kinds of people. I had no dull moments. I met bootleggers, rum-runners, hijackers, stick-up men, globe-trotters, and hobos. There were all different kinds of men, different from the kind I'd be meeting if I'd stayed at home with my folks in Rogers Park ... After a girl starts in the dance hall and makes good it's easy to live for months without ever getting outside the influence of the dance hall. Take myself for instance: I lived with other dance-hall girls, met my fellows at the dance hall, got my living in the dance hall. In fact, there was nothing I wanted that I couldn't get through it. It was an easy life, and I just drifted along with the rest. I suppose if something hadn't come along to jerk me out, I'd still be a drifter out on the West Side.

== Classic sociological study ==
In 1932, the University of Chicago Press published The Taxi-Dance Hall: A Sociological Study in Commercialized Recreation and City Life by researcher Paul G. Cressey. In its examination of Chicago's taxi-dancing milieu of the 1920s and early '30s, the book, utilizing vivid, firsthand interviews of taxi dancers as well as their patrons, brought to light the little-known world of the taxi dance hall. The study is now considered one of the classic urban ethnographies of the Chicago School.

=== Vocabulary ===
As taxi dancing evolved to become a staple in the American nightlife of the 1920s and 1930s, taxi dancers developed an argot of their own. In his 1932 sociological study, Cressey took note of the specialized vocabulary in the Chicago dance halls:

- black and tan – a colored and white cabaret
- buying the groceries – living in a clandestine relationship
- class – term used by Filipinos to denote the taxi-dance halls
- fish – a man whom the girls can easily exploit for personal gain
- fruit – an easy mark
- hot stuff – stolen goods
- line-up, the– immorality engaged in by several men and a girl
- make – to secure a date with
- mark – a person who is gullible and easily taken advantage of
- monkey-chaser – a man interested in a taxi dancer or chorus girl
- monkey shows – burlesque shows with chorus girls
- nickel-hopper – a taxi dancer
- on the ebony – a taxi-dance hall or taxi dancer having social contacts with men of races other than white
- opera – burlesque show
- paying the rent – living in a clandestine relationship
- picking up – securing an after-dance engagement with a taxi dancer
- playing – successfully exploiting one of the opposite sex
- professional – a government investigator; one visiting the taxi-dance hall for ulterior purposes
- punk – a novitiate; an uninitiated youth or young girl, usually referring to an unsophisticated taxi dancer
- racket – a special enterprise to earn money, honestly or otherwise
- shakedown – enforced exaction of graft

== Present day ==
Although the ticket-per-dance system of taxi dancing has become nearly nonexistent in the United States and around the world, some nightclubs and dance instruction establishments continue to offer dancers who may be hired as dance partners. Most often these dance partners are female, but sometimes male. Instead of being called taxi dancers, the dancers are today usually referred to as "dance hostesses". Dance hostesses are often employed to assist beginners to learn to dance or may be utilized to further the general goal of building the dance community of an establishment.

In social settings and social forms of dance, the hostess is unlikely to criticize directly. A partner wanting constructive feedback from a dance hostess must explicitly request it.

Due to the increased profile of partner dances during the 2000s, hostessing has become more common in settings where partners are in short supply, for either male or female dancers. For example, male dancers are often employed on cruise ships to dance with single female passengers. This system is usually referred to as the Dance Host program. Dance hostesses (male and female) are also available for hire in Vienna, Austria, where dozens of formal balls are held each year.

Volunteer dance hostesses (experienced male and female dancers) are often used in dance styles such as Ceroc to help beginners.

=== United States ===
There remain a handful of nightclubs in the United States, particularly in the cities of New York and Los Angeles, where an individual can pay to dance with a female dance hostess. Usually these modern clubs forgo the use of the ticket-a-dance system, and instead have time-clocks and punch-cards that allow a patron to pay for the dancer's time by the hour. Some of these dance clubs operate in buildings where taxi dancing was done in the early 20th century. No longer called taxi-dance halls, these latter-day establishments are now called hostess clubs.

=== Argentina ===
The growth of tango tourism in Buenos Aires, Argentina, has led to an increase in formal and informal dance hostess services in the milongas, or dance halls. While some operators attempt to sell holiday romance, reputable tango agencies offer genuine host services to tourists who find it hard to cope with the cabeceo—the eye contact and nodding-method of finding a dance partner.

=== Mexico ===
In Mexico, taxi dancers are called "ficheras," women working at, for the most part, a bar or dance club that acts as a waitress when one orders a drink or, companion when one buys her a drink at 3 times the cost. The fichera receives a cut from these sales from the establishment.

== In popular culture ==
Since the 1920s when taxi dancing boomed in popularity, various films, songs and novels have been released reflecting the pastime, often using the taxi-dance hall as a setting or chronicling the lives of taxi dancers.

Films

- Dance Hall (1929), pre-Code musical based on a Viña Delmar short story.
- The Nickel-Hopper (1926), silent short.
- In the 1932 Warner Bros. film Two Seconds, Edward G. Robinson meets a taxi dancer (Vivienne Osborne), who he marries when drunk, and later kills out of jealousy.
- Ten Cents a Dance (1931), starring Barbara Stanwyck; inspired by the popular song of the same name.
- Let's Dance (1933), short featuring George Burns as a sailor and Gracie Allen as a dance hostess at Roseland Dance Hall.
- Follow the Fleet (1936), starring Fred Astaire and Ginger Rogers. Rogers's character sings in a taxi-dance hall at the beginning.
- The Taxi Dancer (1927), starring Joan Crawford and Owen Moore.
- Asleep in the Feet (1933), Hal Roach comedy short starring Thelma Todd and ZaSu Pitts.
- Dime-A-Dance (1937), featuring Al Christie and Imogene Coca.
- Child of Manhattan (1937), based on a play by Preston Sturges.
- Deadline at Dawn (1946), about a New York dime-a-dance girl helping to clear a sailor framed for murder.
- In Lured (1947), Lucille Ball stars as a New York taxi dancer in London who works undercover to solve a string of murders.
- In Tomorrow Is Another Day (1951), Steve Cochran stars in a film noir as a released murderer who falls hard for Ruth Roman's taxi dancer, Cathy Higgins.
- Love Me or Leave Me (1955), the fictionalized MGM biopic of singer Ruth Etting, opens in a taxi-dance hall where Ruth (played by Doris Day) works. She also sings her signature song "Ten Cents a Dance" later in the film.
- In Killer's Kiss (1955), a film by Stanley Kubrick, various scenes take place in a taxi-dance hall.
- In The Rat Race (1960), Debbie Reynolds stars as a struggling taxi dancer; based on a play by Garson Kanin.
- Sweet Charity (1969), musical comedy starring Shirley MacLaine; directed and choreographed by Bob Fosse.
- In Heavy Traffic (1973), the protagonist imagines his girlfriend and his mother working as taxi dancers at a dance hall. When the scene ends the dance hall is revealed to be an abandoned ruin.
- In A League of Their Own (1992), the character played by Madonna, "All the Way" Mae Mordabito, mentions that if the league folds, she won't go back to taxi dancing and have guys sweat gin on her for ten cents a dance.
- In The Quiet American (2002), starring Michael Caine and Brendan Fraser, various scenes take place in a taxi-dance hall during Indochina War-era Saigon .
- The White Countess (2005), directed by James Ivory, tells the story of a Russian countess (Natasha Richardson) who works as a taxi dancer in Shanghai in the 1930s to support her family of White émigrés.

Books

- The Taxi Dancer by Robert Terry Shannon (1931).
- The Confessions of a Taxi Dancer by Anonymous (booklet, 1938).
- The Adventures of Sally by P. G. Wodehouse (1939).
- Crosstown by John Held, Jr. (1951), "Showgirl Mazie's rise from Taxi-Dancer to Broadway star".
- Taxi Dancers by Eve Linkletter (1959) (adult paperback).
- Ten Cents a Dance by Christine Fletcher (2010).
- The Bartender's Tale by Ivan Doig (2012), features a character who was formerly a taxi dancer.
- A Girl Like You: A Henrietta and Inspector Howard Novel by Michelle Cox (2016).
- The Night Tiger by Yangsze Choo (2019) - main character Ji Lin works as a dance hall hostess in 1930s British Malaya.

Songs and music videos

- "Ten Cents a Dance" (1930), music by Richard Rodgers, lyrics by Lorenz Hart.
- "Taxi War Dance" (1939), jazz instrumental by Count Basie featuring Lester Young.
- "Big Spender" (1966), from the musical Sweet Charity with music by Cy Coleman and lyrics by Dorothy Fields, is sung from the point of view of the dance hostesses.
- "Dime a Dance" (1972), recorded by Vicki Lawrence; the flip-side of "The Night the Lights Went Out in Georgia", from the album of the same name.
- "Aja" (1977), music and lyrics by Steely Dan (refers to "dime dancing") .
- "Taxi Dancer" (1979), music and lyrics by John Mellencamp.
- The music video for the 1983 Pat Benatar song "Love Is a Battlefield" follows the experience of a young woman who runs away from home and becomes a taxi dancer.
- "Taxi Dancing" (1984), "Hard to Hold" movie soundtrack, by Rick Springfield, featuring Randy Crawford.
- "Taxi Dancer" (2013) by the band Dengue Fever.
- "Private Dancer" (1983), music and lyrics by Mark Knopfler, recorded by Tina Turner on the album of the same name.
- "Eggs and Sausage (In a Cadillac with Susan Michelson)" (1975) by Tom Waits contains the lyric "dime for a dance".

Musical theatre

- Simple Simon (1930), music by Richard Rodgers, lyrics by Lorenz Hart, book by Guy Bolton; the song "Ten Cents a Dance" was introduced in this show, sung by Ruth Etting.
- Sweet Charity (1966), music by Cy Coleman, lyrics by Dorothy Fields and book by Neil Simon.

Television

- In Big Sky, the character Ronald reveals he is a taxi dancer.
- In Cold Case, the murder victim in "World's End" (Season 5, Episode 7) was a taxi dancer in 1938 Philadelphia during the Great Depression.
- L.A. Law features an episode (Season 5, Episode 7) in which two of the characters (Benny and Murray) visit a taxi dance hall in Los Angeles during 1990.
- Laverne & Shirley has an episode ("Call Me a Taxi", 1977) in which the two are laid off and take jobs as taxi dancers.
- Psych season 6 episode "Autopsy Turvy" features a taxi dance hall and dancers who provide clues regarding a murder.
- In The Waltons episode "The Achievement" (Season 5, Episode 25), John-Boy travels to New York to check on his book manuscript and finds his friend Daisy working as a taxi dancer.

== See also ==
- Ballroom dance
- Lap dance
