= Lee Morse =

American singer-songwriter

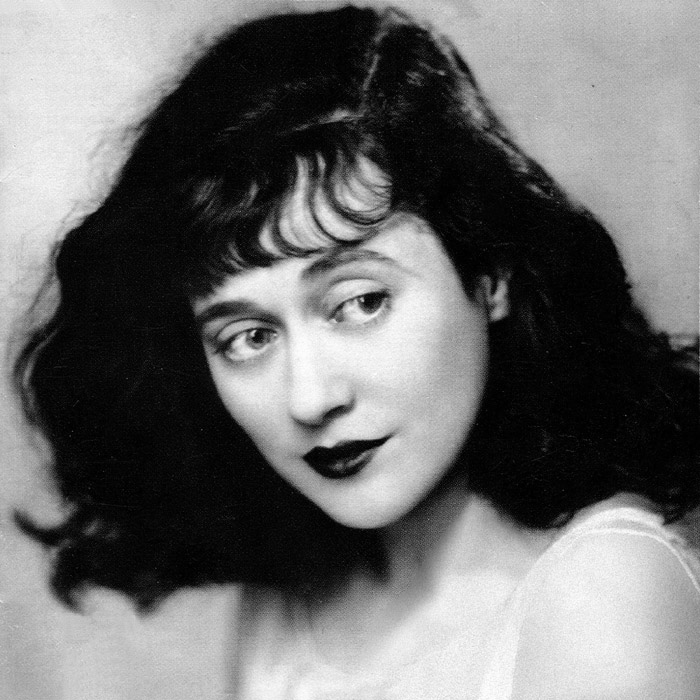
- Morse circa 1930
- Born: Lena Corinne Taylor; November 30, 1897; Cove, Oregon, U.S.
- Died: December 16, 1954 (aged 57); Rochester, New York, U.S.
- Resting place: Riverside Cemetery, Rochester, New York, U.S.
- Occupations: Singer; musician; actress
- Spouses: Elmer Morse (m. 1915–1925) Ray Farese (m. 1946)
- Relatives: Glen Taylor (brother)
- Musical career
- Genres: Jazz; blues
- Instruments: Vocals; guitar; piano
- Years active: 1917–1954
- Labels: Pathé; Perfect; Columbia; Decca; Coral

Lena Corinne "Lee" Morse (née Taylor; November 30, 1897 – December 16, 1954) was an American jazz and blues singer-songwriter, composer, guitarist, and actress. Morse's greatest popularity was in the 1920s and early 1930s as a torch singer, although her career began around 1917 and continued until her death in 1954.

Morse was known for her strong, deep singing voice and vocal range, which often belied her petite frame. She possessed a contralto vocal range, and one of her trademarks was her unique style of yodeling. Recording over 200 songs over her career, Morse was one of the most recorded female singers of the 1920s. She was also moderately successful as an actress on the Broadway stage. Her life and career, however, were marred by alcoholism. Morse's group the Blue Grass Boys had no relation either Bill Monroe's later band of the same name nor to the bluegrass genre.

In 2014, Morse's rendition of "If You Want the Rainbow" was used in an episode of the HBO series Boardwalk Empire.

== Early life ==
Morse was born Lena Corinne Taylor on November 30, 1897, in Cove, Oregon, a small town in the Grande Ronde Valley. Some sources list Morse's birthplace as Portland, Oregon, though this is disputed by her death certificate, which lists her birthplace as Union County, Oregon. She was the ninth of twelve children (and the third daughter) of Pleasant John Taylor, a local pastor from Texas, and his wife Olive Higgins Fleming. Morse's younger brother was Glen H. Taylor, a country singer and Democratic politician who served in the United States Senate from Idaho, and also ran for the Vice-President of the United States with Henry Wallace. Morse's other siblings included six other brothers: Robert, Davis, Jackson, Ephraim, Ruford, and Paul; two half-sisters, Elinor and Carrie; and two half-brothers, Lemuel and Pleasant.

The Taylor family was musical and prior to Lena's birth had toured Idaho by covered wagon as the Taylor Family Concert Company, affording them enough money to purchase a ranch in La Grande, Oregon. After their ranch was foreclosed on, the family relocated to the small town of Kooskia, Idaho, where Lena spent her early years. She had learned to sing by the time she was three years old by impersonating her brothers, which accounts for her later ability to master deeper registers in her vocal range.

In 1908 the Taylors moved to Clearwater Valley, three miles east of Kooskia. The family had little money, and father John Taylor spent time as a traveling preacher in Colorado and across Oregon. Lena Taylor would often be heard singing on her way to school. On May 2, 1915, Lena married Elmer Morse, a local woodworker from Wallace, Idaho. She gave birth to a son, Jack, in 1916. Lena, however, had a desire for a career as a singer and separated from Morse in 1920.

== Career ==
=== Early work ===
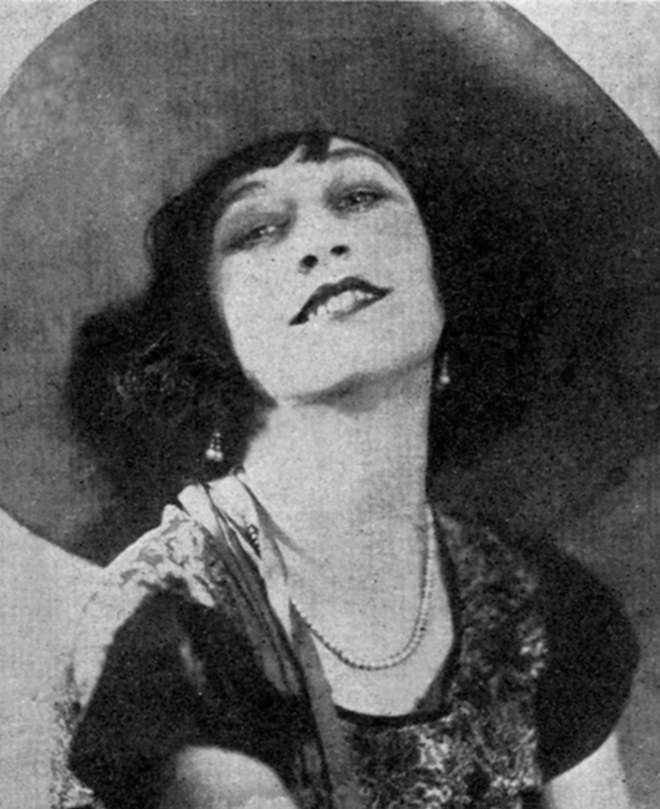
Morse in an early publicity headshot

Her first professional notice came around 1918, when she performed under the name "Mrs. Elmer Morse" at a local silent movie house. During the next few years she played shows largely in small Pacific Northwestern towns such as Spokane, Washington, and Chewelah, accompanying herself on guitar.

Lee Morse's family was involved in politics as well as music. In 1920 her father was elected as a delegate to the Democratic National Convention. Morse accompanied her father to San Francisco and, while there, performed in a convention at the Hotel St. Francis. As a result, she was noticed by Will King, a famous vaudeville producer of the day, who subsequently signed her to a contract.

Morse seized the opportunity for a career in the vaudeville of the West Coast. She left Kooskia—and her husband Elmer—behind for good. Her brother Glen later observed, "she left home when we were barefoot and had the best suite in a Portland hotel when I saw her again."

In 1921, Morse began working in musical revues under Kolb and Dill. In 1922, she joined the Pantages circuit with a 15-minute act titled Do You Remember One Small Girl a Whole Quartet. One reviewer observed "she sings a baritone 'Silver Moon,' then swings into a bass with 'Asleep in the Deep' and finishes in a soprano with 'Just a Song of Twilight.'" In November 1922 the reviewer for Variety noted "She gives the impression of a male impersonator, yodels rather sweetly, sings the 'blues' number better than the majority."

In 1923, Morse won a role in the touring version of the revue Hitchy Koo. The cast included star Raymond Hitchcock, as well as Marion Green, Irene Delroy, Al Sexton, Busby Berkeley, and Ruth Urban. She next performed in the Shubert revue Artists and Models, which opened on Broadway on August 20, 1923.

=== Music, stage, and film ===
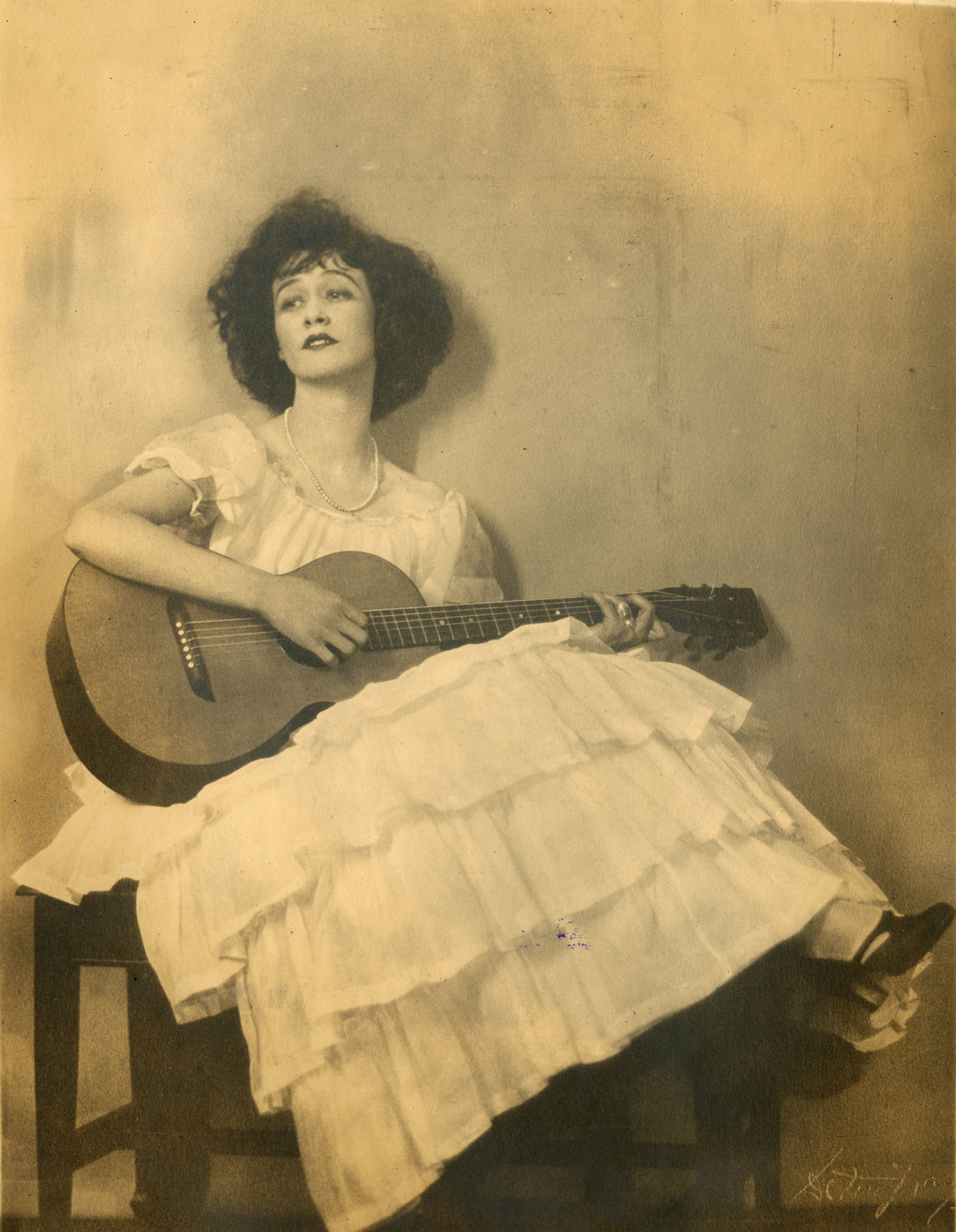
Morse c. 1929

In 1924, Morse began her recording career with a contract with the Pathé label. Due to her deep voice, her Pathé and Perfect records were billed as "Miss Lee Morse". During this era of acoustic recording, the power of her voice was essential to the success of her recordings. Also during this time, she was given the opportunity to record many of her own compositions, such as "Golden Dream Girl". Among her notable recordings from this period are "Telling Eyes," "Those Daisy Days," "An Old-Fashioned Romance" (which she re-recorded for Columbia in 1927), "Blue Waltz", "The Shadows on the Wall," "Deep Wide Ocean Blues," "A Little Love," and "Daddy's Girl."

Pathé gave Morse the opportunity to indulge in a level of experimentation, not only by recording her own songs, but also through the opportunity to explore the limits of her vocal abilities. Prevalent on these early recordings are her characteristic whoops, yips, and yodels. Although dismissed by some as a gimmick, these techniques added a personality to her voice and enabled her to demonstrate her multi-octave range.

Morse's success as an entertainer took its toll on her personal life. Her husband, Elmer Morse, had created a home for her complete with furnishings he'd built himself. On February 18, 1925, he filed for divorce on the grounds of desertion and abandonment. Although she had deserted her husband and child five years earlier, Morse was able to keep custody of their son Jack. (Note: Little has been written about Morse's relationship with her son. It was apparently no secret that they did not have the close relationship that both would have liked; some have commented that Morse related to her son more as a peer than as a son, and he spent many of his early years away at boarding school. He was last known to be living in California, and is now deceased.- www.leemorse.com) In October 1926, Elmer Morse died of scarlet fever in Spokane, Washington, aged 35.

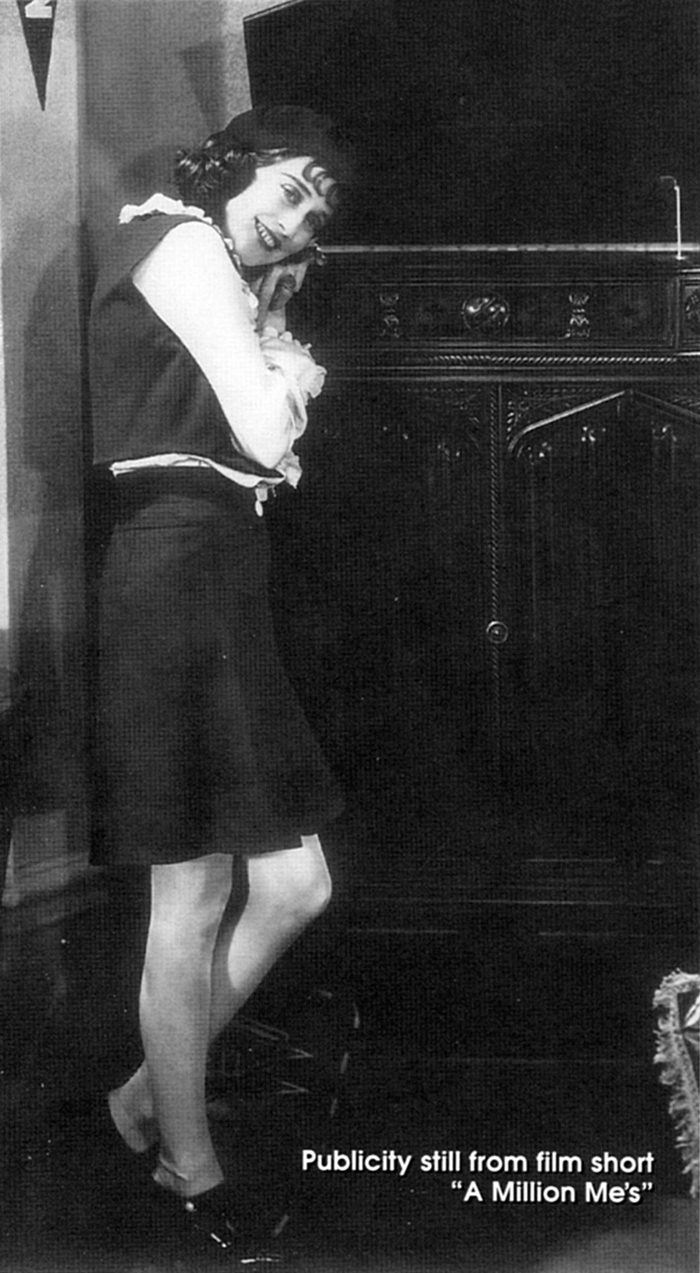
Morse in A Million Me's, the first of three one-reel films she made in 1930

In 1927, with other prominent Pathé and Perfect vocalists (Willard Robison, Annette Hanshaw, Cliff Edwards), Morse moved to the Columbia label. From 1927 to 1932, she was one of the label's most popular female performers, second only to Ruth Etting. She continued to do vaudeville and other stage work, landing a role in Ziegfeld's Simple Simon that may have made her an even bigger star. But her drinking problem left her unable to perform on the show's February 18, 1930, debut. According to Lorenz Hart biographer Gary Marmorstein: "[On opening night], Wynn, the bicycle-piano and Lee Morse made their entrance and were greeted with applause. Everything would have been fine except that Miss Morse had had a few too many and couldn't remember the words or the music." Minus their star, the producers asked Ruth Etting to substitute. As a result, the show's "Ten Cents a Dance" became Etting's signature song while Morse's once promising Broadway career abruptly ended.

In the mid-1920s, Morse met pianist Bob Downey. He became her accompanist on stage and companion in life, and the two booked international shows together, including a tour of the United Kingdom that concluded with a show at the Piccadilly Theatre in London, England. They lived together as a couple, although whether or not they were married remains questionable. She and Downey opened a small club in Texas that burned down in 1939. They moved to Rochester, New York. Downey left Morse for a striptease dancer. This end to their relationship left Morse devastated and more dependent upon alcohol.

Although Morse's Broadway prospects had dimmed by the 1930s, she could still be seen in a number of musical film shorts, including A Million Me's (Paramount, April 25, 1930), The Music Racket (Vitaphone, June 30, 1930), and Song Service (Paramount, October 24, 1930). By 1929, she had returned to Portland, where she performed at the Pantages Theatre.

She had always preferred stage audiences to small clubs, once commenting "I get nervous! I can't stand it! I want to scream!" Her stage fright was ostensibly linked to her drinking problem that developed during her career. However, as the business changed in the 1930s, she found herself taking club dates when stage gigs grew scarce.

On March 20, 1931, the Van Heusen program debuted on CBS Radio with Morse as its star. Other programs on which she appeared included The Majestic Theater of the Air.

=== Later career ===
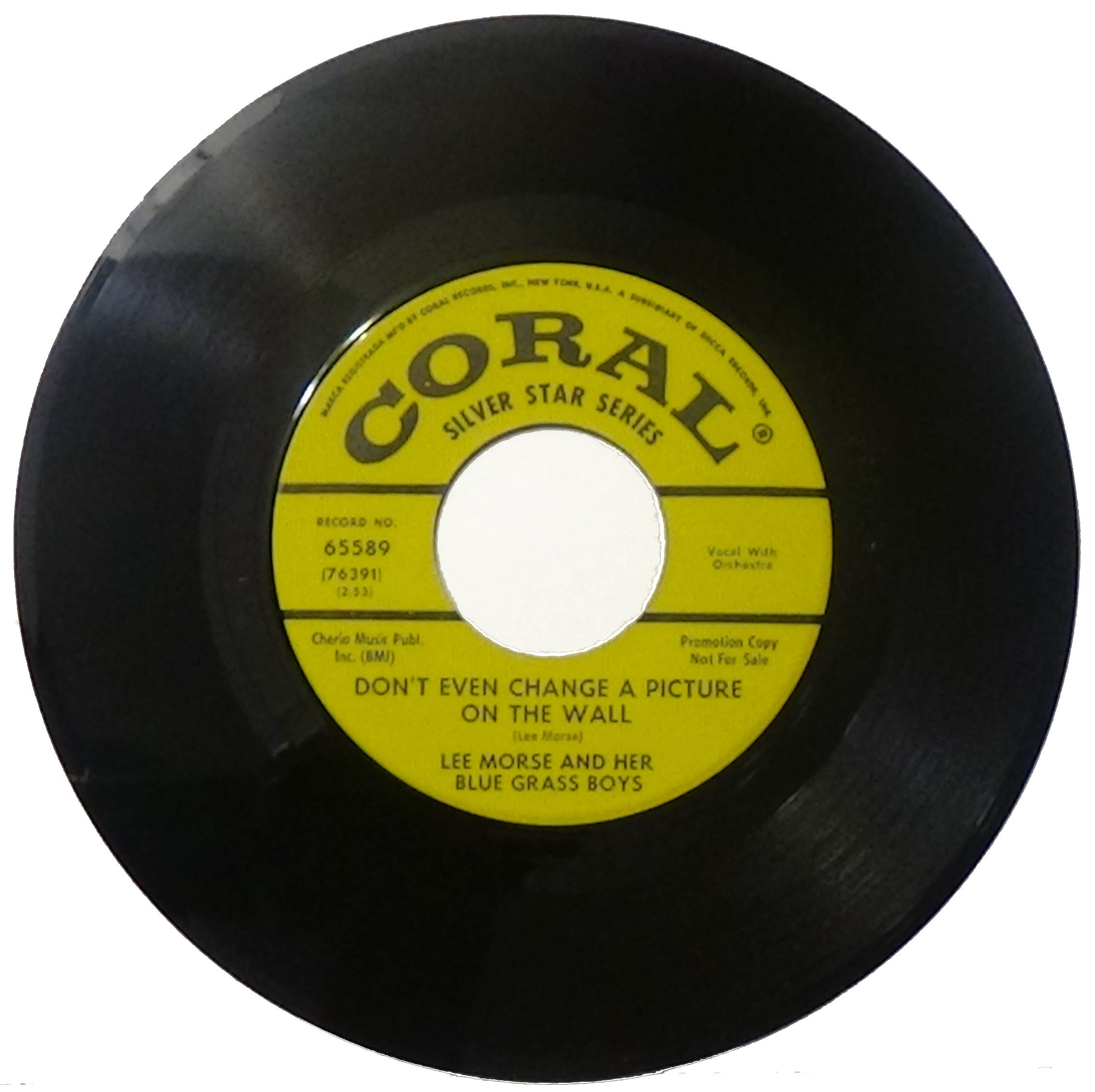
Morse's final record, "Don't Even Change A Picture On The Wall".

After her relationship with Bob Downey ended in the late 1930s, Morse weathered a rocky period that left those closest to her worried for her health. In April 1930 she had an affliction in her throat while in Indianapolis. Life improved when she met Ray Farese, whom she married in 1946. Farese helped her revitalize her career by getting her a radio show in Rochester and securing local club dates. She attempted a comeback with the song "Don't Even Change a Picture on the Wall" that was written in the 1940s for World War II soldiers and recorded in 1950. Although the song enjoyed local success, it failed to return her to past success.

== Death ==
Morse died on December 16, 1954, in Rochester while visiting a neighbor. She was 57 years old. She is interred at the Riverside Cemetery.

After her death, her husband, Ray Farese, turned her photos and scrapbook over to journalist Howard Hosmer, who apparently produced a career retrospective for a local station. Farese died before Hosmer could return Lee's mementos. Hosmer died in 1986.

== Filmography ==
| Year | Title | Studio | Notes | Ref. |
|---|---|---|---|---|
| 1930 | A Million Me's | Paramount | Short film | |
| 1930 | The Music Racket | Warner Bros. | Short film | |
| 1930 | Song Service | Paramount | Short film | |

== Stage credits ==
| Year | Title | Role | Location | Notes | Ref. |
|---|---|---|---|---|---|
| 1922 | Hitchy-Koo | Performer | National tour | | |
| 1923 | Artists and Models | Performer | Winter Garden Theater (Broadway) | | |
| 1930 | Simple Simon | Sal | Ziegfeld Theatre (Broadway) | Dropped out of production | |

== Sources ==
- Cullen, Frank (2006). Vaudeville, Old and New: An Encyclopedia of Variety Performers in America. New York: Routledge. ISBN 978-0-415-93853-2.
- Marmorstein, Gary (2013). A Ship Without Sail: The Life of Lorenz Hart. New York: Simon & Schuster. ISBN 978-1-416-59426-0.
- Plantenga, Bart (2013). Yodel in Hi-Fi: From Kitsch Folk to Contemporary Electronica. Madison, Wisconsin: University of Wisconsin Press. ISBN 978-0-299-29054-2.
- Yanow, Scott (2003). Jazz on Record: The First Sixty Years. San Francisco, California: Backbeat Books. ISBN 978-0-879-30755-4.
