= Ten Cents a Dance (1931 film) =

1931 film

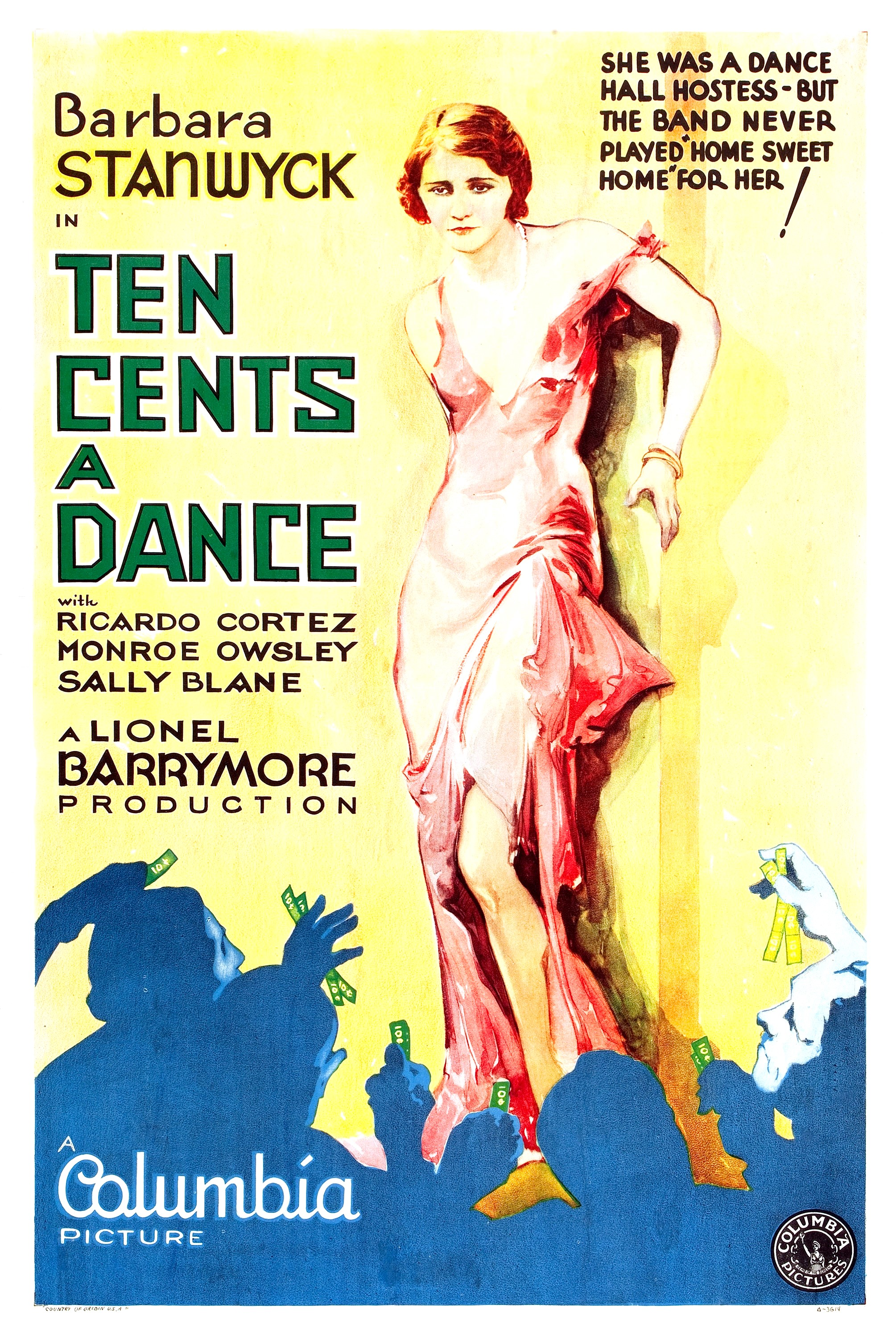
- Theatrical release poster
- Directed by: Lionel Barrymore
- Written by: Jo Swerling; Dorothy Howell (continuity)
- Produced by: Harry Cohn; Frank Fouce
- Starring: Barbara Stanwyck; Ricardo Cortez; Monroe Owsley; Sally Blane
- Cinematography: Ernest Haller; Gilbert Warrenton
- Edited by: Arthur Huffsmith
- Music by: Constantin Bakaleinikoff; Richard Rodgers; Lorenz Hart
- Production company: Columbia Pictures
- Distributed by: Columbia Pictures
- Release date: March 6, 1931 (US)
- Running time: 75 minutes
- Country: United States
- Language: English

Ten Cents a Dance is a 1931 American pre-Code romance-drama film directed by Lionel Barrymore and starring Barbara Stanwyck as a married taxi dancer who falls in love with one of her customers. The film was inspired by the popular song of the same name, which is sung over the title sequence. The film was also made in a Spanish language version, titled, Carne de Cabaret, directed by Christy Cabanne.

== Plot ==
A beautiful streetwise taxi dancer named Barbara O'Neill works at a New York City dance hall called Palais de Dance. One of the dance hall's wealthy patrons, Bradley Carlton, comes to the hall and gives Barbara $100. Concerned about her unemployed friend and neighbor Eddie Miller, Barbara asks Bradley to give him a job, and he agrees. That night they have dinner together.

When Barbara gets home, Eddie is in the process of packing his bags; he can no longer afford to pay his rent. Barbara gives him the $100 she received from Bradley and tells him about his new job. Later, Eddie and Barbara meet in the park and realize that they are in love. The next night at the dance hall, Barbara receives a gift of a new dress, but is disappointed when she sees that it was sent by Bradley. Eddie arrives at the dance hall and asks Barbara to marry him. Barbara accepts his proposal and soon quits her job.

Five months later, Eddie meets his old friend Ralph Clark and Ralph's sister Nancy, and does not reveal that he is now married. They play cards together and Eddie loses $240, something he hides from Barbara. He claims to be at a convention, but in fact he meets up with Nancy. Later, Eddie returns to find the rent and utilities past due because he has spent his pay gambling. Meanwhile, Barbara returns to work at the dance hall, where she sees Bradley occasionally.

Later, Barbara returns home and discovers Eddie packing his bags. Admitting that he stole $5,000 from Bradley's office safe, he tells her that he lost that money playing the stock market. Barbara is able to talk him into staying, and she visits Bradley and asks him for a $5,000 loan. Initially somewhat perturbed, knowing it's for somebody else, Bradley agrees because he is in love with her. She confides in him that the money is for returning the amount Eddie embezzled from the company safe. Bradley tells her that it won't be a loan, but a gift to her. The next morning, Barbara presents the money to Eddie, who accepts it immediately. When Eddie returns from work, he and Barbara engage in a jealous fight due to his finding out she got the money from Bradley. Eddie accuses Barbara of spending the night with Bradley to get the money but she denies it. Barbara packs her belongings and leaves Eddie, having had enough of him. Eddie then visits Bradley's home and confronts him for taking Barbara away from him. Eddie challenges him to bring Barbara to set the record straight, but Eddie tell him that 'he kicked her out.' Bradley admonishes Eddie that before he is kicked out of his home, not to drag Barbara into any scandal resulting from his petty jealousy and misdeeds, reminding him that he is still guilty of embezzlement, but he won't press charges. Utterly defeated, Eddie leaves. Now having left Eddie, Barbara returns to the dance hall, where she is met by Bradley who has two tickets for an ocean liner to France, where Barbara can obtain a divorce and marry him. Barbara agrees, and as they both admit they are glutton for punishment but like others, that they also need to eat.

== Cast ==
- Barbara Stanwyck as Barbara O'Neill
- Ricardo Cortez as Bradley Carlton
- Monroe Owsley as Eddie Miller
- Sally Blane as Molly
- Blanche Friderici as Mrs Blanchard
- Martha Sleeper as Nancy Clark
- David Newell as Ralph Sheridan
- Victor Potel as Smith
- Sidney Bracey as Wilson

=== Uncredited ===
- Abe Lyman and His Orchestra
- Aggie Herring as Mrs Carney
- Harry Todd as Mr Carney
- Phyllis Crane as Eunice
- Olive Tell as Mrs Carlton
- Al Hill as Jones
- Pat Harmon as Casey

== Production ==
The film was also shot in a Spanish language version, directed by Christy Cabanne. The Spanish version stars Lupita Tovar, Ramón Pereda, and René Cardona.
