= Ten Cents a Dance =

Song composed by Richard Rodgers performed by Ruth Etting

Song
- Published: 1930
- Genre: Tin Pan Alley, Vocal jazz
- Composer: Richard Rodgers
- Lyricist: Lorenz Hart

"Ten Cents a Dance" is a popular song with music by Richard Rodgers and lyrics by Lorenz Hart, written for the 1930 musical Simple Simon

== Background ==
The song lyrics tell of a taxi dancer lamenting the hardships of her job. The song was originally written for Lee Morse who was acting in the musical Simple Simon, but when Morse showed up intoxicated at the Boston opening of the musical, Florenz Ziegfeld fired her. She was replaced by Ruth Etting in the show, and Etting popularized the song as well in a Columbia recording made in 1930. This recording was inducted into the Grammy Hall of Fame in 1999. In 2012, it was added to the Library of Congress's National Recording Registry list of "culturally, historically, or aesthetically important" American sound recordings.

== Reprises ==
- Ella Fitzgerald recorded this song in 1956 on her Verve double-album Ella Fitzgerald Sings the Rodgers and Hart Songbook.
- Shirley Horn recorded the song in 1963, as part of her major-label debut with Mercury Records, Loads of Love.
- Cass Elliot on The Andy Williams Show, circa 1970.
- Joan Morris and William Bolcom recorded it for their 1981 LP, "The Rodgers and Hart Album," and later included the track on "The Rodgers and Hart CD."
- In 1985, the song was recorded by the British folk band Pyewackett on their LP 7 To Midnight.

== Popular culture ==
- Barbara Stanwyck starred in the film Ten Cents a Dance (1931), which was inspired by the song.
- In the MGM biographical film about Etting, Love Me or Leave Me (1955), the song is performed by Doris Day. The Day recording was also released by Columbia.
- Michelle Pfeiffer also performs the song in the film The Fabulous Baker Boys (1989).
- The Ruth Etting version of the song is part of the official soundtrack of the videogame BioShock 2 (2010).

== Parodies ==
- In the cartoon show Cow & Chicken episode "Supermodel Cow", Cow becomes a celebrity. After she loses popularity, she is found by her brother in a milk bar singing "10 Cents a Glass."
- In the cartoon DuckTales, the story of how Scrooge McDuck met personal pilot Launchpad McQuack involves them dickering over McQuack's rate of pay, with McQuack confusingly suggesting "ten cents a dance" instead of "ten cents a mile."
