= Golden Dream Girl =

Waltz song written in 1924 by Lee Morse

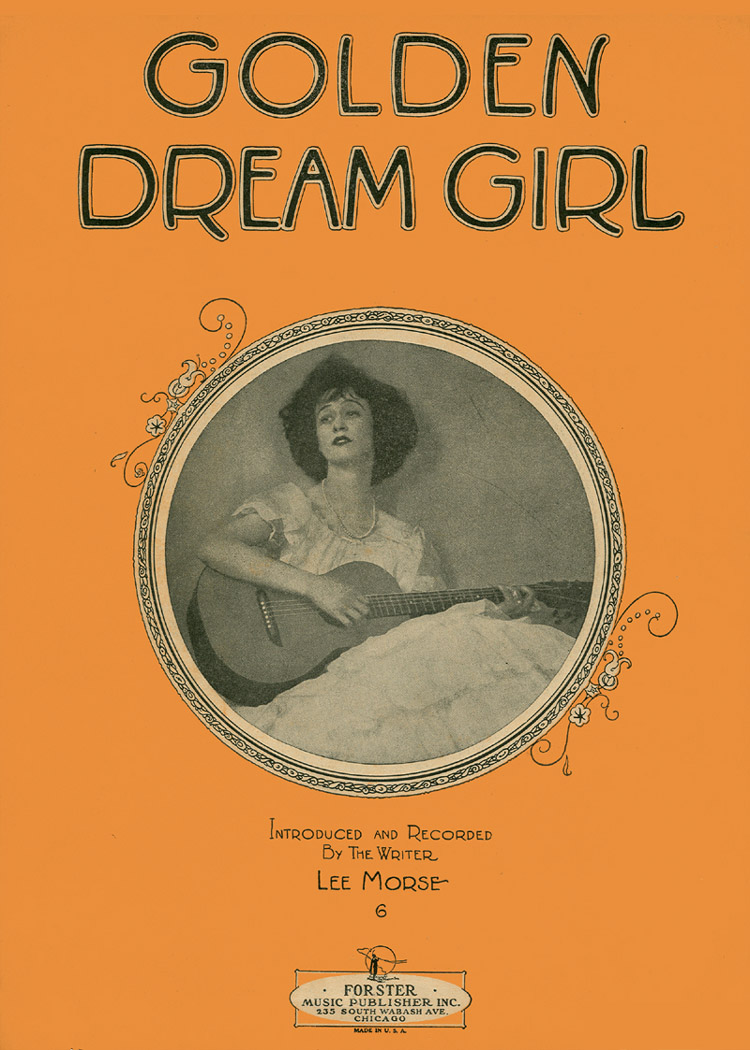

Song
- Published: 1924
- Genre: Waltz
- Length: 3:09
- Label: Perfect
- Songwriter(s): Lee Morse

"Golden Dream Girl" is a waltz song written in 1924 by Lee Morse. The song is about a person dreaming of a girl they saw on the beach in Hawaii. Lee Morse and Jack Stillman's Orchestra made the first recordings.

== Lyrics ==
There's a song that haunts me
there's a girl that wants me
I'll always love her
always think of her
But the fates win somehow and I must forget now
"farewell to thee"
that melody haunts me

Golden dream girl
you're my own South Sea pearl
Since that night on the sands your little brown hands
Set my world awhirl
Oh, my South Sea flower
that enchanted hour
Makes my heart ache to come back and take you home
For mine alone, golden dream girl

I can see her standing
At the old boat landing
Brown eyes so tearful
Poor heart so fearful
Hopelessly believing
That her sweethearts leaving
Forever more, that sweet hawai'ian shore

Golden dream girl
you're my own South Sea pearl
Since that night on the sands your little brown hands
Set my world awhirl
Oh, my South Sea flower
that enchanted hour
Makes my heart ache to come back and take you home
For mine alone, golden dream girl
