= Simple Simon (musical) =

- original 1930 sheet music
- Music: Richard Rodgers
- Lyrics: Lorenz Hart
- Book: Guy Bolton; Ed Wynn
- Productions: 1930 Broadway; 1931 Broadway revival

Simple Simon is a Broadway musical with book by Guy Bolton, and Ed Wynn, lyrics by Lorenz Hart, music by Richard Rodgers, produced by Florenz Ziegfeld Jr., and starring Ed Wynn.

It originally played from February 18, 1930, to June 14, 1930, at the Ziegfeld Theatre, then reopened on March 9, 1931, at the Majestic Theatre.

The play, a loose plot designed to show off Ed Wynn's fumbling, clowning, punning style, cast him as a newspaper vendor who spends his time in a fairy-tale land where bad news does not exist. The song "Ten Cents a Dance" was introduced by Ruth Etting in this show. "Love Me or Leave Me" by Gus Kahn and Walter Donaldson was interpolated into the show about two months after it opened. "I'm Yours", by Johnny Green and Yip Harburg, was added for the tour.

"Dancing on the Ceiling", cut during the Broadway previews, was eventually sung by Jessie Matthews in the London production of Ever Green, and became a standard.

The musical numbers written for the show included:

- "Coney Island"
- "Don't Tell Your Folks"
- "Magic Music"
- "I Still Believe in You"
- "Send for Me"
- "Dull and Gay"
- "Sweetenheart"
- "Hunting the Fox"
- "Come On, Men"
- "Ten Cents a Dance"
- "Rags and Tatters"
- "Dancing on the Ceiling" (dropped before the New York opening)
- "He Was Too Good to Me" (dropped before the New York opening)
- "Oh, So Lovely" (unused)
- "Peter Pan"
- "The Simple Simon Instep" (unused)
- "Prayers of Tears and Laughter" (dropped before the New York opening)
- "Hunting Song" (unused)
- "Come out of the Nursery" (dropped before the pre-Broadway tryout)
- "Sing Glory Hallelujah" (dropped before the pre-Broadway tryout)

The song "I Can Do Wonders with You", from a previous show, was interpolated.
